= List of awards and nominations received by Michael Haneke =

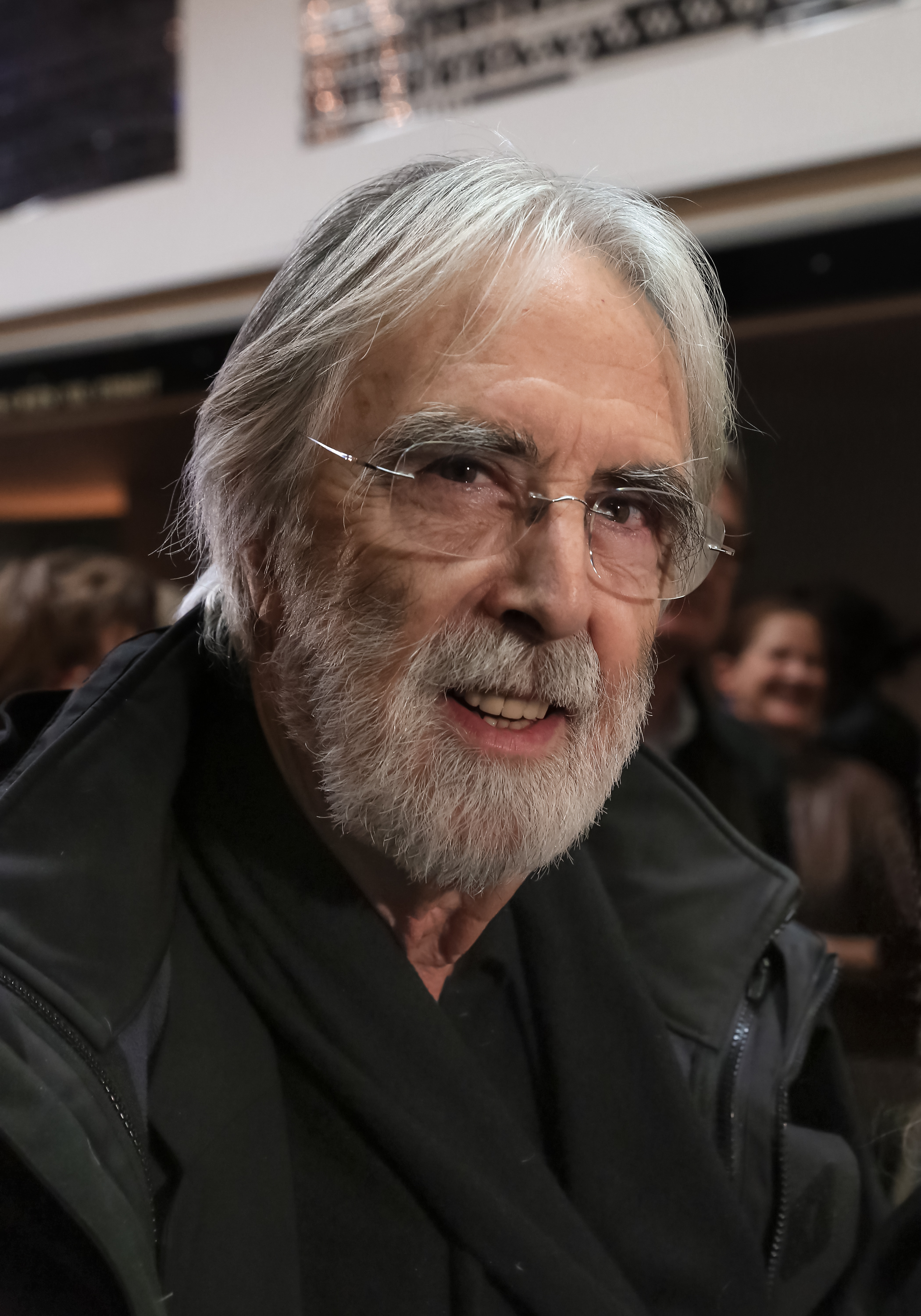
Michael Haneke in 2014

Michael Haneke is an Austrian director and writer.

He has received numerous accolades including a BAFTA Award, three César Awards, and an Independent Spirit Award. He has received two Academy Award nominations for Amour (2012), which won the Academy Award for Best Foreign Language Film for Austria; his previous film, The White Ribbon (2009), was submitted by Germany and ultimately received a nomination. He has also received numerous accolades from the Cannes Film Festival, including two Palme d'Ors.

== Major associations ==
=== Academy Awards ===
Year	Category	Nominated work	Result	Ref.
2012	Best Foreign Language Film	Amour	Accepted	
2012	Best Director	Amour	Nominated	
2012	Best Original Screenplay	Amour	Nominated	

=== BAFTA Awards ===
Year	Category	Nominated work	Result	Ref.
2012	Best Direction	Amour	Nominated	
2012	Best Original Screenplay	Amour	Nominated	
2012	Best Film Not in the English Language	Amour	Accepted	

=== César Awards ===
Year	Category	Nominated work	Result	Ref.
2006	Best Director	Caché	Nominated	
2006	Best Original Screenplay	Caché	Nominated	
2010	Best Foreign Film	The White Ribbon	Nominated	
2013	Best Film	Amour	Won	
2013	Best Director	Amour	Won	
2013	Best Original Screenplay	Amour	Won	

=== Independent Spirit Awards ===
Year	Category	Nominated work	Result	Ref.
2002	Best International Film	The Piano Teacher	Nominated	
2012	Best International Film	Amour	Won	

== Film Festival Awards ==
=== Cannes Film Festival ===
Year	Category	Nominated work	Result	Ref.
1997	Palme d'Or	Funny Games	Nominated	
2000	Palme d'Or	Code Unknown	Nominated	
2000	Prize of the Ecumenical Jury	Code Unknown	Won	
2001	Palme d'Or	The Piano Teacher	Nominated	
2001	Grand Prix	The Piano Teacher	Won	
2005	Palme d'Or	Caché	Nominated	
2005	Best Director	Caché	Won	
2005	Prize of the Ecumenical Jury	Caché	Won	
2005	FIPRESCI Prize	Caché	Won	
2009	Palme d'Or	The White Ribbon	Won	
2009	Prize of the Ecumenical Jury	The White Ribbon	Won	
2009	FIPRESCI Prize	The White Ribbon	Won	
2009	French National Education System Prize	The White Ribbon	Won	
2012	Palme d'Or	Amour	Won	
2017	Palme d'Or	Happy End	Nominated	

=== Chicago Film Festival ===
Year	Category	Nominated work	Result	Ref.
1992	Gold Hugo	Benny's Video	Nominated	
1994	Gold Hugo	Amok	Won	
1997	Gold Hugo	Funny Games	Nominated	
1997	Silver Hugo	Funny Games	Nominated	

=== Munich Film Festival ===
Year	Category	Nominated work	Result	Ref.
2009	CineMerit Award		Honored	
2017	Best International Film	Happy End	Nominated	

=== San Sebastian Film Festival ===
Year	Category	Nominated work	Result	Ref.
2009	FIPRESCI Film of the Year	The White Ribbon	Won	
2012	FIPRESCI Film of the Year	Amour	Won	
2017	Audience Award	Happy End	Nominated	

=== Palm Springs Film Festival ===
Year	Category	Nominated work	Result	Ref.
2002	FIPRESCI Prize	The Piano Teacher	Runner-Up	

=== Zurich Film Festival ===
Year	Category	Nominated work	Result	Ref.
2013	Tribute Award		Honored	

== Accolades for Haneke's feature films ==
Year	Film	Academy Awards		BAFTAs		Golden Globes		Césars	
Year	Film	Nominations	Wins	Nominations	Wins	Nominations	Wins	Nominations	Wins
2001	The Piano Teacher			1				2	1
2005	Caché							4	
2009	The White Ribbon	2		1		1	1	1	
2012	Amour	5	1	4	2	1	1	10	5
Total		7	1	6	2	2	2	17	6
