= Susanne Lothar =

German actress

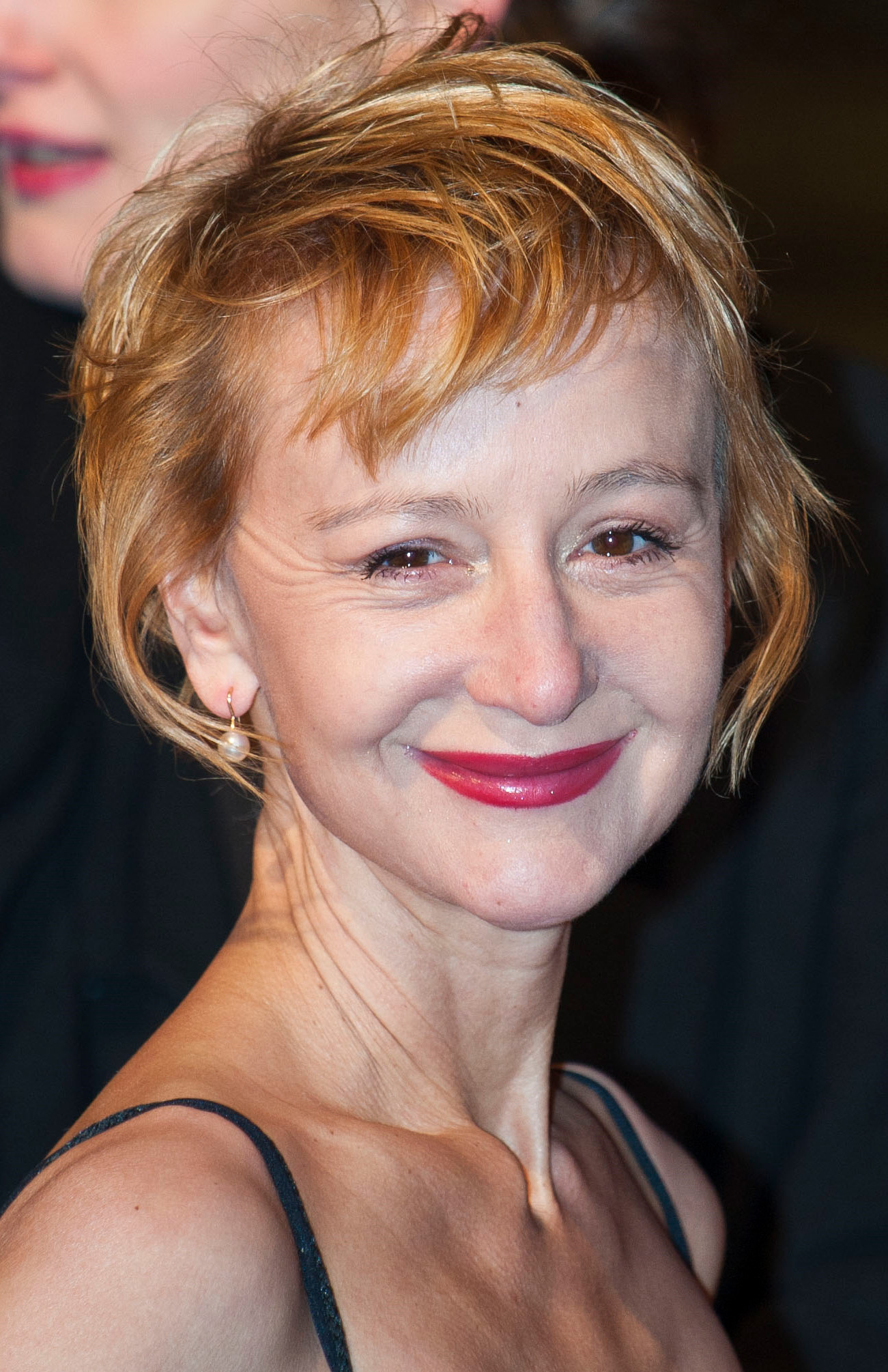
- Lothar in 2011
- Born: 15 November 1960; Hamburg, West Germany
- Died: 21 July 2012 (aged 51); Berlin, Germany
- Occupation: Actress
- Years active: 1983–2012
- Spouse: Ulrich Mühe (m. 1997; died 2007)
- Children: 2
- Parent(s): Hanns Lothar; Ingrid Andree

Susanne Lothar (15 November 1960 – 21 July 2012) was a German film, television and stage actress. Her work included collaborations with Austrian filmmaker Michael Haneke. She was married to fellow actor Ulrich Mühe, with whom she frequently appeared on stage and in films.

== Early life and education ==
Susanne Lothar was born on 15 November 1960 in Hamburg, Germany. The only daughter of actors Hanns Lothar and Ingrid Andree, her parents divorced when she was five, the year before her father's death. Lothar grew up with her mother in Eppendorf, studying drama at the Hochschule für Theater und Musik (School of Theatre and Music) in Hamburg.

== Theatre work ==
Lothar was a star of the Deutsches Schauspielhaus theatre company in Hamburg for many years, under the direction of Peter Zadek. In Zadek's 1989 production of Wedekind's "Lulu", Lothar raged across the Schauspielhaus stage with her breasts bare. In an interview, Lothar said "I never understood what he wanted from me, I didn't know what he saw in me, but I felt it. I now know that I was a muse for him at some point in his life." Of the role of the child-woman Lulu, which was tailor-made for her by Zadek, she said, "When I didn't know what to do, I took off my clothes or those of my partners."

Lothar's stage career took her to Cologne, Vienna, Zurich, Stuttgart, Salzburg and Berlin. In 1988, "Theater heute" voted her "Actress of the Year".

In 1999, Lothar and Muhe returned to Hamburg to star in Zadek's production of Sarah Kane's "Cleansed". The production involved the actors committing acts of violence against each other, causing audience members to flee the theatre, and solidified their reputation as "extremist" actors.

== Film work ==
Lothar made her film debut in Tankred Dorst's Eisenhans (Strange Fruits, 1983), which earned her the Federal Film Prize for best young actress.

She worked with Austrian director Michael Haneke in four films, typically playing women in states of extreme physical or emotional distress.

In Funny Games (1997) she and Mühe played a bourgeois married couple who are terrorised, tortured and eventually murdered by two young intruders in their palatial country house. Haneke originally offered the role to Isabelle Huppert who turned it down, explaining later "[t]here was very little space for fiction, it was more like a sacrifice for the actors than anything else." In a 2019 interview for the Criterion Collection release of Funny Games, Haneke explained that Lothar would make herself cry before shooting a scene. Haneke also required Lothar to film multiple takes of difficult scenes (including one where she is forced to pray for her family's life), until she reached the state of physical and mental exhaustion he wanted for the character. The film's controversial themes and success on the film festival circuit introduced Lothar to a wider international audience.

In the same year, Lother and Mühe appeared in Haneke's adaptation of Franz Kafka's 1926 novel The Castle. First shown on television in Austria, the film was released theatrically in Germany, the Czech Republic, Japan, Canada and the United States.

Lothar appeared in Haneke's psychological drama The Piano Teacher (2001) as the ambitious mother of a young pianist who is bullied by her jealous teacher (played by Isabelle Huppert). The film won multiple prizes at the 2001 Cannes Film Festival, with Lothar receiving critical praise for her work.

Lothar's final film with Haneke was the Palme d'Or-winning period drama The White Ribbon (2009), an examination of repression and violence in a German village just before the outbreak of World War I. Lothar's role as a midwife in an abusive relationship with the village doctor again showcased her affinity for playing anguished, masochistic women.

In 2006, Lothar and Mühe co-starred in Nicole Mosleh's debut feature Nemesis, another portrayal of an estranged married couple in crisis. Mühe was diagnosed with cancer while the film was in post-production and died before its completion. After Mühe's death, Lothar brought a legal claim against the filmmakers, preventing its release for three years. Nemesis eventually premiered at the Hof International Film Festival in 2010.

Lothar appeared in English-language roles in Stephen Daldry's The Reader (2008) and Joe Wright's Anna Karenina (2012). At the time of her death, she had been shooting the drama Inner Amok with Austrian director Peter Brunner.

== Personal life and death ==
Lothar married actor Ulrich Mühe in 1997. They had two children together, and Lothar became stepmother to Mühe's daughter from a previous marriage, the actress Anna Maria Mühe.

In February 2007, Mühe and Lothar attended the 79th Academy Awards ceremony in Los Angeles, where Mühe's film The Lives of Others won the Best Foreign Film award. Mühe, who was suffering from terminal cancer, died in July 2007.

Lothar died in Berlin on 21 July 2012, aged 51. Her death was announced by her family lawyer, who added he would not be providing further details on the cause of death "for understandable reasons". In a 2019 Criterion Collection interview (recorded May 2017), Haneke suggested that Lothar had taken her own life – "And only a few years later she too died…or committed suicide." Lothar died the day before the fifth anniversary of Mühe's death.

== Filmography ==
- Strange Fruits (1983)
- Das Geheimnis des gelben Geparden (1990, TV film)
- Winckelmann's Travels (1990)
- The Mountain (1991)
- The Democratic Terrorist (1992)
- Benito (The Rise and Fall of Benito Mussolini, 1993, TV miniseries)
- Geschäfte (1994, TV film)
- Little Angel (1996, TV film)
- Funny Games (1997)
- The Castle (1997, TV film)
- Vom Küssen und vom Fliegen (2000, TV film)
- The Piano Teacher (2001)
- Snowland (2005)
- Under the Ice (2005)
- Madonnas (2007)
- The Reader (2008)
- Krauts, Doubts & Rock 'n' Roll (2008)
- The White Ribbon (2009)
- Nemesis (2010)
- Murder on the Orient Express (2010, TV film)
- The Coming Days (2010)
- If Not Us, Who? (2011)
- Remembrance (2011)
- Dust on Our Hearts (2012)
- Anna Karenina (2012)
