= Ulrich Mühe =

German actor (1953–2007)

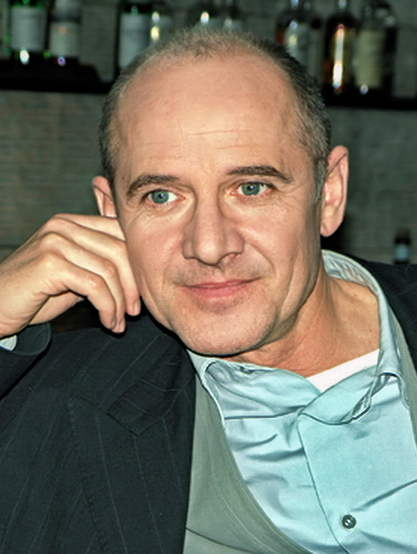
- Mühe in 2005
- Born: Friedrich Hans Ulrich Mühe; 20 June 1953; Grimma, East Germany
- Died: 22 July 2007 (aged 54); Walbeck, Saxony-Anhalt, Germany
- Occupations: Actor; theatre director
- Years active: 1979–2007
- Spouses: Annegret Hahn (m. 1976; div. 1983) Jenny Gröllmann (m. 1984; div. 1990) Susanne Lothar (m. 1997)
- Children: 5, including Anna Maria

Signature
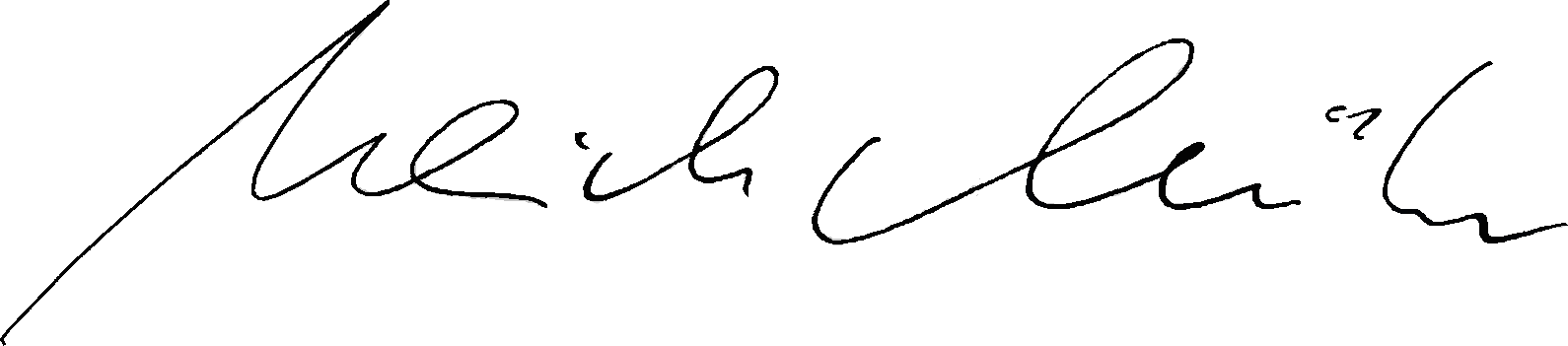

Friedrich Hans Ulrich Mühe (German pronunciation: [ˈʊlʁɪç ˈmyːə]; 20 June 1953 – 22 July 2007) was a German film, television and theatre actor. He played the role of Hauptmann (Captain) Gerd Wiesler in the Oscar-winning film Das Leben der Anderen (The Lives of Others, 2006), for which he received the gold award for Best Performance by an Actor in a Leading Role, at the Deutscher Filmpreis (German Film Awards); and the Best Actor Award at the 2006 European Film Awards.

After leaving school, Mühe was employed as a construction worker and a border guard at the Berlin Wall. He then turned to acting, and from the late 1970s into the 1980s appeared in numerous plays, becoming a star of the Deutsches Theater in East Berlin. He was active in politics and denounced Communist rule in East Germany in a memorable address at the Alexanderplatz demonstration on 4 November 1989 shortly before the fall of the Berlin Wall. After German reunification, he continued to appear in a large number of films, television programmes and theatre productions. In Germany he was particularly known for playing the lead role of Dr. Robert Kolmaar in the long-running forensic crime series Der letzte Zeuge (The Last Witness, 1998-2007).

== Early life and education ==
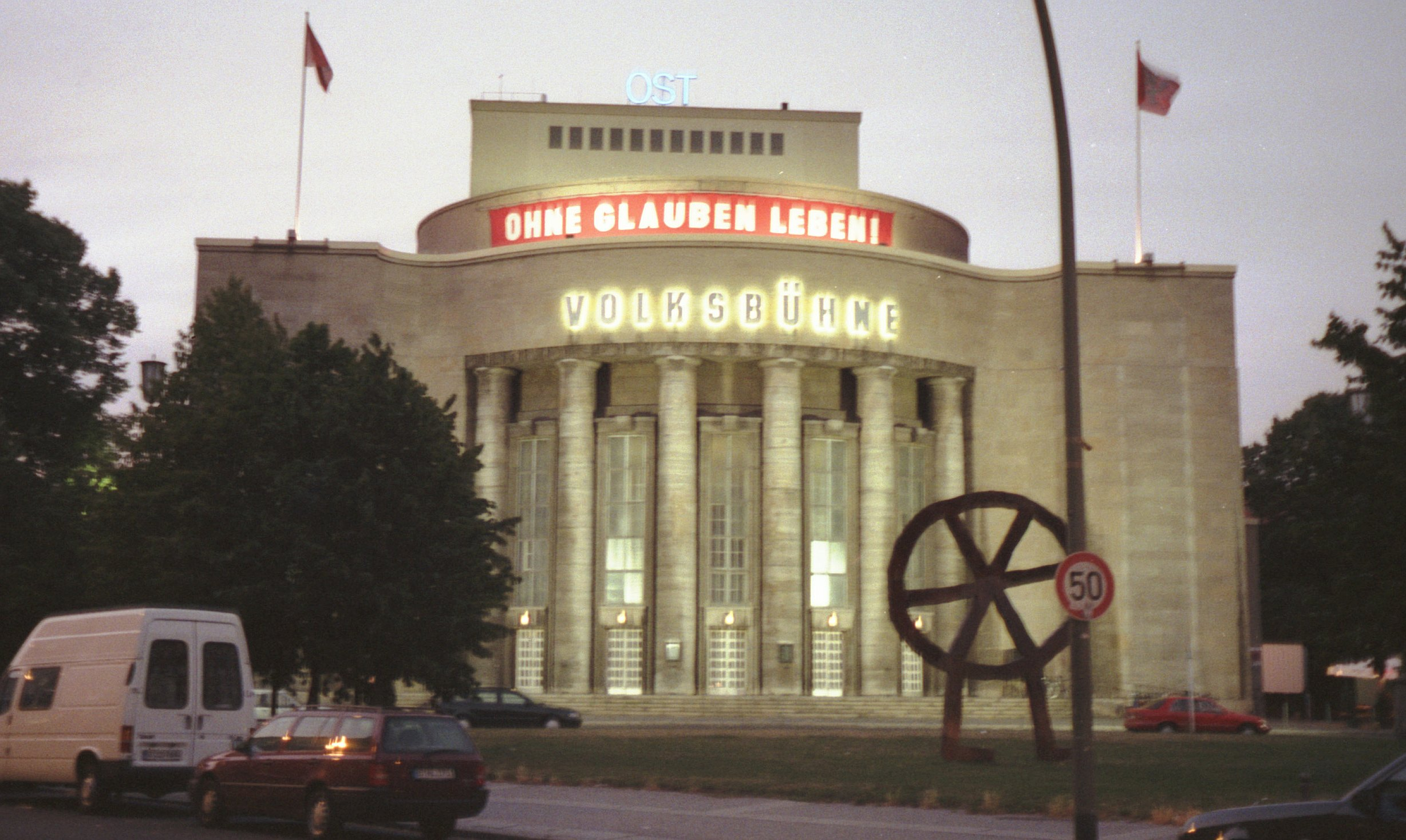
The Volksbühne in Rosa-Luxemburg-Platz in the borough of Mitte, Berlin, photographed in July 1999

The son of a furrier, Mühe was born on 20 June 1953 in Grimma, Bezirk Leipzig (part of present-day Saxony), in the German Democratic Republic (East Germany). After leaving school, he trained as a construction worker, then did compulsory military service in the Nationale Volksarmee (National People's Army) as a border guard at the Berlin Wall. He was relieved of duty after contracting stomach ulcers; possibly due to stress, according to observers, and also suggested that it marked the beginnings of the stomach cancer that would eventually lead to his death.

He then turned to acting, and studied at the Theaterhochschule "Hans Otto" Leipzig from 1975 to 1979. He appeared in his first professional stage role in 1979, as Lyngstrand in Ibsen's Fruen fra havet (The Lady from the Sea) at the Städtisches Theater in Karl-Marx-Stadt (now Chemnitz). He followed this by appearing in a production of Macbeth by playwright and director Heiner Müller at the Volksbühne in East Berlin.

== Career ==
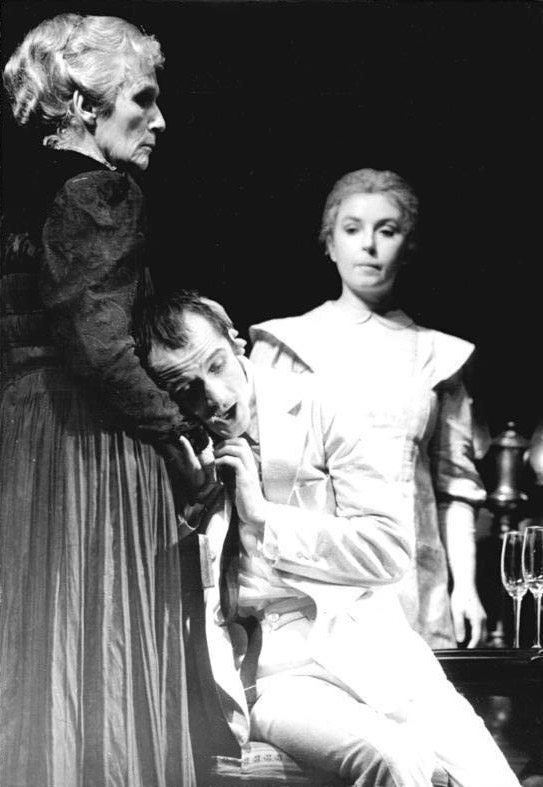
The premiere of Henrik Ibsen's Ghosts on 18 November 1983 in the Kammerspiele (Chamber Play Theatre) of the Deutsches Theater with, from left, Inge Keller as Mrs. Alving, Mühe as her son Osvald, and Simone von Zglinicki as the maid Regine Engstrand

In 1983, at Müller's invitation he joined the ensemble of East Berlin's Deutsches Theater, and became its star due to his versatility in comic and serious roles, appearing in productions such as Goethe's Egmont (1986), Ibsen's Peer Gynt and Lessing's Nathan der Weise (Nathan the Wise, 1988). He took the lead role of Hamlet in both Shakespeare's play and Heiner Müller's Die Hamletmaschine (Hamletmachine, 1989). Mühe later said: "Theatre was the only place in the GDR where people weren't lied to. For us actors it was an island. We could dare to criticise." On screen, he co-starred with his second wife Jenny Gröllmann in Herman Zschoche's film Hälfte des Lebens (Half of Life, 1984) about the German lyric poet Friedrich Hölderlin (1770–1843).

Mühe played a leading role in organizing the demonstrations that took place prior to the reunification of Germany. He often gave public readings from Walter Janka's essay Schwierigkeiten mit der Wahrheit (Difficulties with the Truth, 1989) at the Deutsches Theater, before the book was permitted to be published in East Germany. On 4 November 1989, shortly before the fall of the Berlin Wall, in front of half a million people during the Alexanderplatz demonstration, he declared the Communists' monopoly on power to be invalid. In the same year, he became internationally known after playing, next to Armin Mueller-Stahl and Klaus Maria Brandauer, the leading role in Bernhard Wicki's Das Spinnennetz (Spider's Web, based on the expressionist, fragmentary novel of the same name by Austrian writer Joseph Roth) the right-wing lieutenant Lohse who sleeps and murders his way to professional success in the early Weimar Republic following a near fatal injury during the Wilhelmshaven mutiny of 29 October 1918.

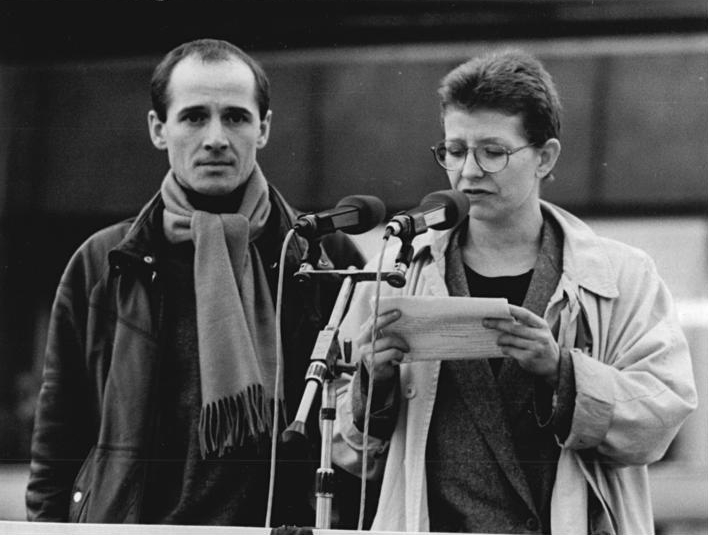
Mühe and fellow actor Johanna Schall speaking at the Alexanderplatz on 4 November 1989, following a demonstration by half a million citizens

After German reunification, he continued to appear in a large number of films, television programmes and theatre productions in Germany and abroad. He proved his ability to take on comic roles in Schtonk! (1991), an Oscar-nominated satire about the Hitler Diaries hoax, and showed his more serious side in Michael Haneke's Benny's Video (1992), Das Schloss (The Castle, 1997) (an adaptation of Kafka's The Castle (1922)) and Funny Games (1997). In the latter film, Mühe and his third wife Susanne Lothar played a husband and wife held captive in their holiday cabin by two psychotic young men who force them to play sadistic "games" with one another.

In the 2000s, Mühe played Nazis in a sequence of films. He portrayed Joseph Goebbels in Goebbels und Geduldig (Goebbels and Geduldig, 2001); Dr. Josef Mengele in Amen. (2002), a film by Costa Gavras; and was to have played Klaus Barbie in an upcoming feature. His last film was the comedy Mein Führer - Die wirklich wahrste Wahrheit über Adolf Hitler (My Führer: The Truly Truest Truth about Adolf Hitler, 2007), in which he played Prof. Adolf Israel Grünbaum, an actor hired to give Hitler lessons.

In 2006, he appeared at the Barbican Arts Centre in London in Zerbombt, Thomas Ostermeier's German production of Sarah Kane's Blasted, playing a middle-aged journalist whose encounter with a young girl leads to pandemonium in a Leeds hotel room.

Mühe was known in Germany for playing the brilliant but eccentric pathologist Dr. Robert Kolmaar in 73 episodes of the forensic crime serial Der letzte Zeuge (The Last Witness, 1998–2007), for which he was awarded the prize for Beste/r Schauspieler/in in einer Serie (Best Actor or Actress in a TV Series) at the Deutscher Fernsehpreis (German Television Awards) in 2005.

== The Lives of Others, and later life ==
Mühe as Hauptmann Gerd Wiesler in Das Leben der Anderen (The Lives of Others, 2006). Curiously, events in Mühe's own life were mirrored by the storyline of the film.

To English-speaking audiences, Mühe was probably best known for portraying Hauptmann (Captain) Gerd Wiesler in Florian Henckel von Donnersmarck's Das Leben der Anderen (The Lives of Others, 2006), which won the Academy Award for Best Foreign Language Film in 2007. The film is set in the mid-1980s, and Wiesler is a Stasi agent who is assigned to bug and conduct surveillance of the apartment of an East German playwright, Georg Dreyman (Sebastian Koch), and his girlfriend, the actress Christa-Maria Sieland (Martina Gedeck). However, he becomes disillusioned about the necessity of monitoring the couple for national security reasons after discovering that the government minister who ordered the surveillance did so for sexual rather than political motives. Gradually, Wiesler's heart moves from contempt and envy to compassion. For his performance, in 2006 Mühe received, among other things, the Beste darstellerische Leistung - Männliche Hauptrolle (Best Performance by an Actor in a Leading Role), Gold, at Germany's most prestigious film awards, the Deutscher Filmpreis (German Film Awards); and the Best Actor Award at the European Film Awards.

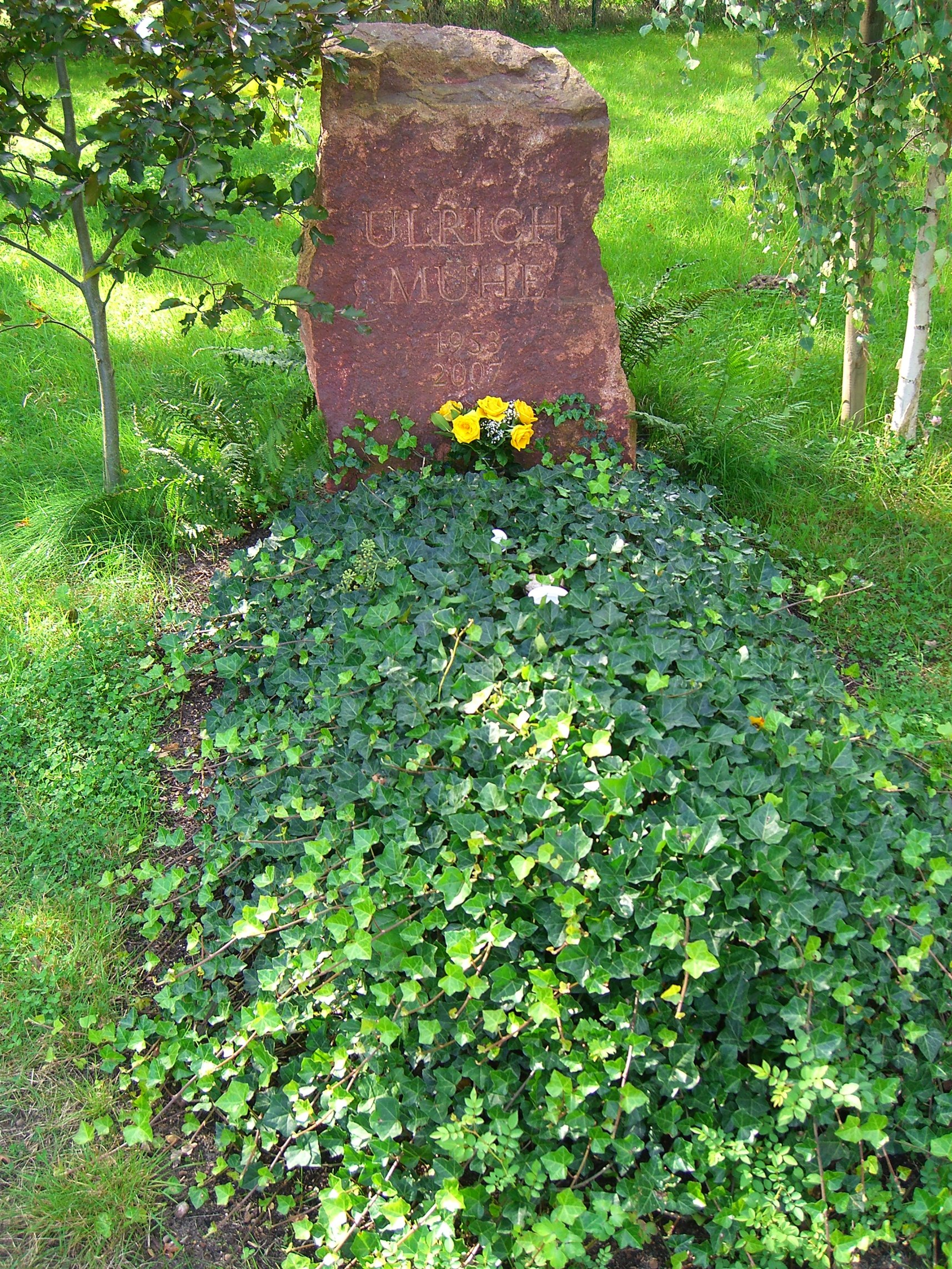
Mühe's grave in Walbeck, photographed in 2011

The Bundesstiftung zur Aufarbeitung der SED-Diktatur (Federal Foundation for the Reappraisal of the SED Dictatorship, known in short as "Stiftung Aufarbeitung"), the government-funded organization tasked with examining and reappraising East-Germany's pseudo-Communist dictatorship, said of Mühe: "Through his impressive performance... Ulrich Mühe sensitized an audience of millions to the Stasi's machinations and their consequences." The statement added that Mühe had been an active and valued participant in the foundation's events.

Mühe was already seriously ill at the award ceremony in Los Angeles in February 2007 when Das Leben der Anderen was awarded its Oscar, and flew back to Germany hours later for an urgent stomach operation. In an article in Die Welt dated 21 July 2007, Mühe discussed his diagnosis of stomach cancer which had put his acting career on hold; he died the following day. On 25 July 2007, he was buried in his mother's village of Walbeck in the Landkreis (rural district) of Börde, Saxony-Anhalt.

== Personal life ==
Mühe was married three times. He was first married to dramaturge Annegret Hahn; the couple had two sons: Andreas, a Berlin-based photographer, and Konrad, a painter. His second marriage was in 1984 to the actress Jenny Gröllmann, after they fell in love while acting together in the TV film Die Poggenpuhls (The Poggenpuhls) in that year. Mühe and Gröllmann had a daughter, Anna Maria Mühe, who is also an actress; and he was stepfather to Gröllmann's daughter Jeanne, a make-up artist.

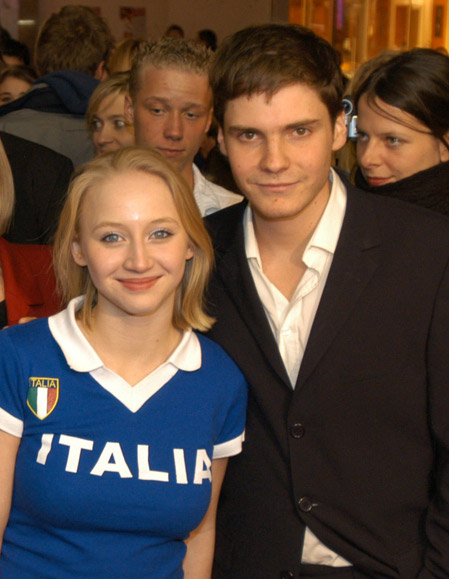
Mühe's daughter Anna Maria, with actor Daniel Brühl at the première of their film Was nützt die Liebe in Gedanken (Love in Thoughts, 2004)

After German reunification, Mühe allegedly discovered evidence in his Stasi file that he had been under surveillance not only by four of his fellow actors in the East Berlin theatre, but also by his wife Gröllmann. The file held detailed records of meetings that Gröllmann, who was registered as an "Inoffizieller Mitarbeiter" (unofficial collaborator), had with her controller from 1979 to 1989. This mirrored the plot of Das Leben der Anderen as in the film pressure exerted by the Stasi on the playwright's girlfriend makes her betray him as the author of an exposé of covered-up GDR suicide rates. Mühe and Gröllmann divorced in 1990. In a book accompanying the film, Mühe spoke about the sense of betrayal he felt when he found out about his former wife's alleged Stasi role. However, Gröllmann's real-life controller later claimed he had made up many of the details in the file and that the actress had been unaware that she was speaking to a Stasi agent. After a highly public and acrimonious battle in the courts, Gröllmann, who died in August 2006, won an injunction preventing the book's publication. Mühe's response when asked how he prepared for his role in Das Leben der Anderen was, "I remembered".

At the time of his death, Mühe was married to his third wife, actress Susanne Lothar, and living in Berlin with her and their two children, Sophie Marie and Jakob. Mühe and Lothar starred together in Mühe's last film, Nemesis (2010), which deals with a couple's troubled relationship. However, Lothar, who died in 2012, launched a lawsuit to block the film from release for nearly three years, apparently because she felt that it would cast the couple in a bad light.

== Awards ==
In addition to the awards mentioned elsewhere in this article, Mühe was conferred the following awards:

- 1990 - The Chaplin Shoe, the Deutscher Darstellerpreis (German Actor Award) of the Bundesverbandes der Fernseh- und Filmregisseure in Deutschland eV (Federal Association of Television and Film Directors in Germany).
- 1991 - The Gertrud-Eysoldt-Ring (Gertrud Eysoldt Ring)
- 1992 - The Bambi
- 1994 - The Kainz-Medaille (Kainz Medal)
- 2006 - The Bernhard-Wicki-Filmpreis (Bernhard Wicki Film Award)
- The Helene-Weigel-Medaille (Helene Weigel Medal)
- The prize of the critics of the Berliner Zeitung

== Filmography ==
=== Film ===
Year	Title	Role	Director	Notes
1983	Olle Henry	Junger Mann	Ulrich Weiß	
1985	The Woman and the Stranger	Revolutionär	Rainer Simon	
1985	Hälfte des Lebens	Friedrich Hölderlin	Herrmann Zschoche	
1989	Das Spinnennetz	Theodor Lohse	Bernhard Wicki	
1989	Hard Days, Hard Nights	Flimmer	Horst Königstein	
1990	Sehnsucht	Sieghart	Jürgen Brauer	
1992	Schtonk!	Dr. Wieland	Helmut Dietl	
1992	Benny's Video	Vater	Michael Haneke	
1994	The Blue One	Karl Kaminski	Lienhard Wawrzyn	
1995	Rudy, the Racing Pig	Dr. Heinrich Gützkow	Peter Timm	
1996	Peanuts – The Bank Pays Everything	Dr. Jochen Schuster	Carlo Rola	
1996	Engelchen	Kommissar	Helke Misselwitz	
1997	Funny Games	Georg	Michael Haneke	
1997	Die Healthy	Hugo Wallner	Gert Steinheimer	
1997	The Castle	K.	Michael Haneke	TV film
1998	Night Time	Eschbach	Peter Fratzscher	
1998	Rider of the Flames	Jacob Gontard	Nina Grosse	
1999	Straight Shooter	Markus Paufler	Thomas Bohn	
2001	Goebbels und Geduldig	Harry Geduldig / Joseph Goebbels	Kai Wessel	
2002	Amen.	Doctor	Costa-Gavras	
2003	Spy Sorge	Eugen Ott	Masahiro Shinoda	
2003	Hamlet_X	Claudius Müller	Herbert Fritsch	
2005	Schneeland	Knövel	Hans W. Geißendörfer	
2006	The Lives of Others	Hpt. Gerd Wiesler	Florian Henckel von Donnersmarck	
2007	My Führer – The Really Truest Truth about Adolf Hitler	Adolf Grünbaum	Dani Levy	
2010	Nemesis	Robert	Nicole Mosleh	Posthumous release, (final film role)

=== Television ===
Year(s) of appearance	Film or series	Role	Awards and nominations
1983	Der Mann und sein Name (The Man and His Name)		
1984	Die Poggenpuhls (The Poggenpuhls)	Leo	
1986	Das Buschgespenst (The Bush Ghost)	Kaufmann Strauch	
1987	Die erste Reihe (The First Row)	Rudolf Schwarz	
1988	Nadine, meine Liebe (Nadine, My Love)	Oberleutnant (Senior Lieutenant) Stein	
1988 (1 episode)	Polizeiruf 110 (Emergency Call 110) (1971–present) "Flüssige Waffe" ("Liquid Weapon")	Kegel	
1989	Die gläserne Fackel (The Glass Torch)	Maxi Steinhüter	
1990	Der kleine Herr Friedemann (Little Herr Friedemann)	Johannes Friedemann	
1991	Ende der Unschuld (The End of Innocence)	Julian Green	
1991	Jugend ohne Gott (The Age of the Fish)	Lehrer (teacher)	
1993 (1 episode)	Extralarge: Diamonds	Father Enrique	
1993	Das letzte U-Boot (The Last U-Boat)	Lt. Cmdr. Gerber	
1993	Wehner – die unerzählte Geschichte (Wehner - The Untold Story)	Selbstmörder (suicide victim)	
1994	Geschäfte (Business)	Sturm	
1995	… nächste Woche ist Frieden (...Next Week brings Peace)		
1995	Nadja - Heimkehr in die Fremde (Nadja - Homecoming Among Foreigners)	Sergej	
1995	Nikolaikirche (St. Nicholas Church)	Pfarrer (Minister) Ohlbaum	
1995 (1 episode)	Rosa Roth (1994-2006) "Lügen" ("Lies")		
1995	Tödliches Schweigen (Deadly Silence)	Christian Plache	
1996	Das tödliche Auge (The Deadly Eye)	Stefan	
1996 (1 episode)	Tatort (Crime Scene) (1970–present) "Die Abrechnung" ("The Reckoning")	Peter Fuchs	
1998	36 Stunden Angst (36 Hours)	Rudolph	
1998 (1 episode)	Siska (1998–present) "Tod einer Würfelspielerin" ("Death of a Female Dice-Thrower")		
1998-2007 (73 episodes)	Der letzte Zeuge (The Last Witness)	Dr. Robert Kolmaar	Golden Lion for Best Actor in a TV Series, RTL Golden Lion Awards (1998) (nominated); Bester Schauspieler in einer Hauptrolle - Serie (Best Actor in a Leading Role - TV Series), Deutscher Fernsehpreis (German Television Awards) (1999) (nominated); Bester Schauspieler in einer Hauptrolle - Serie (Best Actor in a Leading Role - TV Series), Deutscher Fernsehpreis (German Television Awards) (2003) (nominated); Bavarian TV Award (with writer Gregor Edelmann) (2005); Beste/r Schauspieler/in in einer Serie (Best Actor or Actress in a TV Series), Deutscher Fernsehpreis (German Television Awards) (2005)
1999 (1 episode)	Tatort (Crime Scene) (1970–present) "Traumhaus" ("Dream House")	Friedel Hebbel	
1999	Todesengel (Angel of Death)	Dr. Leon Stein	
2001	Dreimal Leben (Life Times Three)	Henri	
2003	Alles Samba (Everything's Samba)	Gerd	
2003	Hamlet_X	Claudius Müller	
2003	Im Schatten der Macht (In the Shadow of Power)	Günter Gaus	
2004	Hunger auf Leben (Hunger for Life)	Jochen Hensel	
2006	Das Geheimnis von St. Ambrose (The Secret of St. Ambrose)	Professor Nicolas Cramer	
2006	Peer Gynt	Der Knopfgiesser (The Button Moulder)	

Some information in this table was obtained from Ulrich Mühe at IMDb. Retrieved on 23 September 2007.

=== Theater ===
Year(s) of appearance	Production	Role	Awards and nominations
1979	Fruen fra havet (The Lady from the Sea) by Henrik Ibsen Städtisches Theater, Karl-Marx-Stadt (now Chemnitz)	Lyngstrand	
[Date uncertain] (?1979-1986)	Macbeth by William Shakespeare Volksbühne, East Berlin		
18 November 1983	Gespenster (Ghosts) by Henrik Ibsen Kammerspiele (Chamber Play Theatre), Deutsches Theater, East Berlin	Osvald Alving	
1986	Egmont by Johann Wolfgang von Goethe Deutsches Theater, East Berlin	Egmont	
[Date uncertain] ?1986-1989	Hamlet by William Shakespeare Deutsches Theater, East Berlin	Hamlet	
[Date uncertain] ?1986-1989	Nathan der Weise (Nathan the Wise) by Gotthold Ephraim Lessing Deutsches Theater, East Berlin		
[Date uncertain] ?1986-1989	Peer Gynt by Henrik Ibsen Deutsches Theater, East Berlin	Peer Gynt	
1989	Die Hamletmaschine (Hamletmachine) by Heiner Müller Deutsches Theater, East Berlin	Hamlet	
1990	Die Jüdin von Toledo (The Jewess of Toledo) by Franz Grillparzer Salzburg Festival, Salzburg, Austria	König Alfons (King Alfonso, Alfonso VIII)	
end-1990s	Dreimal Leben (Life Times Three) by Yasmina Reza Burgtheater, Vienna, Austria	Henri	
1999	Gesäubert (Cleansed) by Sarah Kane Hamburg	Der Arzt (The Doctor)	
2003	Wittgenstein Incorporated Vienna Festwochen (Vienna Festival)		
2005	Zerbombt (Blasted) by Sarah Kane Berlin	Ian	
2006	Zerbombt (Blasted) by Sarah Kane Barbican Arts Centre, London	Ian	
[Date unknown]	Clavigo by Johann Wolfgang von Goethe	Clavigo	
[Date unknown]	Philotas by Gotthold Ephraim Lessing	Philotas	
[Date unknown]	Der Traum, ein Leben (The Dream, a Life) by Franz Grillparzer	Sigismundis	

=== Audio books ===
Year(s) of appearance	Book	Awards and nominations
1997	Ein Monat in Dachau (One Month in Dachau, 1992) by Vladimir Sorokin; translated from the Russian by Peter Urban	
1999	Ich bin eine Welt: Briefe und Gedichte - eine Collage (I am a World: Letters and Poems - a Collage) by Georg Trakl	
2000	Einen Dichter denken - LAUT (A Poet Thinks - ALOUD) by Heiner Müller	
2002	Adler und Engel (Eagles and Angels) by Juli Zeh	
2002	Die Kinder (The Children) by Peter Hacks	
2002	Reise gegen den Wind (Journey Against the Wind, 2000) by Peter Härtling	
2003	Südkurier (Southern Mail, 1929) by Antoine de Saint-Exupéry	
2003	Wind, Sand und Sterne (Wind, Sand and Stars, 1939) by Antoine de Saint-Exupéry	
2004	Ein unbekannter Freund (A Friend of Unknown Quantity) by Ivan Bunin (read by Susanne Lothar and Ulrich Mühe)	
2004	"Ich küsse Dich vielmals...": Liebesbriefe ("I Kiss You Many Times...": Love Letters) (read by Susanne Lothar and Ulrich Mühe)	
2005	Der kleine Prinz (The Little Prince, 1943) by Antoine de Saint-Exupéry	
2005	Weihnachtswünsche: Die Weihnachtsgeschichte nach Lukas und die schönsten Weihnachtsgedichte (Christmas Wishes: The History of Christmas according to Luke and the Most Beautiful Christmas Poems) by Joseph von Eichendorff (told by Otto Mellies, Ulrich Mühe and Otto Sander)	
2006	Shakespeares Hamlet und alles, was ihn für uns zum kulturellen Gedächtnis macht (Shakespeare's Hamlet and Everything that Makes it Cultural Memory For Us) (read by Dietrich Schwanitz, Ulrich Mühe and Hanns Zischler)	
2006	Von allem Anfang an (From All Beginning) by Christoph Hein	
[Date unknown]	Helden wie wir (Heroes Like Us, 1995) by Thomas Brussig	
[Date unknown]	Das kalte Herz (The Cold Heart, 1826) by Wilhelm Hauff	
[Date unknown]	Der Katze, die immer nur ihre eigenen Wege ging (The Cats, which in Each Case Went Their Own Ways, ?1985) by Horst Hawemann	
[Date unknown]	Die Weise von Liebe und Tod des Cornets Christoph Rilke (The Lay of the Love and Death of Cornet Christoph Rilke, 1906) by Rainer Maria Rilke	
