= Arno Frisch =

Austrian actor (born 1975)

- Born: 13 November 1975 (age 50); Vienna, Austria
- Occupation: Actor
- Years active: 1992-Present

Arno Frisch (born 13 November 1975) is an Austrian actor. He has had central roles in two films by Michael Haneke, namely, Benny's Video and Funny Games.

== Selected filmography ==
- Benny's Video (1992) as Benny
- Funny Games (1997) as Paul
- Angel Express (1998) as Doctor
- Julies Geist (Julie's Spirit) (2001) as Mark
- Blackout Journey (2004) as Valentin
- Your Name Is Justine (2005) as Niko
- The Austrian Method (2006) as Sascha
- Falco - Verdammt, wir leben noch! (2008) as Alois Hölzel
- Make Yourself at Home (2008) as John Waits
- Sleeping Songs (2009) as Rick
- Bedways (2010) as Max Konig
- Blessed Events (2010) as Herbert
- Prélude as Prof. Thibault
