= Gesine Cukrowski =

German actress (born 1968)

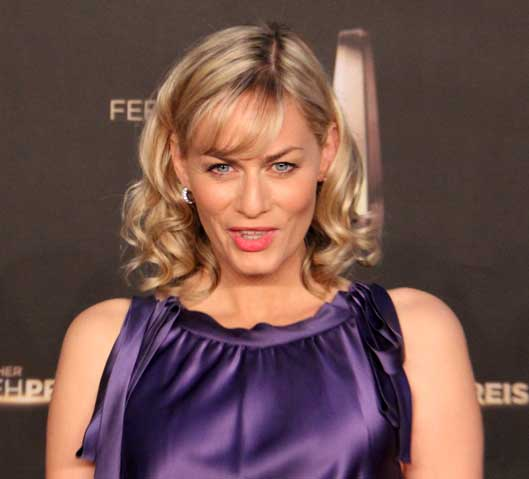
- Gesine Cukrowski in 2012
- Born: 23 October 1968 (age 56); West Berlin, West Germany
- Occupation: Actress
- Partner: Michael Helfrich
- Children: 1

Gesine Cukrowski (born 23 October 1968) is a German actress.

== Filmography ==
- 1989: Praxis Bülowbogen (4 episodes)
- 1991: Aufstand der Dinge
- 1994: Und tschüss! (13 episodes)
- 1994: Praxis Bülowbogen (11 episodes)
- 1995: Rosa Roth: Verlorenes Leben
- 1995: Und tschüss auf Mallorca
- 1996: Schwurgericht: Ein Kind war Zeuge
- 1996: Und tschüss in Amerika
- 1996: Mein Papa ist kein Mörder
- 1996: Blutige Rache
- 1996: 60 Minuten Todesangst
- 1998: The Sleeper
- 1998: Tatort: Engelchen flieg
- 1998: SOKO 5113: Der Überläufer
- 1998-2007: Der letzte Zeuge (71 episodes)
- 1999: T.E.A.M. Berlin: Der Verrat
- 2000: Kilimanjaro: How to Spell Love
- 2000: Der Bulle von Tölz: Tödliches Dreieck
- 2000: Die Kommissarin: Abschiedskonzert
- 2001: Bel Ami - Liebling der Frauen
- 2002: Donna Leon - Venezianisches Finale
- 2002: Edel & Starck: Seitensprung am Weidezaun
- 2002: FearDotCom
- 2003: Wunschkinder und andere Zufälle
- 2003: Donna Leon: Acqua Alta
- 2003: Balko: Der Racheengel
- 2003: Ein Fall für zwei: Nebengeschäfte
- 2003: Der Bestseller: Wiener Blut
- 2004: Lieben und Töten
- 2004: Der Bestseller
- 2004: Judith Kemp
- 2004: Wolffs Revier: Spätfolge
- 2005: Das Duo: Man lebt nur zweimal
- 2005: Krieg der Frauen
- 2005: Die Spielerin
- 2005: Die Hochzeit meiner Töchter
- 2006: At the End of the Silence
- 2006: Rettet die Weihnachtsgans
- 2006: Das Duo: Man lebt nur zweimal
- 2006: Eine Robbe zum Verlieben
- 2007: Eine Robbe und das große Glück
- 2007: Alarm für Cobra 11 - Die Autobahnpolizei: Entführt
- 2007: The Miracle of Berlin
- 2007: Das letzte Aufgebot
- 2007: Annas Albtraum kurz nach 6
- 2007: Der Kriminalist: Dunkles Geheimnis
- 2008: Final Proclamation
- 2008: Tatort: Blinder Glaube
- 2008: Ein Fall für zwei: Geplatzte Träume
- 2009: Zwischen heute und morgen
- 2009: Licht über dem Wasser
- 2009: Factor 8
- 2009: Die Bremer Stadtmusikanten
- 2009: Unter anderen Umständen: Auf Liebe und Tod
- 2010: Nemesis
- 2010: Das Duo: Mordbier
- 2010: Morgen musst Du sterben
- 2010: Tulpen aus Amsterdam
- 2010: Racheengel – Ein eiskalter Plan
- 2011: Leipzig Homicide: Letzter Abend DDR
- 2011: Marie Brand und die letzte Fahrt
- 2011: Flemming: Sexsüchtig
- 2011: Der Staatsanwalt: Tödlicher Pakt
- 2011: Ein starkes Team: Am Abgrund
- 2011: Familie für Fortgeschrittene
- 2011: Weihnachten ... ohne mich, mein Schatz!
- 2012: Emilie Richards: Spuren der Vergangenheit
- 2012: When It's Hot, at Least It's Not Cold
- 2012: Notruf Hafenkante: Der Prozess
- 2013: Fliegen lernen
- 2013: Ein Sommer in Portugal
- 2013: Cologne P.D.: Der stille Mord
- 2013: Herzensbrecher – Vater von vier Söhnen
- 2013: Grenzgang
- 2013: SOKO 5113: Es bleibt in der Familie
- 2014: Public Enemies
- 2014: Katie Fforde: Geschenkte Jahre
- 2014: Gegen den Sturm!
- 2014: Das Traumschiff: Mauritius
- 2015: Der Bergdoktor (3 episodes)
- since 2015: Letzte Spur Berlin
- 2015: Ein starkes Team: Tödliches Vermächtnis
- 2016: Heiter bis tödlich: Akte Ex - Die Lüge
- 2016: Inga Lindström: Familienbande
- 2016: Wilsberg: Mord und Beton
- 2017: The Old Fox: Therapie für Tote
- 2017: Alarm für Cobra 11 - Die Autobahnpolizei: Die verlorenen Kinder
- 2018: Katie Fforde: Mama allein zu Haus
- 2018: Doppelzimmer für drei
- 2018: Der Richter
