= Groma =

Groma may refer to:

- Groma language, spoken in Southeast Asia
- Groma (surveying), the principal Roman surveying instrument
- Groma Büromaschinen, an East German manufacturer of typewriters

== See also ==
- Krama, a sturdy traditional Cambodian garment with many uses, including as a scarf
