= Und tschüss! =

- Starring: Benno Fürmann; Gesine Cukrowski
- Country of origin: Germany

Und tschüss! is a German television series.

== See also ==
- List of German television series
