= Peas at 5:30 =

2004 German comedy film

- Directed by: Lars Büchel
- Starring: Hilmir Snær Guðnason; Fritzi Haberlandt
- Cinematography: Judith Kaufmann
- Release date: 4 March 2004
- Running time: 111 minutes
- Country: Germany
- Language: German

Peas at 5:30 (German: Erbsen auf halb 6), is a 2004 German comedy film directed by Lars Büchel.

== Plot ==
Jakob loses his eyesight in a traffic accident. He became desperate and had no inclination to live anymore When he meets Lilly, a blind teacher, a long journey begins.

== Cast ==
- Hilmir Snær Guðnason - Jakob
- Fritzi Haberlandt - Lilly
- Harald Schrott - Paul
- Tina Engel - Regine
- Jenny Gröllmann - Franziska
- Alice Dwyer - Alex
- Max Mauff - Ben
- Annett Renneberg - Nina
