= The Lives of Others =

2006 German film by Florian Henckel von Donnersmarck

- Original German-language poster
- Directed by: Florian Henckel von Donnersmarck
- Written by: Florian Henckel von Donnersmarck
- Produced by: Max Wiedemann; Quirin Berg
- Starring: Ulrich Mühe; Martina Gedeck; Sebastian Koch; Ulrich Tukur
- Cinematography: Hagen Bogdanski
- Edited by: Patricia Rommel
- Music by: Gabriel Yared; Stéphane Moucha
- Production companies: Wiedemann & Berg; Bayerischer Rundfunk; Arte; Creado Film
- Distributed by: Buena Vista International
- Release date: 23 March 2006
- Running time: 137 minutes
- Country: Germany
- Language: German
- Budget: $2 million
- Box office: $77.3 million

The Lives of Others (German: Das Leben der Anderen, pronounced [das ˈleːbn deːɐ̯ ˈʔandəʁən]) is a 2006 German drama film written and directed by Florian Henckel von Donnersmarck, marking his feature film directorial debut. The story centres around the covert audio surveillance of East Berlin residents by a senior operative of the Stasi, the secret police of the former East Germany (German Democratic Republic). It stars Ulrich Mühe as Stasi Captain Gerd Wiesler, Ulrich Tukur as his superior Anton Grubitz, Sebastian Koch as the playwright Georg Dreyman, and Martina Gedeck as Dreyman's lover, a prominent actress named Christa-Maria Sieland.

The film was released by Buena Vista International in Germany on 23 March 2006 and by Sony Pictures Classics in North America on 7 February 2007. At the same time, the screenplay was published by Suhrkamp Verlag.

The Lives of Others won the 2007 Academy Award for Best International Feature Film. The film had earlier won seven Deutscher Filmpreis awards—including those for best film, best director, best screenplay, best actor, and best supporting actor—after setting a new record with 11 nominations. It also won the BAFTA Award for Best Film Not in the English Language and European Film Award for Best Film, while it was nominated for the Golden Globe Award for Best Foreign Language Film. The Lives of Others cost US$2 million and grossed more than US$77 million worldwide.

Released 17 years after the fall of the Berlin Wall, marking the end of the German Democratic Republic, it was the first notable drama film about the subject after a series of comedies such as Good Bye, Lenin! and Sonnenallee. This approach was widely applauded in Germany, and the film was complimented for its accurate tone despite some criticism that Wiesler's character was depicted unrealistically and with undue sympathy. The film's authenticity was considered praiseworthy, given that the director grew up outside of East Germany and was 16 when the Berlin Wall fell.

== Plot ==
In 1984 East Germany (GDR), Stasi Hauptmann Gerd Wiesler, code name HGW XX/7, is ordered by his friend and superior, Lt. Col. Anton Grubitz, to spy on playwright Georg Dreyman, whose pro-communist politics and international recognition have so far kept the state from directly monitoring him. Dreyman's apparent life as a model East German mystifies Wiesler; the playwright has no known vices or record of disloyalty or dissent at all. At the request of Minister of Culture Bruno Hempf, Wiesler and his team bug Dreyman's apartment, set up surveillance equipment, and report Dreyman's activities. Wiesler is disappointed to discover that Hempf is having Dreyman observed not for suspicions of disloyalty or dissent, but for his own lustful interest in Dreyman's girlfriend, actress Christa-Maria Sieland. After an intervention by Wiesler leads to Dreyman discovering Hempf's coercive relationship with Sieland, he implores her not to meet Hempf again and to be true to herself. She returns to Dreyman's apartment without seeing Hempf, after Wiesler influences her at a bar.

Dreyman's friend Albert Jerska, a blacklisted theatrical director, gives him sheet music for Sonate vom Guten Menschen ("Sonata for a Good Man"). Shortly afterwards, Jerska hangs himself. Dreyman realises that the GDR has not published its suicide rates since 1977, and decides to publish an article in Western media. To determine whether or not his flat is bugged, Dreyman and his friends feign a defection attempt. A sympathetic Wiesler does not report it and the conspirators believe they are safe. Since all East German typewriters are registered and identifiable, an editor of prominent West German newsweekly Der Spiegel smuggles Dreyman a Groma Büromaschinen Kolibri, an ultra-flat typewriter, which he hides under a floorboard. It has only a red ribbon, which stains his fingers.

Dreyman publishes an anonymous article in Der Spiegel accusing the state of concealing the country's elevated suicide rates. The article angers the East German authorities but the Stasi cannot link it to a registered typewriter. Rejected by Sieland, Hempf orders Grubitz to arrest her. She is blackmailed into revealing Dreyman's authorship of the article, although the Stasi do not find the typewriter. Grubitz, suspicious of Wiesler, has him conduct the follow-up interrogation of Sieland. Wiesler makes Sieland reveal the typewriter's location.

Immediately after the interrogation, Wiesler recovers the typewriter and hides it. When the Stasi return to Dreyman's apartment, Sieland realises that Dreyman will know she betrayed him and runs into the street in front of a passing truck. Dreyman runs after her and Sieland dies in his arms. Grubitz finds nothing beneath the floorboard; he ends the investigation with a perfunctory apology to Dreyman. Grubitz informs Wiesler that while the investigation is over, so is Wiesler's career; his remaining years with the Stasi will be steam-opening letters for inspection in Department M, a dead-end assignment for disgraced agents. The same day, Mikhail Gorbachev is elected leader of the Soviet Union.

Two years after the fall of the Berlin Wall, Hempf and Dreyman meet at a performance of Dreyman's play, each reflecting on life before and after German reunification. Dreyman asks why he was never monitored by the Stasi, to which Hempf replies that he had been: "We knew everything." Dreyman finds the abandoned listening devices in his apartment and rips them from the walls.

Dreyman reviews his Stasi files at the Stasi Records Agency, reading that Sieland was released just before the second search and could not have removed the typewriter. He is confused by other contradictions until, seeing a red fingerprint in the final report, he realises that the officer in charge of his surveillance – Stasi officer HGW XX/7 – had removed the typewriter from his apartment and concealed his activities, including his authorship of the suicide article. He tracks down Wiesler, who now works as a mailman, but ultimately decides not to approach him.

Two years later, Wiesler passes a bookstore window display promoting Dreyman's new novel, Sonate vom Guten Menschen ("Sonata for a Good Man"). He opens a copy of the book, discovering that it is "Dedicated to HGW XX/7, in gratitude". As he buys a copy, Wiesler is asked if he would like it giftwrapped. He replies: "No, it's for me."

== Cast ==
- Ulrich Mühe as Hauptmann Gerd Wiesler
- Sebastian Koch as Georg Dreyman
- Martina Gedeck as Christa-Maria Sieland
- Ulrich Tukur as Oberstleutnant Anton Grubitz
- Thomas Thieme as Minister Bruno Hempf
- Hans-Uwe Bauer as Paul Hauser
- Volkmar Kleinert as Albert Jerska
- Matthias Brenner as Karl Wallner
- Herbert Knaup as Gregor Hessenstein, Der Spiegel-journalist
- Charly Hübner as Udo Leveh, Wiesler's night shift
- Bastian Trost as Häftling 227, prisoner
- Marie Gruber as Frau Meineke, neighbour
- Volker Michalowski as typewriter expert
- Werner Daehn as Stasi officer-in-charge at house search
- Hinnerk Schönemann as Axel Stiegler, joketeller at Stasi
- Gabi Fleming as the prostitute "Ute"
- Ludwig Blochberger as Benedikt Lehmann, Wiesler's student

== Production ==
Florian Henckel von Donnersmarck's parents were both from East Germany (originally they were from further east; the von Donnersmarcks belonged to Silesian nobility but the region was transferred to Poland from Germany after World War II). He has said that, on visits there as a child before the Berlin Wall fell, he could sense the fear they had as subjects of the state.

He said the idea for the film came to him when he was trying to come up with a scenario for a film class. He was listening to music and recalled Maxim Gorky's saying that Lenin's favorite piece of music was Beethoven's Appassionata. Gorky recounted a discussion with Lenin:

And screwing up his eyes and chuckling, [Lenin] added without mirth: But I can't listen to music often, it affects my nerves, it makes me want to say sweet nothings and pat the heads of people who, living in a filthy hell, can create such beauty. But today we mustn't pat anyone on the head or we'll get our hand bitten off; we've got to hit them on the heads, hit them without mercy, though in the ideal we are against doing any violence to people. Hm-hm—it's a hellishly difficult office!

Donnersmarck told a New York Times reporter: "I suddenly had this image in my mind of a person sitting in a depressing room with earphones on his head and listening in to what he supposes is the enemy of the state and the enemy of his ideas, and what he is really hearing is beautiful music that touches him. I sat down and in a couple of hours had written the treatment." The screenplay was written during an extended visit to his uncle's monastery, Heiligenkreuz Abbey.

Although the opening scene is set in Hohenschönhausen prison (which is now the site of a memorial dedicated to the victims of Stasi oppression), the film could not be shot there because Hubertus Knabe, the director of the memorial, refused to give Donnersmarck permission. Knabe objected to "making the Stasi man into a hero" and tried to persuade Donnersmarck to change the film. Donnersmarck cited Schindler's List as an example of such a plot development being possible. Knabe's answer: "But that is exactly the difference. There was a Schindler. There was no Wiesler."

Donnersmarck teamed up with cinematographer Hagen Bogdanski to bring the story to life. Describing his inspiration for the film's Brechtian grey color palette, cinematographer Bogdanski recalls the streets of East Berlin from the period: "They were very dark. Everything was happening inside, in private".

== Reception ==
The film was received with widespread acclaim. Film aggregate site Rotten Tomatoes reports a 92% rating, based on 149 positive reviews out of 163, and an average rating of 8.31/10. The website's critical consensus states: "Unlike more traditional spy films, The Lives of Others doesn't sacrifice character for cloak and dagger chases, and the performances (notably that by the late Ulrich Muhe) stay with you." It also has a score of 89 out of 100 on Metacritic, based on 39 critics.

A review in Daily Variety by Derek Elley described the film as "a superbly cast drama", which "balances the many dramatic and emotional strands between the players with poise and clarity". Time magazine's Richard Corliss named the film one of the Top 10 Movies of 2007, ranking it at #2 and praising a "poignant, unsettling thriller".

Film critic Roger Ebert gave the film four out of four, describing it as "a powerful but quiet film, constructed of hidden thoughts and secret desires". A. O. Scott, reviewing the film in The New York Times, wrote that Lives is well-plotted, and added, "The suspense comes not only from the structure and pacing of the scenes, but also, more deeply, from the sense that even in an oppressive society, individuals are burdened with free will. You never know, from one moment to the next, what course any of the characters will choose." Los Angeles Times critic Kenneth Turan agreed that the dramatic tension comes from being "meticulously plotted", and that "it places its key characters in high-stakes predicaments where what they are forced to wager is their talent, their very lives, even their souls". The film "convincingly demonstrates that when done right, moral and political quandaries can be the most intensely dramatic dilemmas of all".

American conservative commentators particularly enjoyed the film and read conservative themes into its depiction of authoritarianism. John Podhoretz called the film "one of the greatest movies ever made, and certainly the best film of this decade". William F. Buckley, Jr. wrote in his syndicated column that after the film was over, "I turned to my companion and said, 'I think that is the best movie I ever saw.'" John J. Miller of National Review Online named it number one in his list of "The Best Conservative Movies" of the last 25 years.

Several critics pointed to the film's subtle building up of details as one of its prime strengths. The film is built "on layers of emotional texture", wrote Stephanie Zacharek in Salon online magazine. Josh Rosenblatt, writing in the Austin Chronicle called the film "a triumph of muted grandeur". Lisa Schwarzbaum, writing in Entertainment Weekly, pointed out that some of the subtlety is due to the fact that its "tensest moments take place with the most minimal of action" but that the director still "conveys everything he wants us to know about choice, fear, doubt, cowardice, and heroism". An article in First Things makes a philosophical argument in defense of Wiesler's transformation. The East German dissident songwriter Wolf Biermann was guardedly enthusiastic about the film, writing in a March 2006 article in Die Welt: "The political tone is authentic, I was moved by the plot. But why? Perhaps I was just won over sentimentally, because of the seductive mass of details which look like they were lifted from my own past between the total ban of my work in 1965 and denaturalisation in 1976".

Anna Funder, the author of the book Stasiland, in a review for The Guardian called The Lives of Others a "superb film" despite not being true to reality. She claims that it was not possible for a Stasi operative to have hidden information from superiors because Stasi employees themselves were watched and almost always operated in teams.

In a 2016 BBC poll, critics voted the film the 32nd greatest since 2000. In 2021, members of Writers Guild of America West (WGAW) and Writers Guild of America, East (WGAE) voted its screenplay 52nd in WGA’s 101 Greatest Screenplays of the 21st Century (So Far). In 2025, the film ranked number 48 on The New York Times's list of "The 100 Best Movies of the 21st Century" and was one of the films voted for the "Readers' Choice" edition of the list, finishing at number 107.

According to German author Christoph Hein, the film is loosely based on his life story. In a 2019 article, he recalls that Donnersmarck interviewed him in 2002, and that his name was mentioned in the opening credits at the premiere. In Hein's opinion, the overly dramatic events of the film bear little resemblance to his life experience, which is why he asked Donnersmarck to delete his name from the credits. In Hein's words, "the movie does not depict the 1980s in the GDR" but is a "scary tale taking place in a fantasy land, comparable to Tolkien's Middle-earth".

=== Awards and honors ===
The film and its principals have won numerous awards. Among the most prestigious are:

- 79th Academy Awards
  - Best International Feature Film
- 61st British Academy Film Awards
  - Best Film Not in the English Language
- César Awards
  - Best Foreign Film
- European Film Awards
  - Best Film
  - Best Actor: Ulrich Mühe
  - Best Screenwriter: Florian Henckel von Donnersmarck
- German Film Awards
  - Best Film
  - Best Actor
  - Best Supporting Actor
  - Best Director
  - Best Cinematography
  - Best Production Design
  - Best Screenplay
- Bavarian Film Awards 2006
  - Best Actor: Ulrich Mühe
  - Best Newcomer Director: Florian Henckel von Donnersmarck
  - Best Screenplay: Florian Henckel von Donnersmarck
- Vilnius International Film Festival
  - The Audience Award

The Lives of Others also appeared on many critics' lists of the ten best films of 2007.

- 1st: James Berardinelli, ReelViews
- 1st: Shawn Levy, The Oregonian
- 2nd: Empire
- 2nd: Marjorie Baumgarten, The Austin Chronicle
- 2nd: Michael Sragow, The Baltimore Sun
- 2nd: Richard Corliss, TIME magazine
- 3rd: Rene Rodriguez, The Miami Herald
- 4th: David Ansen, Newsweek
- 4th: Stephen Holden, The New York Times
- 5th: Roger Ebert, Chicago Sun Times
- 5th: Richard Roeper, Chicago Sun Times
- 5th: Liam Lacey and Rick Groen, The Globe and Mail
- 5th: Owen Gleiberman, Entertainment Weekly
- 7th: Christy Lemire, Associated Press
- 7th: Tasha Robinson, The A.V. Club
- 8th: A.O. Scott, The New York Times (tied with Michael Clayton)
- 8th: Kyle Smith, New York Post

=== Acclaim ===
The Europe List, the largest survey on European culture established that the top three films in European culture are:

1. Roberto Benigni's Life is Beautiful
2. Donnersmarck's The Lives of Others
3. Jean-Pierre Jeunet's Amélie

Belgium, Denmark, Germany, Greece, Ireland, Netherlands and Sweden had the film at number one.

== Proposed remake ==
In February 2007, Sydney Pollack and Anthony Minghella announced a deal with The Weinstein Company to produce and direct an English-language remake of The Lives of Others. Minghella died in March 2008 and Pollack died less than three months later.

== Influence ==
=== Israeli intelligence controversy ===
In September 2014, 43 members of the Israeli elite clandestine Unit 8200 wrote a letter to Israel's prime minister and army chief, refusing further service and claiming Israel made "no distinction between Palestinians who are and are not involved in violence" and that information collected "harms innocent people". One of these people named a viewing of The Lives of Others as "the transformational moment".

=== 2013 mass surveillance disclosures ===
The Lives of Others has been referred to in political protests following the 2013 mass surveillance disclosures. Daniel Ellsberg in an interview with Brad Friedman on KPFK/Pacifica Radio republished on salon.com stressed the importance of The Lives of Others in light of Edward Snowden's revelations:

Ellsberg: My knowledge of the Stasi is not very extensive, but it's largely from a movie called The Lives of Others, which won the Oscar for "Best Foreign Film" some years ago. Everybody should get that now. It should be reissued now. Preferably. It has subtitles. In German. But I'd like to see it dubbed so it had a wider audience. What that shows is what life can be with a government that knew as much as the Stasi did then. But if they know – and one thing they can do with that information right now – is to turn people into informants, so that the government has not only the information that people say on electronic devices, they have what they say in the bedroom, because their wife or their whoever – spouse – is an informant. As happened in the movie. That is what did happen in East Germany. And if we were to get that here, and there's the infrastructure for it right now, we will become a democratic republic in the same sense as the East German Democratic Republic.

Film critic and historian Carrie Rickey believes that The Lives of Others was one of two movies that influenced Snowden's actions, the other being the 1974 Francis Ford Coppola film The Conversation, both being about wiretappers troubled by guilt.

Both movies are about the morality of surveillance and the questionable reliability of information harvested – and how listeners can be duped and/or can misinterpret raw data. I would recommend these films to anyone interested in great movies that touch on the issues raised by L'Affaire Snowden.

On 25 June 2013, after revelations of collaboration between the NSA and GCHQ, British journalist and documentary maker Sarfraz Manzoor tweeted that "Now would be a good time to pitch a British remake of The Lives of Others." On 16 July 2013, American novelist and frequent cable news commentator Brad Thor stated: "At what point did the Obama administration acquire the rights to reenact The Lives of Others?"

French President Nicolas Sarkozy gave an interview in Le Figaro expressing his outrage over his being the target of surveillance. He drew a direct comparison to the film: "This is not a scene from that marvellous film The Lives of Others, about East Germany and the activities of the Stasi. It is not the case of some dictator acting against his political opponents. This is France." Because of this interview, sales of Le Figaro more than doubled.

== Libel suit ==
Henckel von Donnersmarck and Ulrich Mühe were successfully sued for libel for an interview in which Mühe asserted that his second wife, Jenny Gröllmann, informed the Stasi about his activities while they were East German citizens through the six years of their marriage. Mühe's former wife denied the claims, although 254 pages of government records detailed her activities. However, Gröllmann's real-life controller later claimed he had made up many of the details in the file and that the actress had been unaware that she was speaking to a Stasi agent.

== Stage adaptation ==
In April 2026 a stage adaptation was announced, directed by Robert Icke and produced by Sonia Friedman, with an opening scheduled for 14 October 2026 at the Adelphi Theatre. It will star Keira Knightley as Sieland, Luke Thompson as Dreyman, and Stephen Dillane as Wiesler.

== Literature and music ==
- Florian Henckel von Donnersmarck: Das Leben der anderen. Suhrkamp, Frankfurt am Main 2006, ISBN 3-518-45786-1
- Florian Henckel von Donnersmarck: Das Leben der anderen. Geschwärzte Ausgabe. Suhrkamp, Frankfurt am Main 2007, ISBN 3-518-45908-2
- The piano sonata "Sonata for a Good Man", used as the main transformation point of the Stasi Agent Gerd Wiesler, does not carry the name of the composer, as it is original music written for the film by Gabriel Yared.
- Regarding Beethoven's Appassionata, Lenin is quoted as having said that: "If I keep listening to it, I won't finish the revolution".
- An excerpt from a 1920 poem by Bertold Brecht, "Reminiscence of Marie A.", is recited in the film in a scene in which Wiesler reads it on his couch, having taken it from Dreyman's desk.
- The poem "Versuch es" by Wolfgang Borchert is set to music in the film and played as Dreyman writes the article about suicide. Borchert was a playwright whose life was destroyed by his experience of being drafted into the Wehrmacht in World War II and fighting on the Eastern Front.

== See also ==
- List of films featuring surveillance
- Telephone tapping in the Eastern Bloc
