= Telephone tapping in the Eastern Bloc =

State surveillance of telephones in Warsaw Pact nations

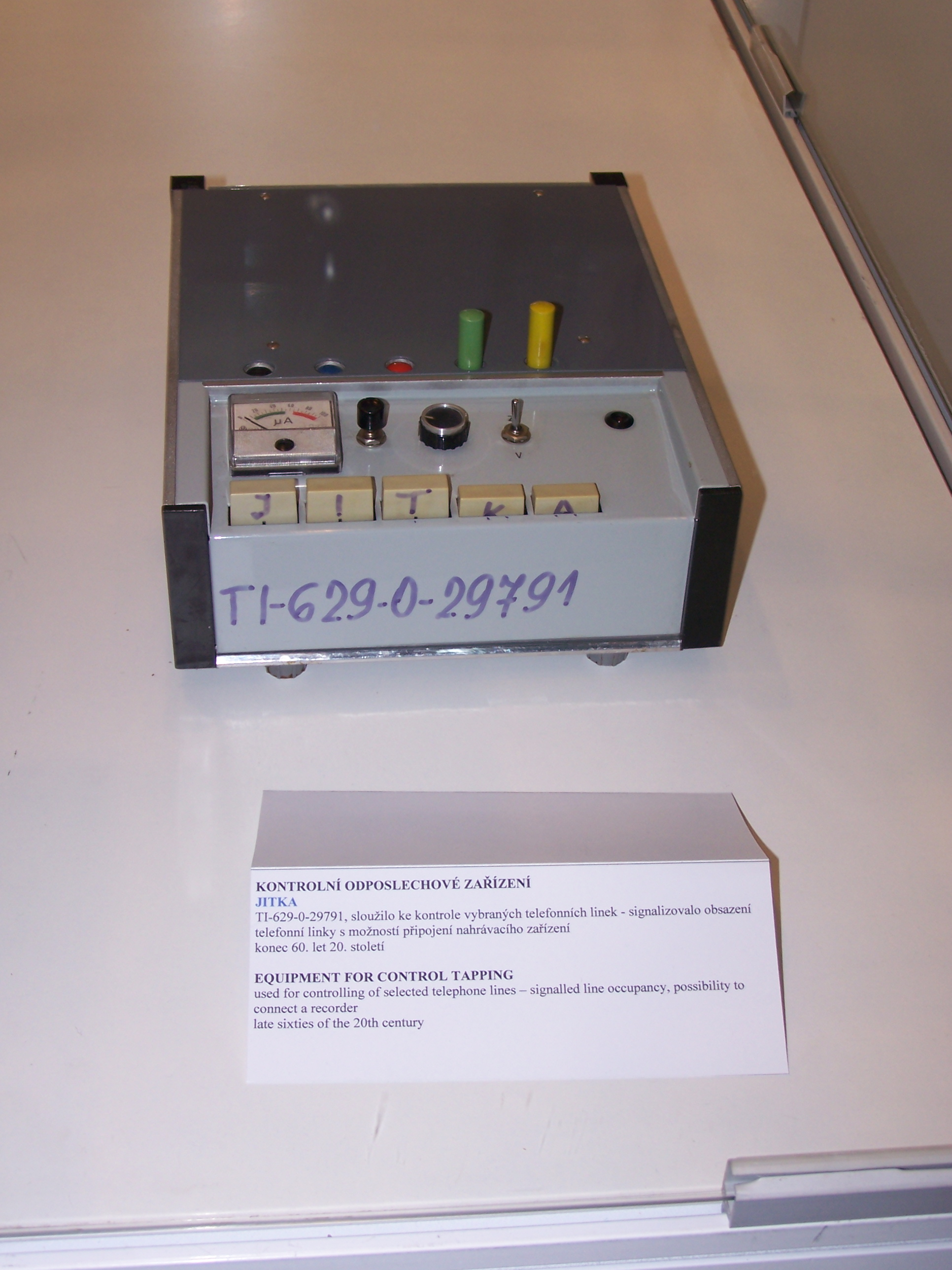
"Jitka" telephone tapping equipment; signaled that the line was busy, allowed the connection of a recorder, late sixties of 20th century, used by Czechoslovak StB

Telephone tapping in the Eastern Bloc was a widespread method of the mass surveillance of the population by the secret police.

== History ==
In the past, telephone tapping was an open and legal practice in certain countries. During martial law in Poland, official censorship was introduced, which included open phone tapping. Despite the introduction of the new censorship division, the Polish secret police did not have resources to monitor all conversations.

In Romania, telephone tapping was conducted by the General Directorate for Technical Operations of the Securitate. Created with Soviet assistance in 1954, the outfit monitored all voice and electronic communications inside and outside of Romania. They bugged telephones and intercepted all telegraphs and telex messages, as well as placed microphones in both public and private buildings.

== Fiction ==
The 1991 Polish comedy film Calls Controlled capitalizes on this fact. The title alludes to the pre-recorded message "Rozmowa kontrolowana" ("The call is being monitored") being sounded during phone calls while the martial law in Poland was in force during the 1980s.

The 2006 film The Lives of Others concerns a Stasi captain who is listening to the conversations of a suspected dissident writer in a bugged apartment with equipment including telephone-tapping.

== See also ==
- Covert listening device
- Eastern Bloc politics
- Echelon (signals intelligence)
- Mass surveillance
- Privacy of correspondence
- Secure telephone
