= The Castle (1997 Austrian film) =

Film by Michael Haneke

- Das Schloß
- Based on: Das Schloss by Franz Kafka
- Written by: Michael Haneke
- Directed by: Michael Haneke
- Starring: Ulrich Mühe; Susanne Lothar
- Country of origin: Austria
- Original language: German

Production
- Producers: Veit Heiduschka; Christina Undritz
- Cinematography: Jirí Stibr
- Editor: Andreas Prochaska
- Running time: 123 minutes

Original release
- Release: 1997

The Castle (German: Das Schloß) is a 1997 film by Austrian director Michael Haneke. It is an adaptation of Franz Kafka's absurdist 1926 novel released theatrically in Germany, the Czech Republic, Japan, Canada, and the United States, but first shown on television in Austria.

== Plot ==
When land surveyor K. (Ulrich Mühe) arrives at a small village that houses a castle, local authorities refuse to allow him to enter. As he tries to convince the officials that they sent for him, they clamp down with increasingly complicated bureaucratic obstacles.

== Production and release ==
Das Schloß was filmed in Styria.

The film premiered at the 47th Berlin International Film Festival in February 1997.
