= Der letzte Zeuge =

- Genre: Crime
- Created by: Gregor Edelmann
- Starring: Ulrich Mühe; Gesine Cukrowski; Jörg Gudzuhn
- Composer: Günther Fischer
- Country of origin: Germany
- No. of seasons: 9
- No. of episodes: 73

Production
- Running time: 50 minutes

Original release
- Network: ZDF
- Release: 23 March 1998 – 2007

Der letzte Zeuge (The Last Witness) is a German crime television series set in Berlin. Created by Gregor Edelmann, it aired on ZDF from 1998 to 2007 and was mostly directed by Bernhard Stephan. It stars Ulrich Mühe as medical examiner Dr Robert Kolmaar, along with Gesine Cukrowski as his colleague Dr Judith Sommer and Jörg Gudzuhn as police officer Johannes "Joe" Hoffer.

After Mühe's death in 2007, both Gudzuhn and Cukrowski stated they did not want to continue without him, which is why the ZDF would later announce the series' termination.

== Episodes ==
=== Season 1 (1998) ===
1. The triangle of death (Das Dreieck des Todes)
2. The night a goner dies (Die Nacht, in der ein Toter stirbt)
3. Sweet death (Der süße Tod)
4. Since they're aware of what they're doing (Denn sie wissen, was sie tun)
5. When two moons collide (Wenn sich zwei Monde kreuzen)
6. When evil awakes (Wenn das Böse erwacht)

=== Season 2 (1999) ===
1. Flies, maggots, death (Die Fliegen, die Maden, der Tod)
2. For vengeance is mine (Denn die Rache ist mein)
3. Hovering angels (Schwebende Engel)
4. Stroke upon stroke (Schlag auf Schlag)
5. Bank, love, death (Die Bank, die Liebe, der Tod)
6. Kill your enemy's enemy (Töte den Feind deines Feindes)
7. Under the skin (Unter die Haut)

=== Season 3 (2000) ===
1. Death of the white knight (Der Tod des weißen Ritters)
2. A man returns (Ein Mann kommt zurück)
3. The extortion (Die Erpressung)
4. Family ties (Familienbande)
5. The fourth man (Der vierte Mann)
6. The road to hell (Der Weg zur Hölle)
7. Three years and one night (Drei Jahre und eine Nacht)
8. The last image (Das letzte Bild)

=== Season 4 (2002) ===
1. Holy war (Der heilige Krieg)
2. A walkover (Ein Kinderspiel)
3. Death of a star (Tod eines Stars)
4. The duel (Das Duell)
5. The abduction (Die Entführung)
6. The trap (Im Netz)
7. Some, they say, are condemned (Manche, sagt man, sind verdammt)

=== Season 5 (2003) ===
1. The day a bird fell from the sky (Der Tag, an dem ein Vogel vom Himmel fiel)
2. The value of truth (Der Preis der Wahrheit)
3. The bullet in the way of the world (Die Kugel im Lauf der Dinge)
4. The alumni reunion (Das Klassentreffen)
5. The show goes on (Die Show geht weiter)
6. One won't die in the shade (Im Schatten stirbt man nicht)
7. The curse of the last king (Der Fluch des letzten Königs)
8. Skin of iron (Haut aus Eisen)

=== Season 6 (2004) ===
1. I hate my mother (Ich hasse meine Mutter)
2. The green diamond (Der grüne Diamand)
3. The curse of the lost treasures (Der Fluch der verlorenen Schätze)
4. The ones longing for love (Die sich nach Liebe sehnen)
5. White noise (Das weiße Rauschen)
6. The anatomy of the heart (Anatomie des Herzens)
7. Bitter in the finish (Bitter im Abgang)
8. The forgotten death (Der vergessene Tod)
9. The boys from Dahlem (Die Jungs aus Dahlem)
10. Burning craving (Brennende Gier)
11. The nightmare (Der Albtraum)
12. Frogs, children, death (Die Frösche, die Kinder, der Tod)
13. Childhood sweetheart (Sandkastenliebe)

=== Season 7 (2005) ===
1. The muckraker (Die Sensationsreporterin)
2. There's life in the liars yet (Lügner leben länger)
3. The deceased on the marsh (Die Tote aus dem Moor)
4. The wheel of life (Das Rad des Lebens)
5. The unscrupulous woman (Die Frau ohne Gewissen)

=== Season 8 (2006) ===
1. Children of rage (Kinder des Zorns)
2. Doors into the night (Türen in der Nacht)
3. Late love (Späte Liebe)
4. Death of a dancer (Tod eines Tänzers)
5. The [female] judge (Die Richterin)
6. Gambit star (Gambit Star)
7. In the glass coffin (Im gläsernen Sarg)
8. The pink smile (Das rosa Lächeln)
9. I die, you live (Ich sterbe, du lebst)
10. The murderer of my son (Der Mörder meines Sohnes)

=== Season 9 (2007) ===
1. The murderer's handwriting (Die Handschrift des Mörders)
2. Fatal desire (Tödliche Lust)
3. Hushed up (Totgeschwiegen)
4. The Martins-Passion (Martinspassion)
5. Among sisters (Unter Schwestern)
6. The victory in blood (Den Sieg im Blut)
7. Deadly beauty (Tödliche Schönheit)
8. The poison of silence (Das Gift des Schweigens)
9. The murderer's tidings (Botschaft des Mörders)

== See also ==
- List of German television series

== Sources ==
- Recension on the 9th season on Splashmovies
- Episode guide on the series
