= Fritz Haneke =

Fritz Haneke (June 1, 1906 in Münster - March 16, 1989) was a German actor and theatre director.

== Life ==
He received his acting training in Düsseldorf. Haneke appeared in numerous television and theater roles. Around 1932, he initially resided in Frankfurt am Main, at Elbestr. 46, and subsequently in Guben in 1933, living at Neißestraße 104. He was married to the actress Beatrix von Degenschild, with whom he had at least one son, the future director Michael Haneke (born March 23, 1942), who was born in Munich. The family later moved to Wiener Neustadt. Other venues included Fürth (1938), Salzburg (1940), and Bremen (1949), where he also served as director. In the approximately 60-minute film adaptation of Thomas Mann's novella Herr und Hund (A Man and His Dog ) in 1962, directed by Cas van den Berg and based on a screenplay by Erika Mann and van den Berg, he played the man (i.e., Thomas Mann). According to a 2009 report in The Guardian, he met his future wife Beatrix during the Second World War while performing for the troops. Haneke left his family when their son was almost 3 years old, and they did not reunite until he reached adulthood.

== Directorial works (selection) ==
- March 26, 1956: Blood Wedding by Federico García Lorca (1898–1936) at the Salzburg State Theatre

== Filmography (selection) ==
- 1964: The Fifth Column (Episode 4: Shadow Play)
- 1966: Behind these walls
- 1969: Double Agent George Blake (TV movie)
- 1975: Court Theatre (TV series, various episodes)
