= Jenny Gröllmann =

German actress (1947–2006)

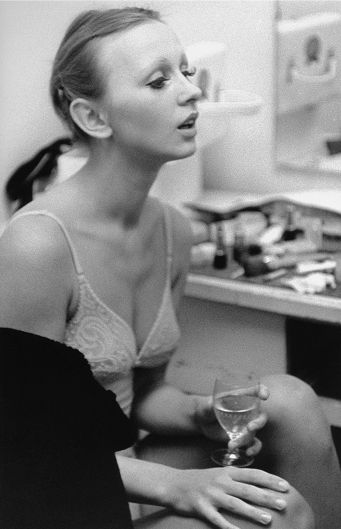
- Gröllmann in the late 1960s
- Born: 5 February 1947; Hamburg, British Zone, Allied-occupied Germany
- Died: 9 August 2006 (aged 59); Berlin, Germany
- Occupation: Actress
- Years active: 1961–2006
- Spouses: Michael Kann (m. 1973; div. 1982) Ulrich Mühe (m. 1984; div. 1990) Claus-Jürgen Pfeiffer (m. 2004)
- Children: 2, including Anna Maria Mühe

Jenny Gröllmann (5 February 1947 – 9 August 2006) was a German actress, best known for her work on films I Was Nineteen (1968), Peas at 5:30 (2004) and her recurring role on the show Polizeiruf 110. She won an Ernst Zinna Prize of the city of Berlin in 1974.

== Biography ==
Gröllmann was born in Hamburg, the daughter of Gertrud, a theater photographer and Otto, stage designer.

In 1949, the family moved to the Soviet zone of occupation in Schwerin and in 1955 they moved to Dresden, where the father had been given a job.

In 1961, she played the main role in Bertolt Brecht's play The Visions of Simone Machard.

Gröllmann married fellow actor Ulrich Mühe in 1984. The following year, she gave birth to a daughter, Anna Maria Mühe. They divorced in 1990, with Mühe later alleging in a book accompanying his film The Lives of Others that she had been a unofficial collaborator who reported on his activities to the Stasi. Gröllmann denied she had ever been a collaborator, winning a court injunction to prevent the publisher from releasing the book in 2006.

== Death ==
Gröllmann died of breast cancer on 6 August 2006 in Berlin. She was 59 years old.

== Selected filmography ==
- Netzwerk (1970)
- Peas at 5:30 (2004)
