= Nemesis (2010 film) =

2010 film by Nicole Mosleh

Nemesis is a 2010 German drama film, marking the last work of actor Ulrich Mühe and the feature film debut of writer-director Nicole Mosleh. It tells the story of an estranged couple, played by Mühe and his wife Susanne Lothar. The film was shot in 2006 in Italy. Ulrich Mühe was diagnosed with cancer while the film was in post-production and died before the film was finished.

A legal battle with Susanne Lothar, Mühes widow, prevented a release of the film for three years. It premiered at the Hof International Film Festival in Germany in 2010.

== Plot ==
Claire (Lothar) and Robert (Mühe) seem to have a perfect life. The two German expatriates spend most of their time in a house they own in the beautiful and remote countryside in Italy. But when Claire's sister gets murdered in the very same house, the traumatic event threatens their relationship. Disappointment, fear and resentment they swept under the rug for years, resurface. Claire and Robert are forced to confront the disintegration of their marriage. In a horrendous last night together, a long kept secret that has suffocated their relationship emerges.
