= Benny's Video =

1992 Austrian-Swiss psychological thriller film by Michael Haneke

- Directed by: Michael Haneke
- Written by: Michael Haneke
- Produced by: Veit Heiduschka
- Starring: Arno Frisch; Angela Winkler; Ulrich Mühe
- Cinematography: Christian Berger
- Edited by: Marie Homolkova
- Production companies: Lang Film; Wega Film
- Distributed by: Wega Film
- Release dates: 13 May 1992 (Cannes); 12 September 1992 (TIFF)
- Running time: 110 minutes
- Countries: Austria; Switzerland
- Language: German

Benny's Video is a 1992 psychological horror film directed by Michael Haneke and starring Arno Frisch, Angela Winkler, and Ulrich Mühe. Set in Vienna, it centers on Benny, a teenager who views much of his life as distilled through video images, and his well-to-do parents Anna and Georg, who enable Benny's focus on video cameras and images. The film won the FIPRESCI Award at the 1993 European Film Awards.

== Plot ==
Teenage Benny is obsessed with film recordings and cameras. His emotionally absent parents, Georg and Anna, provide him with televisions, cassette players, and recording devices to encourage their son's hobby, seemingly unaware of his fascination with filmed violence. Benny repeatedly views a home video he shot on a European farm, which captures the slaughter of a pig with a captive bolt pistol.

A party centered on a game called Pilot and Passengers is broken up by Georg and Anna when they return home. Eva, their daughter who lives separately from them, is the host of the party, and it is revealed through the questioning of Benny that Eva has taken advantage of her parents' planned absence to host the impromptu party in their house.

When Georg and Anna depart again for the weekend, Benny invites a girl he has seen outside the local video store to his home. After they watch the video of the pig slaughter, he unveils the slaughtering gun and kills the girl, which is captured on a video monitor. After choir practice, Benny returns home and arranges an evening out with friends before moving the dead body and cleaning up the blood, which Benny continues to capture on video. He goes to a dance club and stays overnight at his friend's house. On his way home, he has his head shaven.

At his home, Benny's father harangues him about his haircut. While the family is watching the news in Benny's room, Benny switches the video to the one he has made about him killing the girl. Benny reveals the body in his closet, and Georg removes the videotape. In the living room, Georg and Anna discuss their options and ultimately decide to dismember the body.

Anna takes Benny away on vacation to Egypt, and Benny seems barely affected by the murder he committed. They return home after six days and Georg has cleaned the apartment of any traces of the murder. When Georg asks Benny why he killed the girl, Benny replies nonchalantly.

On video, a pilot and passengers appear in a party hosted by Eva, this time with Georg and Anna's permission. In reality, Anna and Georg watch the video with Benny and discuss how well their daughter does playing the game. Later, Georg and Anna attend the concert of the choir Benny is in. Again in reality, Benny's recording of his parents discussing the disposal of the body is shown and a voice-over asks, "Why did you come to us now?" Benny is being interviewed by policemen, and he answers merely, "Because". With no following questions, Benny asks if he can leave now. Afterwards, Benny meets Georg and Anna in the hall and, after a long moment, says, "Entschuldigung" (translated as "Sorry"). On video, his parents are seen escorted by police officers.

== Cast ==
- Arno Frisch as Benny
- Angela Winkler as Anna, Benny's mother
- Ulrich Mühe as Georg, Benny's father
- Stephanie Brehme as Eva
- Stefan Polasek as Ricci
- Ingrid Stassner as Mädchen
- Christian Pundy
- Max Berner
- Hanspeter Müller
- Shelley Kästner

== Analysis ==
Writing in The Pleasure and Pain of Cult Horror Films: An Historical Survey (2009), Bartłomiej Paszylk notes that Benny's Video captures the phenomenon of the "video culture" that began in the 1980s and was continuing to develop at the time the film was made.

Some critics and viewers, including filmmaker Maximilian Le Cain, note that, despite Benny's act of violence, he remains a sympathetic character, and that the film ultimately thematically indicts his disaffected parents. Paszylk suggests that the film is structured in a way that makes it "tough to recognize the movie's true villain."

Film scholar Catherine Wheatley observes that the film prominently features a "metatextual troubling of levels of reality" through its aesthetic integration of Benny's handheld camcorder footage, sound, and static cameras, rendering the audience in an "extremely distanced, 'objective' relationship to the narrative."

== Release ==
Benny's Video premiered at the Cannes Film Festival on 13 May 1992. It subsequently opened at the New York Film Festival on 28 September 1993.

=== Critical response ===
Stephen Holden of The New York Times praised the film, writing: "What gives the film a chilly authenticity is the creepy performance of Arno Frisch in the title role. Cool and unsmiling, with a dark inscrutable gaze, his Benny is the apotheosis of what the author George W. S. Trow has called "the cold child," or an unfeeling young person whose detachment and short attention span have been molded by television. Or in other words, Mr. Trow adds, "A sadist."" The film earned an "honorable mention" nod from William Arnold of the Seattle Post-Intelligencer in his list of the best films of 1994.

Writing for Film4, Matt Glasby described the film as "the cinema of dread rather than of surprise; a curtain-twitching thriller (sans thrills) about how evil creeps in unseen when all seems safe, still and banal."

Eric Henderson, reviewing the film for Slant Magazine in 2006, derided it, deeming it "a smug, contemptuous, passive-aggressive attack on the dehumanizing effects of media, without even the common decency to offer shrill sensationalism to punch up its subsequently feckless, reactionary, pomo assertions."

On the review aggregator website Rotten Tomatoes, 62% of 13 critics' reviews are positive. Metacritic, which uses a weighted average, assigned the film a score of 60 out of 100, based on 9 critics, indicating "mixed or average" reviews.

=== Home media ===
Kino International released the film on DVD in 2006. The Criterion Collection released the film on Blu-ray in December 2022 as part of a Michael Haneke trilogy comprising his first three films, alongside The Seventh Continent (1989) and 71 Fragments of a Chronology of Chance (1994). In July 2025 the film was included in the Michael Haneke Collection Blu-ray which was released by Umbrella Entertainment. On 6 October 2025 Curzon included the film in their Haneke collection box-set.

== Sources ==
- Paszylk, Bartłomiej (2009). The Pleasure and Pain of Cult Horror Films: An Historical Survey. Jefferson, North Carolina: McFarland. ISBN 978-0-786-45327-6.
- Wheatley, Catherine (2009). Michael Haneke's Cinema: The Ethic of the Image. New York City, New York: Berghahn Books. ISBN 978-0-857-45546-8.
