= Anna Maria Mühe =

German actress (born 1985)

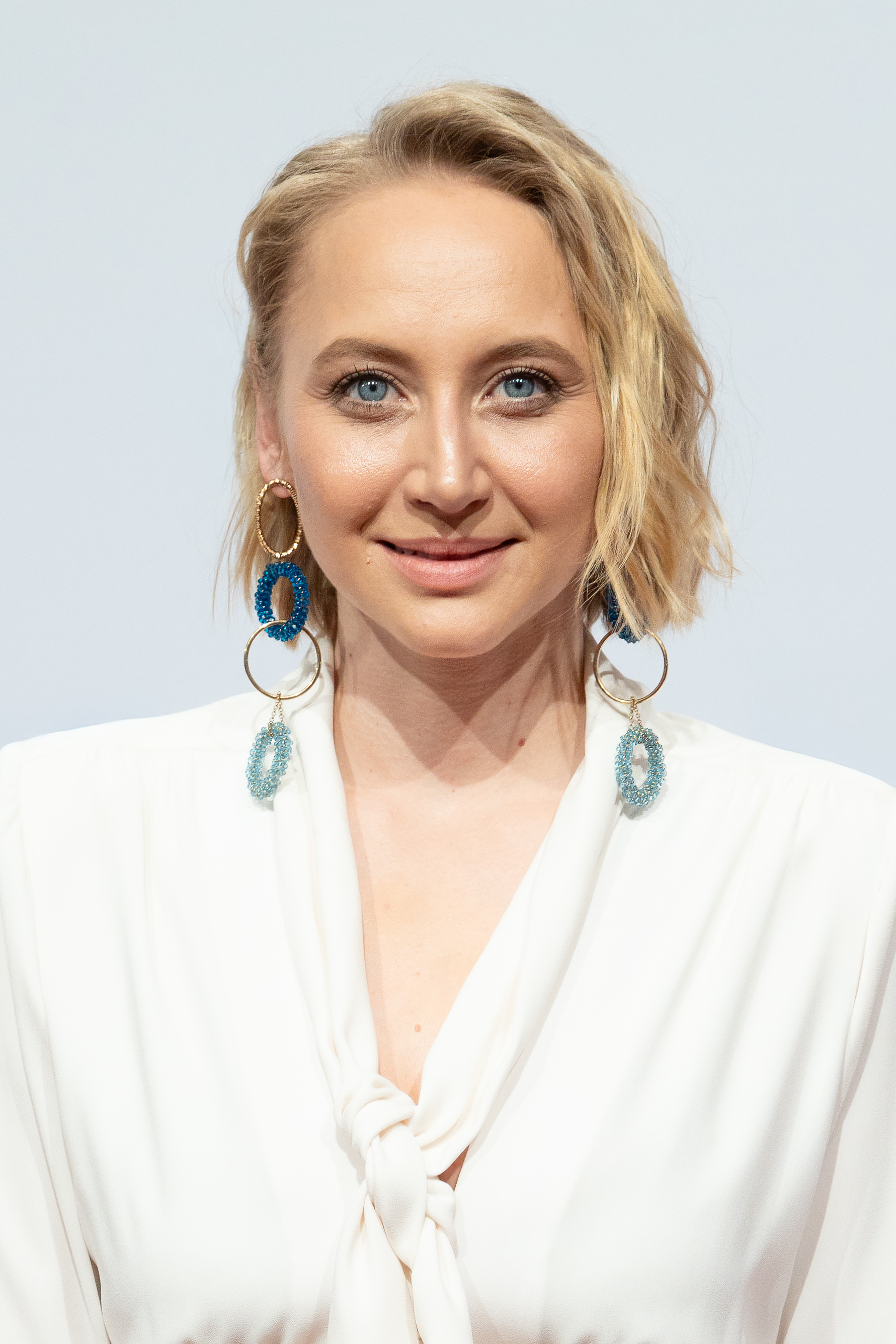
- Mühe in 2020
- Born: Anna Maria Mühe; 23 July 1985 (age 40); East Berlin, East Germany
- Occupation: Actress
- Years active: 2002-present
- Parent(s): Ulrich Mühe (1953-2007); Jenny Gröllmann (1947-2006)

Anna Maria Mühe (born 23 July 1985) is a German actress.

== Biography ==
Born in Berlin to actor Ulrich Mühe (1953-2007) and actress Jenny Gröllmann (1947-2006), she was invited by director Maria von Heland to a casting for Big Girls don't cry. She also played in a video of Schiller's song "Sehnsucht".

== Awards ==
- Golden Camera for Best Newcomer
- Shooting Stars Award 2012, annual acting award for up-and-coming actors by European Film Promotion.

== Selected filmography ==
- Big Girls Don't Cry (2002)
- Love in Thoughts (2004)
- Tatort: Verraten und verkauft (2003, TV series episode)
- Delphinsommer (2004)
- Escape (2004)
- Die letzte Schlacht (2005)
- Running on Empty (2006)
- Twisted Sister (2006)
- Lunik (2007)
- November Child (2008)
- The Bill: Proof of Life (2008, TV series episode)
- Leipzig Homicide: Entführung in London (2008, TV series episode)
- The Countess (2009)
- Anna and the Prince (2009, TV film)
- In the World You Have Fear (2011)
- Cracks in the Shell (2011)
- Fly Away (2012)
- Deckname Luna (2012, TV film)
- Not My Day (2014)
- Divine Sparks (2014, TV film)
- NSU German History X (2016)
- Family! (2016, TV film)
- My Blind Date With Life (2017)
- Dogs of Berlin (2018, TV series)
- Bauhaus - A New Era (2019, TV series)
- Lassie Come Home (2020)
- Totenfrau (2022, TV series)
