= Florian Henckel von Donnersmarck =

German film director and screenwriter (born 1973)

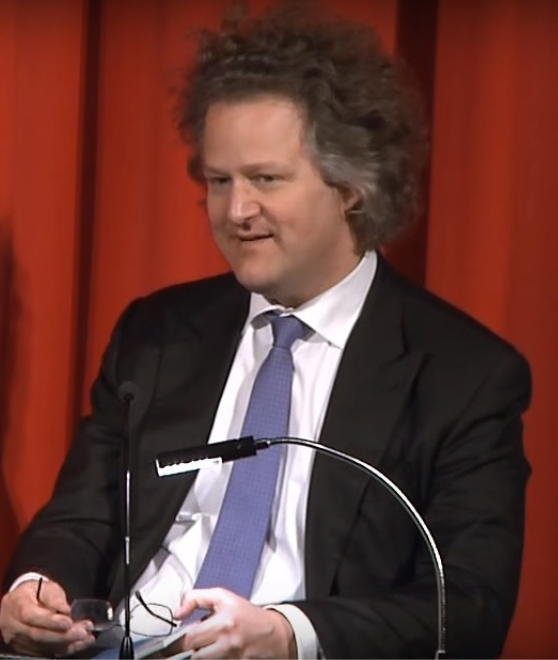
- Henckel von Donnersmarck in 2015
- Born: Florian Maria Georg Christian Graf Henckel von Donnersmarck; 2 May 1973 (age 53); Cologne, West Germany
- Occupation: Film director
- Years active: 1996–present
- Spouse: Christiane Asschenfeldt
- Children: 3 (including Lara Cosima)
- Parent(s): Count Leo-Ferdinand Henckel von Donnersmarck; Countess Anna Maria von Berg

Florian Maria Georg Christian Graf Henckel von Donnersmarck (German: [ˈfloː.ʁi.aːn ˈhɛŋ.kl̩ fɔn ˈdɔ.nɐsˌmaʁk]; born 2 May 1973) is a German-Austrian film director. He is best known for writing and directing the 2006 dramatic thriller Das Leben der Anderen (The Lives of Others), which won the Academy Award for Best Foreign Language Film. He also wrote and directed the 2010 romantic thriller The Tourist starring Angelina Jolie and Johnny Depp, and the 2018 epic drama Never Look Away.

== Early years ==
Henckel von Donnersmarck was born in 1973 in Cologne, West Germany, into the aristocratic Roman Catholic Henckel von Donnersmarck family. He grew up in New York City, Brussels, Frankfurt, and West Berlin and is fluent in English, German, French, Russian, and Italian.

After graduating at the top of his class from the German section of the European School of Brussels I, he studied Russian literature in St. Petersburg for two years and passed the State Exam for Teachers of Russian as a Foreign Language. He then read philosophy, politics, and economics at New College, Oxford, and received a Bachelor of Arts degree, later promoted to a Master of Arts degree per tradition. He also studied at the University of Television and Film in Munich, receiving a diploma in Film Directing.

== Family ==
The younger son of Leo-Ferdinand Henckel von Donnersmarck, a former president of the German division of the Order of Malta, and literary scout Countess Anna Maria von Berg, Henckel von Donnersmarck holds German and Austrian citizenships. His father's only brother, Gregor Henckel von Donnersmarck, was the emeritus abbot at Heiligenkreuz Abbey, a Cistercian monastery in the Vienna Woods where Henckel von Donnersmarck spent a month writing the first draft of The Lives of Others (German: Das Leben der Anderen). His grandfather, Count Friedrich-Carl Henckel von Donnersmarck, was a Thomist philosopher. He is a distant relative of the German filmmaker Anna Henckel-Donnersmarck.

Henckel von Donnersmarck is married to Christiane Asschenfeldt, the first International Executive Director of Creative Commons. They have three children, including Lara Cosima Henckel von Donnersmarck, and currently live in Los Angeles. He stands 2.05 m (6 ft 9 in) tall.

== Career ==
In 1977 (aged 4 or 5), while living as a child in New York, he saw his first movie at the Museum of Modern Art. He expected to see Doctor Dolittle but was "exposed instead to" the German melodrama Varieté. He cites this experience as the start of his interest in film.

In 1996, he won a directing apprenticeship with Richard Attenborough on In Love and War, and then went to study at the Fiction Directing Class of the Hochschule für Fernsehen und Film München (University of Television and Film Munich), Germany, alma mater of directors as diverse as Wim Wenders, Roland Emmerich and Maren Ade, who was Donnersmarck's classmate. His first short film, Dobermann (which he wrote, produced, directed and edited), broke the school record for the number of awards won by a student production. It became an international festival sensation, and Donnersmarck traveled the festival circuit for over a year.

His first feature film Das Leben der Anderen (The Lives of Others), which Donnersmarck spent three years writing, directing and completing, won the European Film Award for Best Film, Best Actor and Best Screenplay in 2006. Donnersmarck won the Los Angeles Film Critics Association's award for Best Foreign Film, was nominated for the Golden Globe (which went to Clint Eastwood instead), and on 25 February 2007 won the Academy Award for Best International Feature Film. In 2007, Donnersmarck was one of 115 new members to be invited to join AMPAS.

His next film, The Tourist, was released in 2010. Donnersmarck re-wrote, directed and completed his sophomore work in under eleven months, telling Charlie Rose he had wanted a break from writing a dark screenplay about suicide. The Tourist was a thriller starring Angelina Jolie and Johnny Depp, and was nominated for three Golden Globes: Best Musical or Comedy, Depp for Actor Musical or Comedy and Jolie for Actress Musical or Comedy. It also won three Teen Choice Awards nominations (Best Picture, Best Actor, Best Actress) of which it won two. The film opened to middling number, but eventually ended up grossing US$278.3 million at the worldwide box office, prompting The Hollywood Reporter belatedly to proclaim it an "international hit".

In 2019, his third feature film Never Look Away was nominated for the Golden Lion at the 75th Venice International Film Festival, for a Golden Globe by the Hollywood Foreign Press Association and for two Oscars in the Best International Feature Film and Best Cinematography categories at the 91st Academy Awards. This was only the second time in history that a German language film by a German director was nominated for an Oscar in multiple categories, the other film being Wolfgang Petersen's Das Boot 36 years prior. It became one of less than two dozen German language features since the end of World War II to surpass one million dollars at the North American box office. Donnersmarck and Christian Petzold are the only directors to have two films in that list. In most international territories, beginning with the Netherlands, Never Look Away became the most successful German language film since The Lives of Others.

In 2022, he was set to direct the psychological thriller Vent for Alcon Entertainment.

== Filmography ==
Short film

Year	Title	Director	Writer	Producer	Editor	Notes
1997	Mitternacht	Yes	Yes	Yes	Yes	Co-directed with Sebastian Henckel-Donnersmarck
1998	Das Datum	Yes	Yes	Yes	Yes	Co-directed with Sebastian Henckel-Donnersmarck
1999	Dobermann	Yes	Yes	No	Yes	
2002	Der Templer	Yes	No	No	No	Co-directed with Sebastian Henckel-Donnersmarck

Television

Year	Title	Notes
2004	Petits mythes urbains	Episode "Témoin à charge"

Feature film

Year	Title	Director	Writer	Producer
2006	The Lives of Others	Yes	Yes	Co-producer
2010	The Tourist	Yes	Yes	No
2018	Never Look Away	Yes	Yes	Yes

== Influence ==
In a 2010 interview with The Guardian, director Howard Davies named Donnersmarck as the artist he most admired.

René Pollesch wrote a play, L'Affaire Martin!, which poked fun at von Donnersmarck. According to Pollesch, the director's parents attended a performance and came backstage to say they liked it.

After meeting him at the Davos World Economic Forum, Jay Nordlinger, writing for National Review, described Donnersmarck as "one of the most impressive people on the planet".

The Europe List, a largest survey on European culture, named Donnersmarck's The Lives of Others second on a list of the best films in European culture, after Roberto Benigni's Life Is Beautiful and followed by Jean-Pierre Jeunet's Amélie.

Kyle Smith writing for National Review ranked Donnersmarck's Never Look Away as the No. 1 Best Film of the Decade 2010–2019.

In 2023 and 2024, Donnersmarck's daughter Lara Cosima publicly refuted claims that her family had aided the Nazis during World War II.

== Honours ==
- Commander of the Bavarian Order of Merit
- Commander of the North Rhine-Westphalian Order of Merit

== Selected awards and nominations ==
- 2020 – Winner – Grand Prix – Belgian Film Critics Association for Never Look Away
- 2018 – Winner – Audience Award – Leiden Film Festival for Never Look Away
- 2018 – Winner – Leoncino d'Oro for Best Picture – Venice Film Festival for Never Look Away
- 2018 – Winner – Young Cinema Award for Best Picture – Venice Film Festival for Never Look Away
- 2013 – Named Young Global Leader by the Davos World Economic Forum
- 2011 – 2 Teen Choice Award wins for The Tourist
- 2011 – 3 Teen Choice Award nominations for The Tourist
- 2011 – 3 Golden Globe nominations for The Tourist
- 2009 – Dante Alighieri Society Gold Medal of Merit
- 2008 – 4 BAFTA nominations for The Lives of Others
- 2008 – César Award for The Lives of Others
- 2007 – New York Film Critics Circle Award for The Lives of Others
- 2006 – 2 European Film Awards for The Lives of Others
  - Best Film
  - Best Screenplay
- 2006 – Deutscher Filmpreis (German Film Award) for The Lives of Others
  - Best Direction
  - Best Screenplay
- 2006 – Screenwriter Award within the Cologne Conference
- 2003 – Friedrich Wilhelm Murnau Foundation Award for Best Short Film for The Crusader
- 2002 – Eastman Award at the Hof International Film Festival for The Crusader (shared with Sebastian Henckel von Donnersmarck)
