= Groma Büromaschinen =

German typewriter manufacturer

Groma Büromaschinen (founded 1872 as Maschinenfabrik G. F. Grosser) was a German manufacturer of typewriters. "Groma" was portmanteau from Grosser and Markersdorf, a neighborhood of Chemnitz.

Groma is best known today for the Kolibri, an ultra-flat portable typewriter, but it also made mid-sized and large typewriters. After World War II, it was a Volkseigener Betrieb.

The last remains of the machine plant were demolished in 2009.
