= Michael Haneke =

German-born Austrian filmmaker (born 1942)

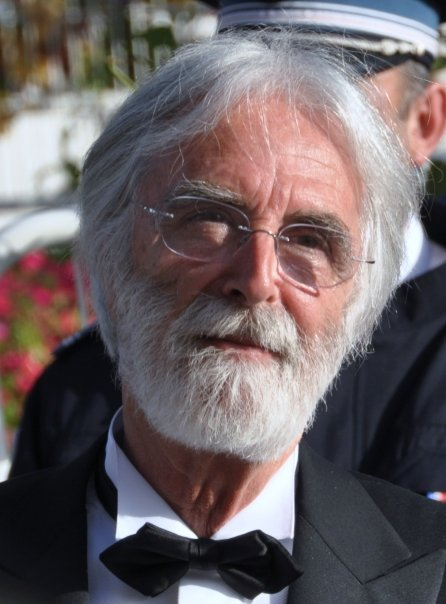
- Haneke in 2009
- Born: 23 March 1942 (age 84); Munich, Germany
- Education: University of Vienna
- Occupations: Film director, screenwriter
- Years active: 1974–2017
- Spouse: Susanne Haneke (m. 1983)
- Children: 1

Michael Haneke (German: [ˈhaːnəkə]; born 23 March 1942) is a German-born Austrian retired film director and screenwriter. His work often examines social issues and depicts the feelings of estrangement experienced by individuals in modern society. Haneke has made films in French, German, and English and has worked in television and theatre. He also teaches film directing at the Film Academy Vienna.

Haneke's first films were a trilogy, consisting of The Seventh Continent (1989), Benny's Video (1992), and 71 Fragments of a Chronology of Chance (1994), each of which depict a "coldly bureaucratic society in which genuine human relationships have been supplanted by a deep-seated collective malaise" and explore "the relationship among consumerism, violence, mass media, and contemporary alienation". He went on to win the Cannes Film Festival's Grand Prix for The Piano Teacher (2001) as well as its Palme d'Or twice, for The White Ribbon (2009) and Amour (2012), the latter of which received five Academy Award nominations and won the Academy Award for Best Foreign Language Film. He also directed Funny Games (1997) and its 2007 remake, Code Unknown (2000), Time of the Wolf (2003), Caché (2005), and Happy End (2017).

== Early life and education ==
Haneke is the son of German actor and director Fritz Haneke and Austrian actress Beatrix von Degenschild. His stepfather, the composer Alexander Steinbrecher, later married the mother of actor Christoph Waltz. Haneke was raised in the city of Wiener Neustadt, Austria.

Haneke showed a strong interest in literature and music, but as an adolescent developed a "downright contempt for any form of school". During this period of his life, he has later described himself as a "rebel". He had ambitions of becoming an actor in his youth, later abandoning these plans after failing an entrance examination at the Max Reinhardt Seminar in Vienna. He later attended the University of Vienna to study philosophy, psychology and drama. Not a committed student, he would spend most of his time attending local movie theatres. After leaving university, he began working odd jobs, before working as an editor and dramaturge at the southwestern German television station Südwestfunk from 1967 to 1970, a time during which he also worked as a film critic. He made his debut as a television director in 1974.

== Career ==
=== 1974–1988: Early work in television ===
Haneke started his career directing numerous television projects. He made his debut as a writer and director with the 1974 television movie After Liverpool starring Hildegard Schmahl and Dieter Kirchlechner. The project originally started as a radio play. He then directed two more television films, Three Paths to the Lake (1976), about a war photo journalist who faces a moral crisis when she is forced to examine the implications of her work, and another telefilm Sperrmüll (1976). In 1979 he directed two episodes of Lemminge followed by Variation – oder Daß es Utopien gibt, weiß ich selber! (1983). In 1986 he directed Fraulein: A German Melodrama which was described as Haneke's answer to Fassbinder's The Marriage of Maria Braun. Haneke wanted to make a film about German history that doesn't drown in self-pity and yet still attracts the public". A few years later he would make the experimental tele-documentary film Nachruf für einen Mörder about a young Austrian who provoked a hideous bloodbath in Vienna.

=== 1989–1997: Rise to prominence ===
Haneke's feature film debut was 1989's The Seventh Continent, which served to trace out the violent and bold style that would bloom in later years. The film chronicles the last years of an Austrian family played by Birgit Doll and Dieter Berner. Peter Bradshaw of The Guardian described the film as a "masterpiece". Despite being shortlisted for the Academy Award for Best Foreign Language Film it wasn't nominated. Three years later he directed the controversial psychological horror film Benny's Video (1992). The film premiered at the 1992 Cannes Film Festival to positive reviews. It later won the FIPRESCI Award at the European Film Awards. The film showed at the New York Film Festival where Stephen Holden of The New York Times praised the performances and Haneke writing, "The film makes strong, if heavy-handed, points about the confusing effects of television violence". His third film in the trilogy is entitled, 71 Fragments of a Chronology of Chance (1994), Manohla Dargis's The New York Times called it an "icy-cool study of violence both mediated and horribly real", adding "For Mr. Haneke, the point seems less that evil is commonplace than that we don't engage with it as thinking, actively moral beings. We slurp our soup while Sarajevo burns on the boob tube."

In 1997 he directed the television film The Castle (1997). The project is based on the Franz Kafka's novel of the same name. The film starred Ulrich Mühe and Susanne Lothar. It premiered at the Berlin International Film Festival. Also that year he directed the feature film Funny Games (1997). The plot involves two young men who hold a family hostage and torture them with sadistic games in their vacation home. The film premiered at the 1997 Cannes Film Festival. David Rooney of Variety wrote about his continuation of the examination of violence writing, "Haneke is clearly more interested in the implications of violence than the acts themselves, and the psychological wallop they pack is strengthened by having most of the physical and emotional carnage played off-camera".

=== 2000–2009: Breakthrough and acclaim ===
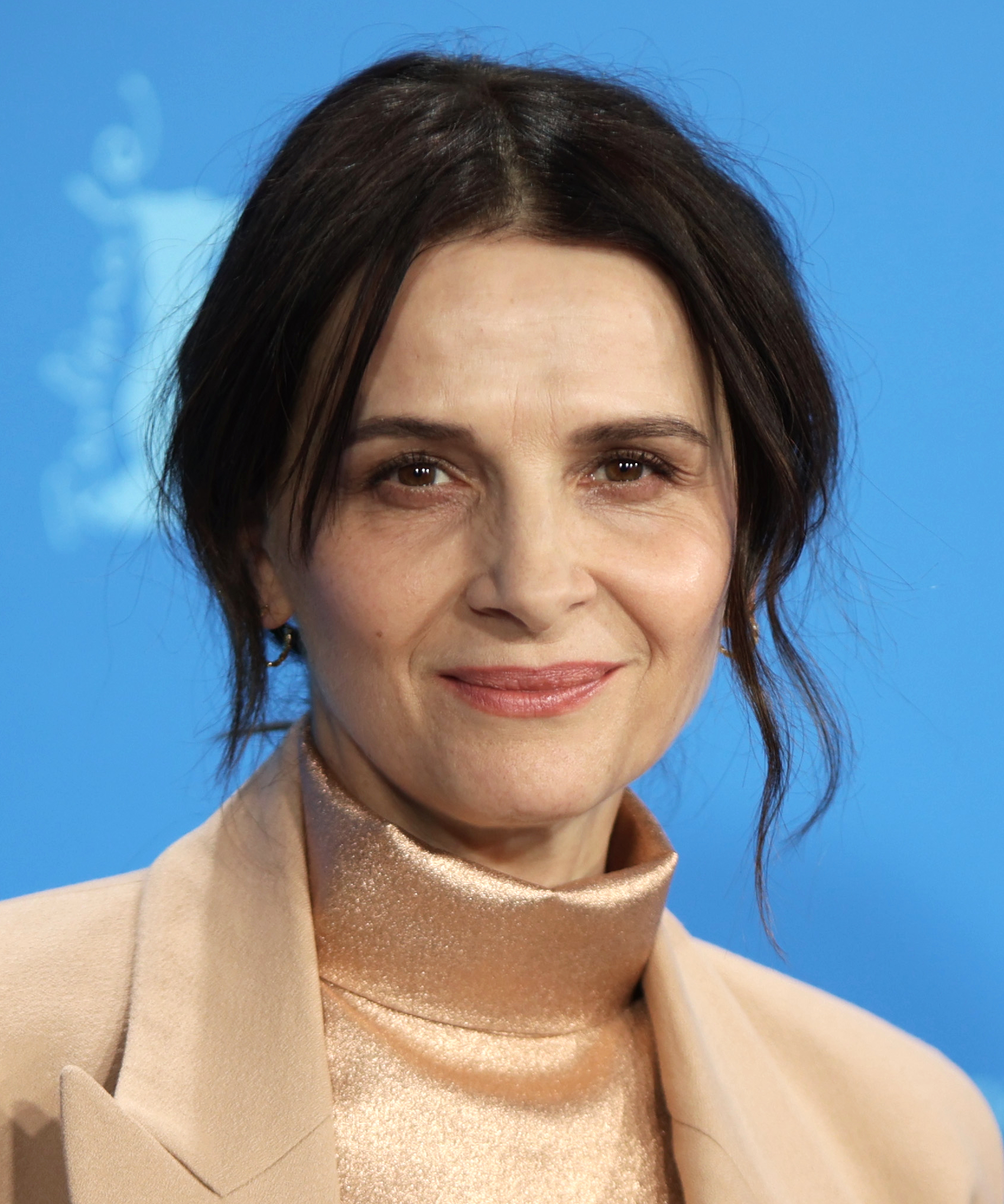
Juliette Binoche acted in Haneke's Code Unknown (2000) and Caché (2005)

He directed the French film Code Unknown (2000) starring Juliette Binoche. The film revolves around separate storylines which weave and intersect with each other. The film is inspired by the life of the French novelist and war reporter Olivier Weber. The film screened at the 2000 Cannes Film Festival. The New York Times praised Haneke "as a skillful, minutely observant filmmaker who trusts his audience to be able to put two and two together" but adds "Unfortunately, he's often too cryptic, which leaves viewers still trying to make connections when they should already be reacting to the moral lessons implied by them." Haneke has directed a number of stage productions in German, which include works by Strindberg, Goethe, and Heinrich von Kleist in Berlin, Munich and Vienna.

Haneke achieved great success with the critically acclaimed French film The Piano Teacher (2001). The film starred Isabelle Huppert as a sexually repressed piano teacher who soon becomes involved with a younger man. The film tackles subjects such as masochism, rape, incest, sexual repression, sexual violence, and the relationships between men and women. It premiered at the 2001 Cannes Film Festival where it received rapturous reviews. It won the prestigious Grand Prize at the festival and also won its stars, Benoît Magimel and Huppert the Best Actor and Actress awards. David Denby of The New Yorker wrote, "Haneke avoids the sensationalism of movie shockers, even high-class shockers like Hitchcock's Psycho and Polanski's Repulsion. There are no expressionist moments in The Piano Teacher—no scenes of longing, no soft-focus dreams or cinematic dreck". Denby concluded, "[the film] is a seriously scandalous work, beautifully made, and it deserves a sizable audience that might argue over it, appreciate it—even hate it."

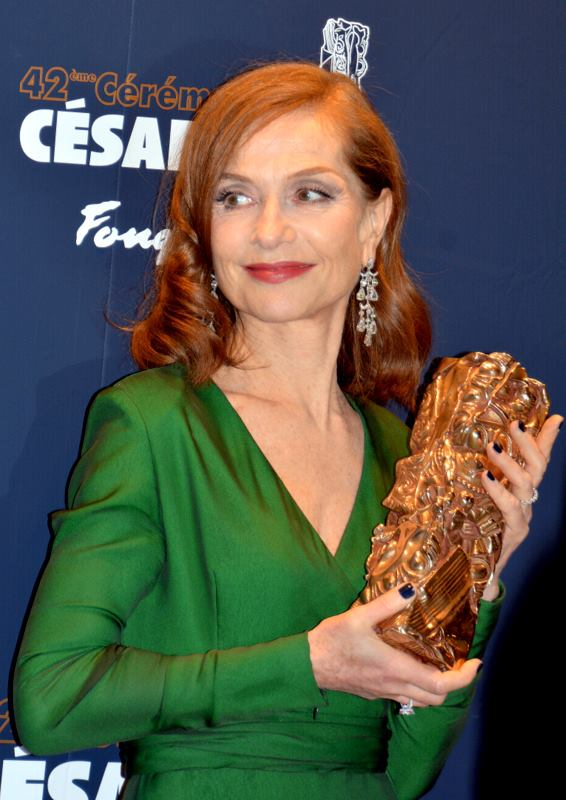
Isabelle Huppert has acted in four of Haneke's films, including The Piano Teacher.

A few years later he directed the dystopian drama Time of the Wolf (2003) starring Huppert. The film revolves around a family trying to find their way after a global cataclysm. The film received positive reviews with Scott Foundas of Variety Magazine writing, "Haneke demonstrates profound insight into the essence of human behavior when all humility is pared away, raw panic and despair are the order of the day, and man becomes more like wolf than man." In 2005 Haneke reunited with Juliette Binoche in the psychological thriller Caché after she expressed interest in working with him. The film opened the 2005 Cannes Film Festival to positive reviews. The film involves themes of collective guilt, collective memory and colonialism. He incorporated stories of the Paris massacre of 1961 into the film. Haneke won the Cannes Film Festival Award for Best Director for the film. It was also included in the BBC's 100 Greatest Films of the 21st Century. Haneke frequently worked with real-life couple Ulrich Mühe and Susanne Lothar – thrice each.

In 2006 he gave his debut as an opera director, staging Mozart's Don Giovanni for the Opéra National de Paris at Palais Garnier when the theater's general manager was Gerard Mortier. With his next film The White Ribbon (2009) Haneke chose to shoot in black-and-white and in Germany. The film is set in 1913 and deals with strange incidents in a small town in Northern Germany, depicting an authoritarian, fascist-like atmosphere, where children are subjected to rigid rules and suffer harsh punishments, and where strange deaths occur. The film premiered at the 2009 Cannes Film Festival and won his first Palme d'Or. It later won the Golden Globe Award for Best Foreign Language Film and earned two Academy Award nominations for Best International Feature Film and Best Cinematography losing to The Secret in Their Eyes (2009) from Argentina and Avatar (2009). Critic Roger Ebert described the film as "visual[ly] masterful" adding, "His films are like parables, teaching that bad things sometimes happen simply because they...happen. The universe laughs at man's laws and does what it will."

=== 2012–present: Final works and retirement ===
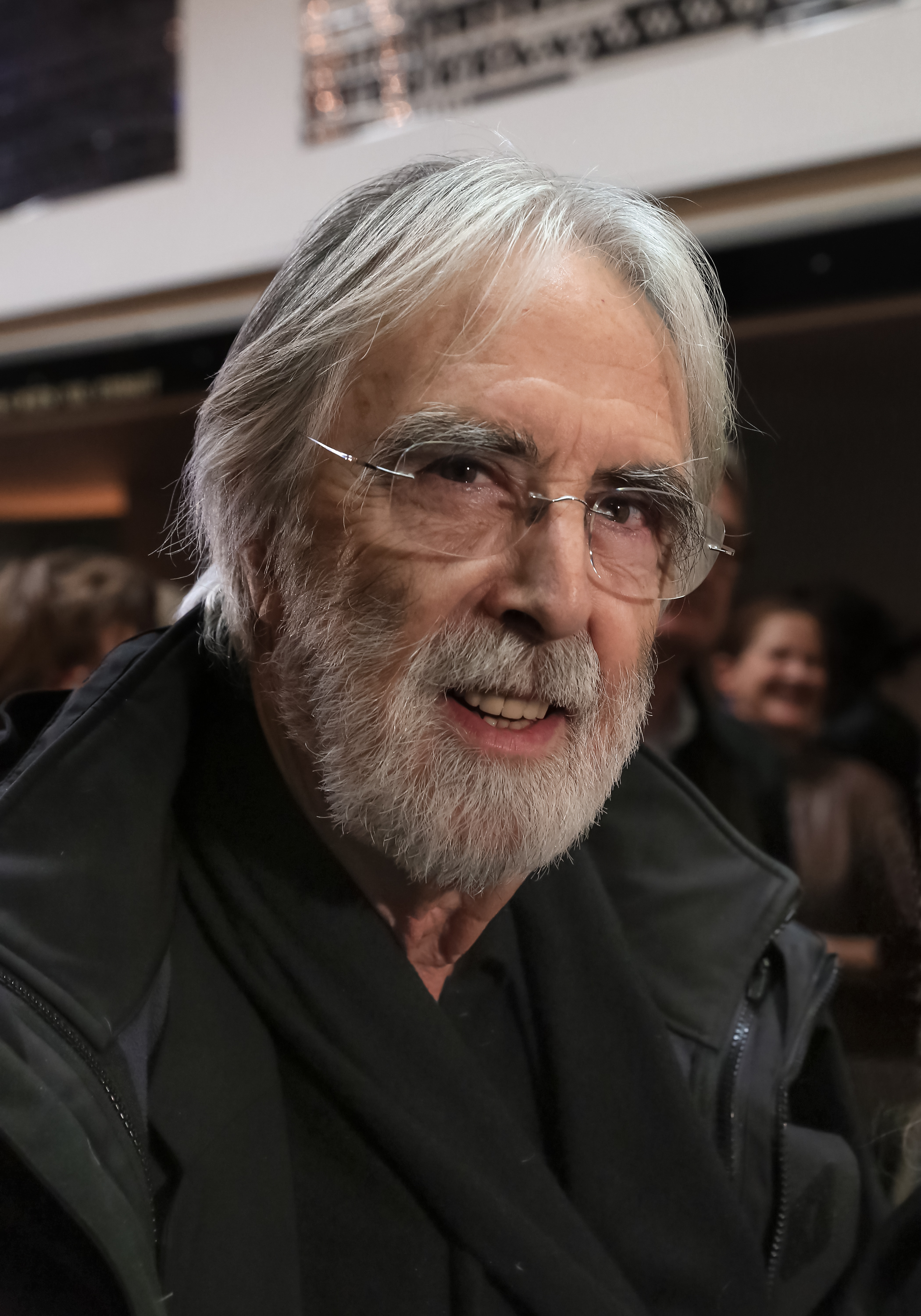
Haneke in 2014

In 2012, Haneke directed Amour starring Jean-Louis Trintignant, Emmanuelle Riva and Isabelle Huppert. The film revolves around an elderly couple aging together. The film premiered at the 2012 Cannes Film Festival and received the Palme d'Or, Haneke's second. Ella Tayor of NPR praised the film describing it as "Touching and tragic" adding "Haneke implicates us in the full range of human capacity". The film also earned the Academy Award for Best Foreign Language Film with Haneke earning Academy Award nominations for Best Director and Best Original Screenplay, the later nominations being the first of his career.

In 2012, he was to direct Così fan tutte for the New York City Opera. This production had originally been commissioned by Jürgen Flimm for the Salzburg Festival 2009, but Haneke had to resign due to an illness preventing him from preparing the work. Haneke realized this production at Madrid's Teatro Real in 2013. In 2013, he was the subject of the documentary film Michael H – Profession: Director. That year, Haneke won the Prince of Asturias Award for the arts.

In 2017, for his twelfth film, Happy End Haneke reunited with Trintignant and Huppert. The film also starred Mathieu Kassovitz and Toby Jones. The film centers around a bourgeois French family dealing with a series of setbacks and crises. The film was nominated for the Palme d'Or at the 70th Cannes Film Festival. The film received respectable reviews. Alissa Wilkinson of Vox described it as a commentary on "the European refugee crisis and the pitfalls of privilege". Wilkinson added, " challenges its audience to pay attention to put together the story, then, is as much an aesthetic statement about how to watch a movie as a political one. We have to observe and see what's in the background. And that's just what the family at the center of the movie doesn't do, and what makes them civilized monsters — a proclivity they pass on through generations."

Haneke says that films should offer viewers more space for imagination and self-reflection. Films that have too much detail and moral clarity, Haneke says, are used for mindless consumption by their viewers. Haneke teaches film direction at the Film Academy Vienna. One of his students there was director Katharina Mückstein.

In August 2026, his fellow Austrian filmmaker, friend and collaborator Markus Schleinzer, while promoting his film Rose (2026), shared that Haneke had retired.

== Style and reception ==
Haneke is known for directing films which are often unsentimental and uses disturbing imagery to explore social critiques on issues such as class, race, gender, and violence. The Museum of Modern Art showcased his films in 2007 adding that they feature themes "of alienation and social collapse; the exploitation and consumption of violence; the bourgeois family as the incubator of fascistic impulse; individual responsibility and collective guilt; and the ethics of the photographic image". He is also known for his use of the long take rather than relying on quick edits or fast-paced editing. Haneke prefers to let his scenes unfold slowly, allowing the audience to fully experience the tension and emotion of each moment. This creates a sense of intimacy for the audience to draw them into a scene. He also uses static shots, ambiguous endings, meta-narratives, and silence. He frequently uses "Anne" and "Georges" as character names.

Haneke has collaborated with Isabelle Huppert and Juliette Binoche on numerous films.

== Favourite films ==
In 2012, Haneke participated in the Sight & Sound poll and submitted these films as his favorite.

- Au hasard Balthazar by Robert Bresson (France, 1966)
- Lancelot du Lac by Robert Bresson (France, 1974)
- Mirror by Andrei Tarkovsky (USSR, 1975)
- Salo, or the 120 Days of Sodom by Pier Paolo Pasolini (Italy, 1975)
- The Exterminating Angel by Luis Buñuel (Mexico, 1962)
- The Gold Rush by Charlie Chaplin (USA, 1925)
- Psycho by Alfred Hitchcock (USA, 1960)
- A Woman Under the Influence by John Cassavetes (USA, 1974)
- Germany Year Zero by Roberto Rossellini (Italy, 1948)
- L'Eclisse by Michelangelo Antonioni (Italy, 1962)

In June 2024, Haneke's list of all-time favorite films was published on LaCinetek. He lists more than 100 films, quoting several works by directors Ingmar Bergman (Persona, Through a Glass Darkly, Winter Light, The Silence, Scenes from a Marriage) and Abbas Kiarostami (Where Is the Friend's House?, Through the Olive Trees, And Life Goes On, Taste of Cherry, The Wind Will Carry Us).

== Filmography ==
=== Feature films ===
Year	English title	Original title	Credited as		Reception	
Year	English title	Original title	Director	Writer	Rotten Tomatoes	Metacritic
1989	The Seventh Continent	Der siebente Kontinent	Yes	Yes	69% (7 reviews)	89 (7 reviews)
1992	Benny's Video		Yes	Yes	64% (11 reviews)	60 (9 reviews)
1994	71 Fragments of a Chronology of Chance	71 Fragmente einer Chronologie des Zufalls	Yes	Yes	67% (5 reviews)	71 (8 reviews)
1997	Funny Games		Yes	Yes	73% (40 reviews)	69 (10 reviews)
2000	Code Unknown	Code inconnu: Récit incomplet de divers voyages	Yes	Yes	75% (51 reviews)	74 (13 reviews)
2001	The Piano Teacher	La Pianiste	Yes	Yes	73% (89 reviews)	79 (26 reviews)
2003	Time of the Wolf	Le temps du loup	Yes	Yes	67% (54 reviews)	71 (20 reviews)
2005	Caché		Yes	Yes	89% (135 reviews)	84 (37 reviews)
2007	Funny Games		Yes	Yes	52% (144 reviews)	44 (33 reviews)
2009	The White Ribbon	Das Weiße Band - Eine Deutsche Kindergeschichte	Yes	Yes	86% (147 reviews)	82 (33 reviews)
2012	Amour		Yes	Yes	93% (227 reviews)	95 (45 reviews)
2017	Happy End		Yes	Yes	70% (155 reviews)	72 (30 reviews)

=== Television ===
Year	Title	Credited as		Notes
Year	Title	Director	Writer	Notes
1974	After Liverpool	Yes	Yes	TV movie
1976	Three Paths to the Lake	Yes	Yes	TV movie
1976	Sperrmüll	Yes	Yes	TV movie
1979	Lemminge	Yes	Yes	TV mini series; 2 episodes
1983	Variation – oder Daß es Utopien gibt, weiß ich selber!	Yes	Yes	TV movie
1984	Who Was Edgar Allan?	Yes	Yes	TV movie
1986	Fraulein – Ein deutsches Melodram	Yes	Yes	TV movie
1991	Nachruf für einen Mörder	Yes	Yes	TV movie documentary
1993	Die Rebellion	Yes	Yes	TV movie
1997	The Castle	Yes	Yes	TV movie
2013	Così Fan Tutte	Yes	No	TV movie

=== Short films ===
- Lumière and Company (1995) (segment "Michael Haneke/Vienne")

== Awards and nominations ==
His directorial debut, The Seventh Continent, won the Bronze Leopard at the Locarno International Film Festival in 1989. He later won the Grand Prix at the 2001 Cannes Film Festival for The Piano Teacher and the Best Director Award for Caché at the 2005 Cannes Film Festival. He subsequently directed the 2007 remake of his controversial 1997 film Funny Games.

At the 2009 Cannes Film Festival, his film The White Ribbon won the Palme d'Or, and at the 67th Golden Globe Awards the film won the Golden Globe Award for Best Foreign Language Film. In 2012, his film Amour premiered and competed at the 2012 Cannes Film Festival. The film would go on to win the Palme d'Or, making it his second win of the prestigious award in three years; this made him the seventh director to have won it twice and the only Austrian director to have accomplished this. The film received five Academy Award nominations, including Best Picture, Best Director, Best Original Screenplay, and Best Actress in a Leading Role for Emmanuelle Riva; it won in the category of Best Foreign Language Film.

In 2013, Haneke won the Prince of Asturias Award for the arts. His twelfth and most recent film, Happy End, was nominated for the Palme d'Or at the 2017 Cannes Film Festival.

== Bibliography ==
- Brunette, Peter (15 February 2010). Michael Haneke. University of Illinois Press. ISBN 978-0-252-09066-0.
- McCann, Ben; Sorfa, David (20 August 2013). The Cinema of Michael Haneke: Europe Utopia. Columbia University Press. ISBN 978-0-231-50465-2.
- Grundmann, Roy (4 February 2010). A Companion to Michael Haneke. John Wiley & Sons. ISBN 978-1-4443-2061-9.
- Price, Brian; Rhodes, John David (2010). On Michael Haneke. Wayne State University Press. ISBN 0-8143-3405-9.
- Wheatley, Catherine (15 August 2013). Michael Haneke's Cinema: The Ethic of the Image. Berghahn Books. ISBN 978-0-85745-546-8.
- Michael Haneke. Special Issue of Modern Austrian Literature. 43.2, 2010.
- Alexander D. Ornella / Stefanie Knauss (ed.): Fascinatingly Disturbing. Interdisciplinary Perspectives on Michael Haneke's Cinema, Eugene, Pickwick, 2010, ISBN 978-1-606-08624-7.
- Fatima Naqvi, Trügerische Vertrautheit: Filme von Michael Haneke/ Deceptive Familiarity: Films by Michael Haneke, Synema, Wien, 2010.
- Grundmann, Roy, Fatima Naqvi, and Colin Root. Michael Haneke: Interviews. University Press of Mississippi, Jackson, 2020.
