= Neudeck =

Neudeck may refer to:

- the former estate of Paul von Hindenburg, today Ogrodzieniec, Warmian-Masurian Voivodeship, a village in northern Poland
- the former estate Neudeck Palace of Guido Henckel von Donnersmarck (1830–1916), today in Świerklaniec in Upper Silesia
- Neudeck in the suburbs of Munich

== People ==
- Rupert Neudeck, German humanitarian
- Ruth Neudeck, German SS supervisor at death camps and war criminal
