= Cleopatra and Caesar (painting) =

Painting by Jean-Léon Gérôme

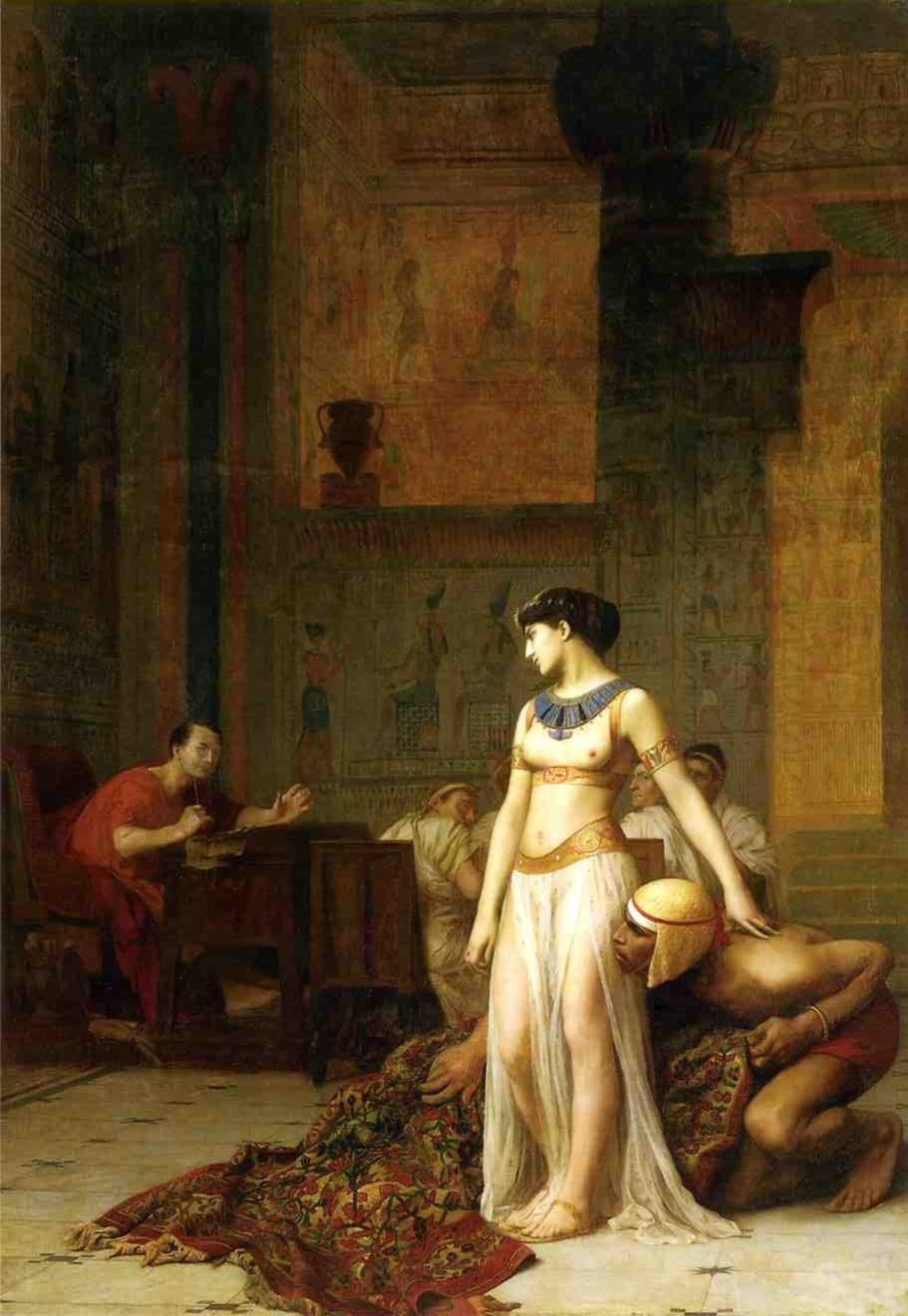
- Artist: Jean-Léon Gérôme
- Year: 1866
- Medium: Oil on canvas
- Dimensions: 183 cm × 129.5 cm (72 in × 51.0 in)
- Location: Private collection

Cleopatra and Caesar (French: Cléopâtre et César), also known as Cleopatra Before Caesar, is an oil-on-canvas painting by the French Academic artist Jean-Léon Gérôme, completed in 1866. The work was originally commissioned by the French courtesan La Païva, but she was unhappy with the finished painting and returned it to Gérôme. It was exhibited at the Salon of 1866 and the Royal Academy of Arts in 1871.

Gérôme's painting is one of the earliest modern depictions of Cleopatra emerging from a carpet in the presence of Julius Caesar, a minor historical inaccuracy that arose out of the translation of a scene from Plutarch's Life of Caesar and the semantic change of the word "carpet" over time. The work is considered a classic example of Egyptomania and was mass-produced by Goupil, allowing it to reach a wide audience.

The painting was held by California banker Darius Ogden Mills and remained in the Mills family art collection for over a century until it was sold to a private collector in 1990.

== Background ==
Jean-Léon Gérôme (1824–1904) was a nineteenth century French painter and sculptor. At the age of twenty-three, he came to the attention of the art world at the Salon of 1847 with The Cock Fight (1846), a Neo-Grec painting that was praised by Théophile Gautier. With works informed by his frequent travels throughout the Middle East and visits to Egypt, Gérôme specialized in historical and Orientalist painting and became known as a leader of the Academic art movement. According to historian Charles Sowerwine, Gérôme

painted erotic subjects with a photographic approach and sensual charge, but avoided 'indecency' by the use of Oriental and historical contexts . . . To us, Gérôme's nudes seem pornographic, but to contemporaries they were idealized by their removal from contemporary society and their insertion in the Oriental context.

French writer Prosper Mérimée first proposed the subject of Cleopatra and Caesar in a letter sent to Gérôme in December 1860. La Païva, a wealthy French courtesan, later commissioned the painting from Gérôme, intending it for display in the Hôtel de la Païva, her mansion on the Champs-Élysées. According to American art critic Earl Shinn, the work was originally painted on silk and was designed as a "transparency to be lowered or raised midway of a long saloon" in La Païva's mansion, "which it was desirable to divide occasionally into two".

== Development ==
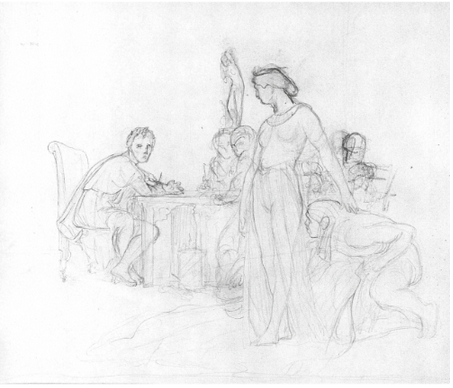
Pencil study in preparation for the painting

Gérôme made at least two previous oil paintings and a number of sketches in preparation for the work. One shows Cleopatra lying on the ground stretching out to Julius Caesar with Apollodorus crouching behind her. In one variation before the finished version, Caesar is shown by himself with his hands on the desk (instead of outstretched) without his four secretaries. When the work was finished in 1866, Cleopatra's position changed to show her standing before Caesar with Apollodorus bent down beside her.

Gérôme painted the scene based on the meeting between Cleopatra and Caesar written in the Life of Caesar by Greek historian Plutarch (c. AD 46 – AD 120) more than a century after the incident took place. Even though Gérôme visited Egypt in 1857, where George W. Whiting of Rice University notes "he acquired numerous abundant local color and exact detail" that informed the painting of Cleopatra and Caesar, the Egyptian background setting in the work is derived from a plate in a volume from the Description de l'Égypte (1809–29) that depicts a temple at Deir el-Medina.

== Completion and exhibition ==
La Païva disliked the finished painting she had commissioned and returned it to Gérôme. Ackerman notes that La Païva felt the work was too expensive. Gérôme modified the painting by adding canvas to the back for strength, and it was subsequently purchased by his father-in-law, Adolphe Goupil (1806–1893) of Goupil & Cie, the leading art dealership in nineteenth-century France. Gérôme first met Goupil in 1859 and married his daughter Marie several years later. Cleopatra and Caesar was one of three works Gérôme presented at the Salon of 1866 where it was exhibited with the title César et Cléopâtre. The painting appeared at the Royal Academy of Arts exhibition in 1871 under the longer name Cléopâtre apportée à César dans un tapis (Cleopatra brought to Caesar in a carpet).

== Description ==
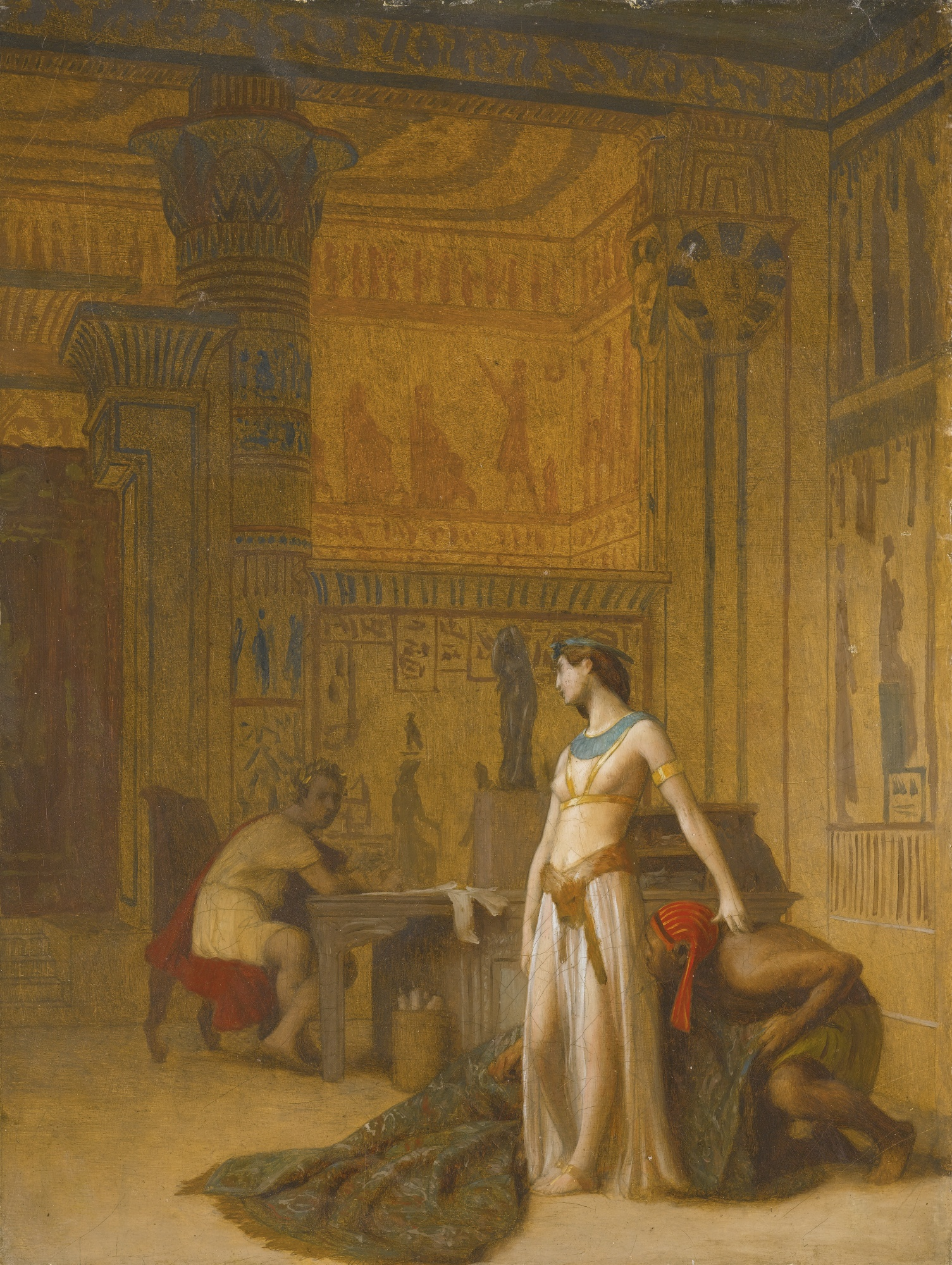
One of two alternate versions

The painting depicts the year 47 BC, when Cleopatra stands before Julius Caesar after Apollodorus, her servant, has just finished smuggling her into the palace inside a rug. The figures are shown approximately half life-size. Since the 1866 exhibition, the work has become known by other titles, such as Cleopatra Before Caesar, and more recently, Cleopatra and Caesar.

== Critical reception ==
The American Egyptomania project at George Mason University describes the painting as a classic example of Egyptomania, containing "sex, slavery, nudity, and decadence". Lucy H. Hooper called it a companion piece to Gérôme's earlier work, Phryne before the Areopagus (1861). The painting was one of two notable depictions of Cleopatra from the nineteenth century along with Cleopatra and the Peasant (1838) by Eugène Delacroix.

== Historical inaccuracy ==
A translation of Plutarch's Life of Caesar by John Langhorne and his brother William published in 1770 was the first source to use the word "carpet" to describe the material used by Cleopatra's servant to sneak her into the palace. Although the original meaning used by Plutarch was more akin to what is today known as a duffel bag, at the time of Langhorne's translation a carpet meant a type of "thick fabric", not an actual rug. But by the nineteenth century, semantic change led to the word taking on a different meaning. The legend of Cleopatra hiding in a rug, although historically inaccurate, became the most popular image, with Gérôme one of the first to popularize it in modern art.

== Influence ==
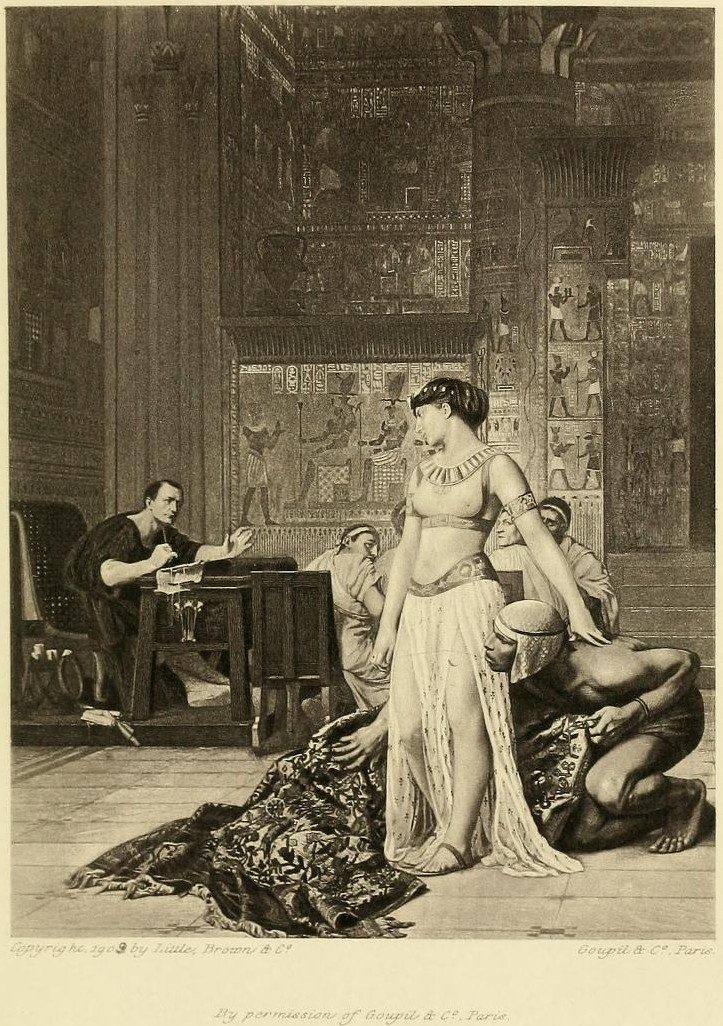
A Goupil illustration (1909)

Gérôme's professional relationship with art collector Adolphe Goupil allowed his paintings to become mass-produced in the form of engravings and photographs, reaching more people and impacting the wider culture throughout Britain and the United States. Over time, both theatrical and Hollywood productions about Cleopatra looked to Gérôme's painting for inspiration. (Note: Not just theatre and film but also art. Dream of the Shulamite (1934), an oil on canvas by American painter R. H. Ives Gammell, is said to show the influence of Gérôme's Cleopatra and Caesar, in both its idea and composition. See Ackerman, Gerald M. and Elizabeth Ives Hunter (2001). Transcending Vision: R. H. Ives Gammell 1893–1981. R.H. Ives Gammell Studios Trust. p. 104. OCLC 47012809.) Whiting argues that Gérôme's work may have influenced Irish playwright George Bernard Shaw's play Caesar and Cleopatra (1898), particularly the carpet scene in Act III. Many of Gérôme's history paintings influenced the composition of cinematic scenes portraying ancient history.

== Provenance ==
The painting was bought by California banker, philanthropist, and New York real estate developer Darius Ogden Mills in the 1870s and remained in the Mills family art collection until it was sold to a private collector in 1990.
