= Hôtel de la Païva =

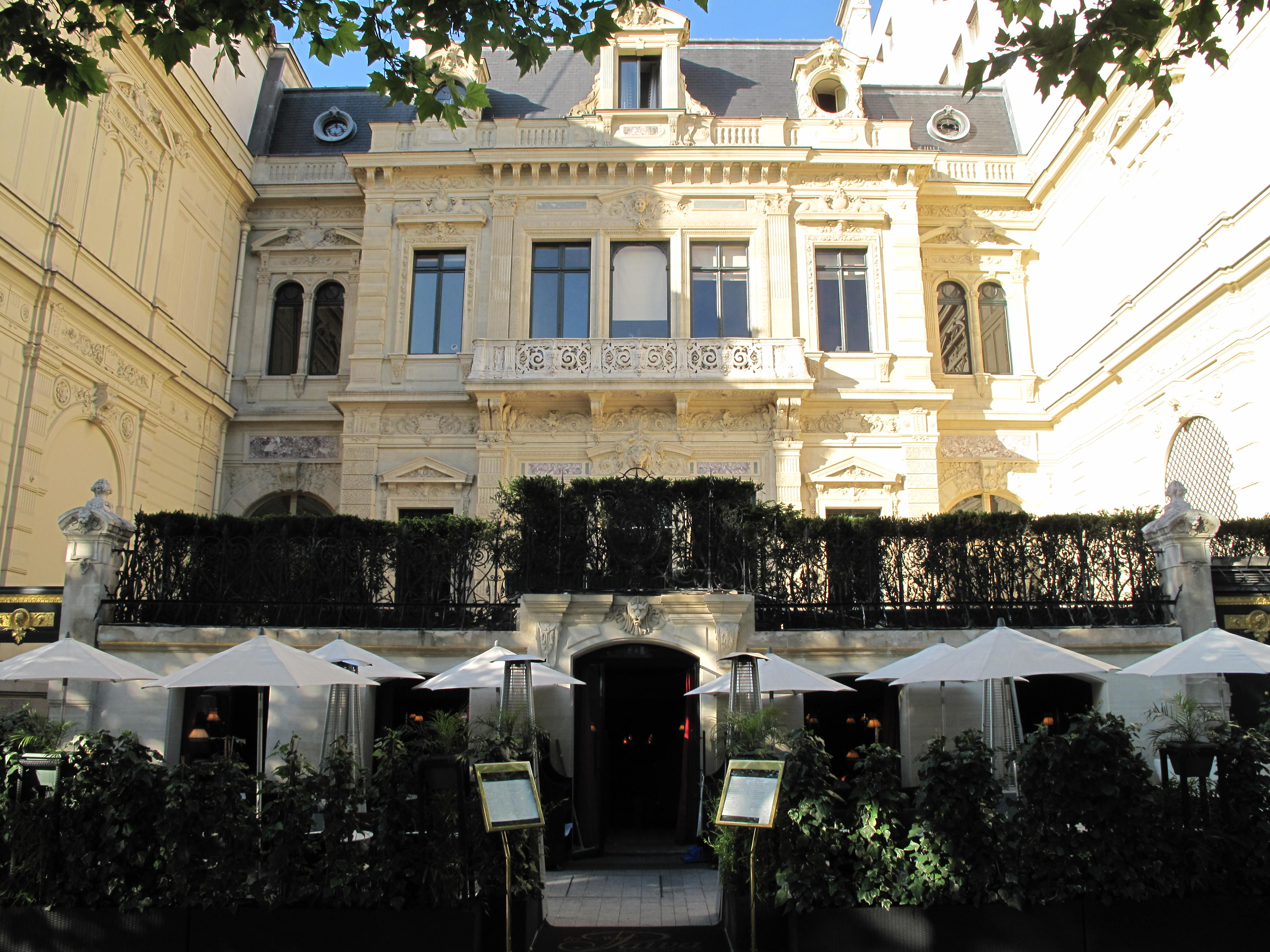
- Main façade on the Champs-Élysées

General information
- Type: Hôtel particulier
- Architectural style: Italian Renaissance
- Location: 25 Avenue des Champs-Élysées, Paris, France
- Current tenants: The Travellers Club
- Construction started: 1856
- Completed: 1866
- Client: Esther Lachmann, known as La Païva

Design and construction
- Architect: Pierre Manguin

The Hôtel de la Païva (French pronunciation: [otɛl d(ə) la paiva]) is an hôtel particulier, a type of large townhouse in France, which was built between 1856 and 1866, at 25 Avenue des Champs-Élysées by the courtesan Esther Lachmann, better known as La Païva (hence its name). She was born in modest circumstances in a Moscow ghetto, to Polish parents. By successive marriages, she became a soi-disant Portuguese marchioness and a Prussian countess, this last marriage supplying the funds for the hôtel, at which she gave fabulous feasts. Since 1904, the house has been used by the Travellers Club of Paris, a gentlemen's club.

== History ==
La Païva had already acquired a luxurious mansion at 28 Place Saint-Georges in Paris but dreamt of building another on the Champs-Élysées, which she thought was the most beautiful avenue in the world. According to legend, in her youth, she had been pushed out of a cab by a hurried customer and slightly injured. She promised herself to build herself a house on the avenue where she fell. After her marriage to Albino Francisco de Araújo de Paiva, the self-styled Portuguese marquis de Païva, she had the funds to do so.

Once the hôtel was built, she received many notable people there, including the Goncourt brothers, Théophile Gautier, Léon Gambetta, Ernest Renan, and Hippolyte Taine. In 1877, suspected of espionage, La Païva and her husband, Prussian multimillionaire Count Guido Henckel von Donnersmarck, whom she had married in 1871, left France and withdrew to Silesia, where she died in 1884.

The double entrance to the courtyard of the hôtel has been preserved: one door was for the entry of cabs and the second for their exit, avoiding the need to turn around. The courtyard has been replaced by commercial establishments: first a financial exchange office, and later a restaurant.

== Building and its furnishings ==
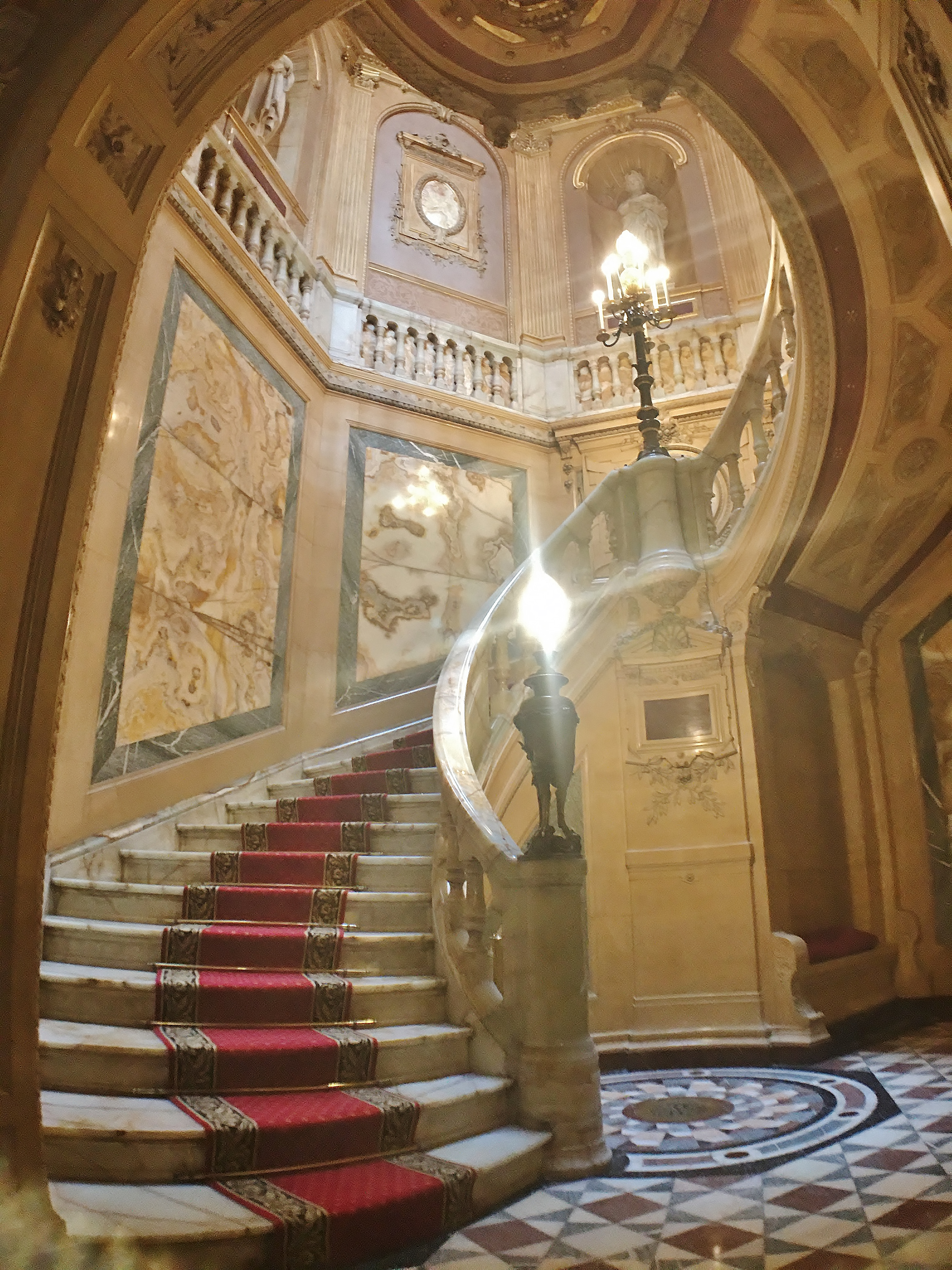
The yellow onyx staircase.

La Païva commissioned architect Pierre Manguin to build the hôtel in Italian Renaissance style. He worked with the sculptors Léon Cugnot, Eugène Delaplanche, Eugène Legrain, Ernest Carrier-Belleuse, and Jules Dalou. There is a Ceiling by Paul Baudry.

During construction of the hôtel, Augustin Scholl said to those who asked about the progress of the work, "The construction is well underway: just ask the sidewalk."

The hôtel is especially famous for its beautiful yellow onyx staircase, probably unique in the world. The stairs inspired the contemporary witticism by the playwright François Ponsard, adapted from Phèdre, "Ainsi que la vertu, le vice a ses degrés", meaning "Like virtue, vice has its degrees". Degrés means both steps in a staircase and levels of a hierarchy.

=== Bath ===
The Napoleon III-style bathtub was sculpted by Donnadieu from a block of yellow onyx (1.85 m - 900 kg). This material, called onyx-marble, was found in a Roman quarry and rediscovered in 1849 near Oran (Algeria) by Delmonte. This type of onyx was used at the time of Napoleon III for the decoration of only the most prestigious buildings. At the Universal Exhibition of 1867, Donnadieu received a distinction for "onyx marbles designed with the elegance which is the supreme attribute of Parisian workers" (from "Algeria to the Universal Exhibition in Paris, 1867" O . McCarthy). La Paîva is said to have taken baths of milk, lime-blossom, and even champagne.

Another tub in silver was equipped with three taps, the third being used for milk or champagne.
