= Szarlej Mine =

Former zinc ore mine in Poland

- Scharley in Oberschlesien, lithograph by Ernst Wilhelm Knippel, depicting the Szarlej mine, mid-19th century
- Founded: 1811
- Defunct: after 1895
- Headquarters: Kingdom of Prussia
- Owner: Hugo Gutmann

Szarlej Mine (Szarley, German: Scharley, Scharlei) was a zinc ore (calamine) mine that operated in the area of present-day Szarlej, a district of Piekary Śląskie in Poland. It was established in 1811 and operated until around 1896. Until the mid-19th century, it was the largest and richest zinc ore mine in Upper Silesia (other significant mines of this type included Neue Helene and Cecylia). It was one of the largest calamine mines in Europe.

== Geology ==
The Szarlej mine exploited a carbonate-hosted lead-zinc ore deposit. The ore-bearing horizons are dolomite, limestones, and silts of Middle Triassic age.

In the geological description of the Szarlej mine by Louis-Édouard Rivot and Lejeune, two layers were identified: white and red. Their distribution, starting from the surface, was as follows:

- a poor white deposit with red ore, 8 to 10 meters thick, transitioning westward into two richer layers separated by dolomite a few meters thick;
- the upper red layer containing red calamine, with a high concentration of silver-bearing minerals such as galena and a mineral containing lead carbonate in its upper parts, with a probable thickness of up to 15 metres (8 fathoms);
- the lower, purer white layer resting on limestone, with a thickness ranging from 0.3 to 1.2 meters; it contained small amounts of white calamine.

The main minerals extracted from the Szarlej mine were primarily white calamine (with a zinc content of up to 23–27%) and red calamine, zinc blende, and dolomite. Smithsonite, pyromorphite, gypsum, and an unusual brownish-red hemimorphite were also found. Calamine, zinc blende, and galena were found in numerous fractures in the dolomite, giving it a brecciated appearance.

Samples of rocks from the Szarlej mine, such as red calamine, white calamine, and dolomite, were exhibited in the Zollverein section at the 1862 International Exhibition in London. Rocks from the Szarlej mine (as well as from nearby mines like Bleischarley and Neue Helene) were displayed at the World's Fair in Vienna in 1873.

=== Chemical composition of calamine from Szarlej ===
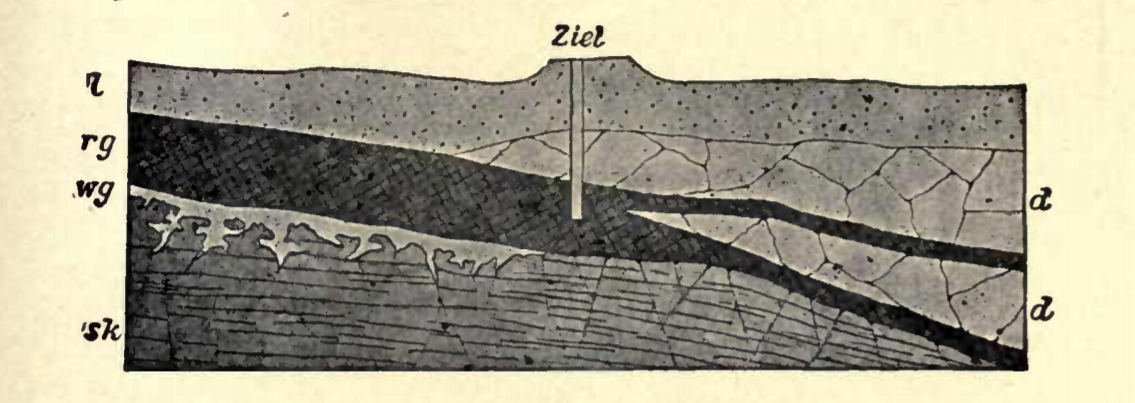
Geological cross-section of Judith and Szarlej zinc ore mines by Ferdinand Roemer. Legend: l: clay, d: dolomite, sk: foundational limestone, wg: white calamine, rg: red calamine.

The chemical analysis of a sample of white calamine from Szarlej, conducted by Karsten before 1827, revealed the following approximate composition:

Substance name	Percentage content (%)
Zinc oxide	56.33
Carbonic acid	30.71
Silicon dioxide	9.36
Iron oxide	1.85
Water	0.57
Manganese oxide	0.50
Cadmium oxide	0.25
Calcium oxide	0.10
Total	99.67

Karsten also analyzed the composition of red calamine from Szarlej:

Substance name	Percentage content (%)
Zinc oxide	44.50
Carbonic acid	27.41
Iron oxide	13.25
Water	3.64
Aluminum trioxide	3.58
Lower oxidation state iron oxide	3.27
Manganese oxide	1.66
Silicon dioxide	0.66
Total	97.97

== Historical background ==
The history of ore mining in the Szarlej area dates back to the 13th century, around 1230. Mining intensified from the 16th century onwards. Lead ore in the form of galena, which lay above calamine deposits, was mined several hundred years before the establishment of the Szarlej mine. In 1670, Georg von Giesche explored calamine deposits in Upper and Lower Silesia, finding them in Szarlej, Stolarzowice, and Danielce (Radzionków). In 1701, he began calamine extraction in Szarlej and obtained a concession from Emperor Leopold I in 1704 for its mining; his mines in Szarlej annually extracted from 450 to 500 tons of calamine.

In 1788, the Dębówka mine was established, and in the 1790s, the Jenny and Otto mines were opened. From 1810 to 1818, the Sigismund zinc smelter operated in Szarlej, the third zinc smelter in Upper Silesia after the Wessola smelter in Wesoła and Lydognia in Chorzów (ArcelorMittal Poland Branch Huta Królewska), equipped with 10 distillation furnaces and owned by Georg von Giesches Erben. In 1813, another smelter, Concordia, was established near the calamine mines. The first steam engine in Szarlej was installed in 1814.

== History of the mine ==
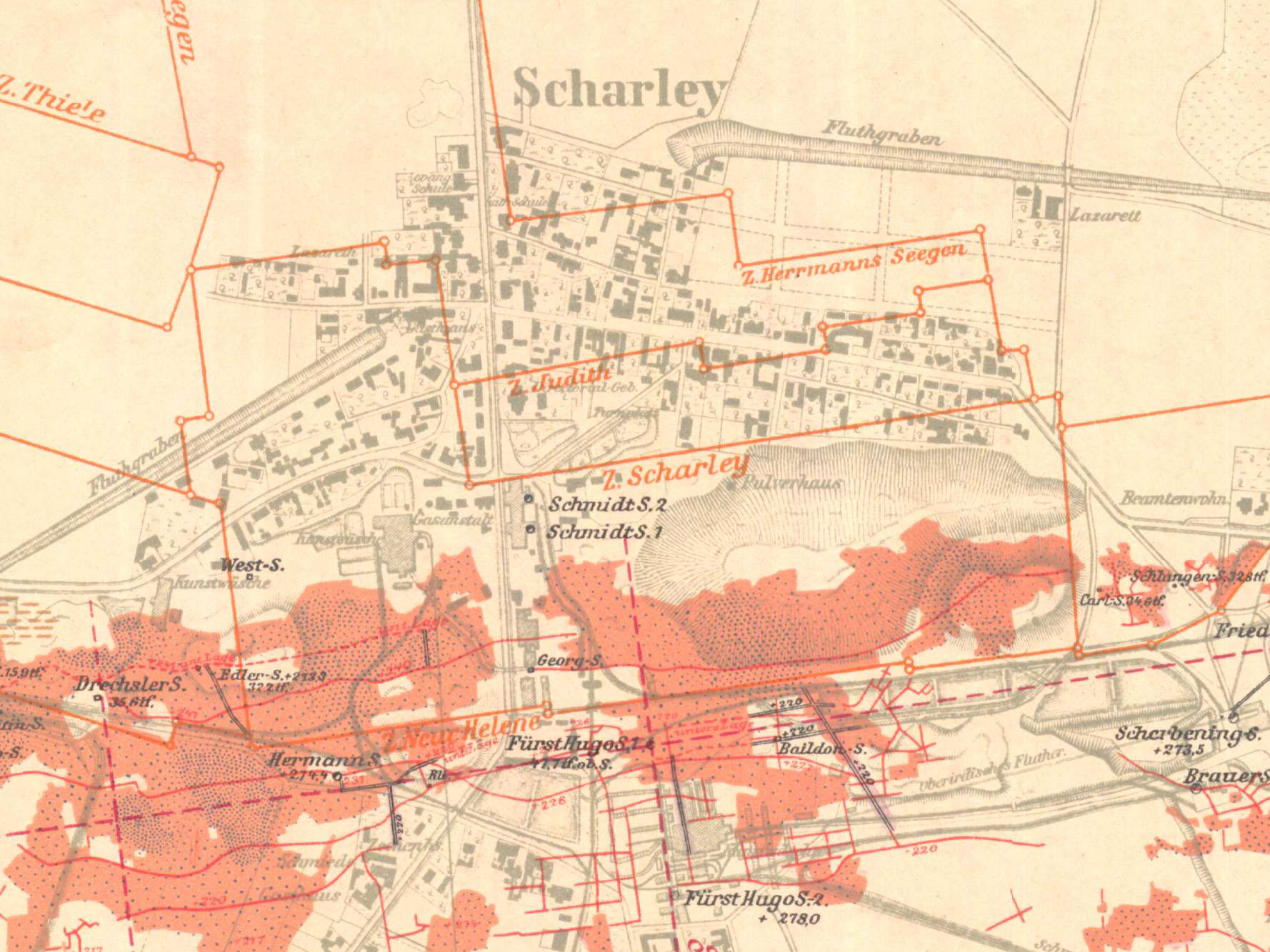
Boundaries of the Szarlej mine field. Schmidt shafts, among others, are marked; fragment of German geological map from 1912. Orange color marks the calamine deposit.

The mine was established in 1811 by the company Georg von Giesches Erben. From 1811 to 1812, this enterprise obtained mining grants for the mines: Sucha Góra, Schoris, Gabe Gottes, Georgssegen, and Szarlej (according to other sources, the founders were the Donnersmarcks, while Józef Piernikarczyk wrote that Baildon, together with Prince Kraft zu Hohenlohe-Oehringen, obtained the mining grant for the 'Neue Helene' and 'Szarlej' mines). The grants for the Szarlej mine were issued on August 5 and September 2, 1811. The mine was established, demarcated, and prepared for mining exploitation in 1812 (according to Roman Majorczyk, the mine was established in the 18th century by Georg von Giesche; miners brought from Olkusz were supposed to work there, but Giesche actually founded the Jerzy and Bernard mines; according to another source, the mine was established around 1743).

The mining field of the Szarlej mine covered 175,318 m^{2} (according to another source, 380,991 m^{2}). Extraction was conducted by the open-pit method by creating terraces. The deposit lay at a depth of about 1 to 4 lachters below the surface (about 2 to 8 meters); extraction was carried out in two open pits (German: Aufdeckarbeit): eastern and western, with the depth of the pits reaching 31 and 33 m before 1849. The higher quality ore (so-called stückgalmei and lead minerals) was transported to the surface in wheelbarrows by women and then piled near the road running from Bytom to Piekary Śląskie. Contaminated and clay-mixed material was directed to limestone settlers, where it was mixed with water and separated using the sedimentation process. Initially, open-pit mining involved deposits located above the groundwater level and was very limited. With descent below this level, there was a problem with a very strong inflow of water, so in 1814, a low-pressure steam drainage machine was installed.

Due to the inflow of groundwater, underground mining was also conducted (before 1853, the Erbreich shaft was sunk) using the room-and-pillar system, with a shaft depth of 8 to 12 lachters (about 16 to 24 m), and the shaft field it served was about 20 to 25 lachters long (about 40 to 50 m, data from around 1859). Around the mid-19th century, the shaft hoist consisted of two cages operated by a steam hoisting engine with a power of six horses, with a work efficiency of 200 hoisted carts in 10 hours. The ore in carts with a load capacity of 300 kg was transported on rails to a large washing plant, established by Rudolf von Carnall, located over 1,200 m away from the mining site. This section was divided into three 400-meter parts, within which young boys working 8 hours a day pushed full and empty carts.

In 1816, the calamine (zinc ore) production at the Szarlej mine amounted to 2,325 metric tons (45,747 long hundredweight), with a production cost of 3 groszy and 3 1/2 pfennigs. Until 1821, annual production did not exceed 5,100 t (100,000 long hundredweight). In 1847, Count Guido Henckel von Donnersmarck held 30 1/2 kuks of shares in the Szarlej mine, and Hugo Henckel von Donnersmarck had an equal share. The company Georg von Giesches Erben owned 57 kuks, and parts also belonged to the Schaffgotsch family and Karl Godulla. John Baildon acquired shares in the mine between 1820 and 1826.

In 1821, two additional mining field grants were obtained, and continuous extraction was conducted from 1822 to at least 1848, with another grant received in 1825.

From 1822 to 1823, the annual production of calamine was between 180,000 and 200,000 quintals (likely between 9,100 and 10,200 t). In 1823, 14,030 tonnes (276,195 long hundredweight) of ore were extracted. The average cost of obtaining one quintal was 2 groszy, and it was sold for further processing at 10 groszy, generating significant profit, amounting to over 3 million thalers in 1823. An official of the mine, Artur Miller, wrote:

The business was excellent [...] calamine was in high demand, fetching a good number of thalers. A large portion of the zinc, smelted in the Piekary foundries owned by the same owners as the mines, was loaded onto carts and transported to the Oder river, from where it went to Szczecin, and then further to Sweden, Denmark, America, and India. A large portion was used within Germany.

In 1828, due to a decline in zinc prices, the mine reduced its workforce to a quarter of its original size, and employees' wages were halved. The first high-pressure steam drainage machine was installed in the mine in 1834, and the first mechanical washing plant was built in the 1840s. Until the 1830s, the mine supplied more calamine than all the others in the region. Until 1845, it was the most profitable calamine mine (in 1845, the mine provided a profit of 3,086,760 thalers), contributing 66.3% of the overall income from calamine mines in the region, and the mine's shares were sold at very high prices. Previously unexplored galena was also encountered. In 1853, lead ore extraction in Szarlej amounted to 22.5% of the region's extraction, second only to the Fryderyk mine. The first million hundredweights were extracted in 1856. In 1858, the Szarlej mine extracted 55,410 tonnes (1,090,733 long hundredweight) of calamine with 997 employees. Annual calamine extraction reached up to 76,000 tonnes (1.5 million long hundredweight). The ore from the mine was sent to the Paulshütte smelter near Mysłowice. The following description of the mine has been preserved:

Here is the famous Szarlej mine, which we will reach after a short walk between tall chimneys and machine factories, to this enormous fissure that human hands have dug into the earth. A long, irregular, funnel-like artificially created valley lies 100 feet [30 m] below us. On one side it is covered with dead stone gravel, while on the other side it slopes down in terraces and is covered with a throng of industriously bustling workers, whose pickaxes swing and throw cut chunks down, where horses pull wagons loaded with ore on tracks into the dark mine, from which the ore is lifted to the surface using machines via a shaft.

Meanwhile, in 1856, Józef Lompa referred to Szarlej as a famous place for machinery and calamine and lead mines.

On 2 November 1864, a mudflow occurred in the Szarlej and Wilhelmine mines, resulting in the deaths of 14 people.

In the 1840s, drainage of the workings was achieved using three steam engines with a combined power of 54 horsepower, pumping water from a depth of 40 m. Around 1845, the mine employed approximately 500 people and extracted 26,820 tonnes (527,931 long hundredweight) of calamine. The Silesian Joint Stock Company for Mining and Metallurgy, established in 1853, acquired shares in the mine in the 1850s.

=== Szarlej Underground Construction Society ===
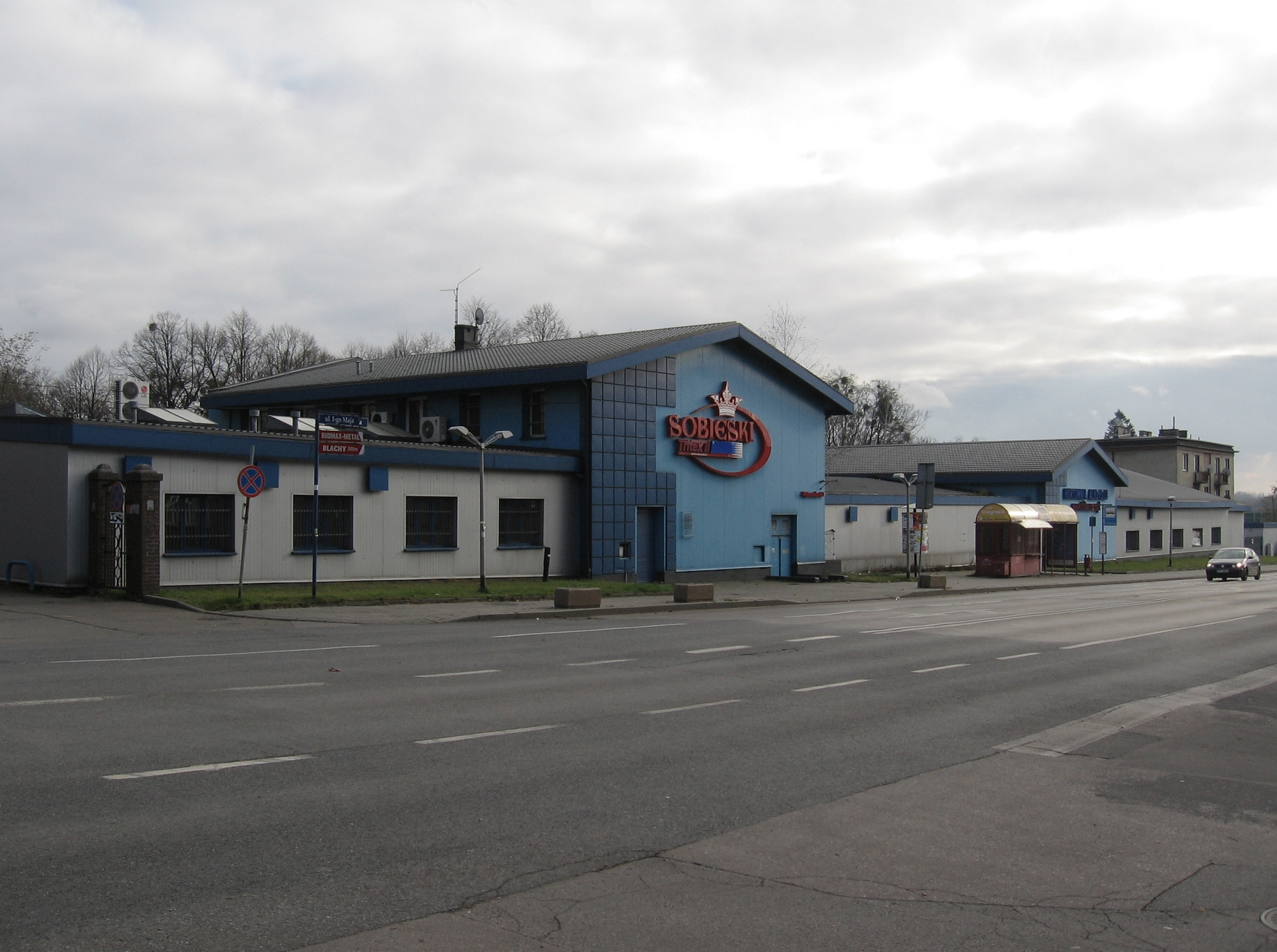
Buildings of the Tritex II alcohol wholesale company in Piekary Śląskie, formerly the headframe buildings of the Żwirki and Wigury shafts of the Waryński mine (originally Schmidt I and II) in Szarlej, 60 Bytomska Street in 2017

On 14 February 1855, the neighboring mines Szarlej, Wilhelmine, Cecylia, and Neue Helene founded the Szarlej Underground Construction Society (German: Scharleyer Tiefbau-Sozietät). The main tasks of the society were dewatering the workings located in the Szarlej basin (German: Scharleyer Erzmulde) and preventing surface water from entering the workings. A new agreement was adopted on 23 May 1865.

Until 1857, the project manager was mining master Carl Schmidt, representing the Wilhelmine and Cecylia mines. To achieve the first goal, five steam pumps with a total capacity of 79.29 m^{3}/min were used – three drainage machines at the drainage shafts: Schmidt I (sinking began in 1855, drainage machine put into use in 1858, in 1859 riveted pipes made of 9.5-millimetre (3/8 in) thick boiler plate with a diameter of 910 millimetres (36 in) were installed) and II (sunk in 1860, the first steam machine started in 1863, the second in 1869), and two at the Scherbening shaft (the first machine, which worked in the Woolf system, was installed in 1875). The shafts were 84 m deep and reached the 4th level, but the Neue Helene and Cecylia mines had a fifth level, 16 m deeper than the fourth, reached by the Christian-Krafft (from the Neue Helene mine) and Clotilde (from the Cecylia mine) shafts. Water from the 5th level to the 4th level was pumped out by the drainage machines at these shafts. Additionally, the Szarlej mine had the Georg and Edeler machine drainage shafts.

Divers equipped with English breathing apparatus suits (air was supplied directly to the suit through a hose from a pump), which were preferred over the newer breathing apparatus of Auguste Denayrouze and Benoît Rouquayrol due to headaches experienced with their use, were used for work in the flooded areas.

To prevent floods, the Brynica river was regulated, a flood embankment was built, and an underground flood control channel was constructed.

The Silesian Joint Stock Company for Mining and Metallurgical Operations, founded by Guido Henckel von Donnersmarck in 1853, became a co-owner of the mine, with most shares belonging to the princes of Hohenlohe.

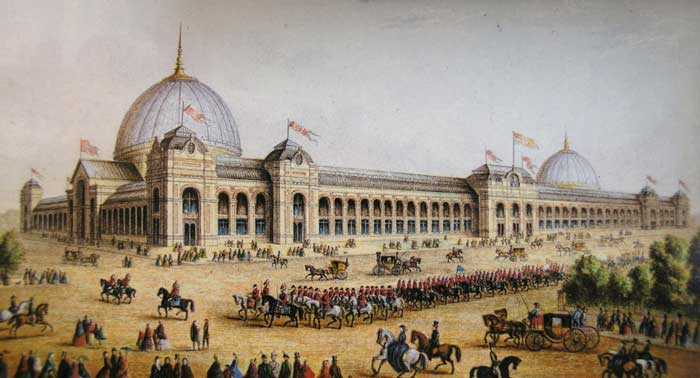
International Exhibition in 1862, South Kensington, London

In 1861, a new washing plant was built for the mine, equipped with two boilers from the C. Hoppe plant in Berlin; in 1863, a third boiler from H. Koetz in Zabrze was added (in 1888, the washing plant was purchased by the Jenny Otto zinc and lead ore mine from Rozbark).

The main building of the washing plant had an area of 67 by 15 metres (220 ft × 50 ft) and housed a processing plant for lead ore (which occurred in small concentrations together with dolomite and calamine) and calamine. The calamine washing plant was equipped with a high-pressure steam engine. The second building had an area of 67 by 7.5 metres (220 ft × 25 ft) and contained lead ore and calamine sludge processing plants and a boiler room. Near the washing plant were two settlers, one for lead sludge and the other for calamine sludge.

=== Decline of operations ===
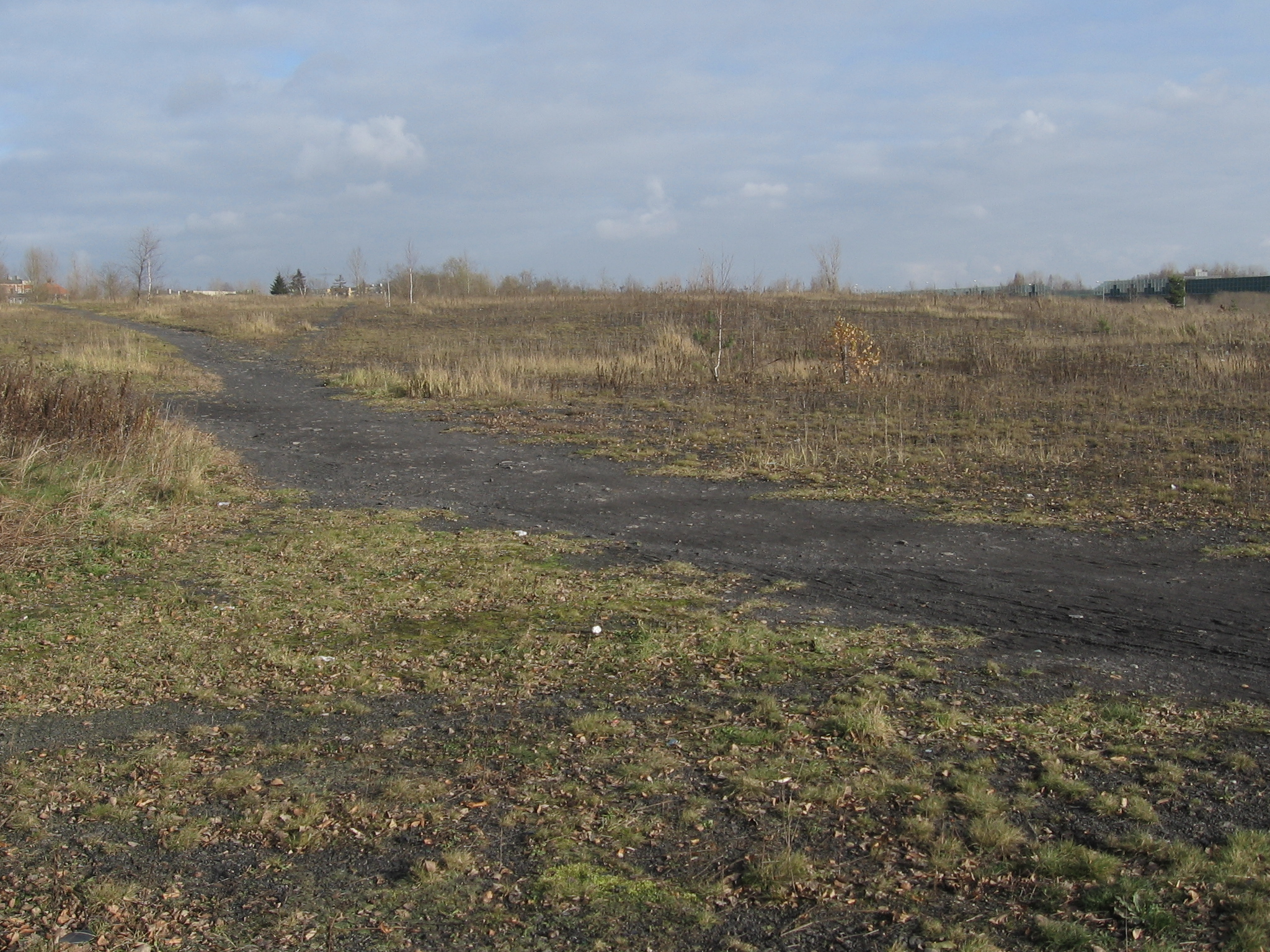
Leveled area of the former mine in 2017

Around 1870, the richest exploited deposit of calamine was largely depleted, with the pure zinc content in the ore dropping from 30% to about 12%, similar to the situation in the Maria mine. Later, calamine was recovered from the old dumps of the Szarlej mine. Due to favorable economic conditions, a new miners' lead ore mine, Friedrich Wilhelm, was opened next to this mine in 1858.

On 12 April 1875, one of the three drainage machines belonging to the society suddenly stopped working. The cause of the accident might have been a failure of the pressure valve. The incident was serious because the remaining two machines were unable to pump out enough incoming water. Two divers, Upper Silesians Wrona and Bulla, conducted repairs for several days. Wrona spent a total of 16 hours underwater, and Bulla 10 hours, with the work being carried out without lighting.

Due to the gradual depletion of the Szarlej mine's resources, the company Georg von Giesches Erben acquired the consolidated Bleischarley mine (including the Gute Concordia, Neue Euridice, and Solfatara mines) from Count Guido Henckel von Donnersmarck: the first half in 1858 (or in 1860), and the second in 1868.

In the second half of the 19th century, the co-owner of the mine was the Silesian Joint Stock Company for Mining and Metallurgical Operations, which in 1885 held shares amounting to 30 1/2 kuks. At that time, the company also operated an iron(II) disulfide (in the form of pyrite or marcasite) mine called Nix, in which the Silesian Joint Stock Company had a 25% stake. In 1887, the Szarlej mine ceased ore extraction and instead turned to the material lying on old dumps, which caused a one-time increase in the plant's production.

The mine continued operations at least until 1894, with 7,500 tons of calamine reported in 1896.

The area of the former mine was considered as a possible site for the construction of the Liberation Mound. Borrow pits were eliminated by filling them with metallurgical waste, and the site of the mining plant was referred to by locals as Rozciep.

== Discoveries on the mine site ==
In the Pleistocene sediments, mammal remains have been preserved. Around 1854, the bones of a woolly mammoth, Przewalski's horse, and a damaged horn, probably belonging to an aurochs, were found on the Szarlej mine site.

Before 1829, a human skeleton was discovered in a shaft at a depth from 15 to 16 metres (8 to 9 fathoms). One of the broken bones revealed the presence of blue vivianite crystals inside. When the femur was sawed through, internal crystallization was also observed, as well as on the surface of the cut, indicating that vivianite had formed within the bone mass. Vivianite could have formed due to the presence of phosphoric acid precipitated from the bone. Traube speculated that the skeleton, possibly belonging to a miner, might have lain underground for around 300 years. It might have come from earlier lead ore mining activities in the area. However, the exact age of the remains is not known. It is possible that the shaft, dug in search of calamine, was flooded, in which case the bones would not have been several hundred years old at the time of discovery.

== Social conditions ==
The work system at the mine operated in two shifts: the first shift worked from 6 AM to 6 PM, and the second from 6 PM to 6 AM. The miners' wages were insufficient to meet basic needs, but workers received part of their earnings in the form of vouchers. The working conditions are illustrated by the experiences of Polish crew members: Józef Duda requested leave to bandage a cut hand. He was not granted permission to leave his post and died a few days later due to infection. Meanwhile, workers Wanot and Franiel were dismissed for bringing a copy of the Dziennik Górnośląski newspaper to work, and Cieśla and Poczek, who also brought a Polish newspaper, were reassigned to lower-paying jobs.

On 14 July 1873, miners began a sit-in strike to protest low wages. The starosta of Bytom, Solger, came to negotiate with the workers. Clashes with Prussian police and military ensued, resulting in the deaths of nine miners. The strike ended after five days. The Criminal Chamber in Bytom sentenced three strikers, Markiewka, Pyrkosz, and Rabsztyn, to 12 months of imprisonment. However, the strike achieved wage increases and reduced working hours for juveniles and women by one hour.

The mining industry also spurred the development of Szarlej itself. Lucjan Malinowski wrote in 1877: In Szarlej (calamine mines) there is gas lighting, perhaps even better than in Warsaw.

== Bibliography ==
- Wackenroder, Heinrich; Bley, Ludwig (1847). Archiv der Pharmacie, eine Zeitschrift des Apotheker-Vereins in Norddeutschland (in German). Vol. 49 (99). Hannover: Hahn'schen Hofbuchhandlung.
- Bernhardi, Friedrich (1908). "Die Wasserlösung auf den Scharleyer Zink- und Bleierz-Gruben". Friedrich Bernhardis gesammelte Schriften (in German). Gebrüder Böhm: Kattowitz.
- Blasig, J. (1876). "Die Schlesische Zink-Produktion und der Handel mit Schlesischem Rohzink in Breslau". Yn 595 (in German). Breslau: Im Selbstverlage des Verfassers.
- Voltz (1913). Handbuch des Oberschlesischen Industriebezirks. Als Band Il der Festschrift zum XII. Allgemeinen Deutschen Bergmannstage in Breslau 1913 herausgegeben vom Oberschlesischen Berg- und Hüttenmännischen Verein (in German). Kattowitz: Selbstverlag des Oberschlesischen Berg- und Hüttenmännischen Vereins, E. V.
- Ingalls, Walter Renton (1902). Production and properties of zinc. A treatise on the occurrence and distribution of zinc ore, the commercial and technical conditions affecting the production of spelter, its chemical and physical properties and uses in the arts, together with a historical and statistical review of the industry (PDF). New York and London: The Engineering and Mining Journal.
- Jaros, Jerzy; Minkus, Jerzy (1969). "Miasta, osiedla i gromady". In Rechowicz, Henryk (ed.). Tarnowskie Góry. Zarys rozwoju powiatu (in Polish). Katowice: Śląsk.
- Kosmann, Bernhard, ed. (1888). Oberschlesien, sein Land und seine Industrie: Festschrift für die XXIX. Haupt-Versammlung des Vereins Deutscher Ingenieure zu Breslau (PDF) (in German). Gleiwitz: Oberschlesischen Bezirks-Vereins deutscher Ingenieure zu Kattowitz. Archived (PDF) from the original on 2018-01-13.
- Kunitz (1864). "Die Galmei- und Bleierzwäsche der Scharleygrube in Oberschlesien" (PDF). Die Baulichen Anlagen auf den Berg-, Hütten- und Salinenwerken in Preussen (in German). XI. Königlichen Geheimen Ober-Hofbuchdruckerei (R. v. Decker). Archived (PDF) from the original on 2018-01-12.
- Kwaśny, Zbigniew (1983). "Rozwój przemysłu na Górnym Śląsku w pierwszej połowie XIX wieku". Acta Universitatis Wratislaviensis No 570. Historia (in Polish). XXXIX. Wydawnictwo Uniwersytetu Wrocławskiego.
- Majorczyk, Roman (1985). Historia górnictwa kruszcowego w rejonie Bytomia (PDF) (in Polish). Bytom: Tytuł.
- Manes, M. (1826). "Notice sur les mines et usines à zinc de la Silésie supérieure". Annales des mines, ou Recueil de mémoires sur l'exploitation des mines, et sur lès sciences et les arts qui s'y rapportent (PDF) (in French). Vol. XII. Paris: Treuttel et Wurtz.
- Mauve, L. (1864). "Ueber die Wasserhaltung auf den Galmei- und Bleierzgruben Oberschlesiens, mit besonder des Scharleyer Tiefbaues". Zeitschrift für das Berg-, Hütten- und Salinenwesen im preussischen Staate (in German). XII.
- Neumann, Bernhard (1904). Die Metalle. Geschichte, Vorkommen un Gewinnung (in German). Halle: Wilhelm Knapp.
- Popiołek, Kazimierz (1965). Górnośląski przemysł górniczo-hutniczy w drugiej połowie XIX wieku (in Polish). Katowice / Kraków: Śląski Instytut Naukowy w Katowicach.
- Reports on the Vienna Universal Exhibition of 1873. London: George E. Eyre and William Spottiswoode. 1874.
- Rivot, Louis-Edouard; Lejeune (1848). "Notes sur le gisement des minerais de zinc et de plomb dans la Haute-Silesie, recueillies dans un voyage fait en 1846". Annales des mines, ou Recueil de mémoires sur l'exploitation des mines, et sur lès sciences et les arts qui s'y rapportent. XIII. Quatrième série (in French). Paris: Carilian-Goeury et V^{or} Dalmont.
- Roemer, Ferdinand (1870). Geologie von Oberschlesien (PDF) (in German). Breslau: Robert Nischkowsky.
- Scharenberg (1854). "Ueber fossile Knochen aus der Galmeigrube bei Scharlei in Oberschlesien". Zwei und dreissigster Jahres-Bericht der Schlesischen Gesellschaft für Vaterländische Kultur (PDF) (in German). Breslau: Druck von Graß, Barth und Comp. (W. Friedrich.).
- Serlo, Albert (1878). Leitfaden zur Bergbaukunde (PDF). Zweiter Band (in German). Berlin: Verlag von Julius Springer.
- Speier, Paul (1885). Entstehung und Entwickelung der Oberschlesischen Montan-Industrie und die Oberschlesischen Montan-Aktien-Werthe (PDF) (in German). Breslau: Selbstverlag des Bersassers.
- Nadolski, Przemysław (2009). Piekary Śląskie na starych pocztówkach =: auf den alten Postkarten. Radzionków; Bytom: Przedsiębiorstwo Produkcyjno-Handlowo-Usługowe "Rococo" - Jarosław Krawczyk. ISBN 978-83-86293-60-5.
- Traube, H. (1888). Die Minerale Schlesiens (PDF) (in German). Breslau: J. U. Kern's Verlag (Max Müller).
- Wedding, Hermann (1862). Official Catalogue of the Mining and Metallurgical Products; Class I. in the Zollverein Department of the International Exhibition 1862. Berlin: Royal Prussian State Printing-Office.
- Żydek, Konrad (1972). Wilczek, Stanisław (ed.). Od Pecare do Piekar Śląskich. Opowieść o dziejach Piekar Śląskich (in Polish). Piekary Śląskie: Nakładem Komitetu Obchodów 900-lecia Piekar Śląskich.
