= Neudeck Palace =

Former palace in Świerklaniec, Poland

Coordinates: 50.4321°N 18.9547°E

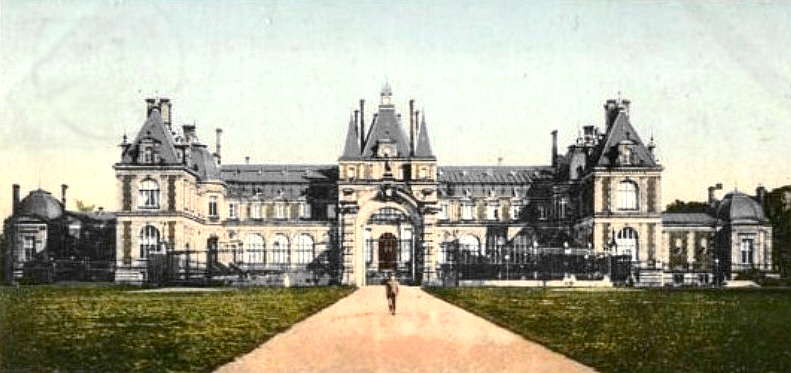
The New Palace (the Upper Silesian Versailles) at the turn of the century

Neudeck Palace (Polish: Zamek w Świerklańcu; German: Schloss Neudeck; Silesian: Zōmek we Swierklancie) was the residence of the aristrocratic Henckel von Donnersmarck family in Upper Silesia. The palace complex and park was one of the largest and most magnificent in the German Empire and was popularly known as Little Versailles or Upper Silesian Versailles. It is located around two kilometers south-east of the town of Neudeck (Polish: Świerklaniec) in the Tarnowskie Góry County in Poland.

The Old and New Palace were set on fire by the Red Army in 1945 and demolished in August 1961. Today, the complex consists of the palace park, the Cavalier Palace, the Donnersmarck funeral chapel and several farm buildings and monuments.

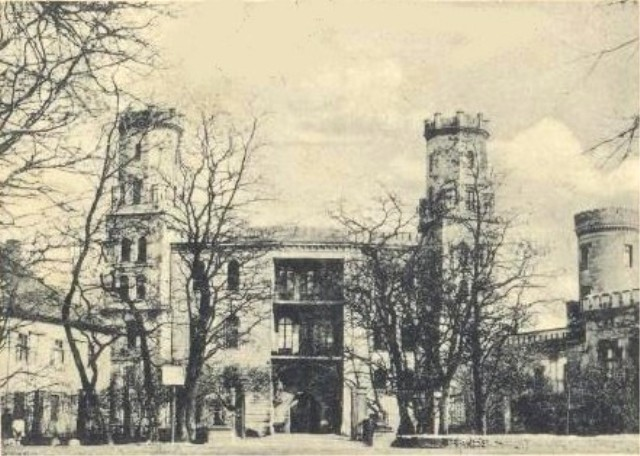
The Old Palace at the same time

== History ==
In the Middle Ages, the area around today's Świerklaniec was a strategically important point, as the Brynica formed a natural border between Silesia and Poland. In addition, an important trade route ran from Częstochowa to Bytom. As early as the 11th century, a manor house was built to fortify the border, which later became the present-day Old Castle. It was surrounded by a moat and a mound of earth for defense purposes. It was also the seat of a starost of Boleslaus the Brave. In 1179, Duke Mieszko I of Ratibor acquired the manor from the Polish Duke Casimir II. Later, it was the Cieszyn princes who took over the Świerklaniec estate from the Ratibors in 1337. The manor was probably expanded into a fortified castle by Duke Konrad II of Oels during this transitional period, although there were 18 principalities and several estates in Silesia at this time, meaning that almost every major town was the seat of its own principality.

The 15th century was characterized by many changes of rule. The last documented mention of the Cieszyns as owners was in 1451. In 1477, Świerklaniec was first mentioned as part of the Duchy of Bytom and in the same year the name of the border castle Swiklenczy was mentioned for the first time. The Opole Duke John II, the last Opole Piast, acquired the area around Bytom for 19,000 guilders in 1498 and rebuilt the existing castle. Bricks were used in the Gothic style. At this time, Neudeck was part of the most important Silesian principality. When John ran out of money in 1526, the castle had to be mortgaged. Six years later, in 1532, the year of his death, the lordship of Neudeck and the entire surrounding area fell to Georg von Brandenburg-Ansbach and thus to the House of Hohenzollern. This gave Świerklaniec a certain political significance for the first time, which lasted a good hundred years. During the Thirty Years' War, the Hohenzollern lost their entire Upper Silesian possessions to the Habsburgs in 1621, who were only able to call them their own for a very short time.

=== Ownership by the Donnersmarcks ===
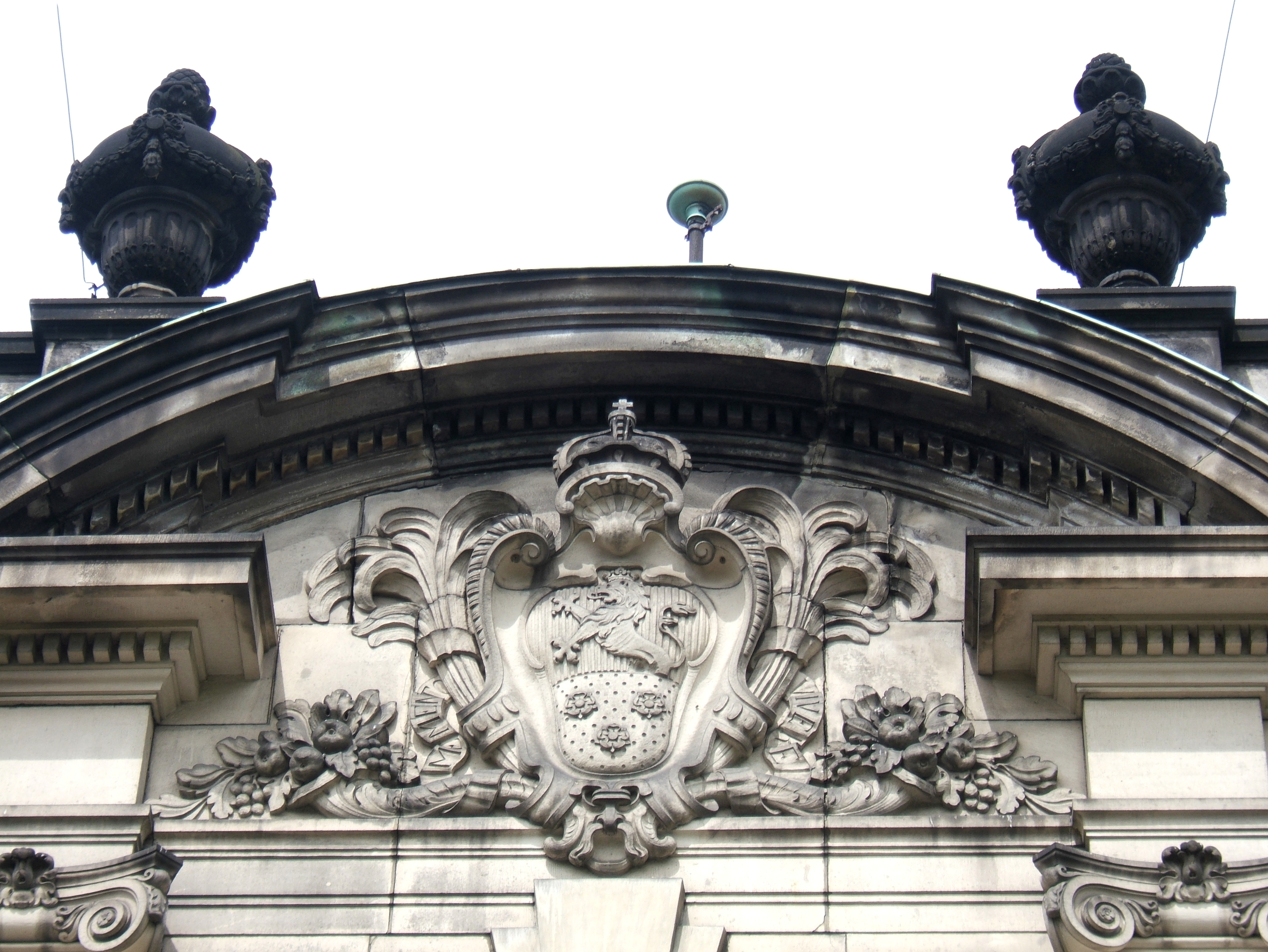
Donnersmarck coat of arms on the façade of the Kavalierspalast

In 1623, Lazarus I Henckel von Donnersmarck initially received the estate as a pledge from the Silesian High and Princely Court, thus ushering in the long Donnersmarck era. The name Neudeck appears for the first time in this context. On May 26, 1629, his son Lazarus II officially purchased the Neudeck estates from Emperor Ferdinand II and made Neudeck the seat of a Donnersmarck line. From then on, the entire Donnersmarck estate was indivisible hereditary property. The family was elevated to imperial counts in 1651. In 1670, the hereditary lands were divided into the entailed estates of Beuthen (Byton) and Tarnowitz-Neudeck. The first representative of the Protestant Tarnowitz-Neudeck line was Carl Maximilian Count Henckel von Donnersmarck. Between 1670 and 1680, he had the old castle redesigned by an Italian into a prestigious Renaissance residence with an adjoining park. In keeping with the spirit of the times, the castle was "modernized" in Baroque style in the 18th century.

=== The 19th century ===
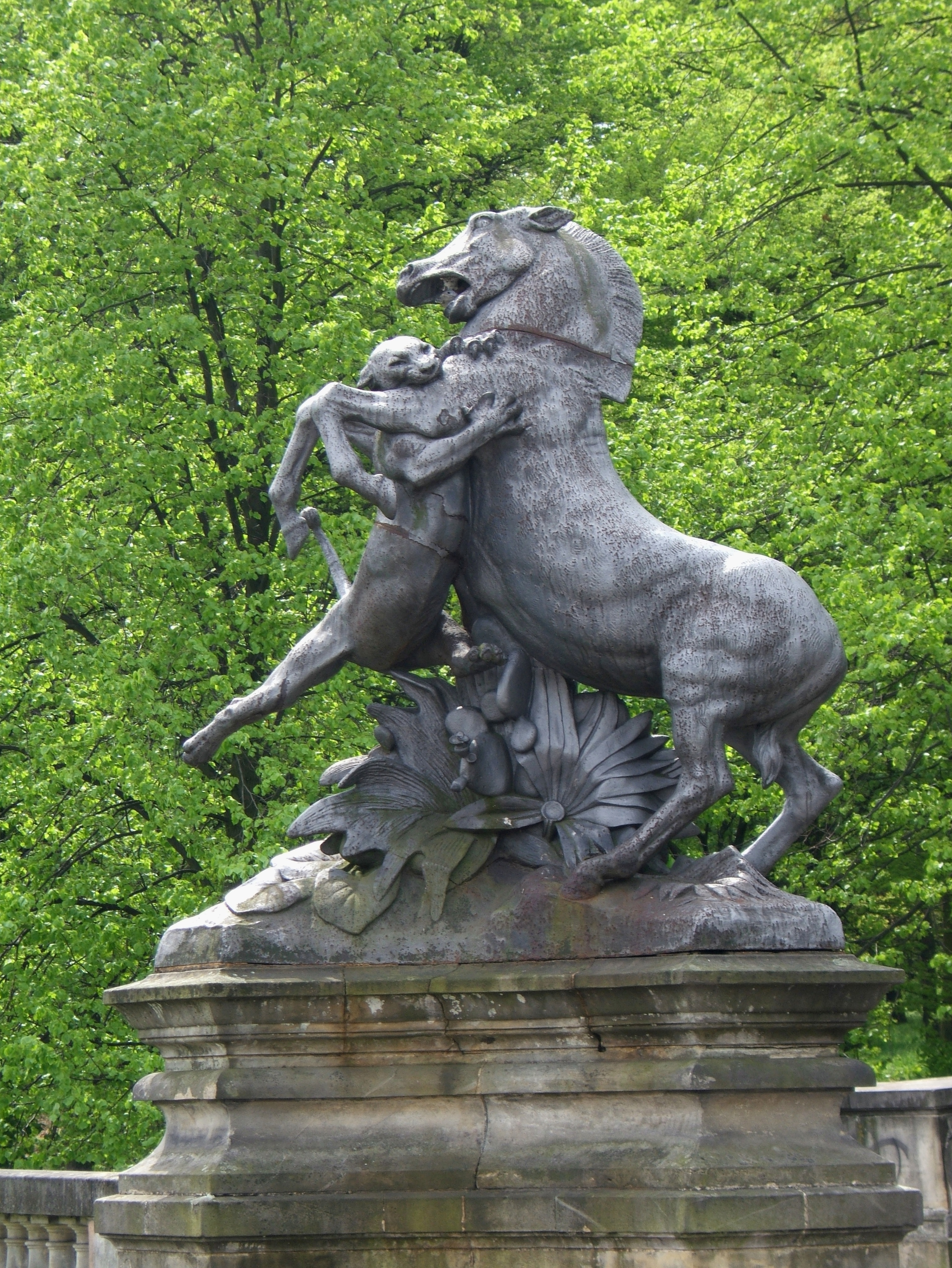
Frémiet Sculpture in the castle park

In the 19th century, Count Carl Lazarus increased the family's holdings by purchasing new estates. It was during this time that the estate underwent its most significant alterations. First, the old castle was extended and rebuilt in the Tudor style. In 1848, Carl Lazarus transferred his entire estate to his son Guido Count Henckel von Donnersmarck, probably the most important scion of the family.

The construction of a new, second palace was then begun on the large lake in the palace park in 1868 following his commission. Initially, the French architect Pierre Manguin was in charge of the construction work. In close stylistic reference to the Château de Pontchartrain, Donnersmarck's new residence was built in the neo-baroque style. After Manguin's death (1869), Hector Lefuel, then chief architect of the new Louvre, took over the construction management and completed the new building in 1876. Since then, the Tudor style palace has also been known as the Old Palace. The third and smallest palace, the Cavalier Palace, was built to the south-east of the New Palace until 1906.

An Irish engineer called Fox was commissioned to design the 250-hectare park in 1865, based on plans by Peter Joseph Lenné, who died shortly afterwards, and his pupil Gustav Meyer. An English-style landscape park was created, interspersed with groves, small wooded areas and meadows and crossed by small streams with stone and cast-iron bridges. Neudeck thus not only had one of the most magnificent palace complexes, but also one of the largest parks in the German Empire.

The place was visited several times by Emperor Wilhelm II, who not only went hunting in the surrounding wooded areas, but also often took loans from the Count. Finally, he elevated Count Guido to the rank of prince (Guido Prince Henckel Fürst von Donnersmarck) for his services. Neudeck was thus also a princely seat. From here, extensive estates with a total area of 27,500 hectares were administered throughout East Central Europe, above all in Upper Silesia (ownership of numerous mines), but also in Austrian Galicia and in Russian-occupied Congress Poland.

=== Interwar period ===
In 1922, Neudeck fell to Poland after the referendum in Upper Silesia and has since been called Świerklaniec again. However, the Donnersmarcks were able to save their property under Polish rule, as Guido's son Kraft opted for Poland in the referendum. From 1924 to 1937, the former President of the Swiss Confederation Felix Calonder lived in the castle as President of the Mixed Commission for Upper Silesia. His task was to monitor compliance with the German–Polish Convention regarding Upper Silesia as an independent observer.

=== Destruction and the post-war period ===
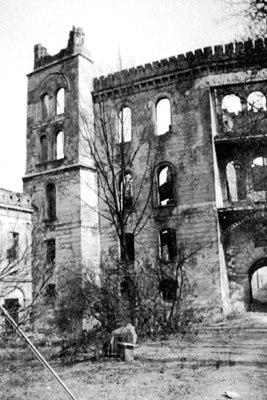
Das Alte Schloss 1958

During the German invasion of Poland in 1939, Świerklaniec was occupied by German troops, as was the whole of Eastern Upper Silesia. The 316-year reign of the Henckel von Donnersmarck family in Neudeck finally came to an end in 1945. The family was expropriated by the communists and the Old Palace and the New Palace were destroyed by arson by the Red Army at the end of the war. The local population completed the destruction by plundering the interior and devastating the exterior and the park. The two formerly important palaces remained as ruins, which were neither preserved nor rebuilt in the post-war period, but were finally demolished in 1961. Although the Kavalierspalast was also affected in 1945, the damage was limited and it was later rebuilt. Even though the Neudeck castle ensemble is only partially preserved today, the park and the preserved buildings and monuments are very popular as an excursion destination.

== Architecture and building history ==
Site map

=== Park ===
The entire palace complex is surrounded by a 154-hectare park; at the time of its creation, it was one of the largest in Germany at around 200 hectares. The Baroque Garden à la française and landscape park, with significant statues by 19th-century artist Emmanuel Frémiet and fountains that survived, is within the former Palace's extensive forested landscape grounds. Two pairs of lion statues survived, now decorating parks in Zabrze and Gliwice, as well as a wrought iron gate currently at the Silesian Zoological Garden in the Katowice and Chorzów districts of Silesia.

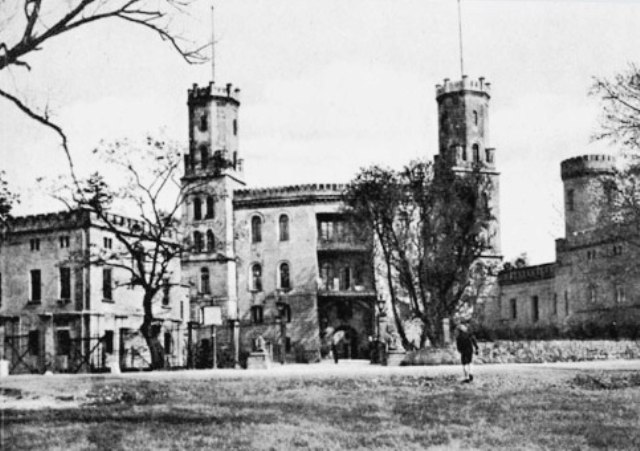
Old palace

=== Old palace ===
The appearance of the castle until 1945 was due to its reconstruction in the 1840s. Among other things, the irregular, ultimately baroque remodeled complex was given neo-Gothic wings, which formed an outer bailey. Later, two octagonal Tudor-style towers were added and the previously large windows were reduced in size to match the style. This gave it a castle-like character again. However, the count's family only lived in the castle for a few decades and it finally lost its importance in 1875 in favor of the new residence. In 1961, the well-preserved ruins were demolished. Today, there are hardly any remnants of the historic castle left.

=== New Palace ===
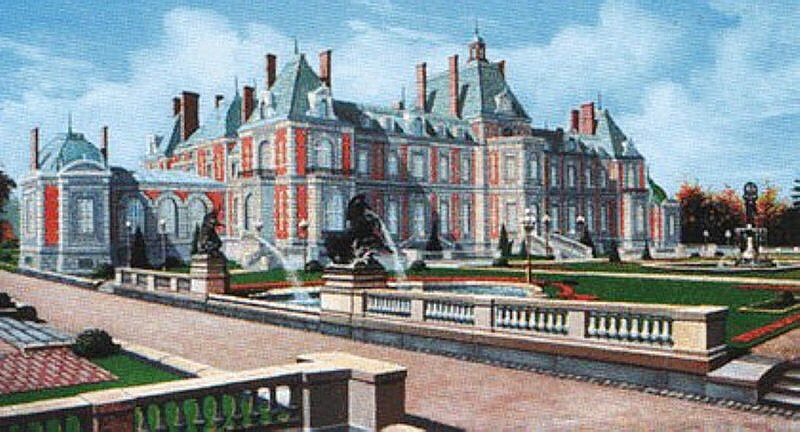
New palace with park

Although the New Palace was only built in the 19th century, it formed the center of the entire complex. The idea for a new palace came from Guido's future wife, Blanka Marquise de Païva, who wanted a new representative palace instead of the old, irregular palace on the edge of the park. The palace was an elongated, magnificent neo-baroque building that was in no way inferior to the great European palaces. Although the palace was later referred to as Little Versailles or Upper Silesian Versailles due to its size, the model for the building was, as mentioned above, the palace in Pontchartrain near Paris, which was also owned by Prince von Donnersmarck from 1857 to 1888. The central section was provided with a high roof and a small lantern on top, thus elevating the north and south wings of the castle. Four higher roofs were added to the sides, which protruded like bay windows. Single-storey pavilions were added to the south and north. A clock and a wrought-iron fence were attached to the west-facing entrance front for guests, forming a semi-circular forecourt. It was interrupted by a high lion-crowned entrance gate (now in Chorzów Zoo). Terraces with balustrades were built on the east side of the park, from which the lake could be reached via steps. These terraces with the water basins and sculptures are the only remains that survived after the demolition in 1961. They give an idea of the splendor of the complex. The remarkable sculptures depict fighting animals and were created by the French sculptor Emmanuel Frémiet.

Statements about the layout and appearance of the interior can only be made on the basis of descriptions, as no photographs or plans have survived and nothing was documented during the demolition. However, it is known that the castle had 99 rooms, and a brief description of the castle mentions five halls. The most magnificent is said to have been the ballroom with its galleries.

=== Cavalier's Palace ===
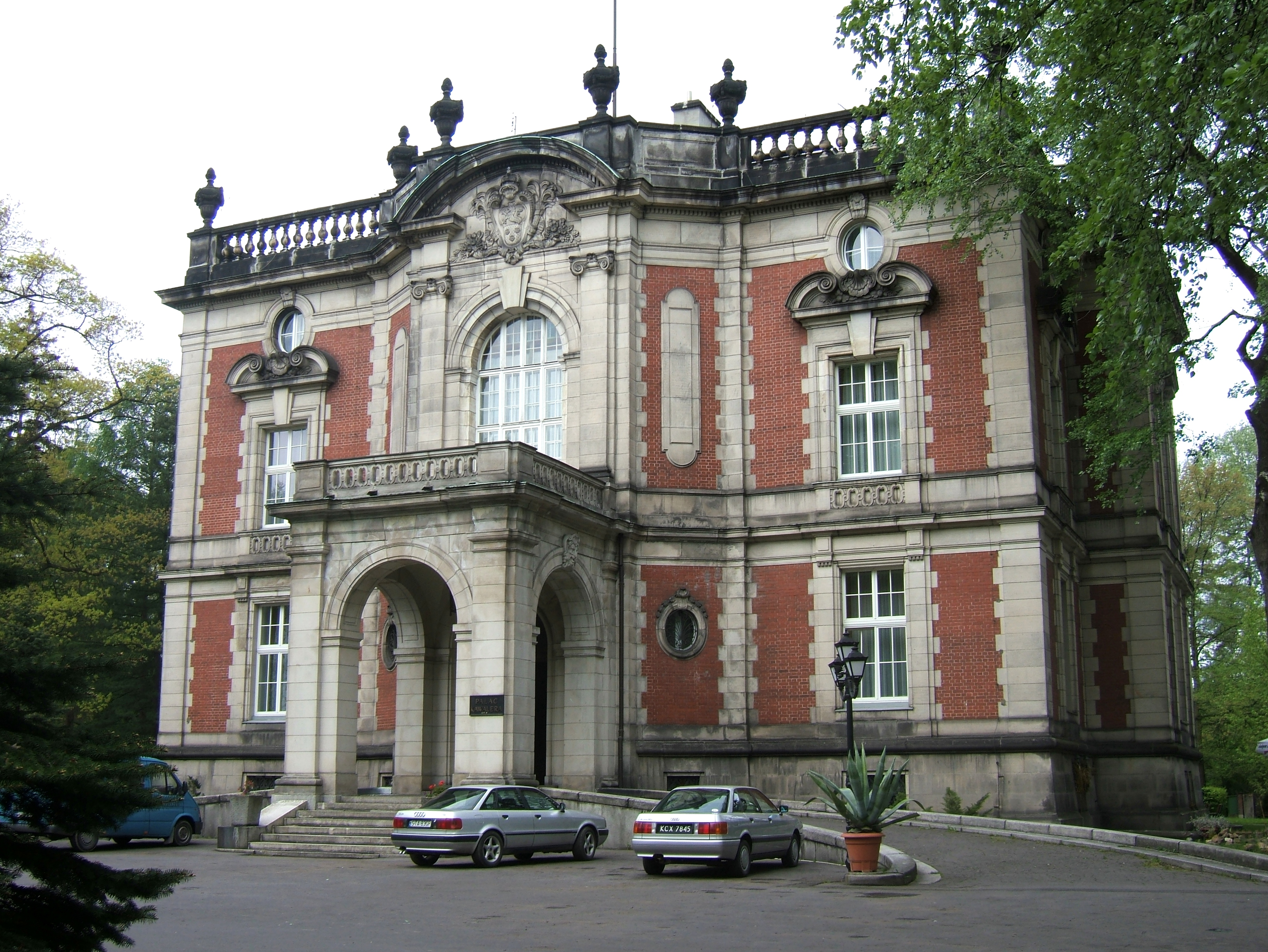
The front of the Kavalierspalast

The Cavalier's Palace (Pałac Kawalera in Polish and Kavalierspalast in German) is the only secular building to have survived the devastation of 1945. As the last part of the complex, it was built at the beginning of the 20th century as a residence for the younger members of the family and as a guest house in the immediate vicinity of the New Palace. The main reason for the construction was that there was not enough space in the two palaces to accommodate the family's many guests and a guest house was urgently needed.

The Berlin architect and court architect Ernst von Ihne was commissioned with the plans, but he had to adhere to the specifications of the count's building commission. The building was erected between 1903 and 1906 in the neo-Renaissance style. The almost square building was constructed from brick, which contrasts with the rich stucco crowning of the window frames and the natural stone parts of the façade. The entrance is formed by an elliptical bay window made of natural stone and decorated with the Henckel von Donnersmarck family coat of arms, preceded by a balcony with arcades

Since 1992, the building has housed a hotel with a restaurant. Together with the park, the Cavalier's Palace is the main attraction of modern Świerklaniec.

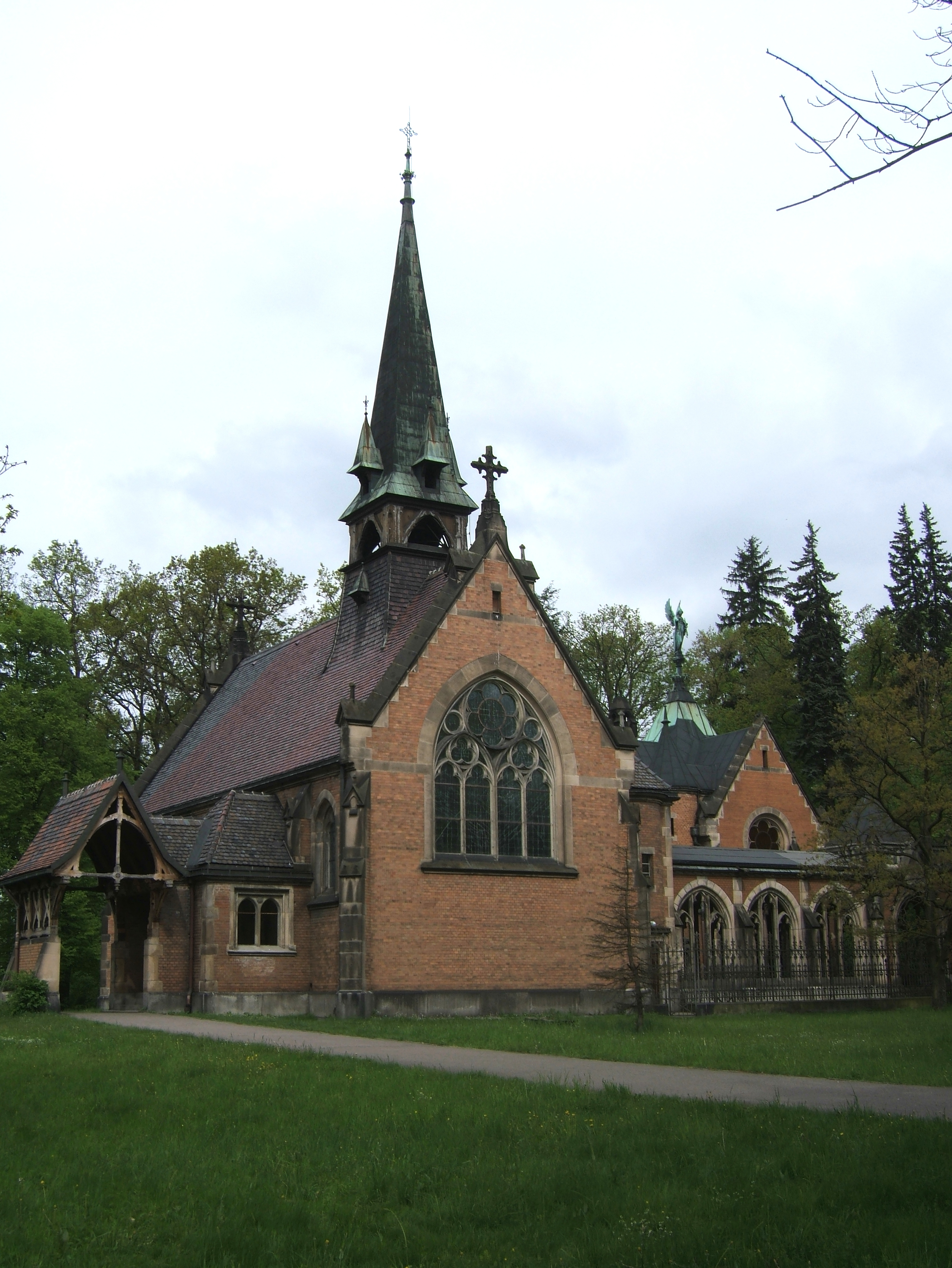
The Donnersmarck funeral chapel

=== Funeral chapel ===
The preserved neo-Gothic burial chapel of the Donnersmarcks was built between 1895 and 1897 by Julius Carl Raschdorff to the north-east of the old palace. The building is surrounded by canals and centuries-old trees. The graceful neo-Gothic chapel has a rectangular shape and is crowned by a ridge turret. On the north side is a cloister with the adjoining mausoleum itself. An angel of death made of copper is attached to the top of the roof of the square building, symbolizing the function of the building. The many sculptural details include a relief of the Agnus Dei (Lamb of God) and several gargoyles. Inside, the old furnishings could not be preserved as the church was plundered after the Second World War. In the following years, the local parish made efforts to take over the burial chapel and bought it in 1947. After overcoming numerous bureaucratic hurdles, the chapel was reconsecrated in 1957 after it had been renovated and refurnished. However, it was not yet saved: Over the next few years, it fell into disrepair again as, for political reasons, it could only be entered for an entrance fee, even by those attending church services, and was therefore hardly used. Later, plans were discussed to demolish the chapel or convert it into a changing room with toilets for a new swimming pool. However, the parish finally managed to renovate the church in three years up to 1983. Today, the chapel serves as a branch church for the local Catholic community.

== Literature ==
- Danuta Emmerling u. a.: Górnośląskie Zamki i Pałace. ADAN, Opole 1999, ISBN 83-908136-8-8.
- Josef von Golitschek: Schlesien – Land der Schlösser. 286 Schlösser in 408 Meisterfotos. Bd. 2. Moschen bis Zyrowa. Orbis, München 1988, ISBN 3-572-09275-2.
- Irma Kozina: Pałace i zamki na pruskim Górnym Śląsku w latach 1850–1914. Muzeum Śląskie, Katowice 2001, ISBN 83-87455-36-9. (German part: Schlösser und Landhäuser in Oberschlesien 1850–1914)
- Jarosław Aleksander Krawczyk, Arkadiusz Kuzio-Podrucki: Zamki i pałace Donnersmarcków / Schlösser der Donnersmarcks. 2. Auflage. Rococo, Radzionków 2003, ISBN 83-86293-37-3.
- Anna Ocieczek: Załozenie pałacowe Świerklańca. (Die Residenzanlage Neudeck). Diplomarbeit. Sozialwissenschaftliche Fakultät der Schlesischen Universität, Katowice ca. 2000.
- Hermann Reuffurth: Neudecker Neubauten. O. O. 1908.
- Marek Zgórniak: Le Château Świerklaniec, œuvre oubliée d'Hector Lefuel. In: La revue du Louvre et des Musées de France. Paris 1989.
