= La Païva =

French courtesan

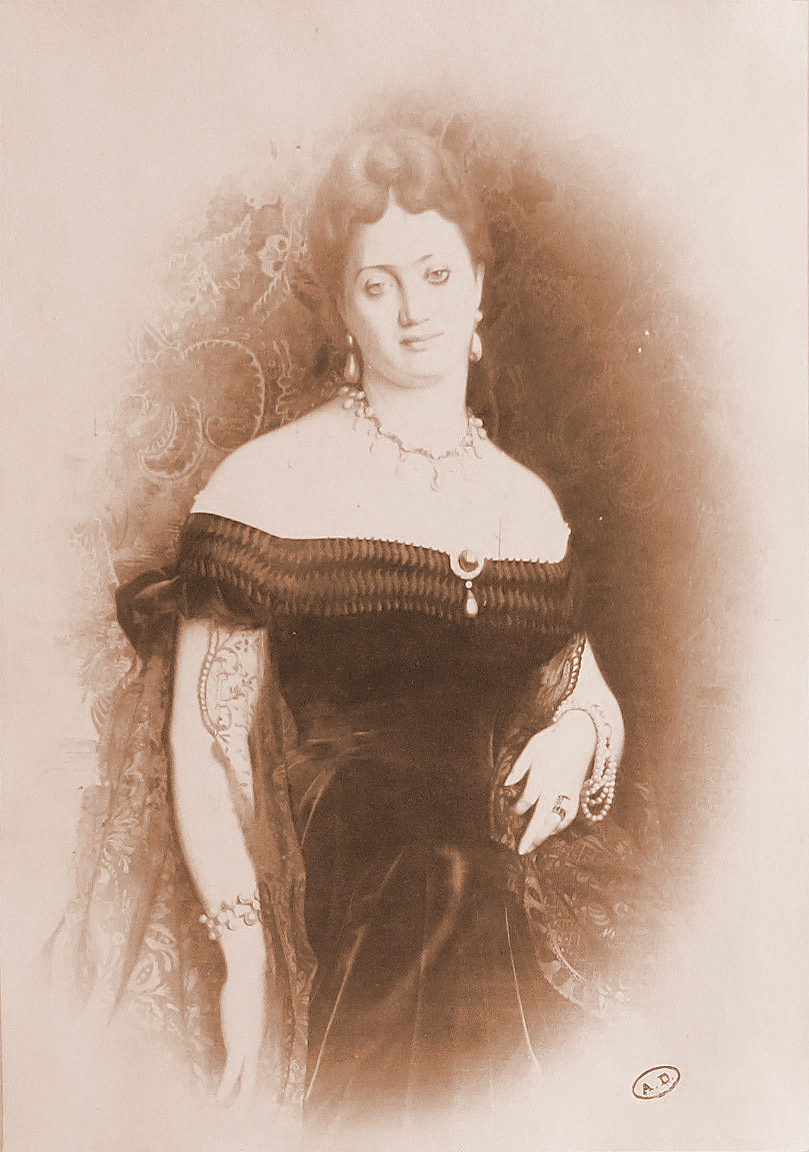
- Lachmann in the 1850s
- Born: Esther Lachmann; 7 May 1819; Moscow, Russia
- Died: 21 January 1884 (aged 64); Castle Neudeck, Germany
- Occupation: Courtesan

Esther Lachmann (French: [ɛstɛʁ laʃman]; better known as La Païva (French: [la paˈiva]); 7 May 1819 – 21 January 1884) was a French courtesan. She was also an investor, architecture patron and a jewel collector.

From modest circumstances in her native Russia, she gained fame in mid-19th-century France and married one of Europe's richest men. She maintained a literary salon out of Hôtel de la Païva, her mansion at 25 avenue des Champs-Elysées in Paris. Completed in 1866, it was regarded as exemplifying the opulent taste of the Second Empire and, since 1904, it has been the headquarters of the Travellers Club of Paris.

Lachmann also inspired the character of the promiscuous, traitorous spy Césarine ("a strange, morbid, monstrous creature") in Alexandre Dumas, fils's 1873 play La Femme de Claude.

== Early life ==
Born in Moscow, Russia, Esther Lachmann was the daughter of Martin Lachmann, a weaver, and his wife, the former Anna Amalie Klein, who were Jewish and of Polish descent.

On 11 August 1836, age 17, Lachmann married Antoine François Hyacinthe Villoing, a tailor (died Paris, June 1849). They had one son, Antoine (1837-1862), who died while he was in medical school.

== Career and personal life ==
=== Mistress of Henri Herz ===
Lachmann left Villoing shortly after her son's birth and, after travelling to Berlin, Vienna, and Istanbul, she settled in Paris, near the Église Saint-Paul-Saint-Louis and assumed the name Thérèse. Around 1840, she became the mistress of Henri Herz (1803–1888), a pianist, composer, and piano manufacturer, whom she met at Bad Ems, a fashionable spa town in Germany. The relationship gained her entry into artistic, but not aristocratic, society. Richard Wagner, Hans von Bülow, Théophile Gautier, and Emile de Girardin were all friends of the couple. Although Herz often introduced Lachmann as his wife, and she was commonly called Madame Herz, the couple never married because she already had a husband. The couple had a daughter, Henriette (c. 1847–1859), who was raised by Herz's parents.

Lachmann's avariciousness took a toll on Herz's finances, and in 1848, after their affair began, he travelled to America to pursue business opportunities, including playing concerts, where his performances were characterised by "tameness and torpidity." While he was abroad, Lachmann's spending continued, and Herz's family turned her out of the house in frustration.

=== Joining the demimonde ===
When it became clear after Herz left for America that Lachmann was destitute, one of her friends, courtesan Esther Guimond, had a solution. She took Lachmann to a fashionable milliner named Camille, who advised the Russian émigré to seek her fortune in London, where she could take advantage of that "fairy-land in which noble strangers present beautiful women with £40,000 or £50,000 a year in pin-money." Dressed in borrowed finery, Lachmann "managed to get to...Covent Garden, where she made a profitable display of her other gifts". Her first British conquest was Edward Stanley, 2nd Baron Stanley of Alderley, and she became his mistress for a time.

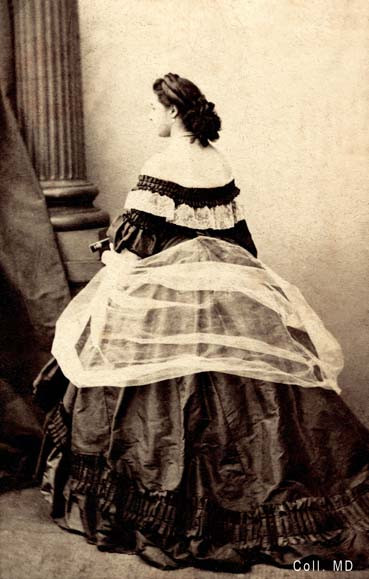
La Païva, in an 1860s portrait by Marie-Alexandre Alophe

Her affair with Lord Stanley was followed by other remunerative alliances with "other more or less well-known men of the day", including the duc de Guiche (later 10th duc de Gramont).

Cornelia Otis Skinner wrote that one of La Païva's conquests was Adolphe Gaiffe, a banker of whom she demanded 20 banknotes of 1,000 francs each—which, she stipulated, he must burn one by one during a scheduled 30 minutes of lovemaking. The banker decided to substitute counterfeit banknotes. Even so, the sight of their incineration was so unnerving that he could not accomplish his part of the tryst. Another source, however, states that the courtesan burned the notes, one by one, during her sexual congress with Gaiffe, who bet his friends he would be able to access her favours without payment—and so he did, because the money was fake.

=== Marriage to Albino de Araújo de Païva ===
In the late 1840s, at the spa at Baden, Lachmann met Albino Francisco de Araújo de Païva (1824-1873), an heir to two important Macao wholesale fortunes, each based, in part, on the opium trade. Although he was sometimes called a marquis or a viscount, Araújo was not an aristocrat and had no title, being the son of commoners, Albino Gonçalves de Araújo, a Portuguese Colonial merchant, and his wife, the former Mariana Vicência de Païva. It is possible that Araújo's spurious title came from a popular assumption that he was related to Viscount de Païva, the Portuguese ambassador to Paris in the 1850s; however, they were not related.

Two years after Lachmann's first husband died, "Pauline Thérèse Lachmann" (as the marriage banns read) and her rich Portuguese suitor were married on 5 June 1851 at a church in Passy; the writer Théophile Gautier was one of the witnesses. The day following the wedding, however, according to the memoirs of Count Horace de Viel-Castel, the new Madame de Païva gave her husband a letter ending the marriage. "You have obtained the object of your desire and have succeeded in making me your wife," she wrote. "I, on the other hand, have acquired your name, and we can cry quits. I have acted my part honestly and without disguise, and the position I aspired to I have gained; but as for you, Mons. de Païva, you are saddled with a wife of foulest repute, whom you can introduce to no society, for no one will receive her. Let us part; go back to your country; I have your name, and will stay where I am".

Leaving his wife with the £40,000 in securities that were specified in their marriage contract, as well as all the furnishings of their house in rue Rossini, Araújo decamped for Portugal. Not long after their separation, his estranged wife's fortunes greatly changed through an affair with one of Europe's richer men.

=== Marriage to Count Guido Henckel von Donnersmarck ===
La Païva, as Lachmann became known after her second marriage, crossed paths in 1852 with the 22-year-old Prussian industrialist and mining magnate Count Guido Henckel von Donnersmarck. They met at a party given by the Prussian consul in Paris, and according to Count Viel-Castel, she pursued him across Europe, pretending not to be interested in him but always managing to be in the same city at the same time and at the same social events. The young Reichsgraf was smitten, and upon meeting her again in Berlin, he offered to make La Païva his mistress and declared that, if she agreed, she would share his fortune. La Païva, who craved riches more than anything, was reported to have said, after settling down with the count, "All my wishes have come to heel, like tame dogs!"

On 16 August 1871, La Païva obtained an annulment of her marriage to Albino Francisco de Araújo de Païva, and two months later, on 28 October, Thérèse Lachmann (the name she used on the marriage certificate) wed Henckel von Donnersmarck in the Lutheran Church in Paris. The groom's gift to the bride was a triple-strand diamond necklace formerly owned by the deposed French empress Eugénie. La Païva's former husband committed suicide the following year after his fortune was depleted by his ex-wife's avarice, gambling debts, and investments gone sour.

=== Architecture patron and hostess ===
In addition to purchasing Château de Pontchartrain, near Paris, for La Païva and giving her an annuity of £80,000, Henckel von Donnersmarck financed the construction of the most ostentatious mansion in Paris: Hôtel de la Païva, located at 25 avenue des Champs-Élysées. The land was acquired on 11 July 1855, and the couple commissioned architect Pierre Manguin fr. The house was completed in 1866 by architect Henri Lefeul, and among the artisans who participated in its creation was the young Auguste Rodin, then working for the sculptor Albert Carrier-Belleuse. Among the mansion's celebrated features is a central staircase made of Algerian yellow onyx (far more expensive than marble), which matched the Donnersmarck yellow diamonds, and a tub of the same North African stone; another tub, made of silver, had three taps, one being for either milk or Champagne.

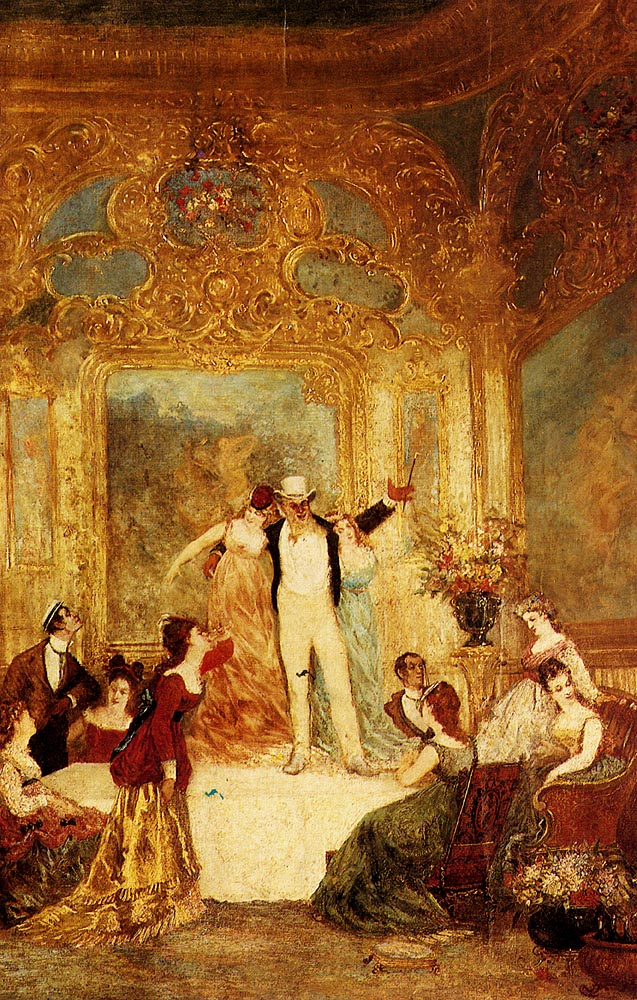
Une Soirée chez La Païva by Adolphe Joseph Thomas Monticelli, which depicts a party at Esther Lachmann's mansion in Paris.

La Païva reigned for years as a popular hostess known for her lavish open houses, teas, and dinners and salons frequented largely by well-known male writers, such as Gustave Flaubert, Émile Zola, Paul de Saint-Victor, Arsène Houssaye, and others, including the painter Eugène Delacroix. The bill of fare was so lavish that she overheard two guests discussing how much she could possibly be worth. One posited 10 million francs, at which comment La Païva scoffed "You must be mad. Ten millions? Why that would barely yield an income of 500,000 francs [per year]. Do you think I could give you peaches and ripe grapes in January on 500,000 francs a year? Why my table alone costs me more than that!"

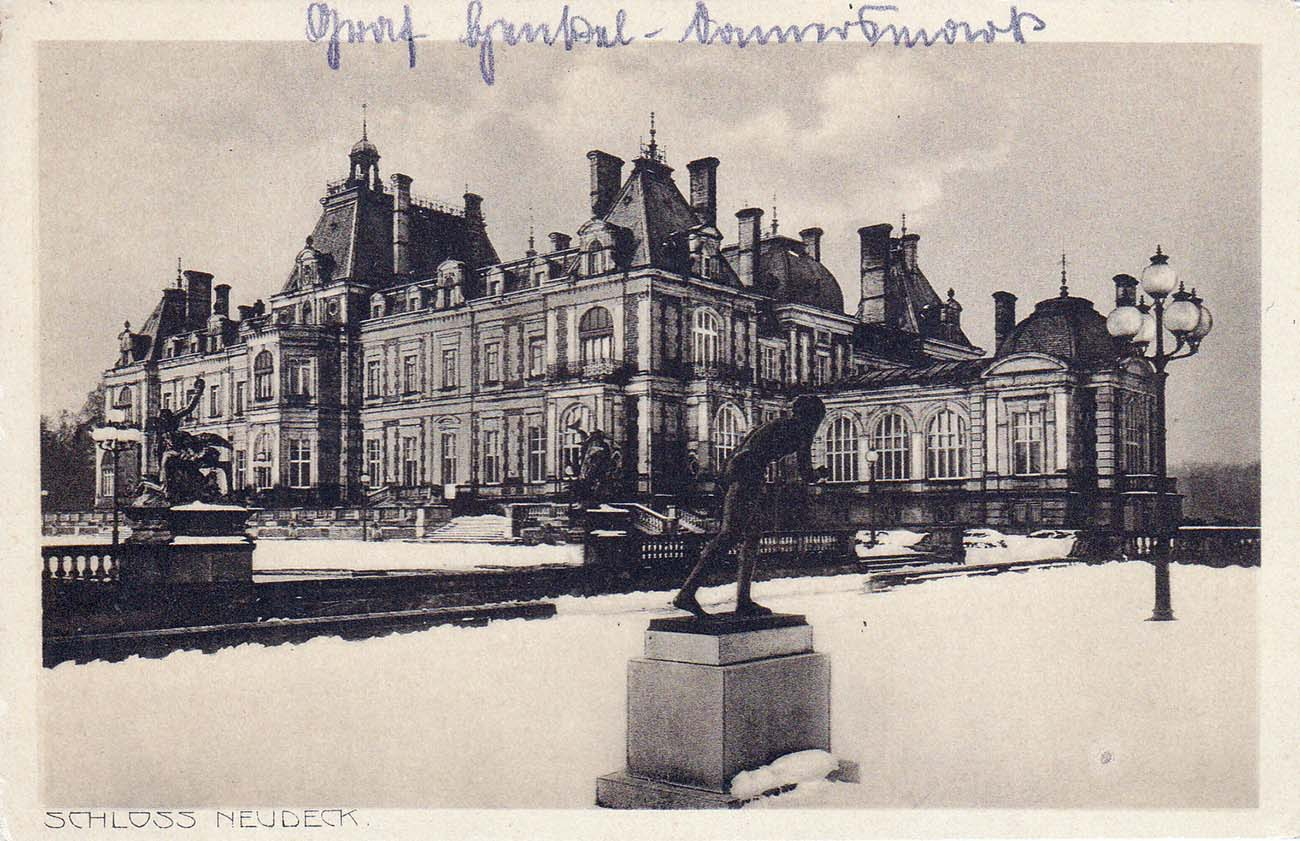
Schloss Neudeck in winter, c. 1900

The Henckel von Donnersmarcks also commissioned, in the 1870s, a country house known as Schloss Neudeck; the architect was Hector Lefeul, who had worked on Hôtel de Païva in Paris. Located on the couple's estates in Upper Silesia, Schloss Neudeck was demolished in 1961.

=== Later years ===
By the middle of the 19th century, age had eroded La Païva's physical charms, with Count Viel-Castel noting in 1857 that "she is at least forty years old, she is painted and powdered like an old tightrope walker, [and] she has slept with everyone."

A decade later, the Goncourt brothers, diarists of the Second Empire, provided the fullest eyewitness portrait of La Païva, then close to age 50. "White skin, good arms, beautiful shoulders, bare behind down to the hips, the reddish hair under her arms showing each time that she adjusted her shoulder straps; a pear-shaped nose with heavy wings and the tip thick and flattened, like a Kalmuk's nose; the mouth a straight line cutting across a face all white with rice powder. Wrinkles which, under the light, look black in the white face; and down from each side of the mouth a crease in the shape of a horseshoe meeting beneath the chin and cutting across it in a great fold bespeaking age. On the surface, the face is that of a courtezan [sic] who will not be too old for her profession when she is a hundred years old; but underneath, another face is visible from time to time, the terrible face of a painted corpse".

In the wake of France's defeat in the Franco-Prussian War in 1871, La Païva's marriage to a wealthy Prussian count coupled with her ability to circulate among the wealthy elite fuelled rumours that she was a German spy. These accusations, coupled with the hostile atmosphere in France after the war, ultimately forced her and her husband to leave the country for Silesia (present-day Poland) in 1877, where she lived for the remainder of her life.

== Death ==
Esther Lachmann, Countess Henckel von Donnersmarck, died on 21 January 1884, aged 64, at Schloss Neudeck.

According to legend, La Païva's husband preserved her body in embalming fluid but did not inter it, preferring to store it in an attic at Schloss Neudeck. It reportedly was discovered by his second wife Katharina Slepzow (1862-1929), whom he married in 1887, after she divorced Nikolay Muraviev.

== Personality ==
Lachmann reputedly had a personality so hard-bitten that she was described as the "one great courtesan who appears to have had no redeeming feature". Count Horace de Viel-Castel, a society chronicler, called her "the queen of kept women, the sovereign of her race".
