= Guido Henckel von Donnersmarck =

German businessman (1830–1916)

Guido
- Prince of Donnersmarck
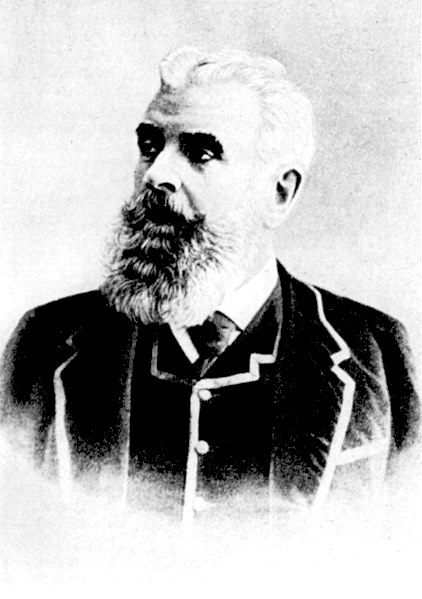
- Guido Henckel von Donnersmarck in later life
- Born: 10 August 1830; Breslau, Silesia, Kingdom of Prussia
- Died: 19 December 1916 (aged 86); Berlin, Prussia, German Empire
- Noble family: Henckel von Donnersmarck
- Spouses: Pauline Thérèse Lachmann; Katharina Slepzow
- Issue: Guido Henckel von Donnersmarck; Kraft Henckel von Donnersmarck
- Father: Karl Lazarus, Count Henckel von Donnersmarck
- Mother: Countess Julie von Bohlen

Guido Henckel, 1st Prince of Donnersmarck (German: Guido Georg Friedrich Erdmann Heinrich Adelbert Graf Henckel Fürst von Donnersmarck; born 10 August 1830 – 19 December 1916), previously Count Guido Henckel von Donnersmarck, was a German nobleman, industrial magnate, member of the House of Henckel von Donnersmarck and one of the richest men of his time. He was married in his first marriage to the famed French courtesan Esther Lachmann, known as La Païva, of Russian Jewish origin.

== Career ==
Born in Breslau, Silesia, he was the son of Karl Lazarus, Count Henckel von Donnersmarck (1772–1864) and his wife Julie, née Countess von Bohlen (1800–1866). When his older brother Karl Lazarus Graf Henckel von Donnersmarck died in 1848, his father transferred his numerous mining properties and ironworks in Silesia to Guido (such as the Szarlej mine), who soon became one of the richest men in Europe.

Henckel also had a sister, Wanda (1826–1907), who in 1843 became the second wife of Ludwig, Prince von Schönaich-Carolath (1811-1862). Friedrich von Holstein, Political Secretary to the German Foreign Office, claimed that the father of one of her sons was either a waiter or a coachman; "One must choose between the two," Holstein wrote.

Henckel lived in Paris from the late 1850s until 1877 with his mistress (later wife), Pauline Thérèse Lachmann, Marquise de Païva, known as La Païva, the most successful of 19th century French courtesans. He engaged in stock market speculations, and Otto von Bismarck sometimes found his shady contacts politically useful. In 1857, Henckel purchased for his mistress the Château de Pontchartrain in Seine-et-Oise.

Like many other Prussian business and political figures, Henckel was a reserve officer, and during the Franco-Prussian War of 1870-71 he was military governor in Metz and erstwhile governor for the to-be-annexed Département de la Lorraine (1871–1872). During the negotiations for the French war indemnity in 1871 he advised Bismarck that France could easily pay it - and indeed, the indemnity payments were completed ahead of schedule in 1873.

After Henckel's return to Germany with his wife in 1877, Bismarck occasionally entrusted him with discreet political or financial transactions. In 1884, for instance, Henckel arranged a loan for Bismarck's old friend, Prince Orlov, at that time the Russian ambassador in Berlin.

Henckel maintained a well-stocked game preserve on his estate at Neudeck in Silesia. When Kaiser Wilhelm II visited Neudeck for a shoot in January 1890, he was able to kill 550 pheasants in a single day.

As an investor in the publishing company, in 1894 Henckel was unwillingly drawn into the dispute between the editor of Kladderadatsch and Geheimrat Friedrich von Holstein of the Foreign Office. In a series of anonymous articles the journal had held up to ridicule Holstein, Alfred von Kiderlen-Wächter and Philipp zu Eulenburg. Kiderlen challenged the editor of Kladderadatsch to a duel and wounded him, but Holstein was not satisfied. He issued a similar challenge to Henckel, who maintained his innocence and declined to fight. Wilhelm II wisely refused to force Henckel to fight Holstein, for, years later, two junior officials of the Foreign Office asserted that they had been the authors of the Kladderadatsch articles.

Wilhelm II granted Henckel the title of Fürst in 1901. The same year he declined appointment as Prussian Minister of Finance upon the death of Johannes Miquel.

In the years preceding World War I Henckel was estimated to be the second-wealthiest German subject, his fortune exceeded only by that of Bertha Krupp von Bohlen und Halbach.

In 1916 he founded the Fürst Donnersmarck Foundation in Berlin with the donation of about 620 acres (2.5 km^{2}) of land and four million Goldmarks, an institution instituted to make scientific use of the experiences gained in World War I and to apply these insights in a therapeutic way, and now supporting the rehabilitation, care, and support of the physically and multiply disabled as well as research supporting that care.

== Marriages ==
His first wife was Esther Lachmann (b. Moscow, 7 May 1819 – d. Neudeck, 21 January 1884), a courtesan better known as La Païva. They married in Paris on 28 October 1871. Besides the château of Pontchartrain, Henckel gave her the famous yellow Donnersmarck Diamonds - one pear-shaped and weighing 82.4 carats (16.48 g), the other cushion-shaped and 102.5 carats (20.50 g). Horace de Viel-Castel wrote that she regularly wore some two million francs' worth of diamonds, pearls and other gems.

It was widely believed, but never proved, that La Païva and her husband were asked to leave France in 1877 on suspicion of espionage. In any case, Henckel brought his wife to live in his castle at Neudeck in Upper Silesia. He had a second estate at Hochdorf in Lower Silesia.

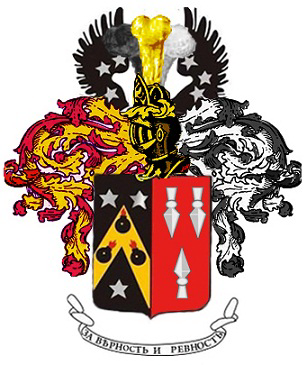
Coat of arms of the Slepzow family, part of the Russian nobility

His second wife was a Russian noblewoman, Katharina Slepzow (b. St. Petersburg, Russia, 16 February 1862 – d. Koslowagora, 10 February 1929), former wife of Nikolay Muraviev. Guido and Katharina were married at Wiesbaden on 11 May 1887. They had two children, two sons, Count Guido Otto Karl Lazarus Henckel von Donnersmarck (1888–1959) and Count Kraft Raul Paul Alfred Ludwig Guido Henckel von Donnersmarck (1890–1977).

The prince commissioned a tiara for Princess Katharina, composed of 11 rare Colombian emerald pear-shaped drops, which weigh over 500 carats and which are believed to have been in the Empress Eugénie's personal collection.

The most valuable emerald and diamond tiara to have appeared at auction in the past 30 years, was auctioned by Sotheby's for CHF 11,282,500, CHF 2 million more than the highest estimate, on May 17, 2011 in Geneva. The Donnersmarcks' jewellery collection was known to be on a par with, or even to have exceeded, those of many of the crowned heads of Europe.

== Later life ==
Henckel remained interested in political affairs even in the last years of his long life. Beginning in the winter of 1913-14 he had numerous conversations with US Ambassador James W. Gerard, to whom he described his role in the French indemnity negotiations of 1871. He expressed his long-standing support for a protective tariff on agricultural products as well as government encouragement of German manufacturing interests. Henckel proposed that Gerard should take his second son, then nearly 24, to America to see the great iron and coal districts of Pennsylvania. With the outbreak of World War I in 1914, Henckel advocated levying a war indemnity even larger than that of 1871. In 1915 he joined Fürst Hermann von Hatzfeldt (head of the German Red Cross), Bernhard Dernburg, Hans Delbrück, Adolf von Harnack and others in signing a petition opposing the annexation of Belgium.

Seeing through the military's glib propaganda and increasingly anxious about Germany's growing war debt, Henckel von Donnersmarck died in Berlin in December 1916 at the age of 86.

== Legacy ==
Following World War I, Neudeck passed to Polish sovereignty as Świerklaniec; Hochdorf remained in German territory until 1945. Katharina Fürstin Henckel von Donnersmarck died at Koslowagora, today Kozłowa Góra, neighbourhood of Piekary Śląskie, in February 1929.

Because of Prince Guido Henckel von Donnersmarck's marriage to Esther Lachman who was Jewish, and the marriage of Countess Veronika Henckel von Donnersmarck to Baron Erich von Goldschmidt-Rothschild who was Jewish, the Henckel von Donnersmarcks were included in the Semi-Gotha by the Nazis, a Government-funded anti-semitic pamphlet attacking those aristocratic families that had married into Jewish families.

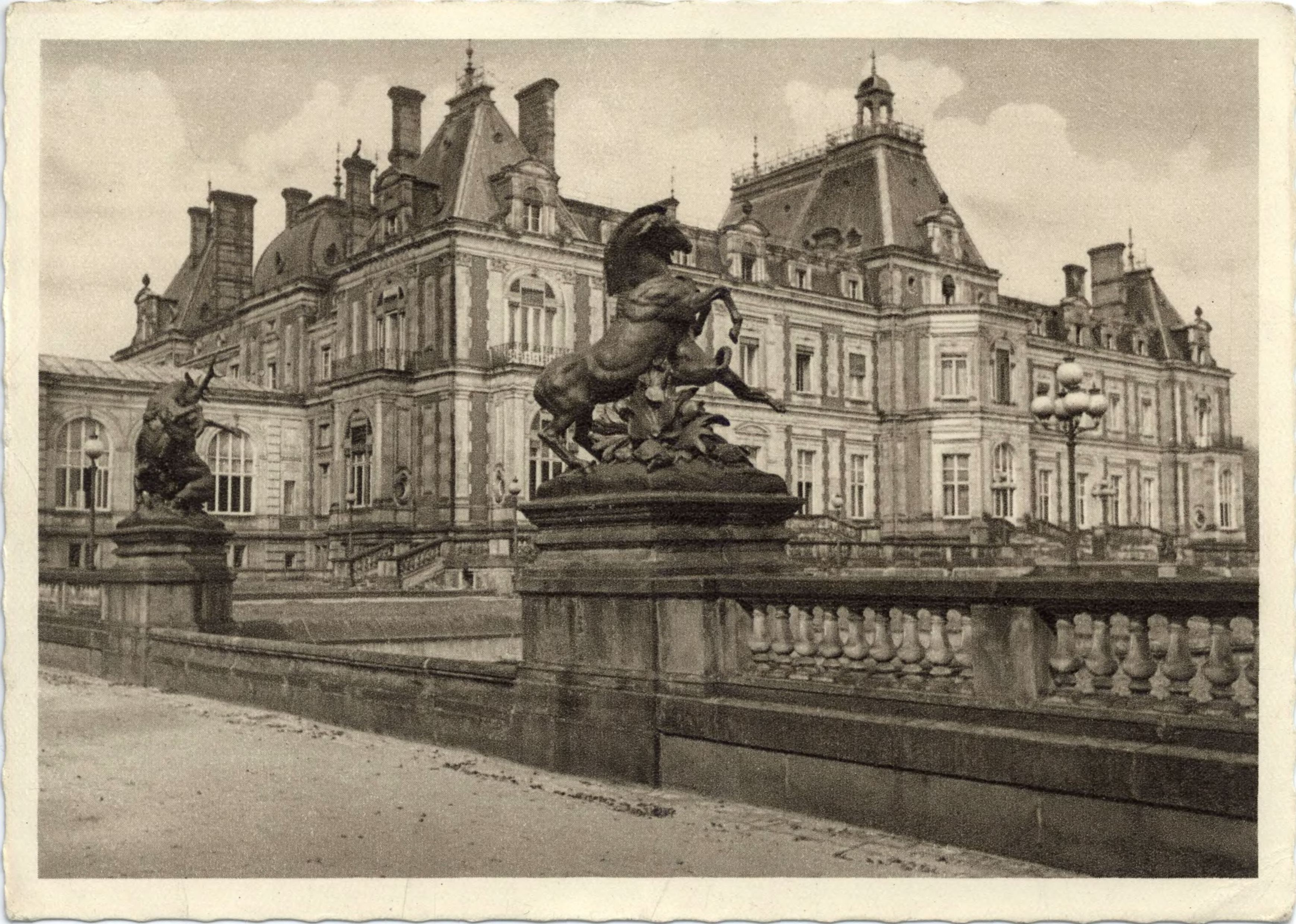
Neudeck Palace, the "Silesian Versailles", completed in 1876 by Hector Lefuel (chief architect of the Louvre Museum), destroyed as a symbol of capitalism by Stalin's troops in 1945.

With the German defeat in 1945, all people whom the Stalinist Communists considered "ethnically German" were stripped of their property in the territory where they wanted to create an "ethnic state". Among the up 14.6 million people of German ethnicity who were expelled from the Soviet occupied zones, an estimated 2.5 million met their death during what is called "flight and expulsion". Neudeck Castle was burnt down as a symbol "capitalist decadence" by the Soviets in 1945. The "Silesian Versailles" had stood for less than 70 years.

While many of the industrial methods pioneered by Prince Donnersmarck are still in use today, his most lasting legacy is his foundation in Berlin for people with disabilities. The Fürst Donnersmarck Stiftung, the Prince Donnersmarck Foundation, is currently Berlin's largest employer of people with disabilities. The Prince Donnersmarck Foundation has five central areas of activity: facilitating independent living for people with disabilities; facilitating travel for people with disabilities; funding and rewarding research into neurological rehabilitation; vocational education and professional training for people with disabilities. It runs several de-centralized fully-accessible apartment buildings and barrier-free hotels. the Board of the Foundation has been awarding the International Research Prize of the Fürst Donnersmarck-Foundation for scientific advances made in neurological rehabilitation.

== Honours ==
- Kingdom of Prussia:
  - Knight of the Wilhelm-Orden
  - Grand Cross of the Red Eagle
  - Knight of the Prussian Crown, 1st Class
  - Iron Cross (1870), 2nd Class on White Band with Black Edge
  - Knight of Justice of the Johanniter Order
- (Saxe-Coburg and Gotha) (Duchy of Saxe-Altenburg) (Saxe-Meiningen) Ernestine duchies: Grand Cross of the Saxe-Ernestine House Order

== See also ==
- Henckel von Donnersmarck family line
