= Świerklaniec =

Świerklaniec Swierklaniec
- Village
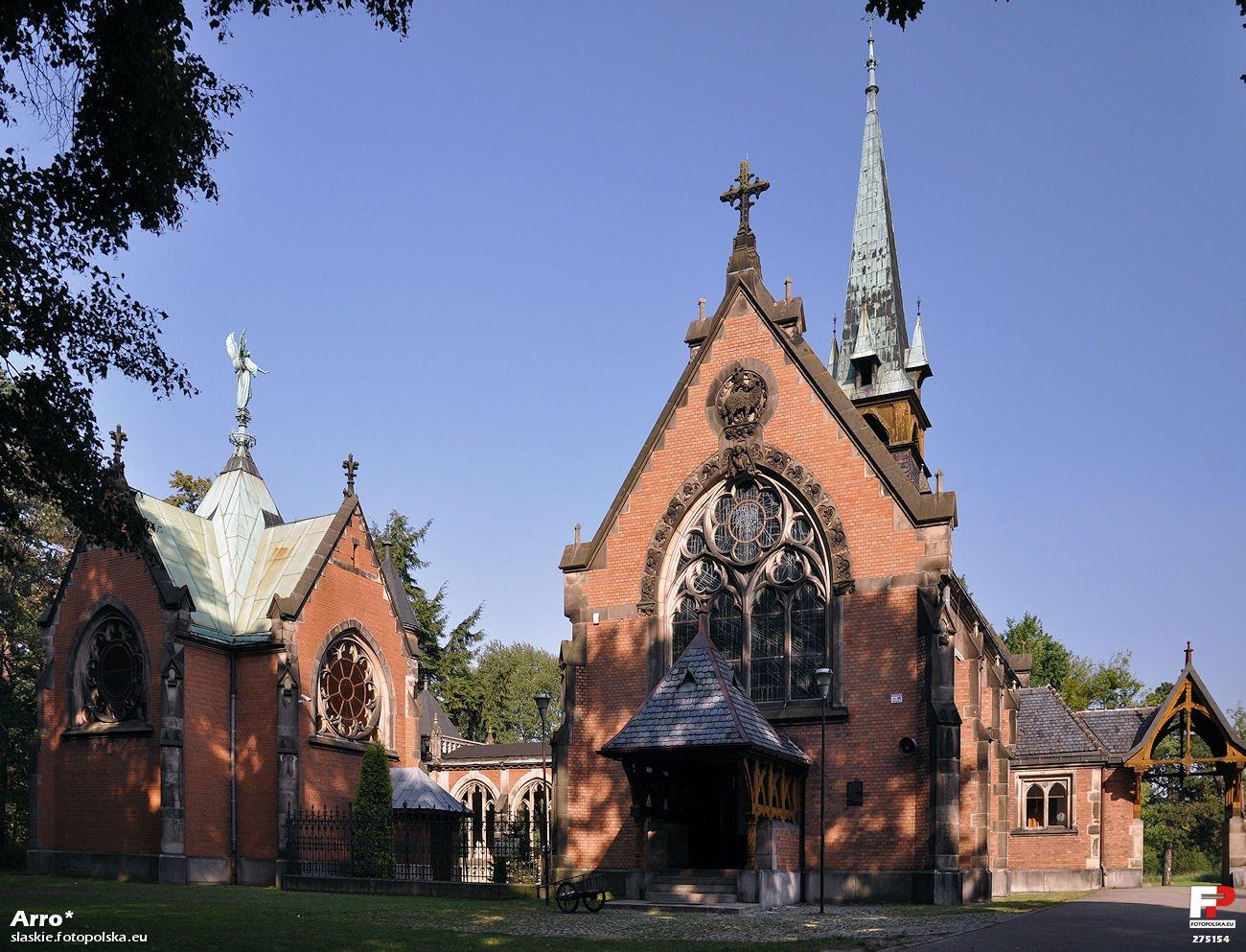
- Gothic chapel in Świerklaniec

- Location within Poland
- Coordinates: 50°26′N 18°57′E
- Country: Poland
- Voivodeship: Silesian
- Powiat: Tarnowskie Góry
- Gmina: Świerklaniec
- Area: 44.3 km^{2} (17.1 sq mi)
- Population (2021): 4,250
- Time zone: UTC+1 (CET)
  - Summer (DST): UTC+2 (CEST)
- Postal code: 42-622
- Area code: 032
- Car Plates: STA

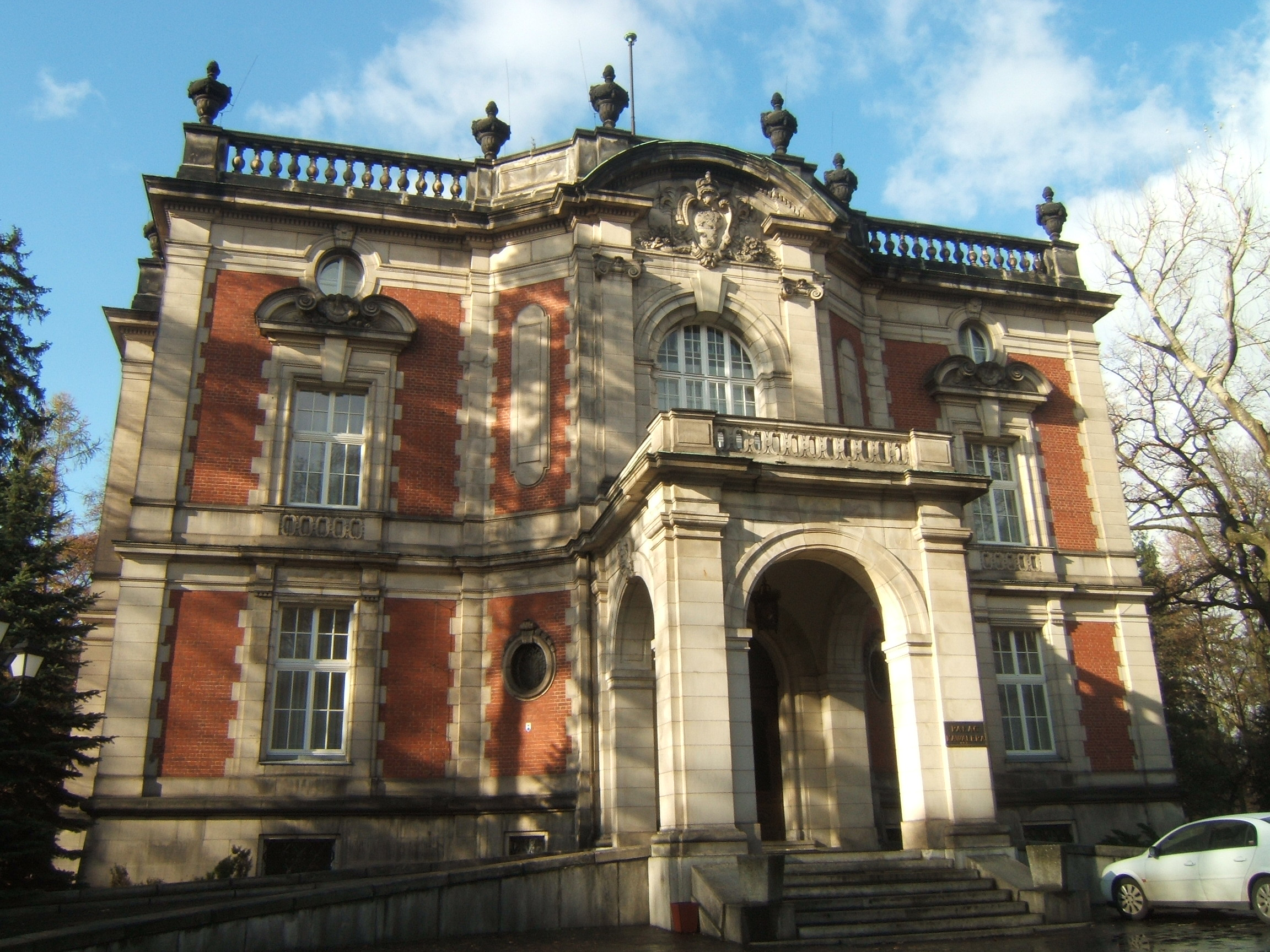
Cavalier Palace (Pałac Kawalera) in the village's landscape park.

Świerklaniec (Polish: [ɕfjɛrˈklaɲɛt͡s]; Silesian: Swierklaniec) is a village in Tarnowskie Góry County, in the Silesian Voivodeship of southwestern Poland. Formerly, from 1975 to 1998, Świerklaniec was a part of the Katowice Voivodeship.

== Geography ==
Świerklaniec lies approximately 7 km (4 mi) east of Tarnowskie Góry and 21 km (13 mi) north of the regional capital Katowice, in the historic Upper Silesia region. In the east of the municipal area, the Brynica River, a tributary of the Black Przemsza, marks the border of Silesia with Lesser Poland.

43% of the Świerklaniec gmina in which the village is located is covered with forests.

== Palaces and gardens of Świerklaniec ==
Świerklaniec was famous for the Neudeck Palace (Polish: Zamek w Świerklańcu, German: Schloss Neudeck), a former residence of the Henckel von Donnersmarck noble family, when the vast and brilliantly designed castle complex was commonly known as Upper Silesian Versailles. Both the Old and the New Castle of Świerklaniec were set ablaze by the Red Army in 1945 and demolished in 1961. The extended castle grounds, the Cavalier Palace guest house, the Donnersmarck funerary chapel and several auxiliary buildings are preserved.

=== Old Castle ===
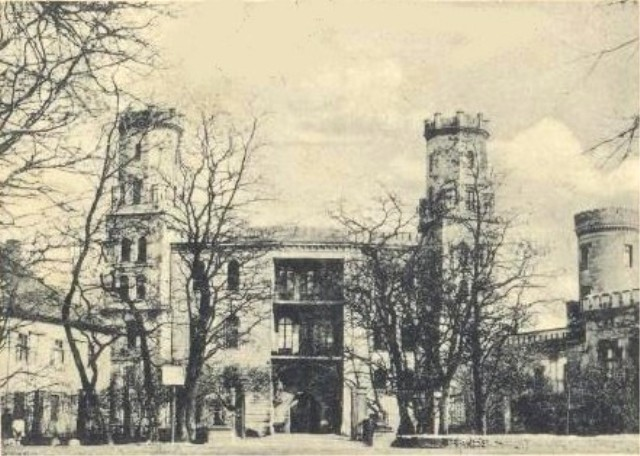
Old Castle, about 1900

A first fortress near the strategically important Brynica River on the road from Bytom to Częstochowa was erected in the 11th century at the behest of the Polish king Bolesław I Chrobry. In 1179 High Duke Casimir II the Just gave it to the Racibórz duke Mieszko IV Tanglefoot. After the Racibórz line of the Silesian Piasts had become extinct in 1336, Świerklaniec passed to the Dukes of Teschen and the castle was largely rebuilt under the rule of Duke Konrad II the Gray of Oels.

In 1477 the Swiklenczy border fortress was mentioned as part of the Silesian Duchy of Bytom. It was acquired by Duke Jan II the Good of Opole in 1498, who again rebuilt it in a Brick Gothic style. In 1526 however he had to give it in pawn, and upon his death in 1532, the premises fell to Margrave George of Brandenburg-Ansbach from the House of Hohenzollern.

When the Hohenzollern estates in Silesia were seized by the Habsburg emperor Ferdinand II after the 1620 Battle of White Mountain, he gave Świerklaniec in pawn to his money lender Lazarus I Henckel von Donnersmarck. The Donnersmarcks acquired Neudeck in 1629 and held it for more than 300 years until the end of World War II. Elevated to Reichsgrafen in 1651, the Protestant Tarnowitz-Neudeck branch of the House of Donnersmarck had the Old Castle rebuilt in a Renaissance style with extended gardens and again redesigned during the Baroque era.

=== New Castle ===
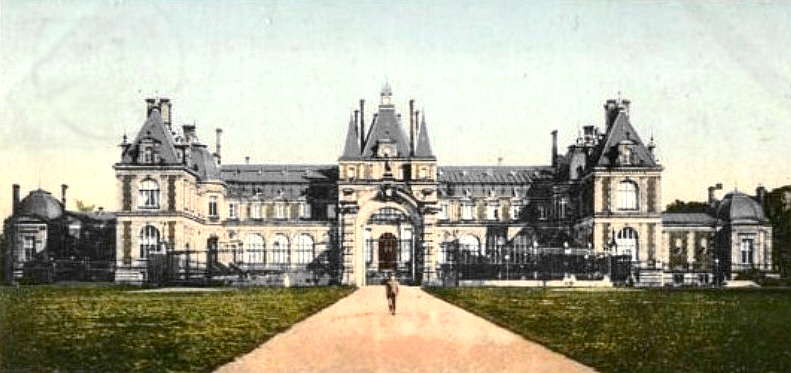
New Castle

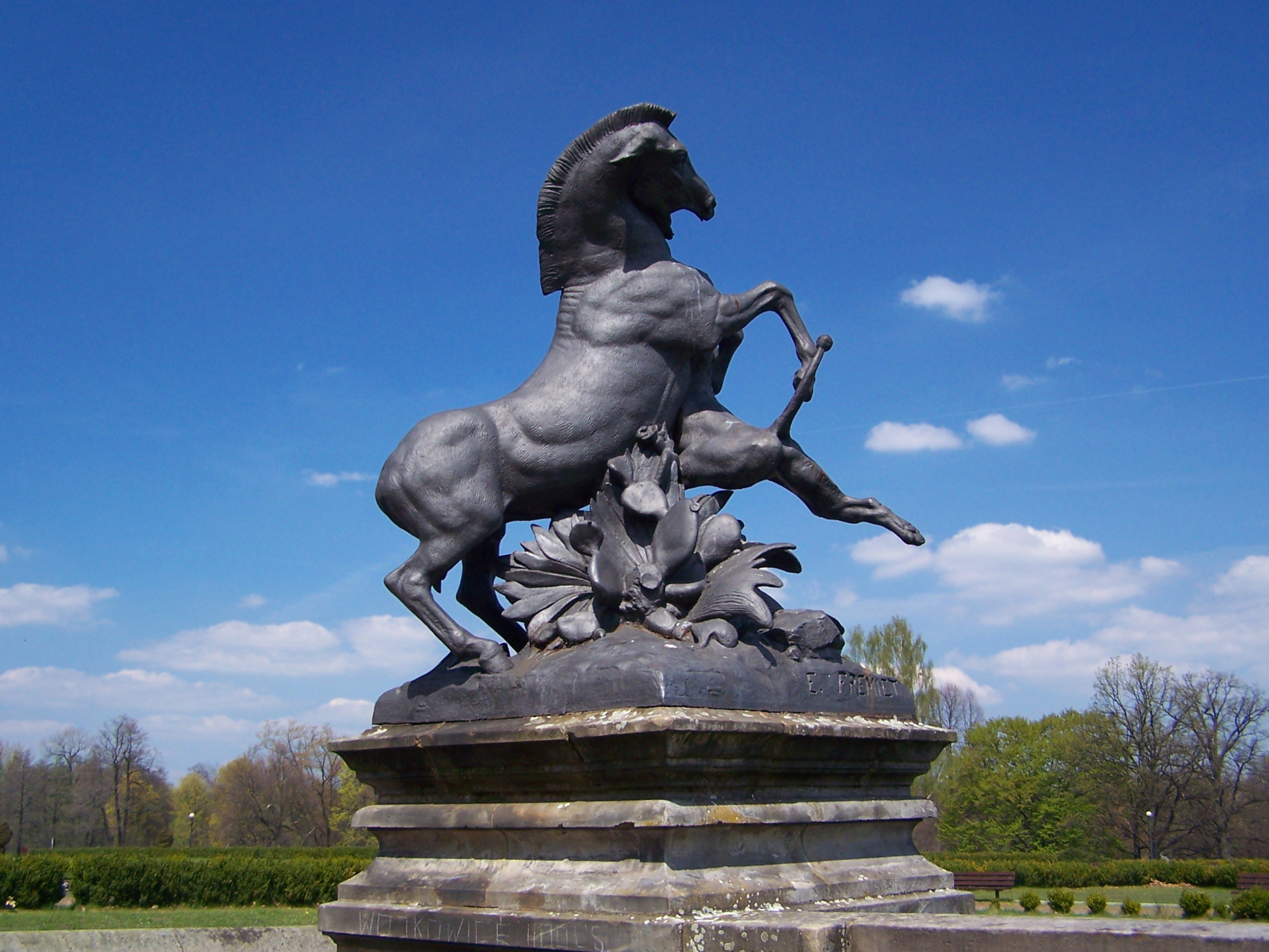
Rearing equestrian sculpture by Emmanuel Frémiet, in the garden.

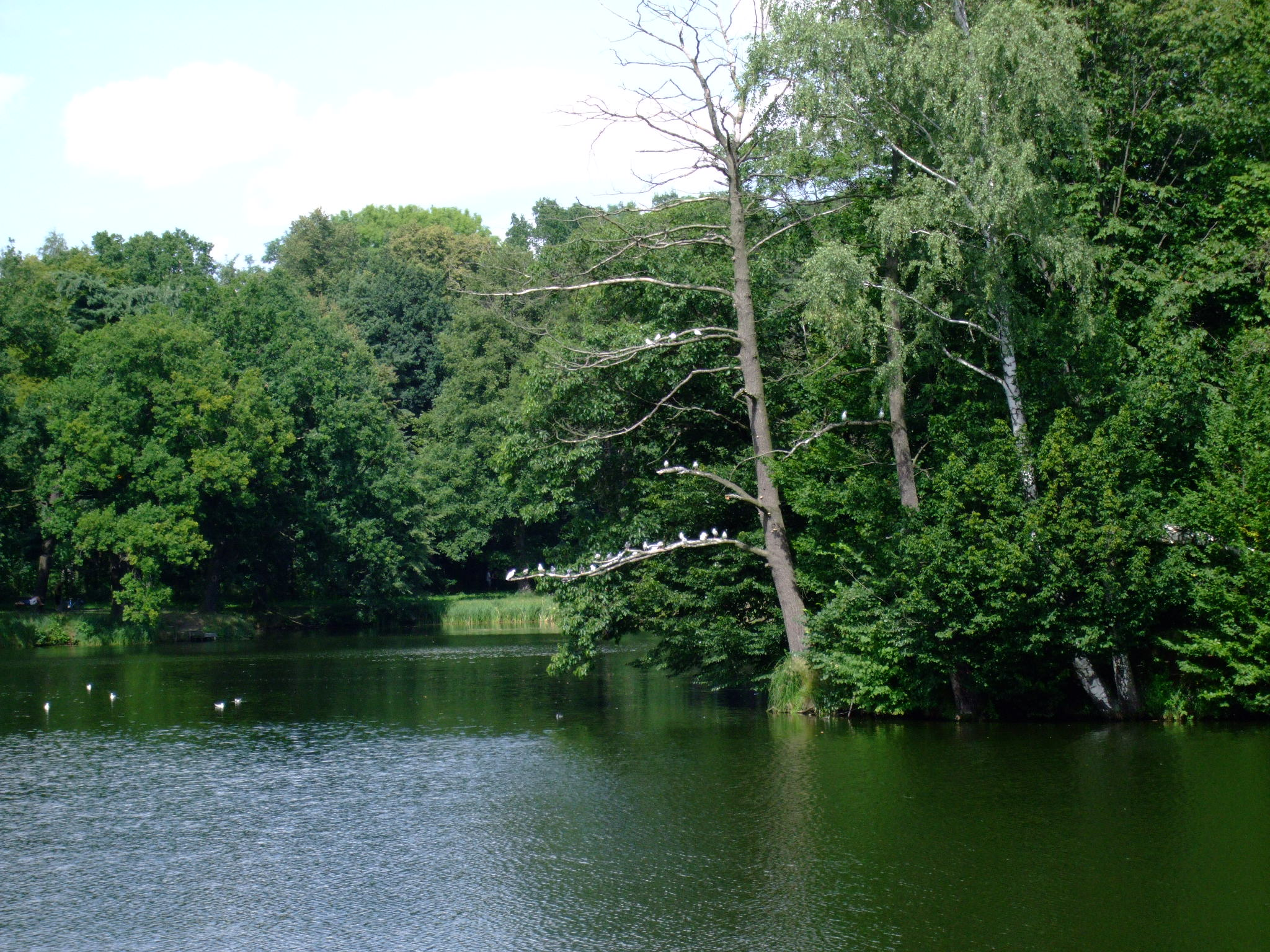
Forest woodlands, pond, and waterfowl in Świerklaniec Park

Carl Lazarus Henckel von Donnersmarck (1772–1864) largely increased the family possessions around Neudeck and had the Old Castle rebuilt in a Tudor Revival style. His son, the industrial magnate Guido Henckel von Donnersmarck (1830-1916) had the New Castle erected from 1868 onwards, modelled on his Château de Pontchartrain near Paris. The construction was finished under the management of Hector Lefuel, chief architect of the Louvre Palace, until 1876

The historic Neudeck landscape park then contained the impressive palatial complex and the extensive English landscape garden with the Cavalier Palace (Kavalierspalast) erected in 1906. Emperor Wilhelm II stayed several times at Schloss Neudeck, both for hunting and applying for credit. He elevated Guido Henckel von Donnersmarck to the noble rank of a prince (Fürst) in 1901. After World War I and the Upper Silesia plebiscite, Świerklaniec joined the Second Polish Republic. Nevertheless, the Donnersmarcks retained their possessions and from 1922 to 1937, the former Swiss president Felix Calonder, as chairman of the mixed German-Polish commission, resided at the Cavalier Palace to supervise the execution of the Upper Silesian Convention.

=== Świerklaniec Park ===
Again occupied by Nazi German troops in the course of the 1939 Invasion of Poland, the area was re-conquered by Red Army forces during the Vistula–Oder Offensive in early 1945. The Donnersmarck family fled and the castles were devastated.

The Baroque Garden à la française and landscape park, with significant statues by 19th-century artist Emmanuel Frémiet and fountains that survived, is within the former Palace's extensive forested landscape grounds. Two pairs of lion statues survived, now decorating parks in Zabrze and Gliwice, as well as a wrought iron gate currently at the Silesian Zoological Garden in the Katowice and Chorzów districts of Silesia.

The forests of the present-day public Świerklaniec Park stretch over 154 hectares (380 acres) and include oak, pine and many other species of trees. Some of the landmark heritage trees are over 120 years old.

== Notable people ==
- Dawid Jarka, Polish football player
