= Karl Josef Henckel von Donnersmarck =

Member of the Grand Ducal family of Luxembourg

Count Karl Josef
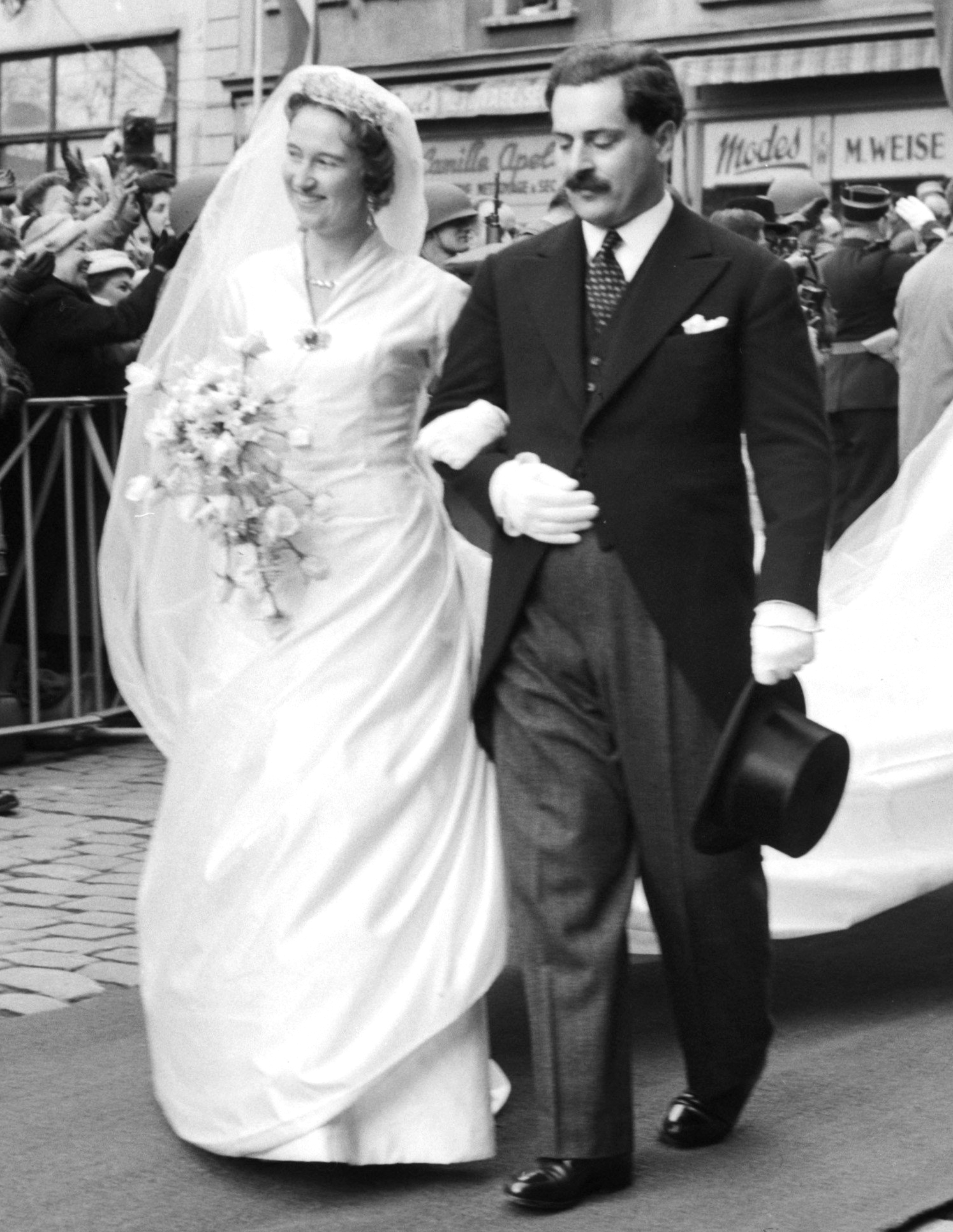
- Count Karl Josef with his wife, Princess Marie-Adélaïde, at their wedding in 1958
- Born: 7 November 1928; Romolkwitz, Prussia, Germany
- Died: 16 April 2008 (aged 79); Sliema, Malta
- Spouse: Princess Marie-Adélaïde of Luxembourg (m. 1958; died 2007) Claire Barclay-Hoess (m. 2007)
- Issue: Count Andreas; Count Félix; Count Heinrich; Charlotte, Countess Christoph Johannes von Meran
- House: Henckel von Donnersmarck
- Father: Count Lazarus V Henckel von Donnersmarck
- Mother: Countess Maria Franziska Anna Benedicta Walpurga Thekla von und zu Eltz genannt Faust von Stromberg

Count Karl Josef Henckel von Donnersmarck (7 November 1928 – 16 April 2008) was a Polish-German nobleman and, as the husband of Princess Marie-Adélaïde of Luxembourg, a member of the Grand Ducal Family of Luxembourg. The wedding of Count Karl Josef and Princess Marie-Adélaïde was the first royal wedding to be televised.

== Early life and family ==
Count Karl Josef Henckel von Donnersmarck was born on 7 November 1928 in Romolkwitz to Count Lazarus V Henckel von Donnersmarck and Countess Maria Franziska Anna Benedicta Walpurga Thekla von und zu Eltz genannt Faust von Stromberg. By birth, he was a member of the House of Henckel-Donnersmarck, a Silesian noble family. He was a grandson of Count Edwin Henckel von Donnersmarck, a great-grandson of Count Lazarus IV Henckel von Donnersmarck, and a great-great-grandson of Count Hugo Henckel von Donnersmarck. Henckel von Donnersmarck was a first cousin of Count Leo-Ferdinand Henckel von Donnersmarck.

In 1945, following World War II and the flight and expulsions of the Germans in Poland, his family lost their estates in Silesia after they were seized by the Soviet Army. They did not accept German citizenship and continued to use their Polish pre-war passports, which were legalized in London by August Zaleski, the Polish president in exile. Despite being of German nationality, Henckel von Donnersmarck and his family were confirmed as loyal citizens of the Second Republic of Poland.

== Marriage ==
On December 17, 1957, the Grand Ducal Family of Luxembourg announced the engagement of Princess Marie-Adélaïde of Luxembourg, the daughter of Charlotte, Grand Duchess of Luxembourg and Prince Felix of Bourbon-Parma, to Henckel von Donnersmarck. On 10 April 1958, he married Princess Marie-Adélaïdein in a Catholic ceremony at the Notre-Dame Cathedral, Luxembourg. The mass followed a civil ceremony at the Grand Ducal Palace, Luxembourg. Guests included Princess Beatrix and Princess Irene of the Netherlands, Princess Marie Gabrielle of Bavaria, and Prince Hugo of Bourbon-Parma. The wedding was the first royal wedding to be televised.

He and Princess Marie-Adélaïde had four children – three sons and a daughter - and eight grandchildren:

- Count Andreas Henckel von Donnersmarck (born 30 March 1959, Schloss Berg, Luxembourg) — on 17 June 1995 in Strobl, Austria, he married Princess Johanna von Hohenberg (b. 29 April 1966, Vienna, Austria), great-granddaughter of Archduke Franz Ferdinand of Austria and they have four children.
- Count Félix Henckel von Donnersmarck (2 March 1960, Schloss Berg, Luxembourg – 28 October 2007)
- Count Heinrich Henckel von Donnersmarck (born 13 November 1961, Luxembourg) — on 12 September 1998 in Schwertberg, Austria, he married Anna-Maria Merckens (born 13 February 1969, Linz, Austria) and they have one son.
- Countess Charlotte Henckel von Donnersmarck (born 4 August 1965, Fischbach, Luxembourg) — on 27 November 1999, in Wolfsberg, Carinthia, Austria, she married Count Christoph Johannes von Meran (born 26 August 1963, Innsbruck, Austria) and they have three children.

The family lived at Wolfesberg Castle in Carinthia and later settled in Switzerland.

Following his wife's death in 2007, he married Claire Regina Barclay-Hoess.

He died on 16 April 2008 in Sliema.
