= Lara Cosima Henckel von Donnersmarck =

German-American social media influencer and model

- Born: May 17, 2003 (age 23); Florida, United States
- Education: Parsons School of Design
- Occupations: Social media influencer; model
- Spouse: François Pinault Jr. (m. 2026)
- Children: 1
- Parent(s): Florian Henckel von Donnersmarck; Christiane Asschenfeldt
- Relatives: Count Leo-Ferdinand Henckel von Donnersmarck (grandfather); Anna-Maria von Berg (grandmother)
- Family: Henckel von Donnersmarck

TikTok information
- Page: lara_cosima
- Followers: 1.2M
- Last updated: September 11, 2026

Maria Lara Cosima Gräfin Henckel von Donnersmarck (born May 17, 2003), known as Lara Cosima, is a German-American model, aristocrat, socialite, and social media influencer. In 2023, she was selected to open Le Bal des Débutantes in Paris, where she was presented as a debutante. She made her runway haute couture modeling debut at Paris Fashion Week in 2025.

== Early life and family ==
Henckel von Donnersmarck was born on May 17, 2003 in Florida. Both of her parents are German – film director Count Florian Henckel von Donnersmarck and Christiane Asschenfeldt, a lawyer and the first International Executive Director of Creative Commons. Henckel von Donnersmarck grew up primarily in Los Angeles, California.

She is a member of the House of Henckel von Donnersmarck, an Austro-Hungarian noble family. She is the granddaughter of Count Leo-Ferdinand Henckel von Donnersmarck, a former president of the German division of the Sovereign Military Order of Malta, and Countess Anna-Maria von Berg, a left-wing political activist. Her granduncle, Count Gregor Henckel Donnersmarck, is a Catholic priest and the Abbot Emeritus of Heiligenkreuz Abbey. Her great-grandfather, Count Friedrich-Carl Henckel von Donnersmarck, was a Polish scholastic philosopher and landowner whose castle, Schloss Romolkwitz, was burned down by the Soviet Army during the flight and expulsion of Germans from Poland during and after World War II. She is a great-great granddaughter of the industrialist Count Edwin Henckel von Donnersmarck.

== Career ==
Beginning in the autumn of 2022, Henckel von Donnersmarck studied fashion design at Parsons School of Design in Manhattan. She spent two consecutive summers interning for Dior's haute couture division in Paris. She amassed hundreds of thousands of followers on TikTok and Instagram by creating edits of her student life in New York and Paris, as well as by posting "GRWM" videos in Paris. By December 2023, her videos had been viewed over 100 million times.

Henckel von Donnersmarck received both admiration and criticism online for her videos, showcasing a luxurious Parisian life, and was accused by some viewers of being a "nepo baby."

In 2024, she modelled in a L'Officiel editorial by Matthias Ogger and Julien Vassel.

In January 2025, Henckel von Donnersmarck made her haute couture debut as a runway model, walking the Armani Privé show "Lumières" at Paris Fashion Week and the Giorgio Armani show at Milan Fashion Week. She has often referenced Giorgio Armani as one of the designers she admired most and whose work she studied intensely at Parsons.

== Personal life ==
In November 2023, Henckel von Donnersmarck was presented to society at Le Bal des débutantes in Paris. For the occasion, she was dressed in a gown by Jean Paul Gaultier and the Couteulx floral diamond tiara designed by Guillot, made from the jewelry collection of Baron Jacques-Jean Le Couteulx and Baroness Geneviève-Sophie Le Couteulx. She was selected to open the ball, dancing a waltz with her father. She was officially escorted by Archduke Károly Konstantin von Habsburg, the son of Archduke Georg von Habsburg and Duchess Eilika of Oldenburg. The ball raised funds for the Necker-Enfants Malades Hospital and the World Central Kitchen.

In March 2026, she became engaged to François Pinault Jr., the elder son of François-Henri Pinault.

In August 2026, Henckel von Donnersmarck announced that she and Pinault married and that she gave birth to a son.
