= Henckel von Donnersmarck =

Austrian-German noble family

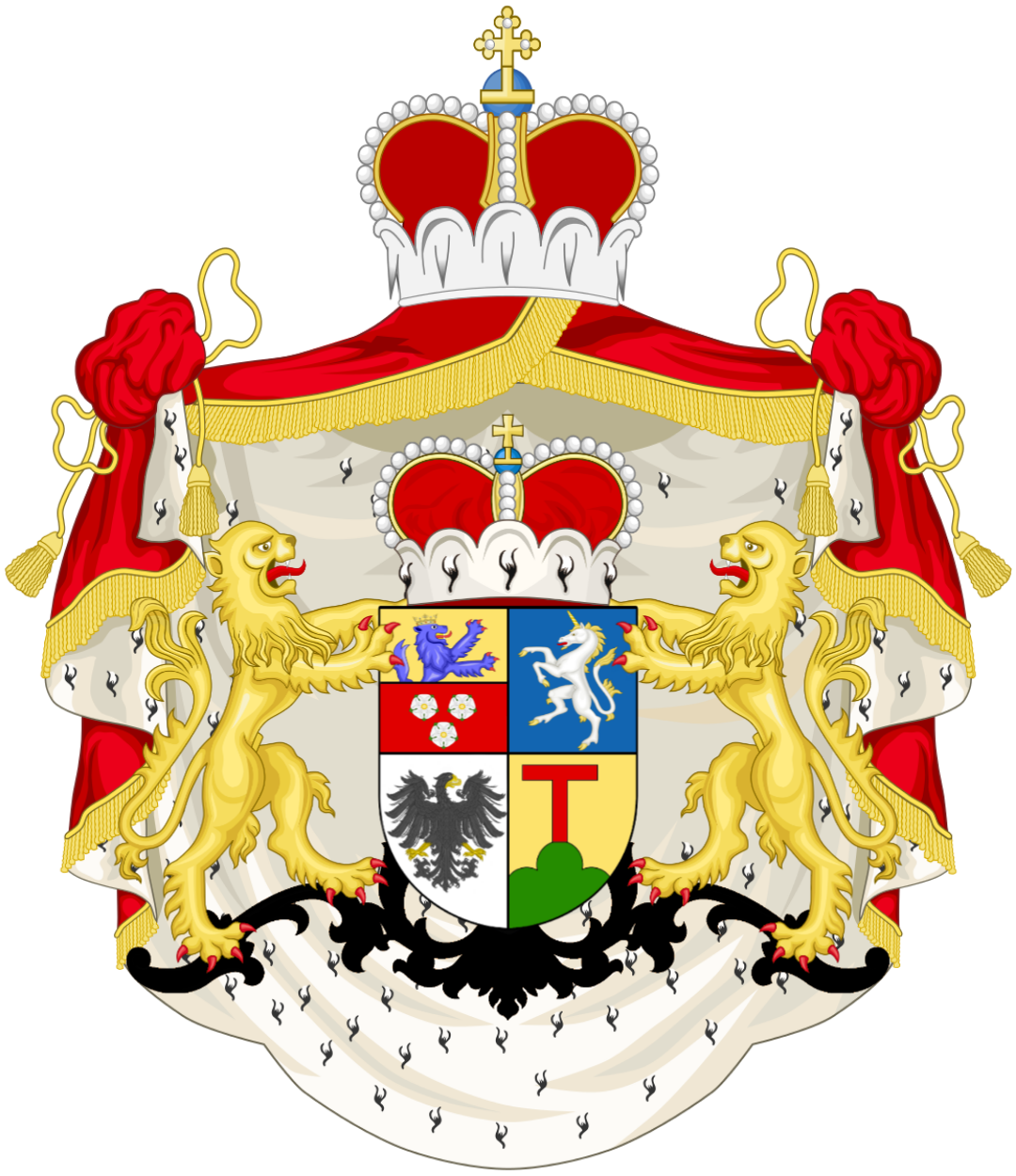
- Princely arms of the family
- Country: Germany; Austria; Poland
- Origin: Spiš, Upper Hungary (now in Slovakia)
- Founded: 14th century
- Founder: Henckel de Quintoforo
- Titles: Baron Henckel von Donnersmarck; Count Henckel von Donnersmarck; Prince von Donnersmarck
- Traditions: Catholicism; Lutheranism
- Estates: Neudeck Castle; Romolkwitz Castle; Wolfsberg Castle; Palais Henckel von Donnersmarck

The House of Henckel von Donnersmarck is an old Austro-German noble family that originated in the former region of Spiš in Upper Hungary (now in Slovakia). The founder of the family was Henckel de Quintoforo in the 14th century. The original seat of the family was in Donnersmarck (Slovak: Spišský Štvrtok), which was then within the Kingdom of Hungary but is now part of Slovakia. The family was ennobled in 1607 by Rudolf II, Holy Roman Emperor. Members of the family were granted other noble titles and privileges in 1636 by Ferdinand II, Holy Roman Emperor, in 1651 by Ferdinand Charles, Archduke of Austria, in 1661 by Leopold I, Holy Roman Emperor, and in 1901 by Wilhelm II, German Emperor. In 1531, the family moved to Silesia. They were expelled from Silesia, along with other German families, in 1945 by the Soviet Army and settled in Germany and Austria.

== History ==
Original arms of the family (1417)

In 1417, during the time of the Council of Constance, the Holy Roman Emperor and Hungarian King, Sigismund of Luxembourg, granted a coat of arms to the three brothers Peter, Jakob and Nicholas.

During the 15th and 16th centuries, John II (1481–1539), an eminent scholar, corresponded with Martin Luther, Erasmus of Rotterdam and Philipp Melanchthon. He began his career as a pastor in Levoča and Košice. Later, he stayed at the court of Louis II of Hungary and his wife, Maria of Austria. In 1531, he came to Silesia and became a canon in Breslau (Wrocław), Silesia. He died there eight years later and was buried in the local cathedral.

Lazarus Henckel (or Lazarus the Elder; 1551–1624) was a banker and mine owner, and the main financier of the Holy Roman Emperor Rudolf II's war against the Turkish Empire. Lazarus knew there was no way the Emperor would be able to repay him, but in return for his service, he was given a number of privileges. In 1607, he and his sons were ennobled with the surname von Henckel von Donnersmarck. The family seat became the castle at Neudeck (Świerklaniec).

=== Barons ===
In 1623, the family received massive lands in Silesia from Emperor Ferdinand II in the form of pledged fiefs, which they purchased from the emperor only a few years later.

Lazarus II (or Lazarus the Younger; 1573–1664), called the Lazy, was made Baron of Gfell and Vesendorff by the Habsburg emperor, Ferdinand II, at Regensburg in 1636.

=== Counts ===
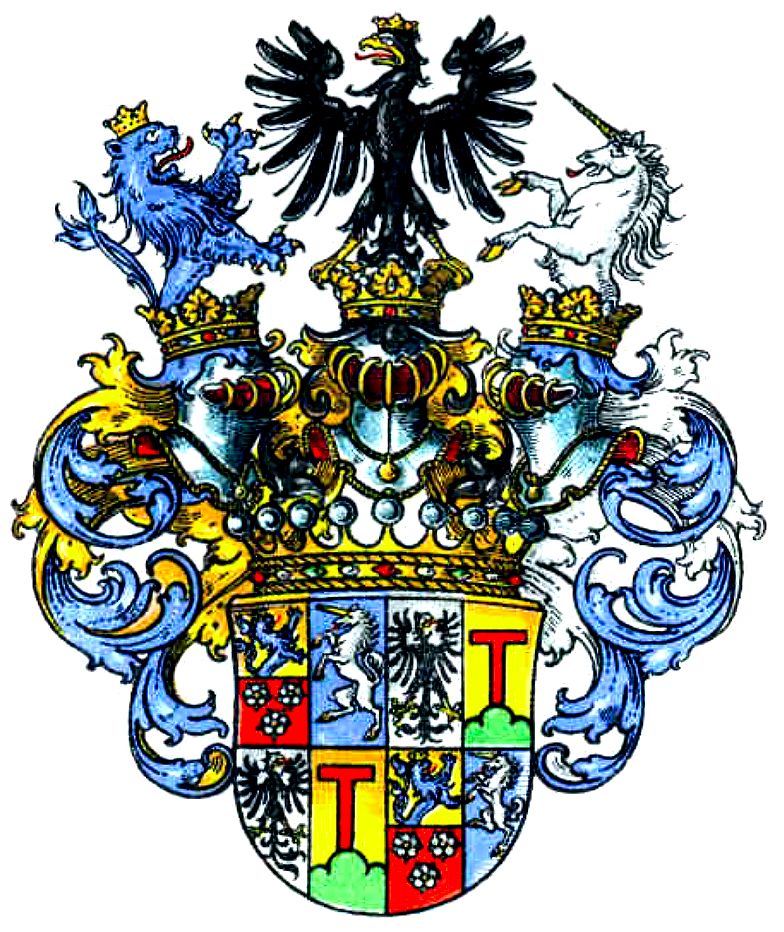
Coat of arms of the Counts Henckel von Donnersmarck

In 1651, Archduke Ferdinand Karl of the Tyrol raised Lazarus' title to that of Count in the Habsburg Hereditary Lands. He received the same title in the Kingdom of Bohemia from Emperor Leopold I in 1661, that title being hereditary for all legitimate descendants, male and female, in the male line.

In 1697, the Henckels' inheritance of a Freie Standesherrschaft (Free Lordship), under the Bohemian crown, obtained Imperial confirmation as a hereditary Fideicommis, a family trust heritable by masculine primogeniture. There were only six families that ever obtained a free lordship, a status that meant the local aristocracy, even other Counts, had to pay homage (Huldigung) to the family, and that they had patrimonial jurisdiction, meaning they were legally sovereign and made their own laws and jurisdiction.

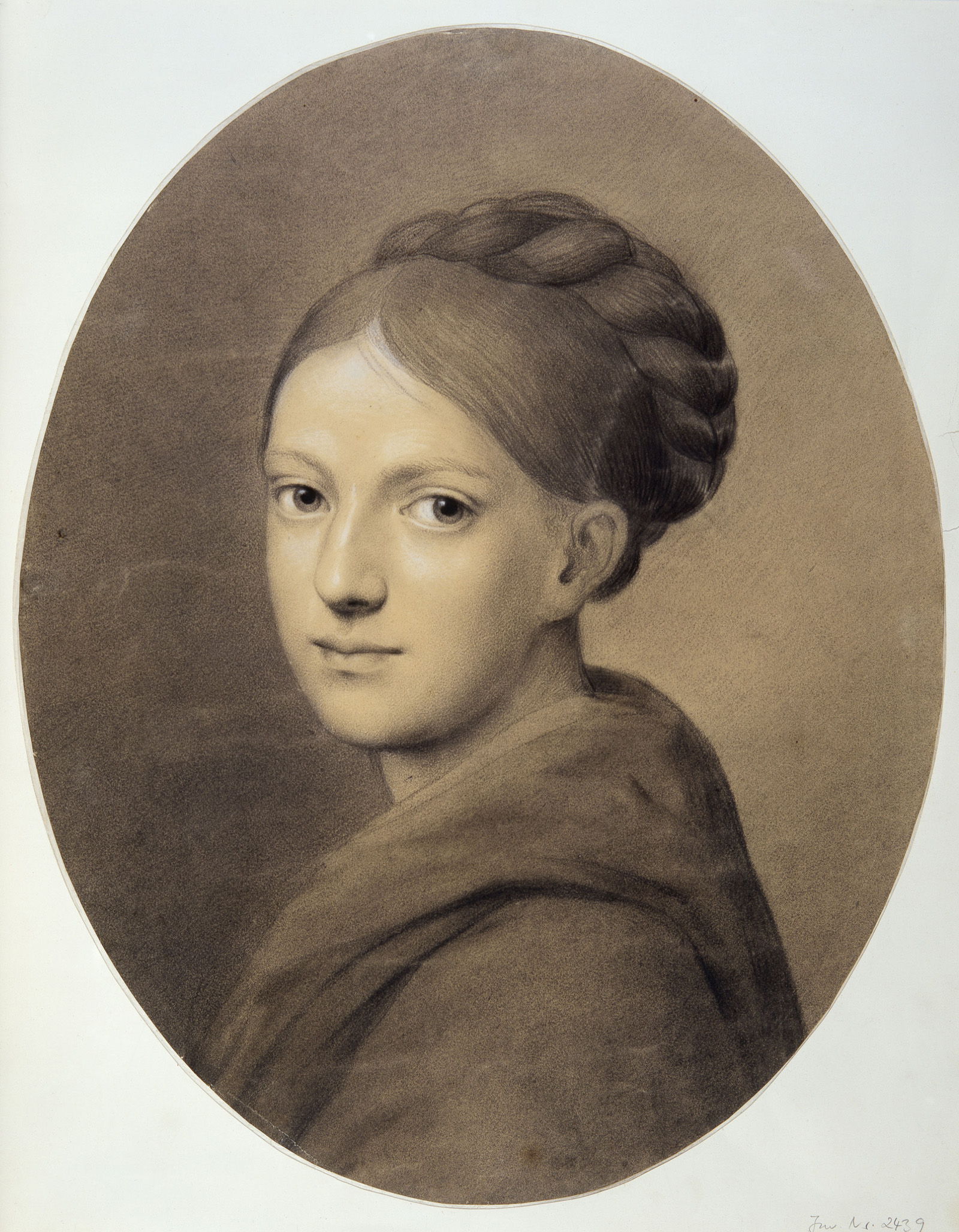
Johann Wolfgang von Goethe's beloved daughter-in-law, Ottilie, through whom the Goethe estate came to the Henckel von Donnersmarck family

When at the end of the 3rd Silesian War in 1763, Austria lost Silesia to Prussia for good, the Henckel von Donnersmarck family became Prussian on paper. In reality, however, its loyalties stayed with the Habsburg family. The head of the Henckel von Donnersmarck family was even condemned to death personally by Frederick II of Prussia for staying loyal to the Emperors of Austria and was stripped of his entire estate. After he died in exile, Frederick II restored the family's fortune to his heirs.

Count Victor Amadeus Henckel von Donnersmarck became a Prussian general and governor of Königsberg. His granddaughter Ottilie married Johann Wolfgang von Goethe's son August, which is how Goethe's estate came to the Henckel von Donnersmarck family.

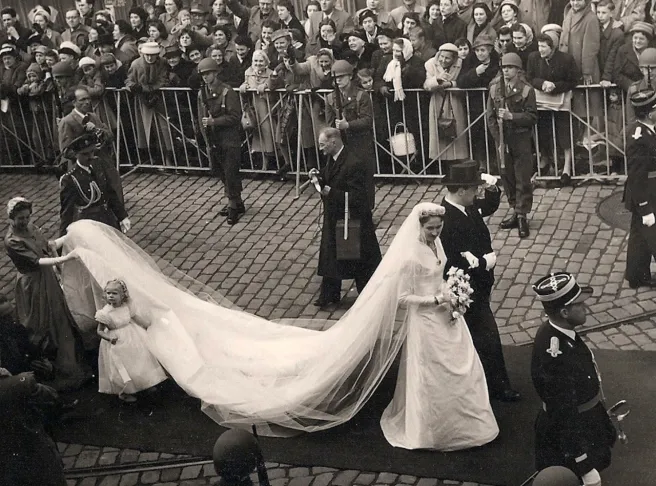
The 1958 alliance between Count Karl Josef Henckel von Donnersmarck and Princess Marie-Adelaïde of Luxembourg was the first royal wedding to be televised.

Count Wilhelm Ludwig Victor Henckel von Donnersmarck was a Prussian general who fought with Blücher to defeat Napoleon in the battle of Waterloo.

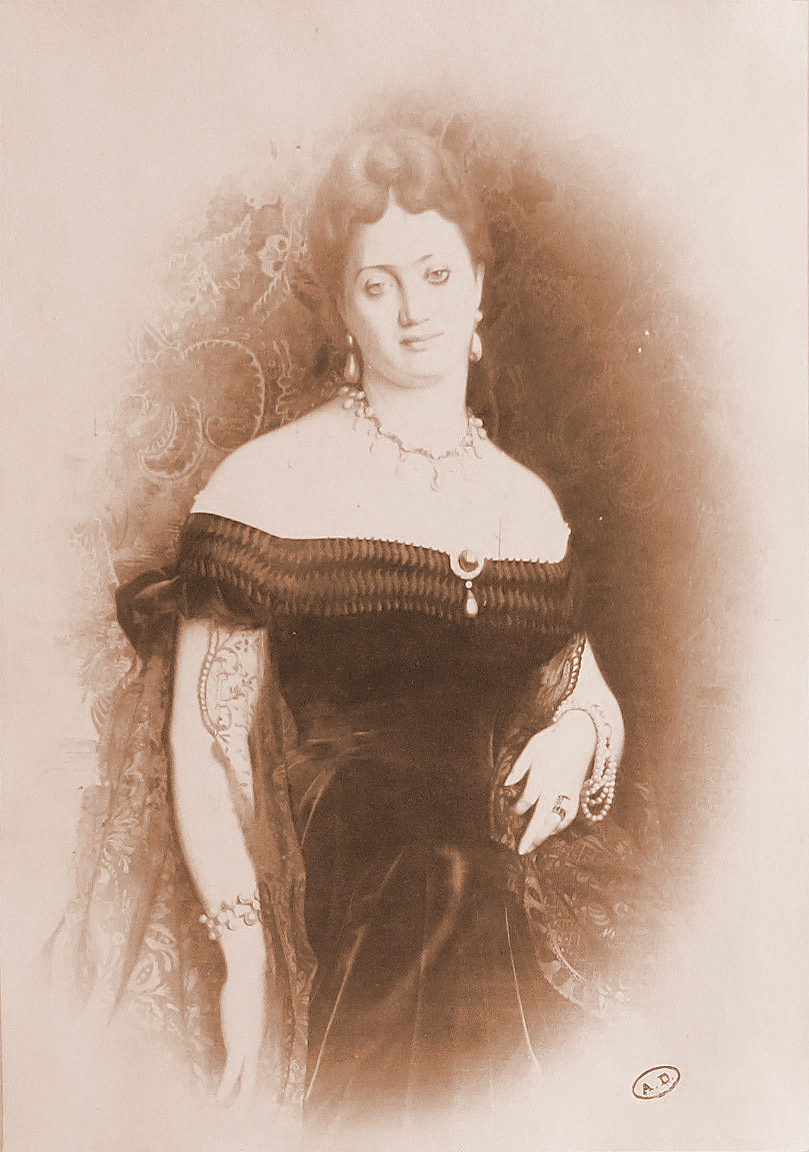
Esther Lachmann who was born in the Moscow ghetto and married Count Guido Henckel von Donnersmarck

Finally, in 1854 and 1887, the family was given seats in the Prussian Hereditary House of Lords.

Hugo Henckel von Donnersmarck (1811–1890), head of the main (Catholic) branch of the family, became one of the central figures of the 2nd Industrial Revolution, spearheading technological innovations like mild steel puddling metal factories, three-high rolling mills and soda-pulping in Germany.

At the beginning of the 20th century, Guido Henckel von Donnersmarck (made Prince in 1901, see below) was the second richest in Prussia after the Krupps. He was the first German aristocrat to expand his holdings by raising capital through offering shares in a public limited company. He invited several illustrious figures to sit on the board of his companies, among them the Duc de Morny, the brother of Emperor Napoleon III. He invested in many different countries, including Sweden, France, Italy, Poland and Russia.

In his book Face to Face with Kaiserism, American Ambassador to Germany James W. Gerard describes how Guido Henckel von Donnersmarck jeopardized his wealth and position by writing an open letter to the Kaiser beseeching him not to annex Belgium.

Because of Guido Henckel von Donnersmarck's marriage to Esther Lachman (who was Jewish), and the marriage of Countess Veronika Henckel von Donnersmarck to Baron Erich von Goldschmidt-Rothschild (who was Jewish), the Henckel von Donnersmarcks were included in the Semi-Gotha by the Nazis, a Government-funded anti-semitic pamphlet attacking those aristocratic families that had married into Jewish families.

After the Yalta Conference, Joseph Stalin and the communists claimed ownership of Silesia for Soviet-controlled Poland. Virtually all Germans, numbering over 8 million, were driven out of Silesia, including the Henckel von Donnersmarck family, who had been there continuously since 1629. They lost their fortune, but soon re-established a position of importance.

In 1958, Count Karl Josef Henckel von Donnersmarck married Princess Marie-Adélaïde, daughter of the Grand Duchess of Luxembourg and her consort, Felix of Bourbon-Parma, in what was the first televised royal wedding. In 2000, their son Count Heinrich Henckel von Donnersmarck became CEO of SIX Swiss Exchange, a company with a 2021 market cap of 2.4 trillion CHF.

In 1964, George Cukor asked Countess Veronika Henckel von Donnersmarck (married to a Rothschild) to play the fictitious Queen of Transylvania opposite Audrey Hepburn in his production of My Fair Lady. Art director Cecil Beaton stated that, although she was not an actress, the Countess was the only lady in Los Angeles with the "impeccable deportment and breeding" necessary to play a queen.

In 1997, Karl Josef's first cousin, Count Leo-Ferdinand Henckel von Donnersmarck, was elected President of the German Knights of Malta, a multi-billion dollar Catholic charity organization.

In 1999, Leo Ferdinand's brother, Count Gregor Ulrich Henckel von Donnersmarck, was elected the 67th Abbot of Stift Heiligenkreuz, the famous 12th-century Cistercian monastery in the Vienna Woods.

In 2007, Leo Ferdinand's son, film director Florian Henckel von Donnersmarck, received the Academy Award for Best Foreign Language Film for his spy drama, The Lives of Others. He went on to direct the 2010 blockbuster The Tourist with Angelina Jolie and Johnny Depp, nominated for three Golden Globes, and the 2018 epic drama Never Look Away, which was nominated for two Academy Awards. In 2013, he was named a Young Global Leader by the World Economic Forum.

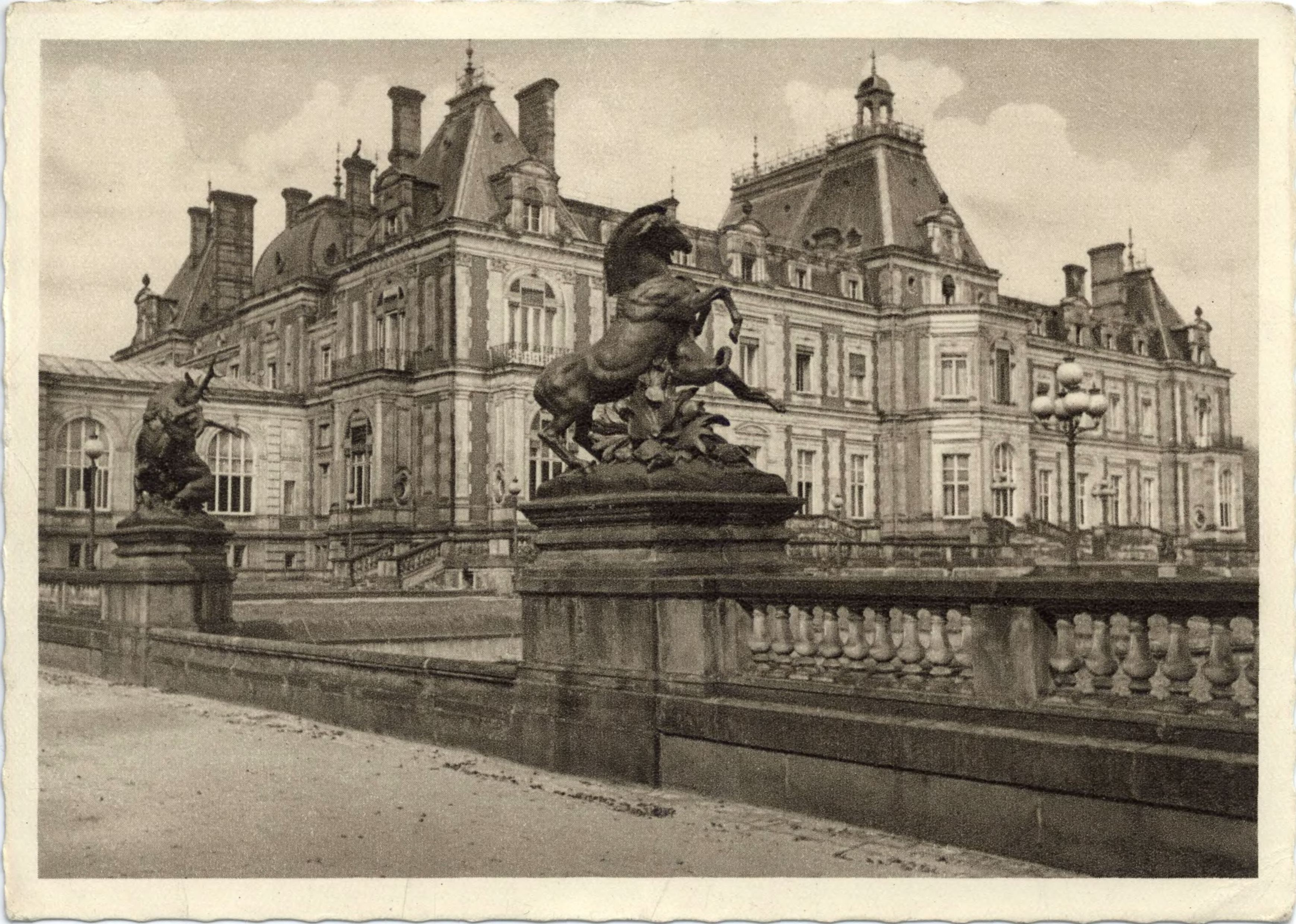
Count Guido Henckel von Donnersmarck had one of his castles rebuilt in French style to make his wife feel more at home in Silesia

=== Princes ===
On 18 January 1901, Count Guido Henckel von Donnersmarck received the Prussian title of Prince from German Emperor Wilhelm II, heritable by masculine primogeniture. He founded the Fürst Donnersmarck foundation in Berlin, currently endowed with 180 million euros, that employs over 600 people to help people with disabilities.

His great-granddaughter, Anna Henckel-Donnersmarck, is the current curator and head of Berlinale Shorts, the Berlin Festival's short film competition.

== Notable family members ==
- Lazarus I Henckel von Donnersmarck (1551–1624), banker and mining entrepreneur
- Lazarus III, Count Henckel von Donnersmarck (1729–1805), mining industrialist
- Count Elias Maximilian Henckel von Donnersmarck (1746–1827), Prussian major general
- Count Carl Lazarus Henckel von Donnersmarck (1772–1864), industrialist
- Wilhelm Ludwig Viktor, Count Henckel von Donnersmarck (1775–1849), Prussian Lieutenant-General
- Count Leo Victor Felix Henckel von Donnersmarck (1785–1861), German botanist
- Hugo, Count Henckel von Donnersmarck (1811–1890), land owner and industrialist
- Guido, Prince Henckel von Donnersmarck (1830–1916), land owner and industrialist
- Count Lazarus IV Henckel von Donnersmarck (1835–1914), landowner and member of the German Reichstag
- Count Edwin Henckel von Donnersmarck (1865–1929), industrialist, landowner, and member of the Prussian House of Representatives
- Countess Margarete Henckel von Donnersmarck (1871–1943), German salonnière and philanthropist
- Countess Katharina Eleonore Veronika Irma Luise Henckel von Donnersmarck (1902–1965), actress, played the Queen of Transylvania in My Fair Lady; married in 1925 to Baron Erich von Goldschmidt-Rothschild (1899–1987)
- Count Georg Henckel von Donnersmarck, (1902–1973), politician of the Christian Social Union of Bavaria, member of parliament
- Count Friedrich-Carl Henckel von Donnersmarck (1905–1989), scholastic philosopher
- Count Karl Josef Henckel von Donnersmarck (1928–2008), married Princess Marie Adelaide of Luxembourg (1924–2007)
- Count Augustinus Heinrich Henckel von Donnersmarck (1935–2005), Premonstratensian canon, cathedral preacher at Essen from 1975 to 1995.
- Count Leo-Ferdinand Henckel von Donnersmarck (1935–2009), President of the German Association of the Order of Malta (1997–2006)
- Count Winfried Henckel von Donnersmarck (born 1938), member of the Sovereign Council of the Sovereign Military Order of Malta in Rome.
- Abbot emeritus Gregor Henckel-Donnersmarck (Count Ulrich Maria Karl Henckel von Donnersmarck; 1943–2025), 67th Abbot of Heiligenkreuz Abbey
- Count Heinrich Henckel von Donnersmarck (born 1961) CEO of the SIX Swiss Exchange (2000 to 2008)
- Countess Anna Henckel-Donnersmarck (born 1973), filmmaker and curator
- Count Florian Henckel von Donnersmarck (born 1973), writer and director, winner of the 2007 Academy Award (Best Foreign Language Film).
- Countess Lara Cosima Henckel von Donnersmarck (born 2003), social media personality and fashion model

=== Notable members by marriage ===
- Esther Lachmann (1819–1884), French courtesan known as "La Païva", wife of Guido, Prince Henckel von Donnersmarck.
- Princess Marie Adelaide of Luxembourg (1924–2007), Luxembourgish princess
- Countess Anna-Maria von Berg (born 1940), German left-wing activist, wife of Count Leo-Ferdinand Henckel von Donnersmarck

== Bibliography ==
- Beier, Lars-Olav (2010). "Kino: Unter Genieverdacht". Der Spiegel (in German) (49). Spiegel-Verlag Rudolf Augstein: 144.
- von Ehrenkrook, Hans Friedrich; von Hueck, Walter, eds. (1997). "Henckel v. Donnersmarck". Genealogisches Handbuch des Adels, Fürstliche Häuser. Vol. XV. Limberg an der Lahn, DEU: C.A. Starke Verlag. pp. 590–592. ISBN 978-3-7980-0814-4.
