= Friedrich-Carl Henckel von Donnersmarck =

German philosopher

- Born: Maria Friedrich-Carl Lazarus Emanuel Franz Johannes Graf Henckel von Donnersmarck; 27 May 1905; Romolkwitz, Lower Silesia, German Empire
- Died: 1 September 1989 (aged 84); Klagenfurt am Wörthersee, Austria
- Resting place: Wolfsberg, Carinthia, Austria
- Occupation: philosopher
- Spouse: Countess Ann-Ilse von Zitzewitz
- Children: Leo-Ferdinand; Gregor Ulrich
- Parent(s): Count Edwin Henckel von Donnersmarck; Countess Wilhelmine Kinsky von Wchinitz und Tettau
- Family: Henckel von Donnersmarck

Count Maria Friedrich-Carl Lazarus Emanuel Franz Johannes Henckel von Donnersmarck (27 May 1905 – 1 September 1989) was a German philosopher and landowner. He specialized in Scholasticism and studied the works of Thomas Aquinas. In 1945, during the flight and expulsion of Germans from Poland during and after World War II, his castle, Schloss Romolkwitz, was burned to the ground by the Soviet Army. He and his family fled to Bavaria in West Germany before settling in Carinthia, Austria.

== Early life and family ==
Count Friedrich-Carl Henckel von Donnersmarck was born on 27 May 1905 in Romolkwitz to Count Edwin Hugo Lazarus Henckel von Donnersmarck and Countess Wilhelmine Marie Kinsky von Wchinitz und Tettau. He was a grandson of the politician Count Lazarus IV Henckel von Donnersmarck and a great-grandson of Count Hugo Henckel von Donnersmarck. He grew up as part of the Silesian nobility, as a member of the Austro-German noble family Henckel von Donnersmarck.

== Adult life ==
Henckel von Donnersmarck had a doctorate in philosophy and, as a scholastic philosopher, he specialized in studying the works and theology of Thomas Aquinas.

On 1 March 1935, Henckel von Donnersmarck married Countess Anna-Ilse von Zitzewitz in Potsdam. They had two sons, Count Leo-Ferdinand Henckel von Donnersmarck and Count Gregor Henckel von Donnersmarck.

In 1943, during World War II, Henckel von Donnersmarck was drafted to serve in the German Army. He surrendered to American troops. Henckel von Donnersmarck's properties and assets were seized by the Soviets as Silesia fell under the Iron Curtain at the end of the war. He and his family, as Silesian-Germans, were forced to leave their home due to the Soviet Army's expulsion of Germans from Poland, and became refugees in Bavaria, West Germany, where they lived for five years. They later moved to Carinthia in Austria. Their family home, Romolkwitz Castle, was burned to the ground by the Soviet Army.

== Death ==
He died on 1 September 1989 in Klagenfurt am Wörthersee, Austria. He was buried in the Henckel von Donnersmarck family mausoleum at Wolfsberg Castle in Carinthia.
