= Edwin Henckel von Donnersmarck =

German statesman and landowner

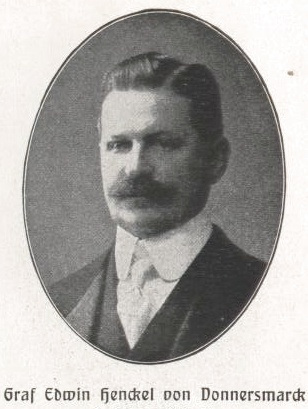
- Henckel von Donnersmarck in 1912

President of the German People's League for Polish Silesia
- In office 1925–1929

Member of the Prussian House of Representatives
- In office 1908–1918

Personal details
- Born: 23 January 1865 Romolkwitz, Silesia, Kingdom of Prussia
- Died: 23 March 1929 (aged 64) Nakło, Upper Silesia, Prussia, Germany
- Party: Centre Party
- Spouse: Countess Wilhelmine Kinsky von Wchinitz und Tettau
- Children: 5 (including Friedrich-Carl)
- Parent(s): Count Lazarus IV Henckel von Donnersmarck; Countess Maria von Schweinitz und Krain
- Occupation: politician, industrialist, landowner

Count Edwin Hugo Lazarus Henckel von Donnersmarck (23 January 1865 – 23 March 1929) was a German statesman, industrialist, and landowner. As a member of the Catholic Centre Party, he served as a member of the Prussian House of Representatives from 1908 to 1918. From 1925 to 1929, he served as President of the German People's League for Polish Silesia.

== Early life and family ==
Count Edwin Henckel von Donnersmarck was born on 23 January 1865 in Romolkwitz to Count Lazarus IV Henckel von Donnersmarck, a deputy of the Reichstag, and Countess Maria von Schweinitz und Krain. His grandfather was the German-Austrian industrialist Count Hugo Henckel von Donnersmarck. He was a member of the House of Henckel von Donnersmarck, a family of the Silesian nobility.

== Business, politics, and civic life ==
Henckel von Donnersmarck owned a manor in Romolkwitz, known as Romolkwitz Castle. At his estate in Beauthen O.S., he operated a coal and ore mining and zinc smelting businesses. He bred thoroughbred race horses owned a racing team.

From 1908 to 1918, he served in the Prussian House of Representatives, the lower house of the Landtag of Prussia, as a representative of the Centre Party. He ran in the 1912 German federal election for the Centre Party's constituency of Breslau in the Reichstag.

Prior to 1918, Henckel von Donnersmarck was the chairman of the Silesian Automobile Club, a regional section of the German Motor Sport Federation.

In 1919, he sold part of the family's estate in Radzionkau to fund the construction of houses for his employees.

From 1925 to 1929, he served as the President of the German People's League for Polish Silesia.

Henckel von Donnersmarck was deeply religious and was very involved in the Catholic Church. He served as the Vice President of the German Catholic Convention in Aachen in 1912 and in Frankfurt am Main in 1921. In 1926, he declared loyalty to the Polish Bishop of Katowice, August Hlond.

== Personal life ==
Henckel von Donnersmarck was married to Countess Wilhelmine Marie Kinsky von Wchinitz und Tettau (1869–1943), a member of the Bohemian nobility. They had five children:

- Count Friedrich-Carl Henckel von Donnersmarck (1905–1989)
- Count Lazarus Friedrich Carl Alois Anton Vinzenz Henckel von Donnersmarck (1902–1991)
- Countess Theresia Maria Gabriela Margarete (1899–1959)
- Countess Marie Alice Anna Gabriela Margarethe Henckel von Donnersmarck (1897–1971)
- Countess Sophie Josefine Margarete Henckel von Donnersmarck (1896–1972)

He is the grandfather of Count Leo-Ferdinand Henckel von Donnersmarck, the Abbot Count Gregor Henckel von Donnersmarck, and Count Karl Josef Henckel von Donnersmarck, the husband of Princess Marie-Adélaide of Luxembourg. He is the great-grandfather of the film director Count Florian Henckel von Donnersmarck and the great-great-grandfather of the social media influencer Countess Lara Cosima Henckel von Donnersmarck.

He died on 23 March 1929 in Nakło.
