= Bina Rothschild =

German actress (1902–1965)

- Born: Katharina Eleonore Veronika Irma Luise Gräfin Henckel von Donnersmarck; 8 February 1902; Berlin, German Empire
- Died: 6 October 1965 (aged 63); Mandeville Canyon, California, United States
- Noble family: Henckel von Donnersmarck (by birth); Goldschmidt-Rothschild (by marriage)
- Spouse: Baron Erich von Goldschmidt-Rothschild
- Issue: Baron Patrick von Goldschmidt-Rothschild
- Father: Count Lazarus Henckel von Donnersmarck
- Mother: Countess Vera von Kanitz
- Occupation: actress

Baroness Veronika von Goldschmidt-Rothschild (née Countess Katharina Eleonore Veronika Irma Luise Henckel von Donnersmarck; 8 February 1902 – 6 October 1965), also known as Bina Rothschild, was a German aristocrat and one-time actress known for playing the Queen of Transylvania in the 1964 musical film My Fair Lady.

== Early life and ancestry ==
Rothschild was born Countess Katharina Eleonore Veronika Irma Luise Henckel von Donnersmarck on 8 February 1902 in Berlin to Count Lazarus Herbert Patrik Valentin Henckel von Donnersmarck and Countess Vera Maria Elisabeth Marequita Maximiliane Charlotte Luise von Kanitz. She was a member of the House Henckel of Donnersmarck, an Austro-German noble family that originated in modern-day Slovakia. Her maternal grandfather, Count Georg von Kanitz, was a German military attaché in Persia during World War I.

== Marriage and issue ==
On 3 November 1925, she married Baron Erich Max Benedikt von Goldschmidt-Rothschild, the son of Baron Maximilian von Goldschmidt-Rothschild and his wife, Baroness Minna Karoline von Rothschild (1857–1903). Her husband was a member of the Goldschmidt and Rothschild banking dynasties. She gave birth to a son:

- Baron Patrick Maximilien von Goldschmidt-Rothschild, (4 August 1928 – 15 June 1993); married on 1 July 1967 in Los Angeles to Annika Roman (21 October 1928 – 5 April 2008). They have:
  - Baron Eric von Goldschmidt-Rothschild (b. 1 March 1970)
  - Baroness Kristina von Goldschmidt-Rothschild (b. 29 July 1973)

== Biography ==
Rothschild played the role of the Queen of Transylvania in the 1964 Lerner and Loewe musical film My Fair Lady, based on George Bernard Shaw's 1913 play Pygmalion. She was not trained as an actress, and was considered by Cecil Beaton, an artistic director for the film, to be the only non-actress suitable to play the role, stating that she had "impeccable deportment and breeding".

George Cukor, who directed the film, helped her prepare for the role. Beaton had originally wanted Cukor to cast Fritzi Massary for the role, but she demanded too much pay. The part then went to Rothschild, who was costumed with a triple-pronged tiara and three-tiered diamond necklace designed by Beaton.

She died on 6 October 1965 in Mandeville Canyon of California, aged 63.

== Filmography ==
| Year | Title | Role | Notes |
|---|---|---|---|
| 1964 | My Fair Lady | Queen of Transylvania | |
