= Forum of German Catholics =

Catholic lay organization in Germany

- Formation: 30 September 2000; 26 years ago
- Type: Catholic lay organization
- Legal status: active
- Headquarters: Kaufering, Bavaria; Germany
- Region served: Germany
- Chairman: Hubert Gundet
- Parent organization: Catholic Church
- Website: Forum of German Catholics

The Forum of German Catholics (German: Forum Deutscher Katholiken) is a Catholic lay organization in Germany. It was founded in 2000 in opposition to the Central Committee of German Catholics.

== History and function ==
The Forum of German Catholics was founded on 30 September 2000 in the Roman Catholic Diocese of Fulda and is based in Kaufering, Bavaria. It is an official religious organization registered with the German government. It was founded by Hubert Gienten, with the guidance of Archbishop Johannes Dyba. A conservative organization, it was formed in opposition to the Central Committee of German Catholics.

The forum, made up of members of the Catholic laity, claims to be committed to "unadulterated and unabridged" faith. It hosts congresses and other events, focused on Catholic teaching and ministry. Since 2001, the forum hosts the annual Congress on Joy of Faith, taking place in Fulda and Regensburg. In 2002, the congress was officiated by Cardinal Joseph Ratzinger. In 2007, author and former television presenter Eva Herman, served as a guest speaker at the forum's seventh annual congress; it caused some controversy, as Herman has faced accusations of promoting ideas from the Third Reich. Her involvement was criticized by Dieter Graumann, Vice President of the Central Council of Jews in Germany. Herman's involvement was also protested by Alois Rhiel, the Minister of Economics in Hesse, who resigned from his patronage of the congress. In 2009, the forum released a resolution stating that Muslims were natural allies in the "fight against a culture of death". The resolution also stated that the "systematic displacement of the Christian faith from politics and public life" was the most dangerous threat in Europe. Participants of the 2009 conference included Archbishop Jean-Claude Perisset, Bishop Gregor Maria Hanke, Bishop Friedhelm Hofmann, and Bishop Karl-Heinz Wiesemann. In 2014, the congress's opening ceremony was officiated by Cardinal Gerhard Ludwig Müller. In 2019, the forum called for Catholic women to boycott the German Catholic Women's Association, after the organization had shown support for the Mary 2.0 movement.

== Board of trustees ==
- Alois-Konstantin, 9th Prince of Löwenstein-Wertheim-Rosenberg
- Gloria, Princess of Thurn and Taxis
- Baroness Hedwig von Beverfoerde
- Cardinal Gerhard Ludwig Müller
- Cardinal Paul Josef Cordes
- Bishop Heinz Josef Algermissen
- Manfred Christ
- Edmund Dillinger
- Norbert Geis
- Gabriele Kuby
- Bernd Posselt
- Peter Gauweiler
- Werner Münch
- Anton Ziegenaus
- Lothar Roos
- Hans Alois Schieser
- Wolfgang Ockenfels
- Konrad Löw
- Andreas Laun
- Bishop Christoph Casetti
- Josef Grabmeier

=== Deceased members of the board of trustees ===
- Archduke Otto, Crown Prince of Austria
- Countess Johanna von Westphalen
- Count Leo-Ferdinand Henckel von Donnersmarck
- Count Hans von Huyn
- Cardinal Paul Augustin Mayer
- Cardinal Joachim Meisner
- Cardinal Leo Scheffczyk
- Karin Struck
- Gontard Jaster
- Aloysius Winter
