= Wilhelm Ludwig Viktor Henckel von Donnersmarck =

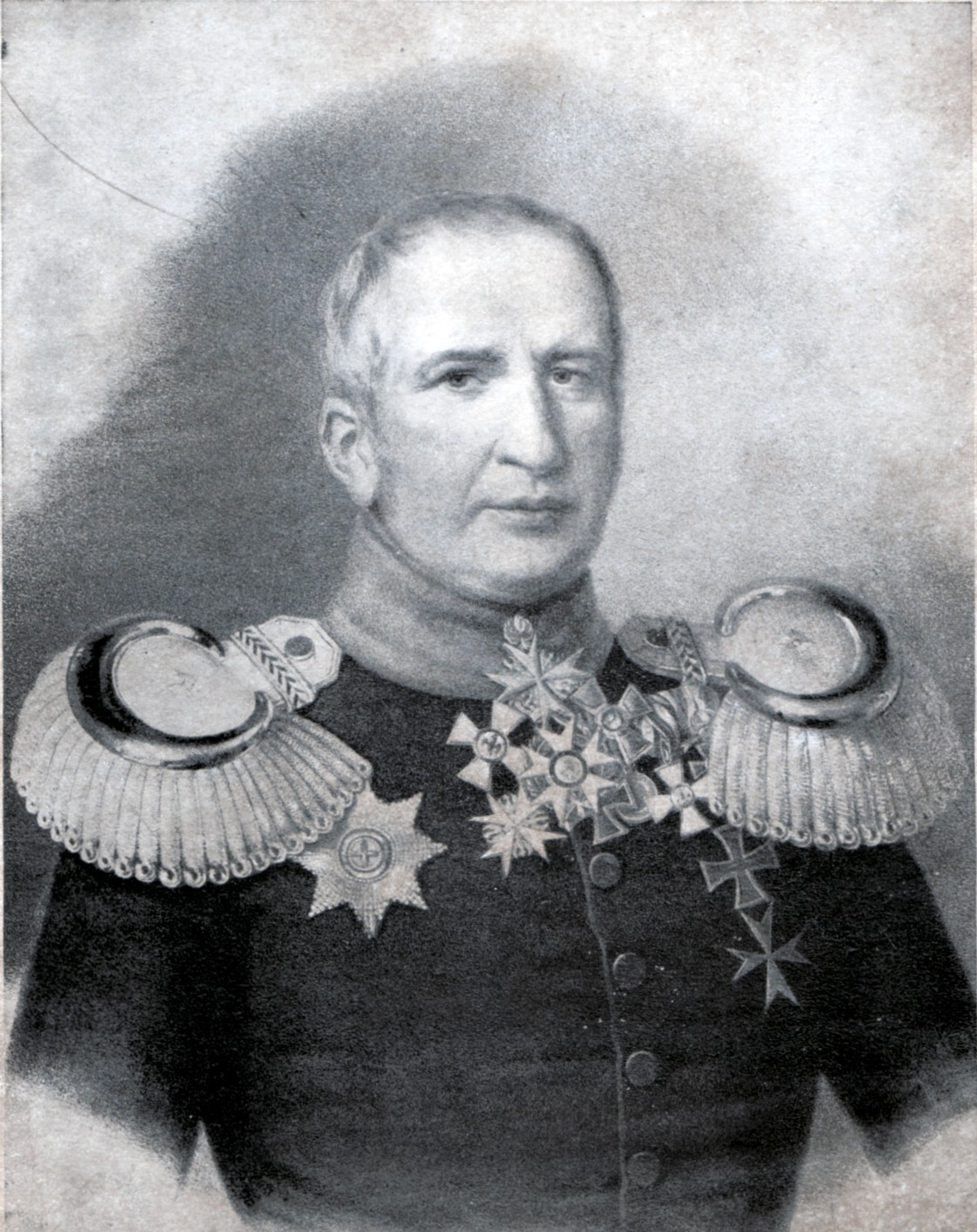
Graf Henckel von Donnersmarck.

Lieutenant-General Graf Wilhelm Ludwig Viktor Henckel von Donnersmarck (30 October 1775 in Potsdam – 24 June 1849 in Dessau) was a Prussian officer who fought in the Napoleonic Wars.

== Biography ==
Donnersmarck was born in 1775 in Königsberg. He served in the cavalry of the Prussian army from 1789 at first with line regiments and later with the Guards. He participated in all the major Prussian campaigns from 1806 to 1815 including the French Russian Campaign in 1812. He fought at the battles of Lützen, Leipzig, Ligny and Waterloo. In 1813 he was promoted to major-general, and, as he retired from the army, to lieutenant-general in 1821. He died in 1849 in Dessau.

== See also ==
- Henckel von Donnersmarck
