= Berg, Upper Bavaria =

Berg
- Municipality
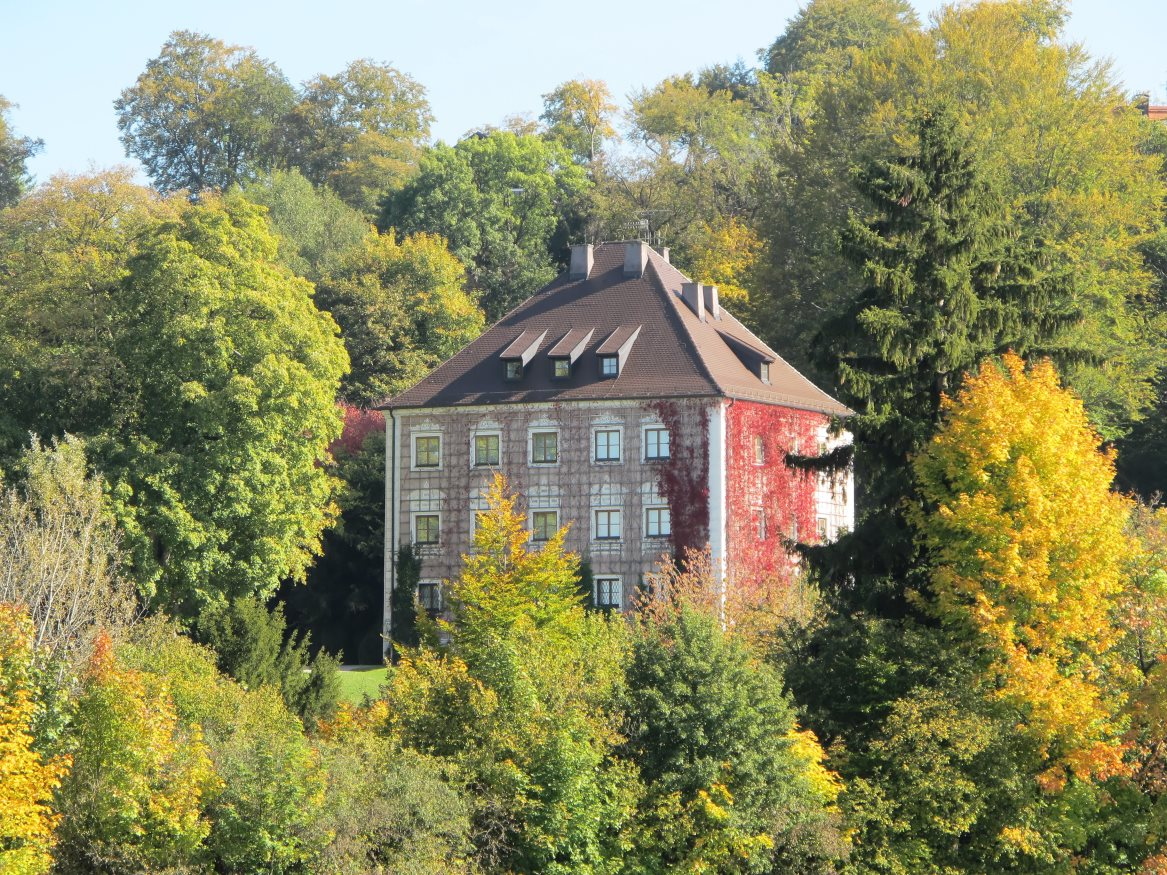
- Berg Castle

- Coat of arms

- Location of Berg within Starnberg district
- Interactive map of Berg
- Location within Germany Location within Bavaria
- Coordinates: 47°58′03″N 11°21′21″E
- Country: Germany
- State: Bavaria
- Admin. region: Oberbayern
- District: Starnberg
- Subdivisions: 14 Ortsteile

Government
  - Mayor (2020–26): Rupert Steigenberger

Area
  - Total: 36.63 km^{2} (14.14 sq mi)
- Elevation: 639 m (2,096 ft)

Population (2025-12-31)
  - Total: 8,128
  - Density: 221.9/km^{2} (574.7/sq mi)
- Time zone: UTC+01:00 (CET)
  - Summer (DST): UTC+02:00 (CEST)
- Postal codes: 82335
- Dialling codes: 08151
- Vehicle registration: STA
- Website: www.gemeinde-berg.de

Berg (German pronunciation: [bɛʁk]) is a municipality in the district of Starnberg in Bavaria, Germany, on the shore of the Starnberg Lake. It is most famous for the royal Berg Castle.

== Notable residents ==
- German baritone Dietrich Fischer-Dieskau had a home in Berg, where he died in his sleep on 18 May 2012, at age 86.
- Countess Walburga Douglas, Archduchess of Austria (b. 1958), member of the House of Habsburg, former member of the Riksdag of Sweden, lawyer, and vice-president of the Paneuropean Union
