= Anna Henckel-Donnersmarck =

German filmmaker and curator

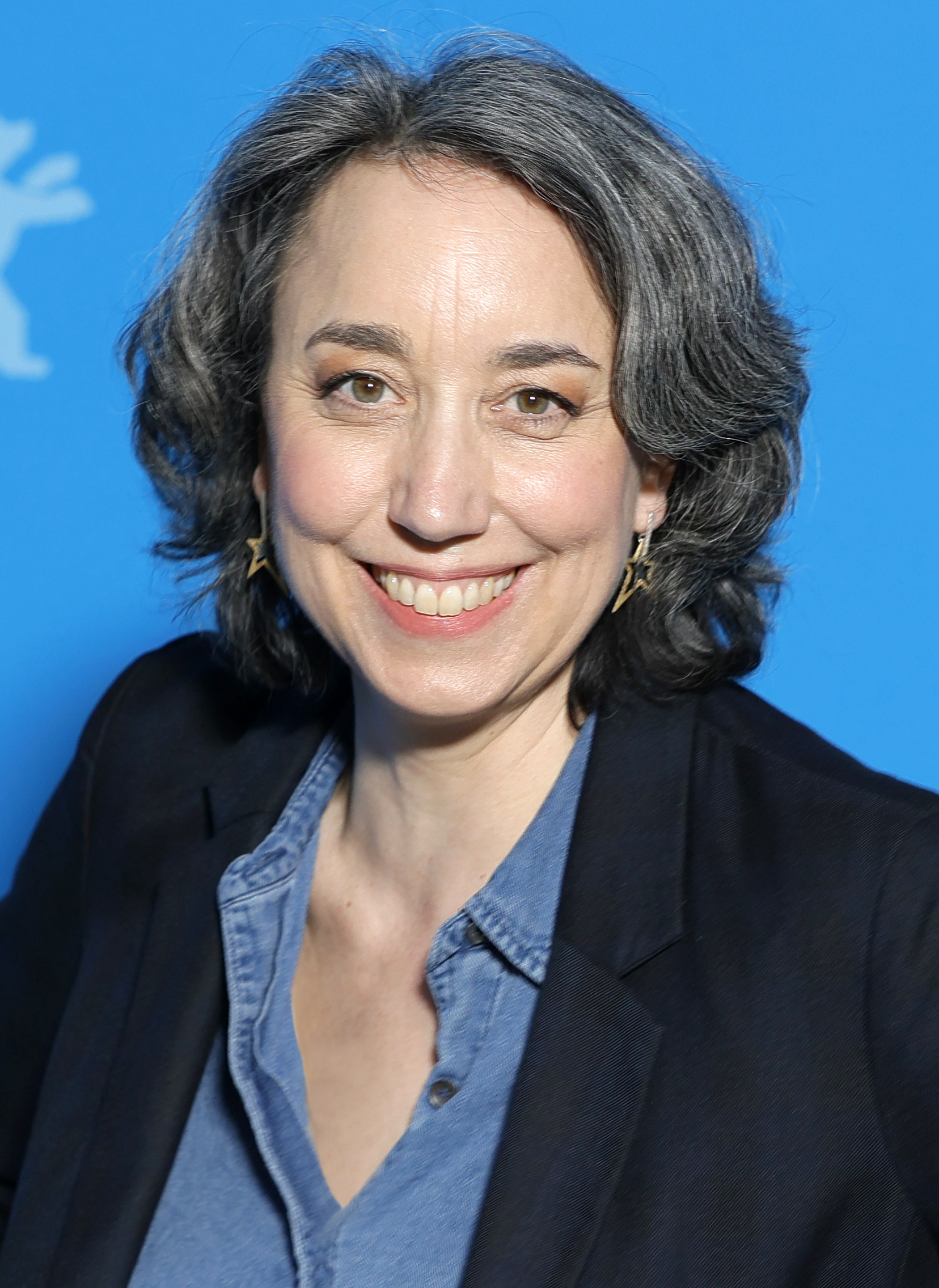
- Henckel-Donnersmarck in 2024
- Born: Anna Sarah Maria Brigitte Elisabeth Lily Gräfin Henckel von Donnersmarck; 6 March 1973 (age 52); Frankfurt am Main, Hesse, Germany
- Education: Camberwell College of Arts; Film Academy Baden-Württemberg
- Occupation(s): Filmmaker, curator
- Parent(s): Guidotto, 4th Prince of Donnersmarck; Gerlinde Urban
- Relatives: Henckel von Donnersmarck (family)
- Website: annahd.net

Countess Anna Sarah Maria Brigitte Elisabeth Lily Henckel von Donnersmarck (born 6 March 1973), known professionally as Anna Henckel-Donnersmarck, is a German filmmaker and film curator. Since 2019, she has been the curator of the Berlinale Shorts competition of the Berlin International Film Festival.

== Early life and education ==
Henckel-Donnersmarck was born on 6 March 1973 in Frankfurt. She is a member of the House of Henckel von Donnersmarck, an Austro-German noble family that once owned large estates in Silesia. Her father is the chairman of the Prince Donnersmarck Foundation. Her great-grandfather was Guido Henckel, 1st Prince of Donnersmarck. Henckel-Donnersmarck is related to German-American film director Florian Henckel von Donnersmarck.

She grew up in Indonesia, Japan, the United Kingdom, and Bavaria. Henckel-Donnersmarck attended Camberwell College of Arts in London and the Film Academy Baden-Württemberg in Ludwigsburg.

== Career ==
Henckel-Donnersmarck worked as a film programmer and presenter at Stuttgarter Filmwinter, Kasseler Dokfest, Zebra Poetry Film Festival, Pictoplasma, Internationales Animationfilm-Festival Stuttgart, the Szpilman Award, and Filmfest Dresden.

She designs short film video installations for exhibitions and concerts and worked as a lecturer on film theory and video practice.

From 2007 to 2019, Henckel-Donnersmarck served as a member of the Berlin International Film Festival's Berlinale Shorts selection committee. In June 2019, she succeeded Maike Mia Höhne as the curator of the Berlinale Shorts competition. She began her term as curator in 2020.
