= John Simon White =

American opera director

John Simon White (March 4, 1910 — November 6, 2001), born Schwarzkopf, was an Austrian-American opera director, vocal coach, and stage manager. He served as the managing director of the New York City Opera.

== Biography ==
White was born John Schwarzkopf on March 4, 1910 in Vienna. He was from a Jewish family.

He was the managing director of the New York City Opera from 1970 to1980. White befriended Countess Anna-Maria Henckel von Donnersmarck in New York and acted as a mentor to her son, Florian Henckel von Donnersmarck.

He died on November 6, 2001 in Sarasota, Florida.
