= Berg Palace (Bavaria) =

Residence of the Duke of Bavaria at Lake Starnberg, Germany

Coordinates: 47.9702°N 11.3510°E

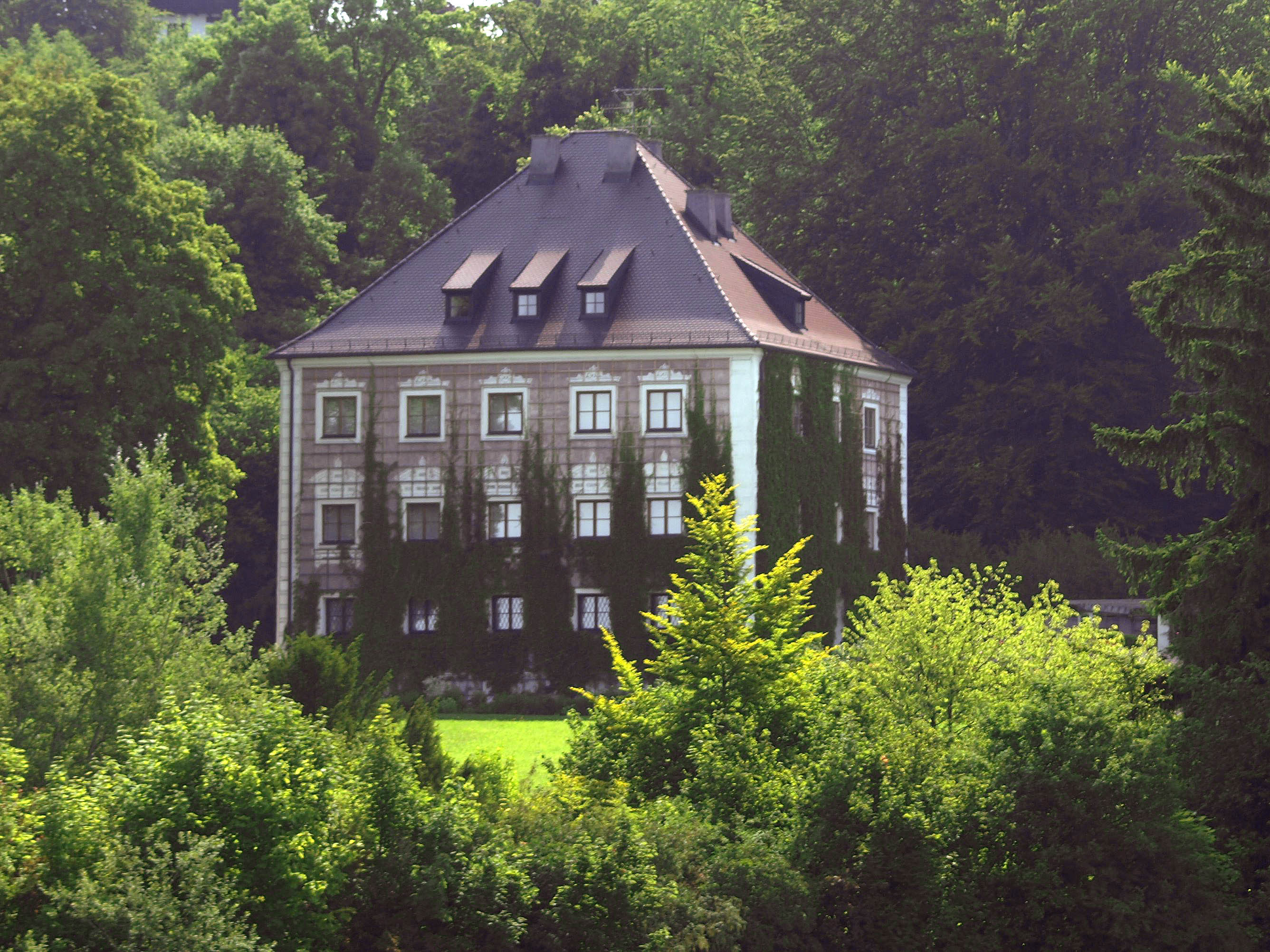
Berg Palace as reconstructed after World War II to its 17th-century appearance, viewed from Lake Starnberg

Berg Palace (German: Schloss Berg) is a manor house situated on the east bank of Lake Starnberg in the village of Berg in Upper Bavaria, Germany. The site became widely known as the last residence of King Ludwig II of Bavaria and location of his disputed death. Today, it serves as residence of Franz, Duke of Bavaria, head of the house of Wittelsbach.

== History ==
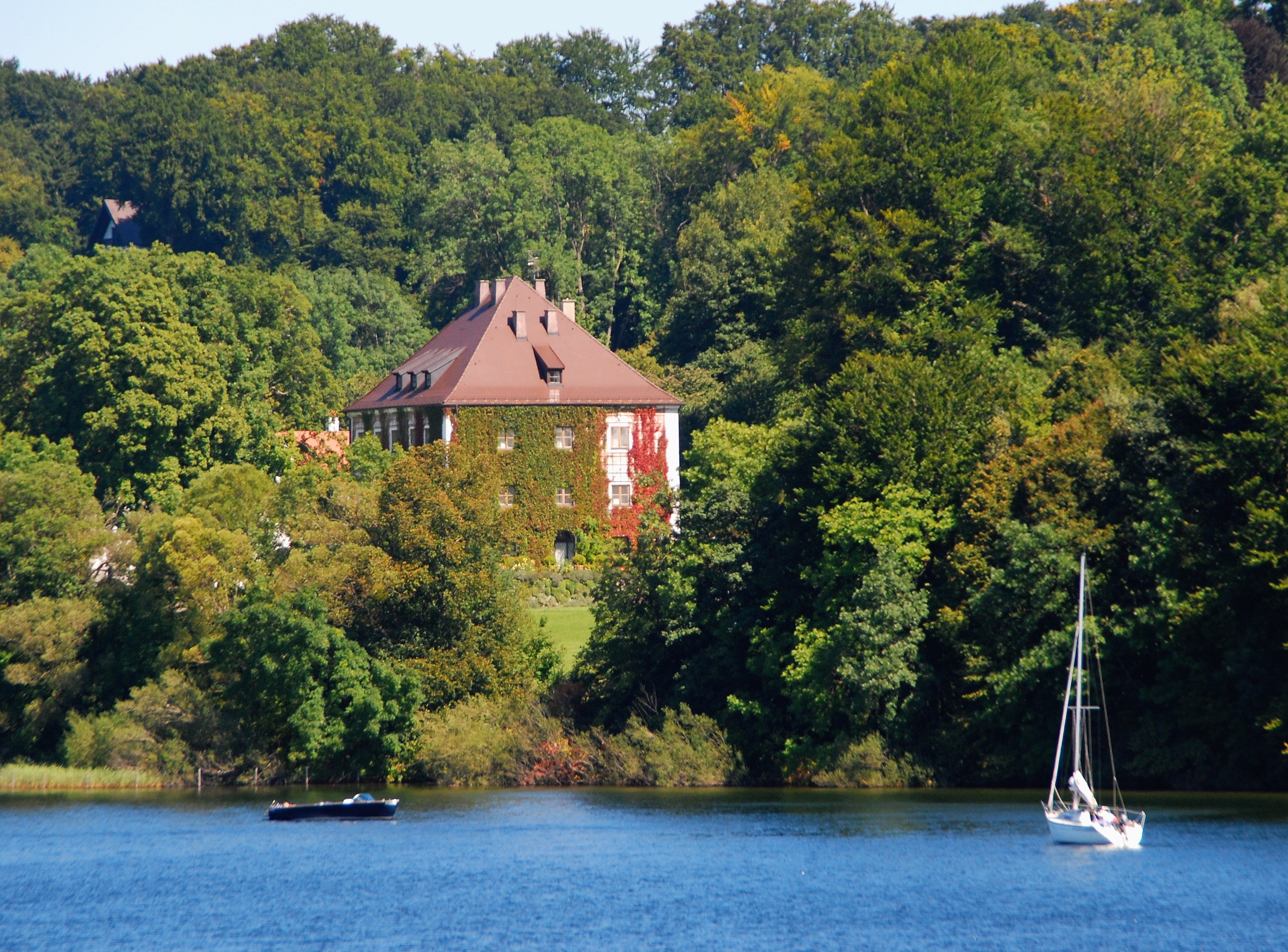
Berg Palace on the banks of Lake Starnberg

The building was built in 1640 in the style of an Italian Renaissance villa by Hans Georg von Hörwarth on the site of an older manor house. Hörwarth came from an Augsburg patrician family that had previously owned several properties in the area. The manor house is located on the shore of Lake Starnberg, opposite Possenhofen Castle.

=== Baroque period ===
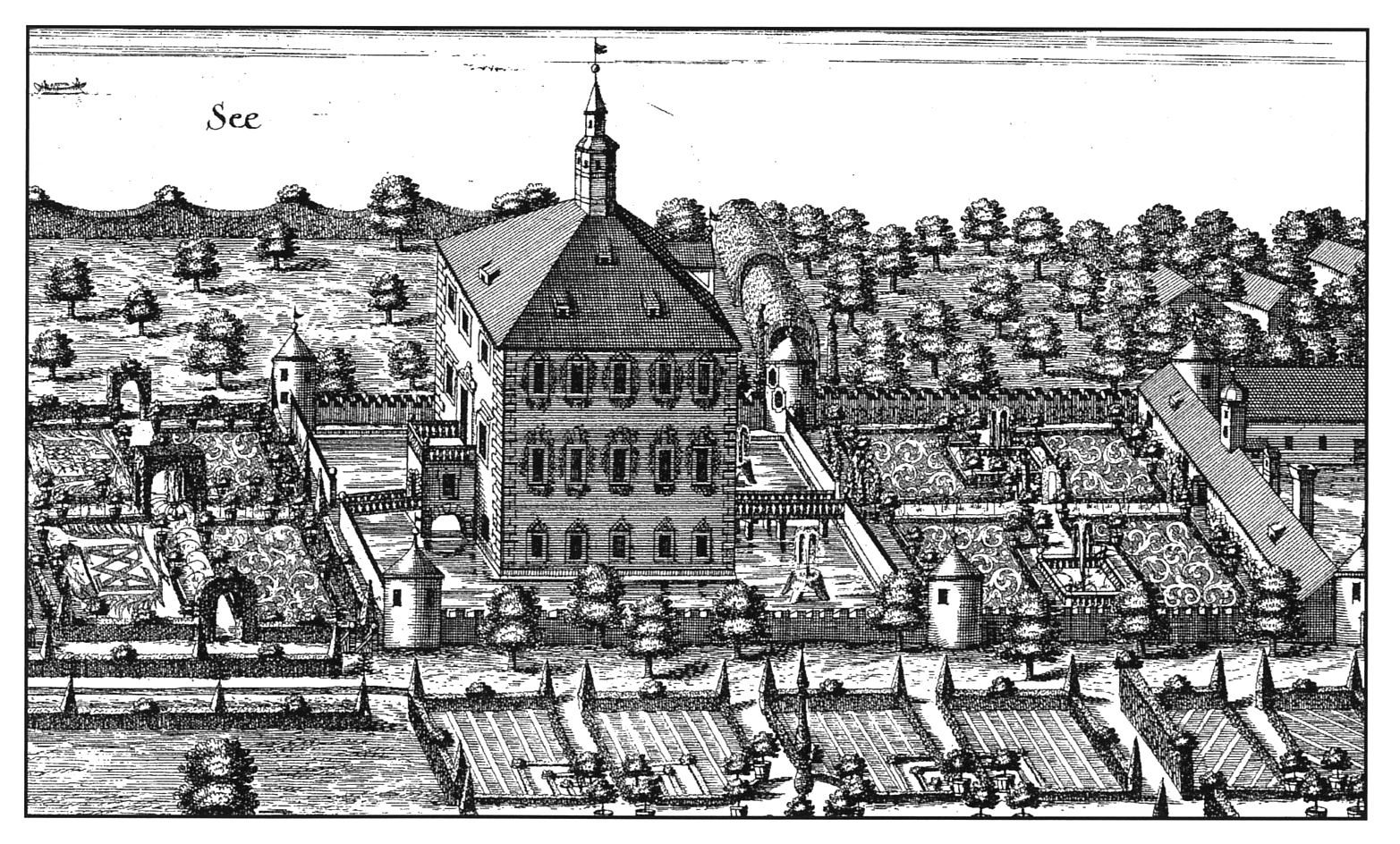
The hunting lodge with a formal Baroque garden around 1700

In 1676 Ferdinand Maria, Elector of Bavaria, acquired the estate from the Hörwarth family. He used it as a hunting lodge, for excursions from his summer castle in Starnberg, and for festivities. It reached its zenith under his successors, elector Max Emanuel, who sailed on the lake with a fleet of magnificent ships, and Emperor Charles VII, when it served as the ambiance for spectacular entertainment and hunting events.

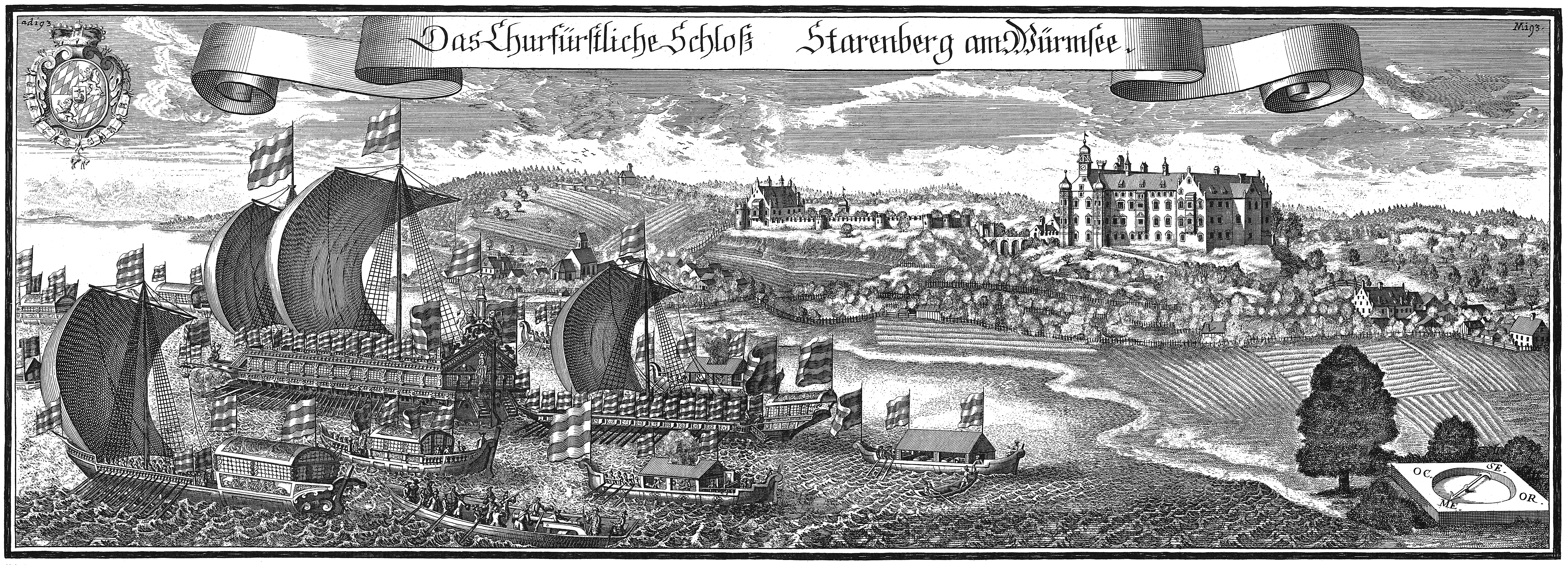
Starnberg Castle and the fleet of magnificent ships, led by the Bucentaurus, a copy of the ship of the Doges of Venice (around 1700).

=== 19th century ===
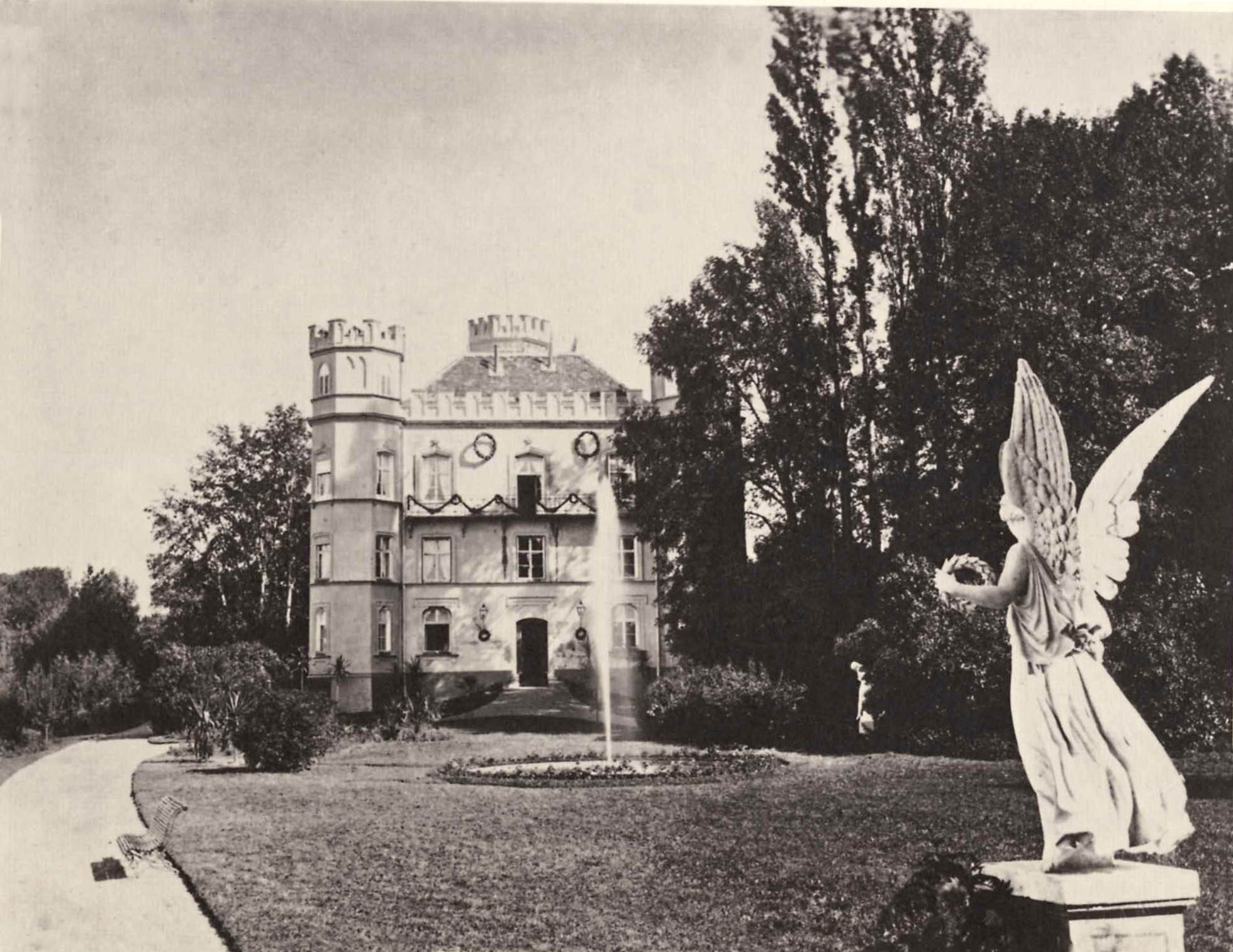
The palace as it appeared before World War II, in its 19th-century Gothic revival style, c. 1886

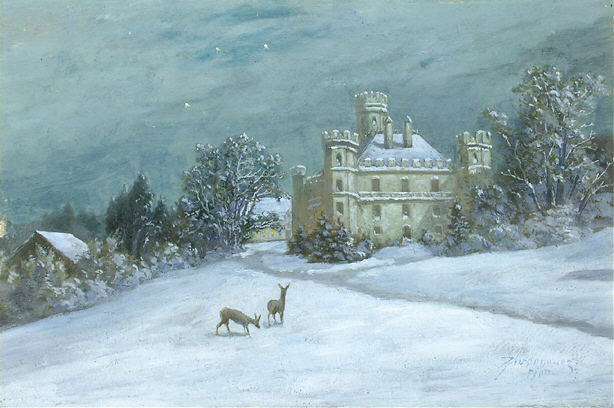
Berg Palace in winter (Anton Zwengauer)

Between 1849 and 1851 King Maximilian II instructed the architect Eduard Riedel to redesign the site in Neo-Gothic style, with added crenellations and four towers, for which the king bought additional land. Maximilian's son Ludwig II of Bavaria had a fifth tower constructed, which he called Isolde. In 1853 Maximilian had a small private harbour built.

Ludwig II used the site as his summer residence, moving here regularly every year on 11 May. For this purpose he established a telegraph line from Berg to the capital Munich.

In 1868 the Czarina of Russia Maria Alexandrovna visited Berg upon the King's invitation. Ludwig made it her residence for the duration of her visit and had it magnificently decorated for the occasion, as the site was otherwise rather modestly appointed by Ludwig's standards. He held a legendary festival in her honor with lanterns throughout the park and fireworks.

The surrounding park was fashioned and cultivated by his predecessors according to contemporary ideas of garden design, from a formal Baroque garden to an English landscape garden. Ludwig had the "Moorish Kiosk" set up here which Franz von Seitz had designed and built for the Winter Garden on the roof of the Munich Residenz. In 1876 the King had a small chapel built.

On 12 June 1886, Ludwig, after he had just been declared mentally impaired and incapable of ruling and his uncle Luitpold having been appointed regent, was transferred to Berg Palace. On June 13 he and his physician Bernhard von Gudden were found dead in the shallow waters at the banks of Lake Starnberg. The deaths remain contested, despite the official statement of drowning. A votive chapel and a memorial cross in the lake's shallows mark the site since.

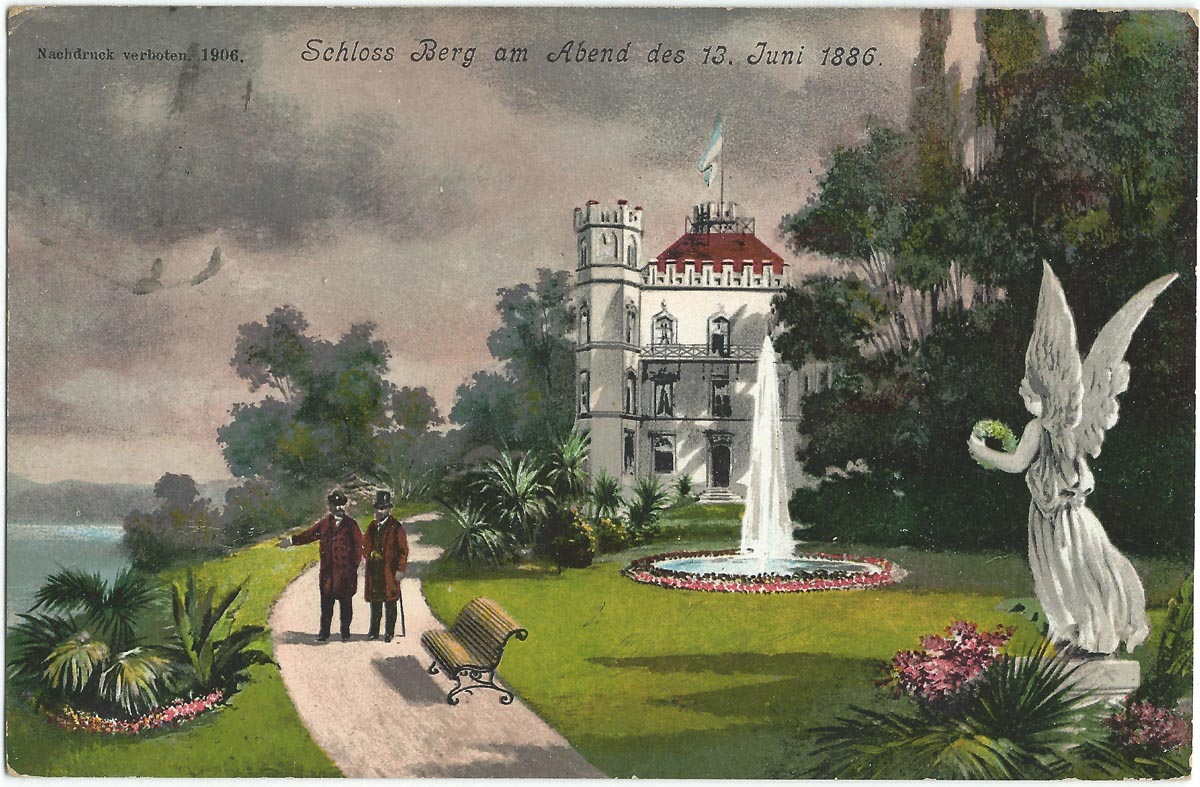
Postcard (around 1900) with the interned King Ludwig II and his psychotherapist Gudden on a walk in the park that ended fatally for both of them.

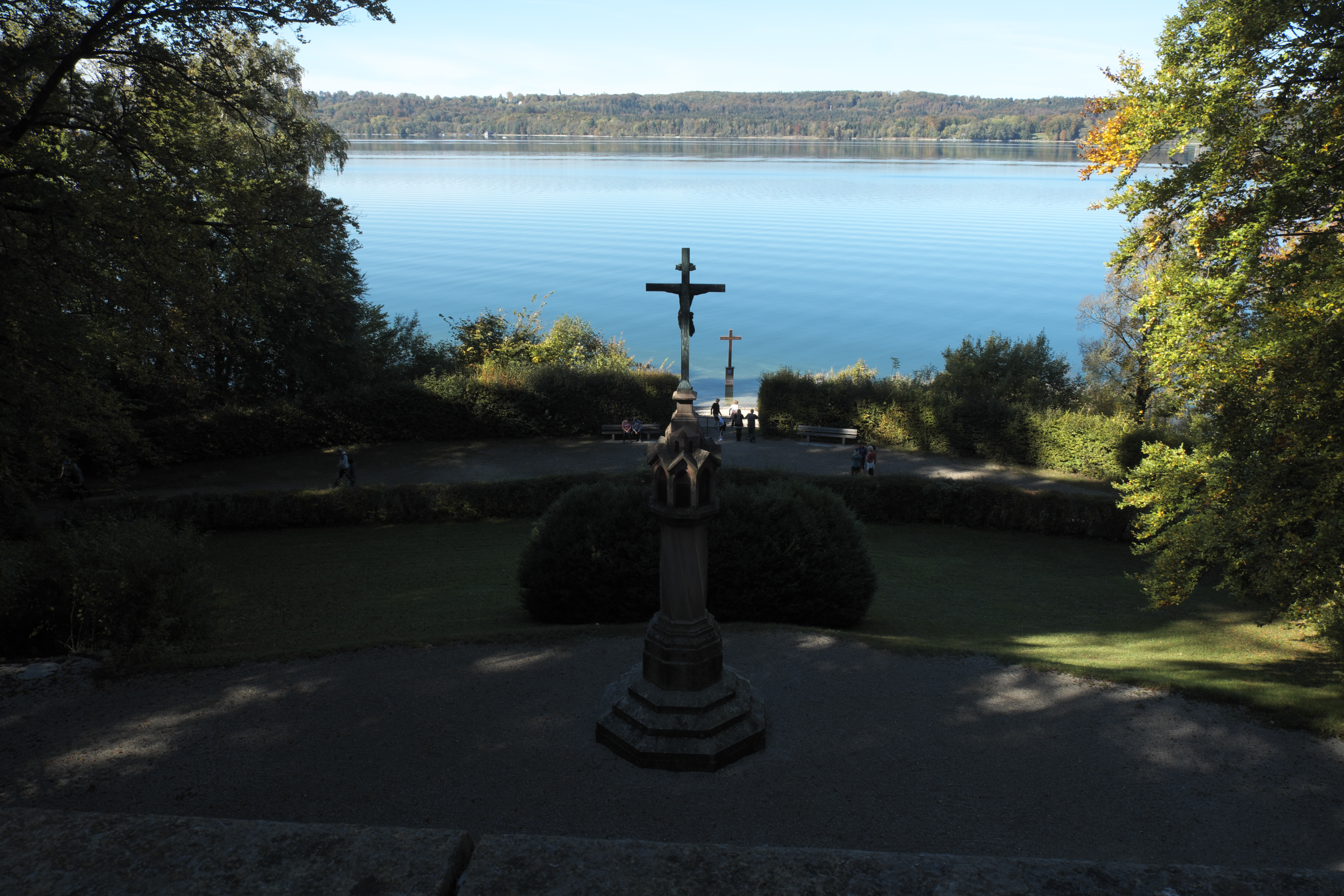
View through the park to the lake where a cross marks the spot in the shallow water where Ludwig II's body was found on 13 June 1886.

=== 20th century to today ===
After the king's death the house, still owned by the royal family, became a museum and in 1939 was declared a monument, as it had not been changed since Ludwig's death, and thus acquired not only a historical but also a cultural significance.

After World War II, the site was occupied by American soldiers, who damaged it severely, compounding previous damage caused by the war, especially to the corner towers, and further damage was caused due to burst water pipes. Little of the original furniture was preserved. Initially, the Wittelsbach Compensation Fund, owner since 1923 until today, considered demolishing the house. However, it was completely renovated from 1949 to 1951, as the corner towers were entirely removed and the building was restored to its Renaissance appearance before King Maximilian's gothic revival intervention. The chapel however remained. Subsequently Albrecht, Duke of Bavaria, moved in and used it as his main residence until his death in 1996, upon which his eldest son Franz followed him as head of the House of Wittelsbach. However, Franz decided to officially live in Munich instead, where he occupies a wing of the Nymphenburg Palace, and uses Berg Palace as his country retreat.

== Sources ==
- History of Schloss Berg (in German)
- Modern photographs of Schloss Berg
