= Anna-Maria Henckel von Donnersmarck =

German literary scout and activist

- Born: Anna-Maria Ebba Barbara Gräfin von Berg-Schönfeld; 5 March 1940 (age 86); Magdeburg, Saxony, Germany
- Occupations: political activist sociologist literary scout
- Spouse: Count Leo-Ferdinand Henckel von Donnersmarck
- Children: 2 (including Florian)
- Parent(s): Count Hans-Hubert von Berg; Countess Barbara von der Asseburg-Neindorf
- Family: Berg (by birth); Henckel von Donnersmarck (by marriage)

Countess Anna-Maria Ebba Barbara Henckel von Donnersmarck (née Countess Anna-Maria von Berg; born 5 March 1940) is a German literary scout, sociologist, and former political activist. She was active in the West German student movement as a member of the Sozialistischer Deutscher Studentenbund.

== Early life ==
Henckel von Donnersmarck was born Countess Anna-Maria von Berg-Schönfeld on 5 March 1940 in Magdeburg to Count Karl Ludwig Hans-Hubert von Berg and Countess Barbara von der Asseburg-Neindorf.

In 1945, when she was four years old, her family fled from their home in Saxony during the expulsion of the Germans by the Soviet Army and settled in West Berlin with some of their relatives.

Henckel von Donnersmarck was active in the West German student movement, a left-wing social movement consisting of mass student protests in West Germany rejecting traditionalism and opposing the German political authority's inclusion of former Nazi officials in government. She joined the Sozialistischer Deutscher Studentenbund, formerly the collegiate branch of the Social Democratic Party of Germany, that became affiliated with the Außerparlamentarische Opposition, which called for constitutional freedom of opinion and press, the freedom of assembly, and the democratization of university politics. During this time, she visited Wolf Biermann while he was under house arrest.

== Later life ==
On 31 May 1968, she married Count Leo-Ferdinand Henckel von Donnersmarck. They had two children:

- Count Sebastian Maria Carl Josef Wolfgang Henckel von Donnersmarck (b. 8 May 1972)
- Count Florian Maria Georg Christian Henckel von Donnersmarck (b. 2 May 1973)

She and her family moved to the United States in the mid-1970s and settled in Roosevelt Island in New York City's East River. In New York, Henckel von Donnersmarck was involved in literary, artistic, and political groups and befriended the Austrian Jewish émigré John Simon White, who later became the director of the New York City Opera. The family left the island in 1981 and returned to Berlin.

Henckel von Donnersmarck worked as a sociologist and as a literary scout.

Since her husband's death in 2009, she has lived in an apartment in Charlottenburg, in Berlin.
