= Gregor Henckel von Donnersmarck =

Austrian Catholic priest and theologian

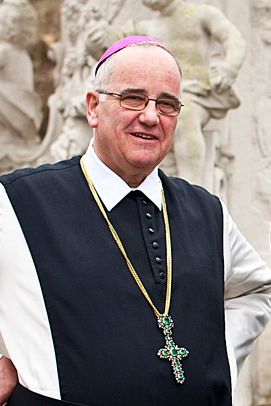
- Henckel von Donnersmarck in 2010
- Church: Catholic Church

Personal details
- Born: 16 January 1943 Wrocław, Poland
- Died: 20 April 2025 (aged 82) Heiligenkreuz, Austria
- Denomination: Catholic
- Occupation: priest, abbot, theologian

Count Gregor Ulrich Maria Henckel von Donnersmarck (16 January 1943 – 20 April 2025) was an Austrian Catholic priest, abbot, and theologian. He served as the 67th abbot of Heiligenkreuz Abbey and the chancellor of Benedict XVI Philosophical-Theological University.

== Biography ==
Henckel von Donnersmarck was born in Wrocław on 16 January 1943 to Count Friedrich-Carl Henckel von Donnersmarck and Countess Anna-Ilse von Zitzewitz. He was a member of the German-Austrian noble family Henckel von Donnersmarck. He was the brother of Count Leo-Ferdinand Henckel von Donnersmarck.

In 1999, he was elected as the 67th Abbot of Heiligenkreuz Abbey, a Cistercian monastery in the Vienna Woods. He served as chancellor of Benedict XVI Philosophical-Theological University from 1999 to 2011.

He died of cancer on 20 April 2025.
