= Central Committee of German Catholics =

Catholic lay organization in Germany

- Logo of ZdK
- Abbreviation: ZdK
- Formation: 3 October 1848; 178 years ago
- Region served: Germany
- Members: c. 230
- President: Irme Stetter-Karp
- Parent organization: Catholic Church in Germany
- Website: http://www.zdk.de/

The Central Committee of German Catholics (German: Zentralkomitee der deutschen Katholiken, ZdK) is a lay body comprising representatives of various Catholic organisations in Germany. They organise the Catholic Days in Germany. The organisation is headquartered in Berlin.

Its predecessor, the Catholic Society of Germany (German: Katholische Verein Deutschlands), was founded in 1848 by Charles, 6th Prince of Löwenstein-Wertheim-Rosenberg, who served as its first President. In 1952, it was renamed the Central Committee of German Catholics. In 2000 a conservative organization, the Forum of German Catholics, was founded in opposition to the committee.

In May 2015, the Central Committee of German Catholics voted in favour of blessing of same-sex unions in Christian churches.

Together with the German Bishops' Conference, the Central Committee of German Catholics organized the Synodal Way from 2019 to 2023, which was supposed to find solutions for the structural issues that made the sexual abuse of minors in the Church possible.
