= Leo-Ferdinand Henckel von Donnersmarck =

German historian, businessman, and official of the Order of Malta

President of the German Association of the Sovereign Military Order of Malta
- In office 1997–2006
- Succeeded by: Prince Erich von Lobkowicz

Personal details
- Born: Leo-Ferdinand Maria Lazarus Romwolt Wilhelm Edwin Gerhard Graf Henckel von Donnersmarck; 26 December 1935 Beuthen O.S., Upper Silesia, Germany
- Died: 23 July 2009 (aged 73) Berlin, Germany
- Resting place: Wolfsberg, Carinthia, Austria
- Spouse: Countess Anna-Maria von Berg
- Children: 2 (including Florian)
- Parent(s): Count Friedrich-Carl Henckel von Donnersmarck; Countess Anna-Ilse von Zitzewitz
- Relatives: Henckel von Donnersmarck family
- Education: University of Vienna; Institut Européen d'Administration des Affaires
- Occupation: historian, businessman, Catholic lay worker

Count Leo-Ferdinand Maria Lazarus Romwolt Wilhelm Edwin Gerhard Henckel von Donnersmarck (26 December 1935 – 23 July 2009) was a German historian, businessman, and Catholic lay worker. He worked as an executive for the German airline Lufthansa from 1967 to 1996. After retiring from business, Henckel von Donnersmarck served as the President of the German Association of the Sovereign Military Order of Malta from 1997 to 2006. He was made a Bailiff Grand Cross of Honour and Devotion, the Sovereign Military Order of Malta's highest honour. He was also a member of the Forum of German Catholics and, prior to that, a member of the Central Committee of German Catholics. Henckel von Donnersmarck was twice awarded the Order of Merit of the Federal Republic of Germany, receiving a Cross of Merit in 1991 and a Grand Cross of Merit in 2009.

== Early life, family, and education ==
Count Leo-Ferdinand Henckel von Donnersmarck was born on 26 December 1935 in Beuthen O.S. to Count Friedrich-Carl Henckel von Donnersmarck, a member of the Silesian nobility and a philosophist who specialized on the works of Thomas Aquinas, and Countess Anna-Ilse von Zitzewitz, a member of the Pomeranian nobility. He had a brother, Gregor. He was a member of the House of Henckel von Donnersmarck, an Austro-German noble family which had agricultural holdings and mining operations in Silesia since the 17th century.

During World War II, the family's estates fell under the Iron Curtain and their properties and assets were seized by the Soviets. When Henckel von Donnersmarck was nine years old, he and his parents, as Silesian Germans, were forced to leave their home due to the expulsion of the Germans from Poland by the Soviet army. In 1943, his father was drafted to serve in the German Army and immediately surrendered to American troops. The family, left impoverished, became refugees and settled in West Germany.

Henckel von Donnersmarck studied law and political science at the University of Vienna and completed a Master of Business Administration at the Institut Européen d'Administration des Affaires in Fontainebleau.

== Career ==
In 1967, Henckel von Donnersmarck began working as an executive at Lufthansa, a transport company and flag carrier of Germany. He retired in 1996.

From 2003 to 2009, he served on the board of trustees of Fürst Donnersmarck-Stiftung, a family foundation focusing on the rehabilitation of disabled people in Berlin. Henckel von Donnermarck was a member of the Central Committee of German Catholics. From 2000 to 2009, he served on the board of the Forum of German Catholics.

From 1997 to 2006, he served as the President of the Sovereign Military Order of Malta's German Association. During his presidency, he restructured the Maltese Relief Service. At the international level of the order, he acted as primus inter pares of the forty-seven presidents of national associations of the Order of Malta. He was succeeded by Prince Erich von Lobkowicz. Henckel von Donnersmarck was made a Bailiff Grand Cross of Honour and Devotion, the Sovereign Military Order of Malta's highest rank.

Henckel von Donnersmarck was twice awarded the Order of Merit of the Federal Republic of Germany, receiving a Cross of Merit in 1991 and a Grand Cross of Merit in 2009, presented by Klaus Wowereit.

== Personal life ==
In 1968, he married the literary scout and activist Countess Anna-Maria von Berg. His wife, who came from a noble family in Saxony-Anhalt, was four years old when her family fled to West Germany in order to escape the Soviet Army. Prior to their marriage, she was active in Leftist student movements in West Berlin. The couple had two sons, Sebastian and Florian.

When their sons were three and one, respectively, the family moved to Roosevelt Island in New York City's East River as part of a social experiment created by the Empire State Development Corporation to establish an economically diverse community on the former welfare island. The family left the island in 1981 and returned to Berlin.

Henckel von Donnersmarck was Catholic and deeply religious. His brother, Gregor, was an abbot.

== Death and burial ==
Henckel von Donnersmarck died on 23 July 2009 in Berlin after battling leukemia. While in the hospital, he was shown a special screening of Valkyrie organized by Tom Cruise.

A Latin requiem mass took place at Heiligenkreuz Abbey, where his brother served as Abbot. The funeral was attended by members of the Henckel von Donnersmarck family and by representatives of the Sovereign Military Order of Malta.

He was buried in the family mausoleum at Wolfsberg Castle in Carinthia.
