= Lazarus IV Henckel von Donnersmarck =

German politician and landowner

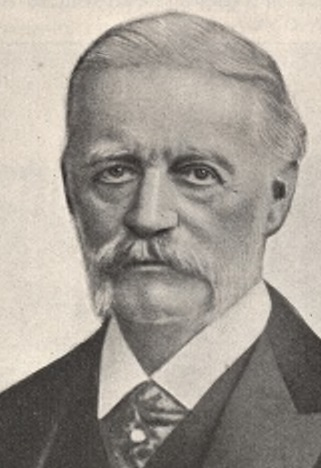
- Henckel von Donnersmarck in 1908

Member of the Reichstag
- In office 1884–1887

Member of the Prussian House of Representatives
- In office 1870–1876

Personal details
- Born: 23 May 1835 Siemianowitz-Laurahütte, Silesia, Kingdom of Prussia
- Died: 18 December 1914 (aged 79) Breslau, Prussia, German Empire
- Party: Centre Party
- Spouse: Countess Maria von Schweinitz und Krain
- Children: 3 (including Edwin)
- Parent(s): Count Hugo Henckel von Donnersmarck; Countess Laura von Hardenberg
- Occupation: politician, industrialist, landowner

Count Lazarus IV Henckel von Donnersmarck (23 May 1835 – 18 December 1914) was a German politician and landowner. He was a founding member of the Centre Party and sat in the Prussian House of Representatives from 1870 to 1876 and in the Reichstag from 1884 to 1887.

== Biography ==
Count Lazarus IV Henckel von Donnersmarck was born on 23 May 1835 in Siemianowitz-Laurahütte to Count Hugo Henckel von Donnersmarck and Countess Laurą von Hardenberg. He was a member of the House of Henckel von Donnersmarck, a Silesian noble family.

On 4 August 1858, he married Countess Maria von Schweinitz und Krain, Baroness zu Kauder. They had several children:

- Countess Alice Marie Laura Flora
- Countess Maria Theresa Josefina Wanda
- Count Edwin Hugo Lazarus

Henckel von Donnersmarck managed his 677-acre estate in Romolkwitz and owned shares in the Fideikommiss Beuthen as well as several coal mines. He lived in a palace in Nakło and, in 1892, he funded the construction of the parish church there. He also funded the construction of a church in Alt Tarnowitz and the Camillian monastery. He was Catholic, and was made a Knight of Honour and Devotion of the Sovereign Military Order of Malta.

He was one of the founders of the Centre Party. From 1870 to 1876, he was a member of the Prussian House of Representatives as a member of the Beuthen constituency and, from 1884 to 1887, he was a member of the German Reichstag for the constituency of Beuthen and Tarnowitz.

He died on 18 December 1914 in Breslau.
