= Hugo Henckel von Donnersmarck =

German-Austrian industrialist (1811-1890)

Count Hugo Henckel von Donnersmarck
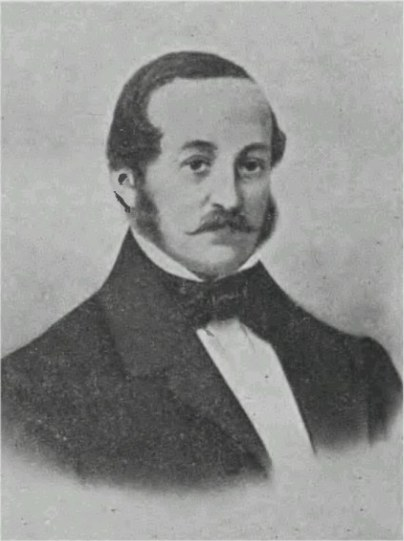
- Born: 26 April 1811; Siemianowitz, Upper Silesia, Kingdom of Prussia
- Died: 4 October 1890 (aged 79); Vienna, Austria-Hungary
- Buried: Wolfsberg Castle, Carinthia, Austria
- Noble family: Henckel von Donnersmarck
- Spouses: Countess Laurą von Hardenberg; Baroness Laurą von Kaszony
- Issue: Count Hugo II; Count Lazarus IV; Count Artur; Countess Laura; Count Alfons
- Parents: Count Karol Henckel von Donnersmarck; Countess Eugenia Wengersky von Ungarschütz
- Occupation: industrialist, entrepreneur, landowner

Count Hugo Karl Anton Lazarus Henckel von Donnersmarck (26 April 1811 – 4 October 1890) was a German-Austrian entrepreneur, landowner, and industrialist. He was active in agriculture, livestock, and the metal industry and built the first puddling and steel rolling mill in Germany. He later built a soda-pulp and paper mill in Frantschach-Sankt Gertraud, which remains the town's largest employer. Henckel von Donnersmarck rebuilt Wolfsberg Castle in Carinthia and built the Palais Henckel von Donnersmarck in Vienna.

== Biography ==
He was born the only child of Count Karol Henckel von Donnersmarck and Countess Eugenia Wengersky von Ungarschütz.

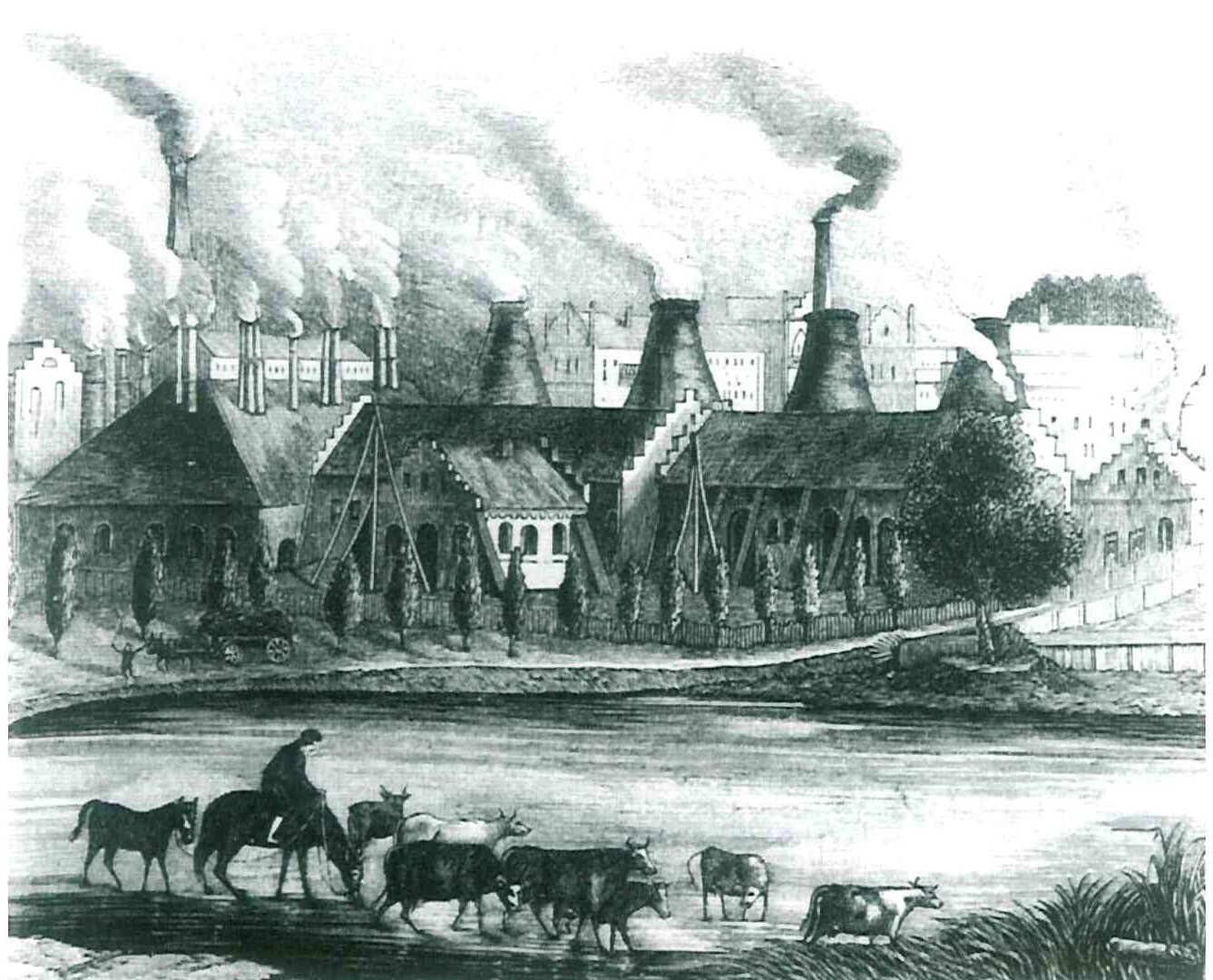
Laurahütte steelworks 1840

In 1832 he inherited his father's possessions in Bytom, Upper Silesia and began his involvement in agriculture, livestock, and heavy industry. He built the first puddling and Steel rolling mill in Germany at Laurahiitte (Siemianowice Śląskie). In 1846 he inherited Henckel von Donnersmarck family possessions in Carinthia; in particular Wolfsberg and Bad Sankt Leonhard in Lavanttal. Here he reorganized the steel industry and moved it from Frantschach-Sankt Gertraud in the Wolfsberg district to Zeltweg in Styria, where he had a puddling and steel rolling mill soon built.

By 1871 the company Vereinigte Königs- und Laurahütte was a major part of its coal and steel industry in Upper Silesia. To compensate the town of Frantschach for the loss of its steel industry he set up a soda-pulp and paper mill in 1881/82, which is still called Mondi Packaging Frantschach GmbH which is still the largest employer in Frantschach.

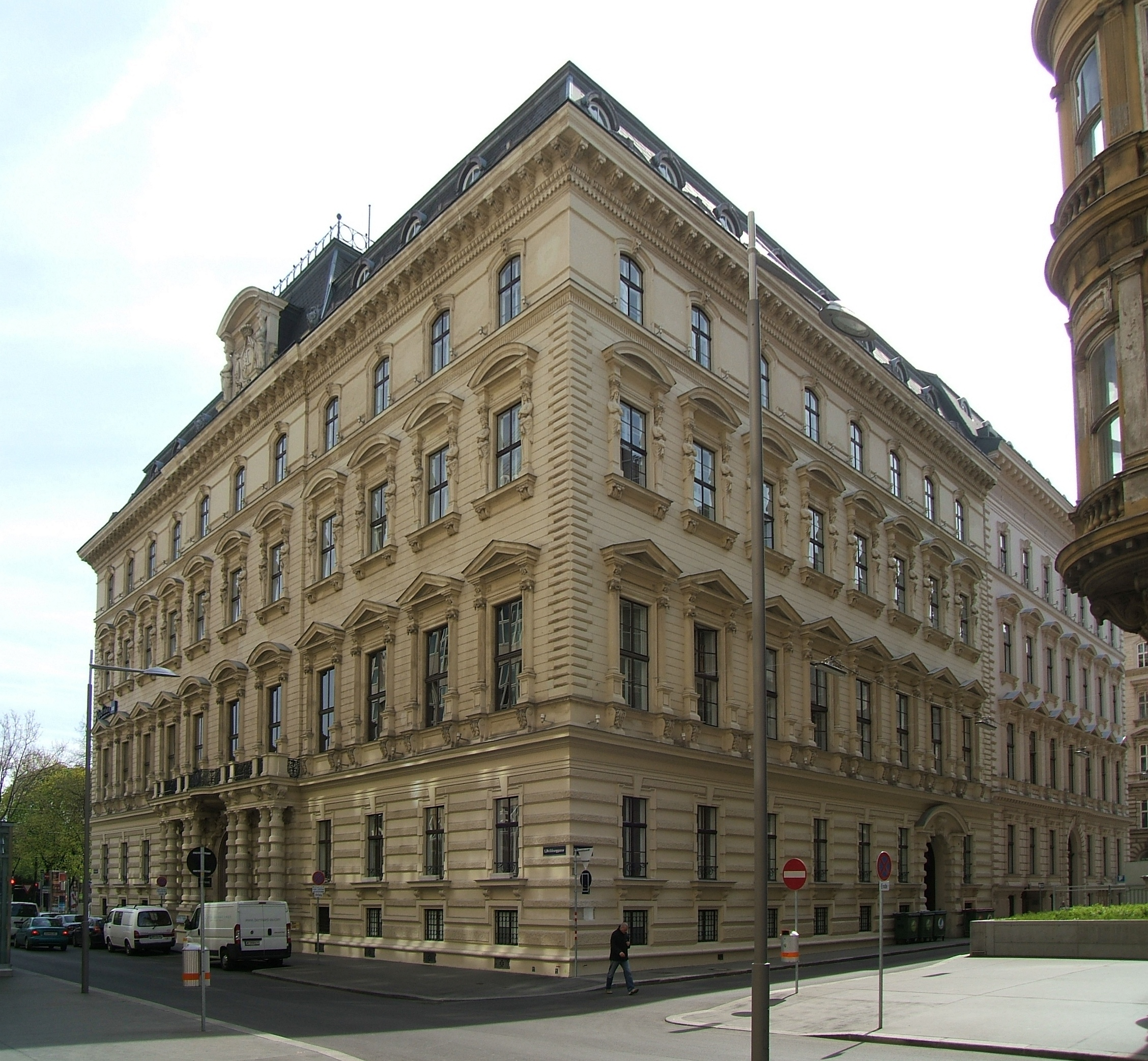
Palais Henckel von Donnersmarck

He rebuilt Castle Wolfsberg in neo-Gothic Tudor style was renewed.

He married twice first to Countess Laurą von Hardenberg (1812–1857), his second wife was Laurą von Kaszony (1836–1905) for whom he had the Palais Henckel von Donnersmarck in Vienna built as a gift in 1872.

His children were Hugo II (1832–1908), Łazarz IV (1835–1914), Artur (1836–1921), Laura (1838–1931) and Alfons (1840–1856). He was the grandfather of Count Edwin Henckel von Donnersmarck and Countess Margit Szapáry.

== See also ==
- Henckel von Donnersmarck family line
