= Ramułtowice =

- Village
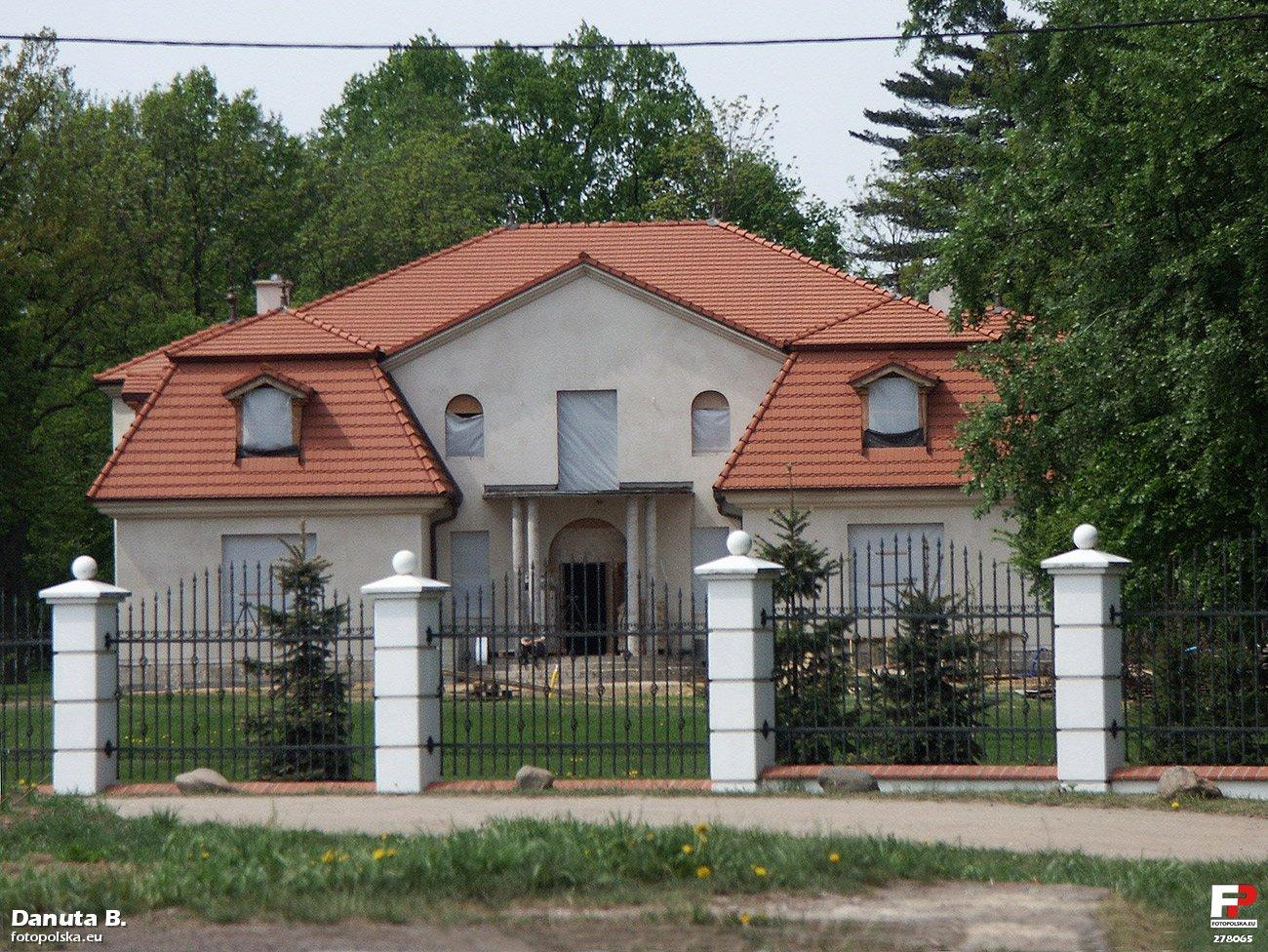

- Location within Poland
- Coordinates: 51°5′59″N 16°43′11″E
- Country: Poland
- Voivodeship: Lower Silesian
- County: Środa
- Gmina: Kostomłoty

Ramułtowice [ramuu̯tɔˈvit͡sɛ] is a village in the administrative district of Gmina Kostomłoty, within Środa County, Lower Silesian Voivodeship, in south-western Poland.

== Notable people ==
- Count Edwin Henckel von Donnersmarck (1865–1929), German politician and industrialist
- Count Friedrich-Carl Henckel von Donnersmarck (1905–1989), German philosopher
- Count Karl Josef Henckel von Donnersmarck (1928–2008), husband of Princess Marie Adelaide of Luxembourg
