= Wolfsberg Castle (Carinthia) =

Austrian historic building

Coordinates: 46°50′28.5″N 14°50′50.4″E

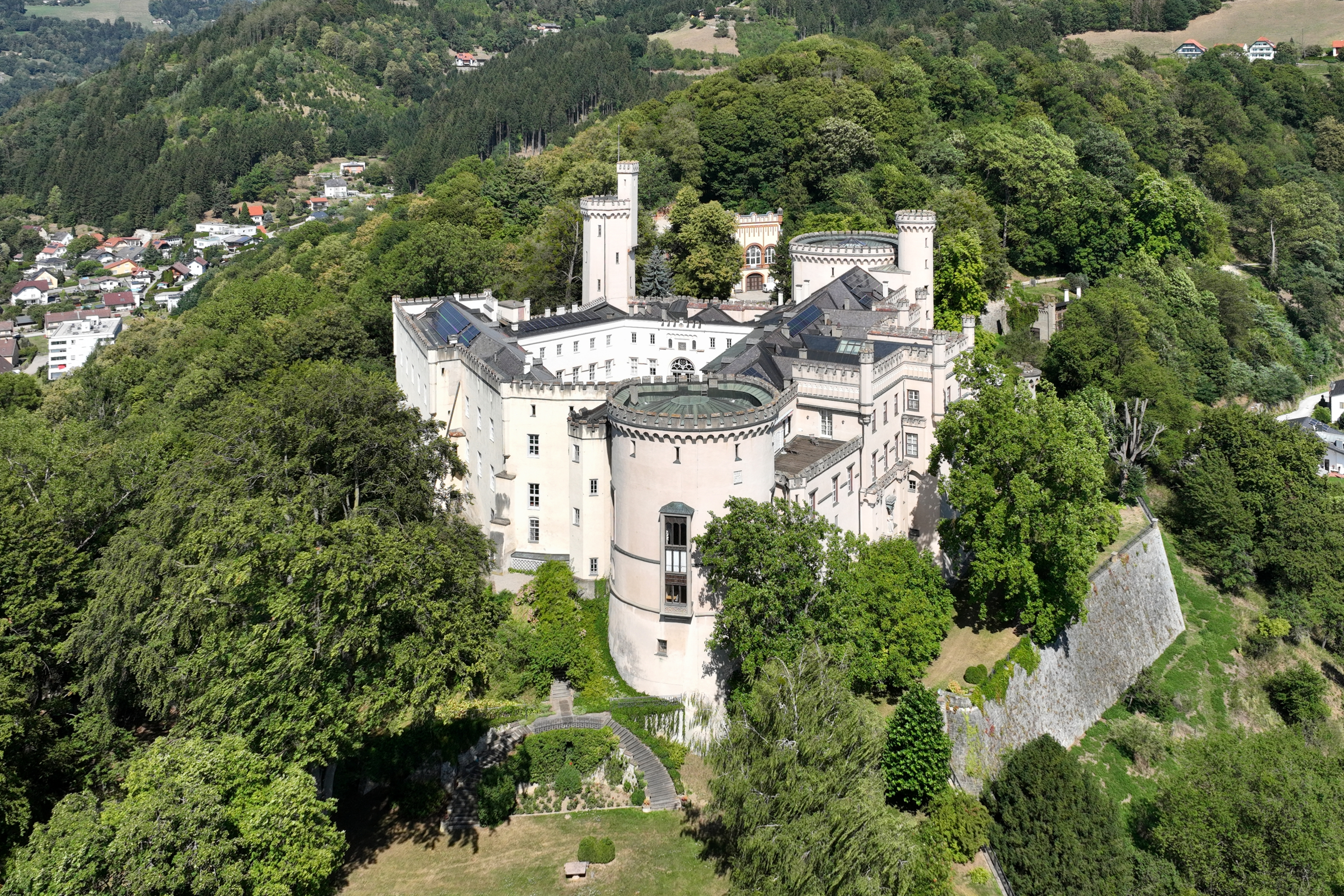
Wolfsberg Castle

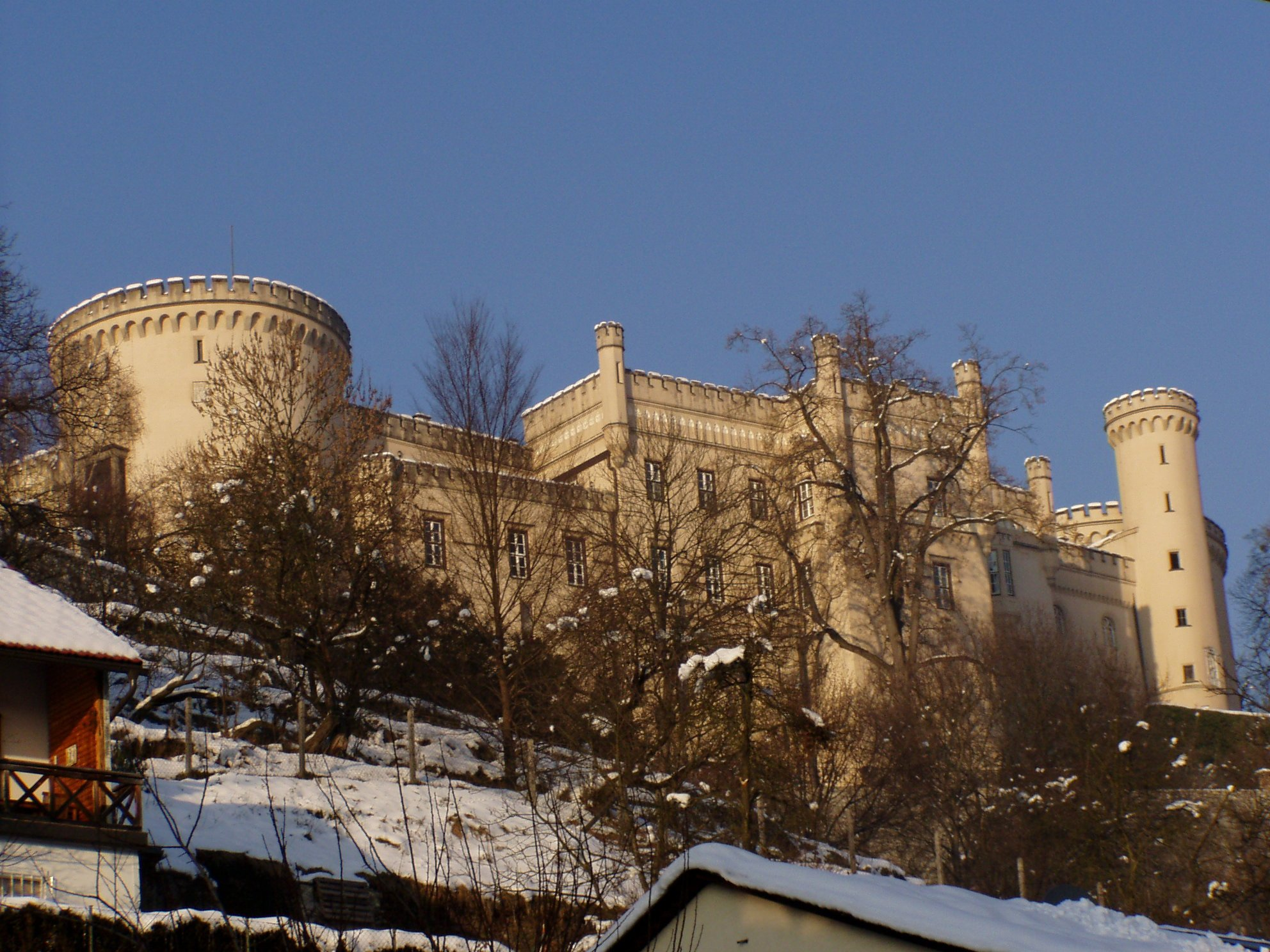
South view of Wolfsberg Castle

Wolfsberg Castle (German: Schloss Wolfsberg), today also Henckel-Donnersmarck Castle (Schloss Henckel-Donnersmarck), stands on a knoll in the north of the town of Wolfsberg in the Austrian state of Carinthia.

== History ==
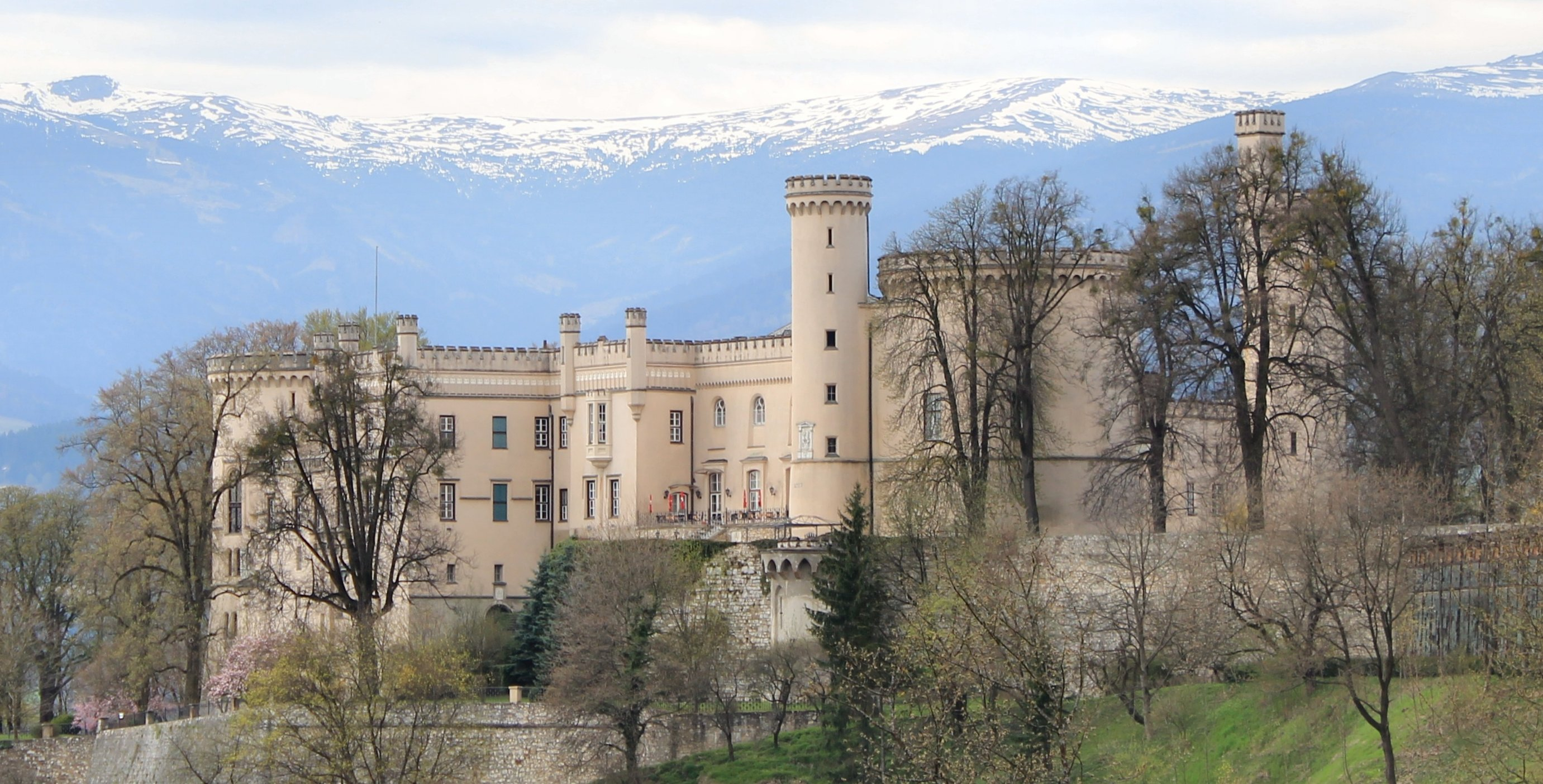
Façade of the main building

The property was owned by the Bishopric of Bamberg from 1007. The castle itself was mentioned for the first time in 1178 in a document from Saint Paul's Abbey. It was the prerequisite for the development of the eponymous settlement, which rose to town status in 1289. From the second quarter of the 14th century until the sale of the entire Bamberg estate in Carinthia to the Austrian state in 1759, the castle served as the residence of the vice-dominus, who represented the bishop in the local issues. The building, consisting of two irregular, interconnected wings, was converted by Italian architects in the 16th century into a fortress to guard against the approaching Turks. At the same time, the complex was expanded with domestic buildings, gates and towers. In 1561, a bell tower was built.

In 1846, the industrial pioneer, Hugo Henckel von Donnersmarck, acquired the barony of Wolfsberg, mainly because of its wealth of wood and hydropower, which he needed to operate his iron works. He converted the castle from 1847 to 1853 into a palace in the English Tudor style using the two Viennese architects Johann Romano and August Schwendenwein and had a lavishly decorated interior built. There is almost nothing left of the former Renaissance building.

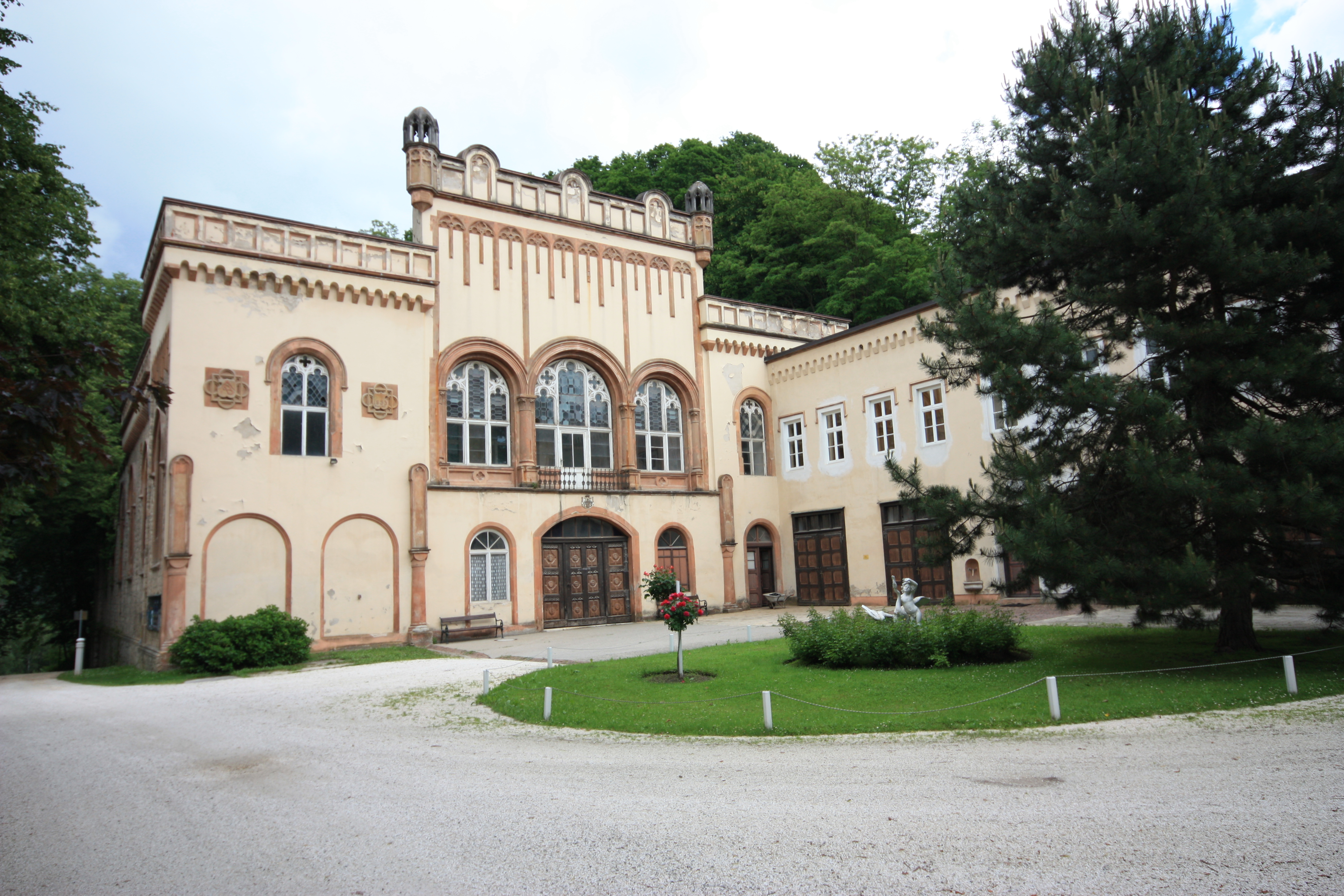
The former riding school

Next to the main building itself there is also a former riding school, built in 1855 in Neo-Romanesque style.

The castle grounds also date back to the 1850s. The extensive landscape garden is one of the more important garden architectural monuments in Austria and is listed in the Monument Protection Act.

The current owner of the estate is the Kärntner Montanindustrie (Carinthian Mining Industry), which hires the halls for events and weddings. The Managing Director is Andreas Graf Henckel von Donnersmarck. The castle restaurant is run by the Stölzl family.

== Literature ==
- Dehio-Handbuch. Die Kunstdenkmäler Österreichs. Kärnten. 3rd revised and improved edition, revised by Gabriele Russwurm-Biró. Anton Schroll, Vienna, 2001, ISBN 3-7031-0712-X, pp. 1077–1079.
- Wilhelm Deuer: Burgen und Schlösser in Kärnten. Verlag Johannes Heyn, Klagenfurt, 2008, ISBN 978-3-7084-0307-6, pp. 252ff.
