= 2004 Nobel Prize in Literature =

- Elfriede Jelinek
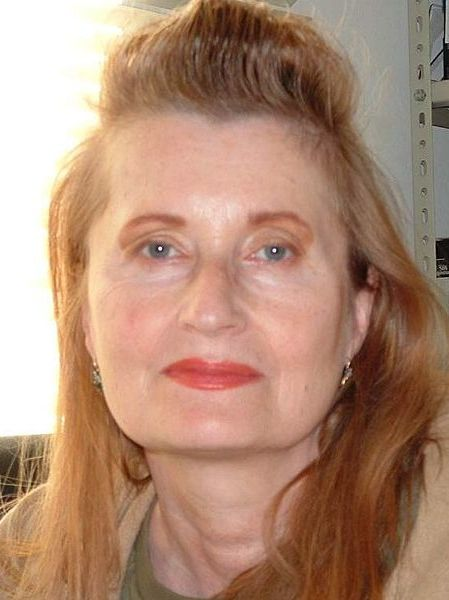
- "for her musical flow of voices and counter-voices in novels and plays that with extraordinary linguistic zeal reveal the absurdity of society's clichés and their subjugating power"
- Date: 7 October 2004 (announcement); 10 December 2004 (ceremony)
- Location: Stockholm, Sweden
- Presented by: Swedish Academy
- First award: 1901
- Website: Official website

The 2004 Nobel Prize in Literature was awarded to the Austrian writer Elfriede Jelinek (born 1946) "for her musical flow of voices and counter-voices in novels and plays that with extraordinary linguistic zeal reveal the absurdity of society's clichés and their subjugating power". She is the tenth female and the first Austrian Nobel laureate followed by Peter Handke in 2019.

== Laureate ==
Elfriede Jelinek literary career includes drama and poetry as well as prose. Among her most famous works we find the novels Die Klavierspielerin ("The Piano Teacher", 1983), Lust (1989), and Gier ("Greed", 2000), all of which are characterized by a satirical sharpness, an experimental urge and an uncompromising outspokenness. Through her work she has made herself known as a harsh critic of modern consumer society, uncovering hidden structures of sexism, sadism and submission. She has expressed that she taps on language to hear its hidden ideologies, much as a doctor might tap on a patient's chest. Among her other well-known works are Die Ausgesperrten ("Wonderful, Wonderful Times", 1980), Die Kinder der Toten ("The Children of the Dead", 1995), and the play Ein Sportstück ("Sports Play", 1998).

== Ladbrokes favourites ==
On Ladbrokes, top favourites to win the 2004 Nobel Prize in Literature were Syrian poet Adonis, American novelist Joyce Carol Oates and Swedish poet Tomas Tranströmer (subsequently awarded the prize in 2011), followed by Belgian Hugo Claus, Italian Antonio Tabucchi, Czech Milan Kundera, Dutch Cees Nooteboom, French J. M. G. Le Clézio (awarded in 2008), Korean Ko Un, American Don DeLillo and Danish Inger Christensen.

== Reactions ==
Jelinek said she felt very happy to receive the Nobel Prize, but felt "despair for becoming a known, a person of the public". Known for her modesty and subtle self-irony, she – a reputed feminist writer – wondered whether she had been awarded the prize mainly for "being a woman", and suggested that among authors writing in German, Peter Handke, whom she praised as a "living classic", would have been a more worthy recipient. (Handke subsequently won the Nobel Prize in 2019.)

Jelinek was criticized for not accepting the prize in person; instead, a video message was presented at the ceremony. Others appreciated how Jelinek revealed that she has agoraphobia and social phobia, paranoid conditions that developed when she first decided to write seriously.

She has said her anxiety disorders make it impossible for her to go to the cinema or board an airplane (in an interview she wished to be able to fly to New York to see the skyscrapers one day before dying), and incapable of taking part in any ceremony.

In 2005, Knut Ahnlund left the Swedish Academy in protest, describing Jelinek's work as "whining, unenjoyable public pornography", as well as "a mass of text shovelled together without artistic structure". He said later that her selection for the prize "has not only done irreparable damage to all progressive forces, it has also confused the general view of literature as an art".

In an interview Jelinek gave to the Frankfurter Allgemeine Zeitung after receiving the Nobel Prize, Jelinek said that until then, she had written against great inner resistance ("like constantly having to vomit") out of a sense of social and political obligation.
