= Austerlitz (novel) =

2001 novel by W. G. Sebald

- Author: W. G. Sebald
- Translator: Anthea Bell
- Cover artist: Andy Carpenter
- Language: German
- Genre: Historical novel
- Publisher: Hanser
- Publication date: 6 November 2001
- Publication place: Germany
- Media type: Print (Hardback & Paperback)
- Pages: 416
- ISBN: 3-446-19986-1
- OCLC: 46380518

Austerlitz is the fourth and final novel by German writer W. G. Sebald, published in 2001. It received critical acclaim, winning several awards including the National Book Critics Circle Award, and various publications have since named it one of the best novels of the 21st century so far.

The novel's text lacks paragraph breaks, except upon interstitial pictures which compliment the story. It is told by an unnamed narrator who describes a series of reconnections with a Jewish architectural historian named Jacques Austerlitz. Over the course of these, Austerlitz progressively recalled his life's story, including his childhood move from Prague to Wales amidst the Nazi occupation of Czechoslovakia (1938–1945), and his later search for his parents whom he had been separated from.

== Plot ==
Jacques Austerlitz, the main character in the book, is an architectural historian who encounters and befriends the solitary narrator in Antwerp during the 1960s. Gradually, we come to understand his life history. He arrived in Britain during the summer of 1939 as an infant refugee on a Kindertransport from a Czechoslovakia threatened by Hitler's Nazis. He was adopted by an elderly Welsh Nonconformist preacher and his sickly wife and spent his childhood near Bala, Gwynedd, before attending a minor public school. When his foster parents died, Austerlitz learned something of his background. After school, he attended Oriel College, Oxford and became an academic, beginning his research in European architecture, a topic he was drawn to.

After a nervous breakdown, Austerlitz visits Prague, where he meets a close friend of his lost parents, Vera, who often took care of "Jacquot" when his parents were away. As he speaks with her, memories return, including French and Czech expressions she taught him. The elderly lady tells him the fate of his mother, an actress and opera singer who was deported to Theresienstadt Ghetto. From Prague, Austerlitz travels to Theriesenstadt, and after returning to England via train, with an emotionally difficult journey through Germany, manages to obtain a 14-minute video compilation of highlights from Theresienstadt: Ein Dokumentarfilm aus dem jüdischen Siedlungsgebiet, the 1944 Nazi propaganda film, in which he believes he recognizes his mother. Vera, however, dismisses the woman from the documentary. Instead, she confirms the identity of Austerlitz's mother in a photograph of an anonymous actress, which Austerlitz found in the Prague theatrical archives.

The novel shifts to contemporary Paris as Austerlitz seeks out any remaining evidence about his father's fate. He meets up with the narrator and tells him of his first sojourn in Paris in 1959 when he suffered his first nervous breakdown and was hospitalized; Marie de Verneuil, a young Frenchwoman with whom he became acquainted in the library, helped nurse him back to health.

Sebald explores the ways in which collections of records, such as the Bibliothèque nationale de France or National Library of France, entomb memories. During the novel, the reader is taken on a guided tour of a lost European civilization: a world of fortresses, railway stations, concentration camps and libraries.

== Background ==
Sebald saw a programme on BBC television about the Kindertransport entitled Whatever Happened to Susi? In 1939, 3-year-old twins Lotte and Susi Bechhöfer arrived in London on a Kindertransport evacuating Jewish children from Germany. Adopted by a childless Welsh minister and his wife, they were given a new identity to erase all traces of their previous existence. Only fifty years later, after Lotte's death from a brain tumour at the age of 35, did Susi Bechhöfer discover that their parents were Rosa Bechhöfer, a young Jewish woman who was murdered in the gas chambers of Auschwitz, and Otto Hald, a soldier in Hitler's army. The discovery of her real identity propels Susi on a painful and courageous quest in search of her past and the surviving members of her natural family. In the course of her search, she confronts dark secrets from her own past and urgently needs to reappraise her life. In 1999, Susi published a memoir, Rosa's Child: One Woman's Search for Her Past and a film has been made from it titled Susi's Story. Sebald told Joseph Cuomo in an interview that he tried to obtain a copy of the BBC programme, but the BBC would not release it.

At the conclusion of the book the narrator takes from his rucksack a copy of Dan Jacobson's Heshel's Kingdom, an account of his journey in the 1990s to Lithuania in search of traces of his grandfather Heshel's world. The Orthodox rabbi Heshel Melamed's sudden death in 1919 had provided an opportunity for his widow and nine children to leave Lithuania for South Africa, which, in light of events two decades later, had been a gift of life. "On his travels in Lithuania Jacobson finds scarcely any trace of his forebears, only signs everywhere of the annihilation from which Heshel's weak heart had preserved his immediate family when it stopped beating."

== Style and structure ==
Formally, the novel is notable because of its lack of paragraphing, a digressive style, the blending of fact and fiction and very long and complex sentences. One such sentence runs to seven and a half pages and combines the history and description of Theresienstadt. It is prompted by Austerlitz's having read the major 1995 study of the ghetto, Theresienstadt 1941–1945: Das Antlitz einer Zwangsgemeinschaft by H. G. Adler, and recounting it to the narrator as they are walking around London, from St Clement's Hospital where Austerlitz had been admitted in 1993 after his arrival at Liverpool Street on his return from Prague.

Mysterious and evocative photographs are also scattered throughout the book, enhancing the melancholy message of the text. The photographs are real, but the circumstances surrounding them are fictional. For example, the picture used for the front cover is said to be a picture of Austerlitz during his youth; in actuality, it is a picture of unnamed young boy, taken from a postcard from Stockport. James Wood calls these photographs "fictional twice over", in that they are both photographs of people who only exist in fiction and photographs of people who have faded into obscurity. Many of these features characterize Sebald's other works of fiction, including The Emigrants, The Rings of Saturn and Vertigo.

Austerlitz tells his story to the narrator between 1967 and 1997. They first meet in Antwerp, and then in a few other places in Belgium (they take a ferry together back to England from Zeebrugge). Between 1967 and 1975, they meet regularly in Bloomsbury, London, where Austerlitz works as an art historian and teacher; the narrator studies in England and travels to London by train. They lose touch after the narrator returns to Germany: he surmises that perhaps Austerlitz does not like to write letters to Germany. They meet again in December 1996, in the Great Eastern Hotel, London; the narrator has returned to England and has traveled to London to visit an eye doctor, running into Austerlitz by chance. They talk until late, then meet the next day in Greenwich.

== Themes ==
A broad and pervasive theme of the novel is the metaphor of water as time, a metaphor which helps explain two (arguably three) appearances of Noah's Ark in the novel: the first a golden picture (reproduced on page 43 of the text) in the Freemasons' temple of the Great Eastern Hotel, London; the second a toy Noah's Ark in the hermetically sealed billiards room of Iver Grove, a then abandoned estate on the outskirts of postwar Oxford (later home to Tom Stoppard); and the third (arguably) the new Bibliothèque Nationale in Paris.

== Notable locations ==
The novel mentions and expands upon several locations in detail, including:

- Liverpool Street Station (as well as the McDonald's located there)
- Great Eastern Hotel, London (now called Andaz London Liverpool Street)
- St. Clement's Hospital, London
- Alderney Street, London
- Rue de Richelieu, Paris
- Montparnasse Cemetery
- Theresienstadt
- Fort Breendonk, Breendonk
- Bibliotheque Nationale de France, Paris (in particular the Haut-de-jardin reading room)
- Lake Vyrnwy, Powys
- Barmouth, Gwynedd
- Antwerp Central Station, Antwerp, in particular the station restaurant

== Reception ==
In the United States, Austerlitz won the 2001 National Book Critics Circle Award for fiction and the 2001 Salon Book Award. In the UK, the book won the 2002 Independent Foreign Fiction Prize and the 2002 Jewish Quarterly-Wingate Literary Prize. Anthea Bell won the 2002 Helen and Kurt Wolff Translator's Prize, awarded by the Goethe-Institut Chicago, for her translation of Austerlitz into English.

In 2019, it was ranked 5th on The Guardian's list of the 100 best books of the 21st century. The New York Times Book Review named it the 8th best book (7th out of fictional books) on their 100 Best Books of the 21st Century list.

In 2024, Austerlitz was chosen as the final novel of the twentieth century in Edwin Frank's book, Stranger Than Fiction: Lives of the Twentieth-Century Novel. Frank is the founder of the New York Review Books Classics series.

== Editions ==
- Austerlitz. Munich: C. Hanser, 2001.
- Austerlitz. Translated by Anthea Bell. New York: Random House, 2001.
