= Yana Ross =

Latvian-American director

- Occupation: Director
- Website: yanaross.com

Yana Ross is a Lithuanian-American director.

== Career ==
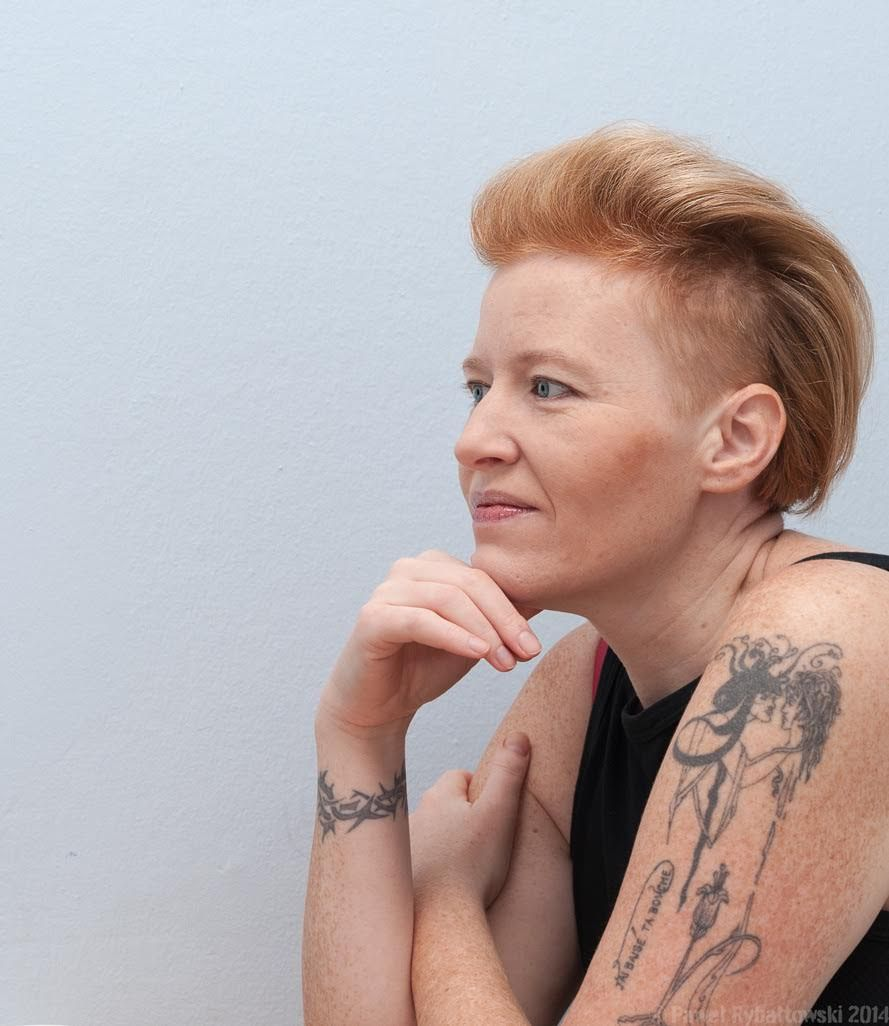
2015

She directed the plays Sleeping Beauty and Bambiland by Elfriede Jelinek, and has worked internationally from Volksbühne am Rosa-Luxemburg-Platz to Seoul Performing Arts Festival in South Korea, Lithuanian National Drama Theater, Finnish National Theater (Finland), Barka Theater (Hungary), Uppsala Stadsteater (Sweden), Laźnia Nowa and TR Warszawa (Poland) and Reykjavik City Theater (Iceland). Ross is a Fulbright Fellowship recipient. She received the John Gassner Memorial prize for her work on Russian Theater of the 21st Century, a special project in her role as managing editor at Yale Theater magazine. She has received Best Director awards in Sweden, Poland and Lithuania and her work is currently touring to Vienna, New York and China. She was a resident director at the Schauspielhaus Zürich and from 2022 collaborated with Berliner Ensemble.

== Personal life ==
Ross was born in 1973 to Jewish/Ukrainian/Polish family, grew up on Baltic sea till age 7. She studied at GITIS (Russian Institute of Theatre Arts) and then moved to the United States in her teens. She obtained a degree in mass-communications and later received her Master of Fine Arts degree from the Yale School of Drama in 2006. She was working as a television producer in New York when she witnessed the September 11th attacks. She returned to work in Europe in 2007.

== Theater ==
Year	Title
2006	A Kingdom in the Snow
2007	Bambiland
2007	Lucia Skates
2007	Bremer Freiheit
2008	Macbeth
2008	Sleeping Beauty
2009	Baumeister Solness
2009	Taxi N5
2010	Der Reigen
2011	Opera.ID
2011	Suor Angelica and Gianni Schicchi
2011	Chaos
2012	Red Laces
2013	Our Class
2014	The Killer
2014	Uncle Vanya
2014	Request Concert
2015	Heart of a Dog
2015	Seagull
2015	The Lake
2017	Three Sisters
2018	Dollhouse
2018	The Wild Duck
2019	Tales from Vienna Woods
2019	Cherry Orchard
2019	Wunschkonzert
2020	Mein Jahr der Ruhe und Entspannung (adapted from My Year of Rest and Relaxation)
2021	Kurze Interviews mit fiesen Männern – 22 Arten der Einsamkeit (adapted from Brief Interviews with Hideous Men)
2022	Reigen
