= For Years Now =

First edition

For Years Now is a book of 23 poems by the German writer W. G. Sebald with images provided by British visual artist Tess Jaray. It was published by Short Books, London in 2001.
