= Tess Jaray =

British painter and printmaker (1937–2026)

Tess Jaray RA
- Early Piazza, 1964. Oil on canvas
- Born: 31 December 1937; Vienna, Austria
- Died: 24 May 2026 (aged 88)
- Education: Saint Martins School of Art, Slade School of Fine Art
- Known for: Painting and drawing
- Spouse: Marc Vaux (m. 1960; div. 1982)
- Children: 2
- Website: tessjaray.com

Tess Jaray RA (31 December 1937 – 24 May 2026) was a British painter and printmaker. She taught at The Slade School of Fine Art, UCL from 1968 until 1999. For over 20 years Jaray completed a succession of major public art projects. Jaray was made an Honorary Fellow of RIBA (Royal Institute for British Architects) in 1995 and a Royal Academician in 2010 and later a Senior RA in 2013. In 2017 she received an honorary award from Norwich University of the Arts in recognition of her outstanding contribution to fine art and fine art education. In 2025 she received an honorary doctorate from the University of the Arts London (UAL).

== Early life ==
Born in Vienna on 31 December 1937, Jaray grew up in rural Worcestershire, England, where her parents emigrated in 1938 after the annexation of Austria by Nazi Germany made it unsafe for people of Jewish descent to live there. Jaray's father Franz Ferdinand Jaray was a chemical engineer and industrial inventor. Her mother, Pauline Arndt, attended art school in Vienna. Jaray's great aunt was the gallerist Lea Bondi Jaray who was responsible for bringing many of the German Expressionists to London. Noting the influence of Gustav Klimt, leader of the Vienna Secessionists, Jaray wrote that "He was one of the very first artists I learned about as a teenager."

== Travel, education and influence ==
Jaray studied at the Saint Martins School of Art and the Slade School of Fine Art. With a guaranteed place at the Slade she took time out to travel to Paris where she stayed at no.16 Rue des Cannettes in the hotel run by Marcel Proust's former housekeeper, Céleste Albaret. In Paris Jaray made several formative relationships including with fellow hotel guest Valli Myers and the Slovenian painter Zoran Mušič.

After five months Jaray returned to London to attend the Slade. At that time William Coldstream was Professor of Painting and the art historian E.H. Gombrich was in his last year as Professor of Art History. Both messianic figures influenced the young artist's thinking.

In the few years following art school Jaray was awarded two traveling scholarships. In 1960 she received the Abbey Minor Traveling Scholarship to Italy. Here Jaray experienced for the first time the impact of Italian Architecture, as well as the art she had gone there to see. The following year in 1961 she received the French Government Scholarship, which allowed her to return to France to live and work for some months. While in Paris she worked in the etching studio of Stanley William Hayter at Atelier 17.

== Technique and teaching ==
The impact of Renaissance architectural spaces Jaray encountered on her travels in Italy were formative for the development of her distinctive technique. In these ceilings she saw how simple lines interacted to transform space, powerfully inducing emotional responses. Writing on Jaray's paintings of the 1960s Jasia Reichardt said they could be called "'ceiling geography' because they suggest views of an interior seen from below... Her paintings suggest some underlying mystery through the suggestion of architectural perspective". Much of her career as a painter has been spent investigating the quality of effects geometry, pattern, repetition and colour have on space. The patterns she creates evoke spatial ambiguities and shifting structures which work on the viewer's perceptions in subtle ways. According to the critic Terry Pitts, her work "sense(s) the way in which history of decoration and patterning is embedded with elemental human experiences and impulses". At this time of significant development, in 1964 Jaray began teaching. For four years she taught at Hornsey College of Art, before becoming the first female teacher at the Slade in 1968. In 1999 Jaray became Reader Emeritus in Fine Art at the Slade.

== Public commissions ==
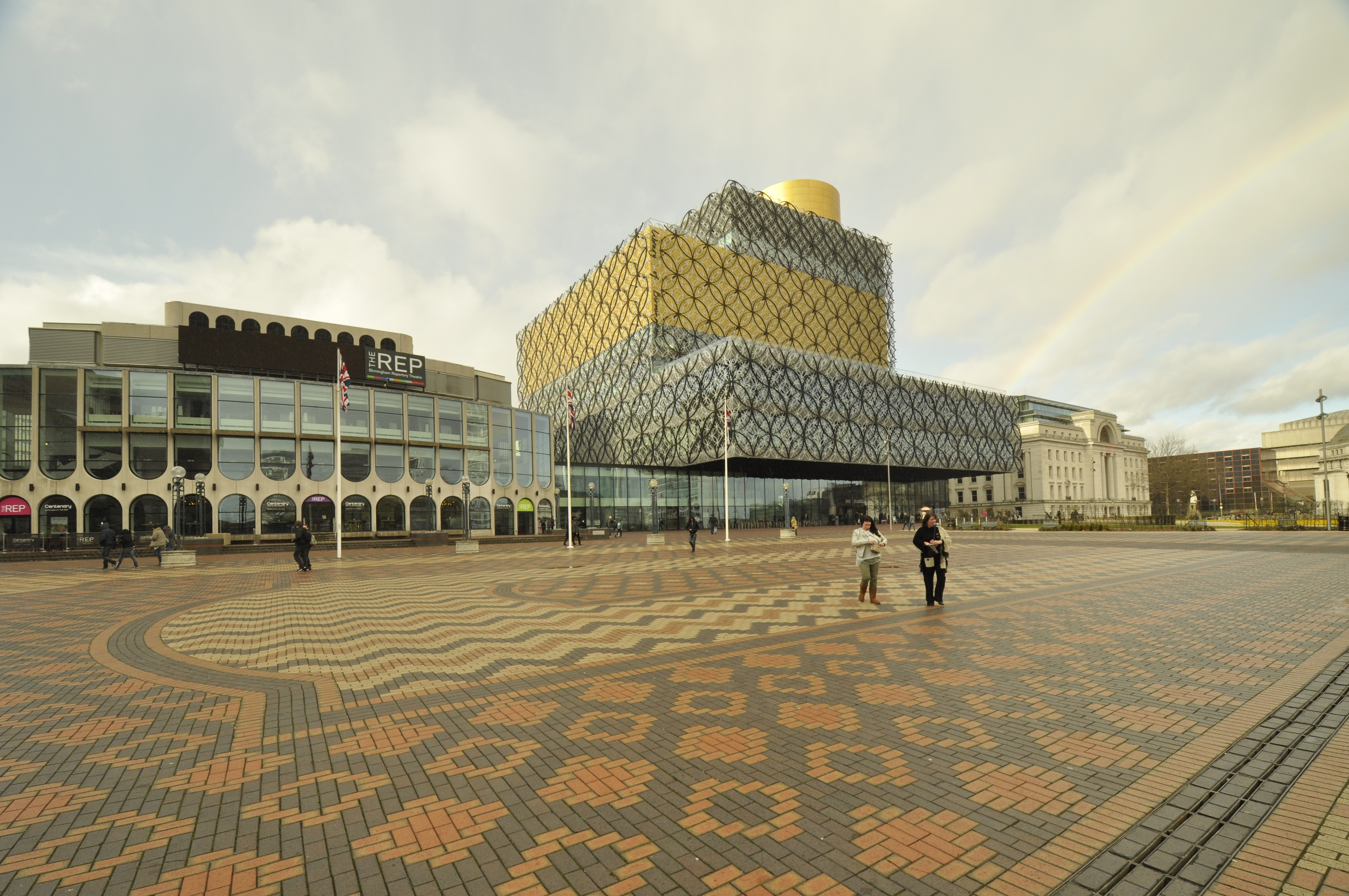
Jaray's paving design, in Centenary Square, Birmingham

Between 1985 and 2000 Jaray devoted much of her time to working on public commissions, applying her understanding of architectural space and pattern to large-scale projects in public spaces. Her significant work of the nineteen eighties was a terrazzo pattern design for London Victoria train station. In the nineties she completed further large-scale public projects including paving, lamps and railings in Centenary Square, Birmingham (torn up in 2018); Wakefield Cathedral Precinct; Jubilee Square at Leeds General Infirmary; and the forecourt for the new British Embassy in Moscow.

== Exhibitions ==
Jaray's work was included in the 2021 exhibition Women in Abstraction at the Centre Pompidou.

== Writing ==
Throughout her career Jaray used writing as a way to reflect upon her work. However, from the mid-1990s Jaray started increasingly to write about other artists' work. Several of these pieces have appeared as catalogue essays for exhibitions and on BBC Radio 3's The Essay. In 2001 Jaray collaborated with the German writer W.G. Sebald to realise an exhibition and book. FROM THE RINGS OF SATURN AND VERTIGO at Purdy Hicks Gallery, London presented sixteen pairings of Jaray's visual response to fragments from Sebald's novels The Rings of Saturn and Vertigo. Later that year twenty-three of the writer's micropoems were brought together with Jaray's paintings in For Years Now. It was published by Short Books in London shortly before Sebald's death in December of that year. A selection of Jaray's essays and reflections on art and life were collected in Painting: Mysteries & Confessions published in 2010 by Lenz Books.

== Honours ==
In 1995, Jaray was made Honorary Fellow of the Royal Institute for British Architects (RIBA) in recognition of her public art commissions.

In 2010, Jaray was elected a Royal Academician.

In 2017, Norwich University of the Arts awarded her an honorary degree in recognition of her outstanding achievements in fine art and art education.

In 2025, the University of the Arts London awarded her an honorary doctorate.

== Personal life and death ==
Jaray lived and worked in London. She married the painter Marc Vaux in 1960; they were divorced in 1982. They had two daughters.

Tess Jaray died from a fall on 24 May 2026, at the age of 88.

== Public collections ==
- Abbot Hall Art Gallery, Kendal, UK
- Arts Council Collection, London, UK
- Art Gallery of Western Australia, Perth, Australia
- British Council, London, UK
- British Museum, London, UK
- Brooklyn Museum
- Contemporary Art Society, London, UK
- Fogg Art Museum, Harvard University, MA, US
- Sainsbury Centre for Visual Arts, Norwich, UK
- Sheffield Museums, Sheffield, UK,
- The Tate, London, UK
- Victoria and Albert Museum, London, UK
- University of Warwick Art Collection, Coventry, UK
- Walker Art Gallery, Liverpool, UK

== Publications ==
- 2003, Mel Gooding, Tess Jaray's New Paintings, catalogue essay for exhibition at Purdy Hicks Gallery, London.
- 2005 Kim Williams and Judith Flagg Moran, Urban Space and Pavements: The work of the Cosmati, Carlo Scarpa and Tess Jaray, Lettera Matematice 55. Also published in Mathematics and Culture, ed. Michele Emmer, publisher Springe.
- 2007, Oliver Bennett, Surface Tension, Landscape, 06/01/07.
- 2008, Tess Jaray, Jeongae Im, Art price no 6 vol 56
- 2009, Contemporary Crafts. English Case Study, Birmingham Imogen Racz, published by Berg Publishers.
- 2010, 'Painting: Mysteries and Confessions', Review, Times Literary Supplement, 02/05/10, Nancy Campbell.
- 2010, Brian Sewell, 10.06.10, Oh, no..., Evening Standard, London.
- 2010, Marius Granger: Tess Jaray, Catalogue Introduction for Layers, Seongnam Cultural Foundation, Korea.
- 2014, The Art of Tess Jaray. London, UK: Ridinghouse. ISBN 978-1-905464-80-7
- 2016, Desire Lines: The Public Art of Tess Jaray. London, UK: Ridinghouse. ISBN 978-1-909932-25-8
- 2010, Painting: Mysteries and Confessions. UK: Lenz Books. ISBN 978-0-9564760-1-2
