= A Place in the Country =

A Place in the Country may refer to:

- A Place in the Country (essay collection), a 1998 book by W. G. Sebald
- A Place in the Country (album), a 1986 album by Bill Anderson
- A Place in the Country (novel) a 1969 novel by Sarah Gainham
