= Hans Erich Nossack =

German writer (1901–1977)

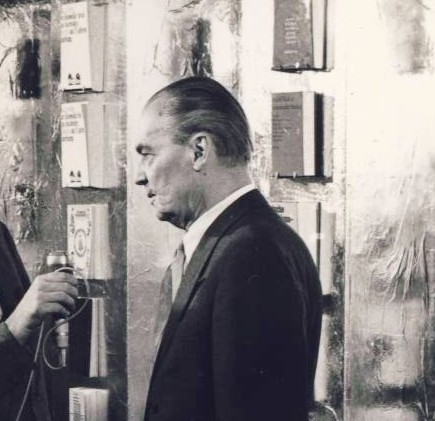
Nossack at the Frankfurt Book Fair 1969

Hans Erich Nossack (30 January 1901 – 2 November 1977) was a German writer. Among his works are An Offering for the Dead (1947), Spätestens im November (1955), Der jüngere Bruder (1958) and Ein glücklicher Mensch (1975). In 1961 Nossack was awarded the Georg Büchner Prize. One of his most famous works is The End: Hamburg 1943, written 3 months after the bombing of Hamburg by the allies during the Second World War. W. G. Sebald, in his book On the Natural History of Destruction wrote, "Indeed, it seems that no German writer, with the exception of Nossack, was ready or able to put any concrete facts down on paper about the progress or repercussions of this gigantic, long-term campaign of destruction." In 2006, when The End was published for the first time in English, by the University of Chicago Press, Publishers Weekly wrote that "Nossack's remarkable witnessing has real and urgent value."

== Awards (selection) ==
- Georg Büchner Prize 1961
