= Rein Gold =

First edition

rein GOLD. ein bühnenessay is a prose work by Elfriede Jelinek, the Austrian winner of the Nobel Prize in Literature in 2004, published in 2013 by Rowohlt Verlag. On 9 March 2014 its world premiere as an opera was staged by Staatsoper Berlin.

rein GOLD is cast in dialogic form at the opening of which Brünnhilde diagnoses her father Wotan to be a victim of capitalism because he, too, has fallen into the trap of wanting to own a castle he cannot afford ("This happens in every second family."). In a stream of consciousness the narrator touches on a number of events from the days of the Nibelungen Saga to the recent international financial crisis caused by the U.S. Subprime mortgage crisis and the role of banks therein.

== Background of the work and its title ==
The title echoes Rheingold (The Rhine Gold, 1869) which is the first of four operas in Richard Wagner's opera cycle Der Ring des Nibelungen. In Jelinek's sarcastic phonetic pun, the letter "h" in the first word of the title is dropped. This turns the name of the river Rhine into an adjective, "rein", meaning "pure".

Among others, the work is inspired by the mid-nineteenth-century revolution in Vienna (as studied in a publication by Hermann Jellinek in 1848); by The Communist Manifesto of Karl Marx and Friedrich Engels (published in London in 1848); by Marx's Das Kapital (1867-1894); and by Richard Wagner's opera cycle Der Ring des Nibelungen (1848-1874) and a recent study thereof by law expert Wolfgang Schild entitled Staatsdämmerung (2007).

rein GOLD was suggested to Jelinek by Bayerische Staatsoper München.

An English translation by Gitta Honegger was published by Fitzcarraldo Editions in 2021.

== Editions ==
rein GOLD. ein bühnenessay. Hardcover, 223 p., Rowohlt, Reinbek bei Hamburg 2013, ISBN 978-3-498-03339-2
