= Einar Schleef =

German director and novelist (1944–2001)

Einar Schleef (17 January 1944 – 21 July 2001) was a German actor, director, dramatist, novelist, painter, photographer, and set designer.

== Life ==
Schleef was born and raised in Sangerhausen, a small town in the South East of Germany. An industrial landscape shaped by mining and surrounded by the mythical landscapes of Harz and Kyffhäuser.

His father, Wilhelm Schleef, was an architect; his mother, Gertrud Schleef, worked as a seamstress. He had one sibling, Hans Schleef.

== Career ==
Schleef started to train as a painter while he was still in school. He attended a socialist painting circle led by Wilhelm Schmied from 1958 onwards. In 1964, he started a degree in fine arts at the arts academy in Berkin's Weißensee quarter. After being expelled in 1965, Schleef switched to set design two years later and finished with a bachelor's degree in 1973.

From 1972 to 1975, he worked mainly for the Berliner Ensemble with its artistic director Ruth Berghaus. He co-directed three productions with B.K. Traglehn (Katzgraben in 1972, Frühlings Erwachen in 1974, Fräulein Julie in 1975).

Even though artistically successful, Schleef was put under more and more political pressure. In 1976, he left East Germany and via Vienna finally settled down in West Germany. From then on, Schleef produced more and more text. Already from 1953 onwards, he wrote journals and he continued this practice till his death.

In the 1980s, he wrote the novel Gertrud, portraying the life of his mother. He also wrote plays, radio plays and more fiction. From 1978 to 1982, he studied filmmaking at the DFFB in West Berlin.

Schleef returned to theatre in 1985 when he became a steady director at Schauspiel Frankfurt. In the following five years, he developed his theatre vision. He re-introduced the choir as a dramatis personæ and celebrated the tragic potential of the classic, ancient text. This theatre work was controversially received. Audiences as well as critics varied between harsh criticism and very positive feedback.

Through the 1990s, he continued to produce a number of successful and influential productions, including Wessis in Weimar by Rolf Hochhuth in 1993 at the Berliner Ensemble; Puntila by Bertolt Brecht in 1995 at the Berliner Ensemble. He directed as well as acted in Puntila.

Another production is Ein Sportstück by Elfriede Jelinek in 1998 at Burgtheater Wien; and his final piece as a director, Verratenes Volk, using texts by John Milton, Nietzsche, Dwinger and Alfred Döblin in 2000 at Deutsches Theater in Berlin.

The last phase of his theatre work was accompanied by the work on his epic theatre essay "Droge, Faust, Parsifal" published in 1997.

== Death ==
Schleef died in Berlin on 21 July 2001 due to a heart disease. He is buried in Sangerhausen.

== Publications ==
- Harald Müller, Wolfgang Behrens: Kontaktbögen. Fotografie 1965–2001, Akademie der Künste Berlin, 2001 ISBN 3-934344-58-5
- Gabriele Gerecke, Harald Müller, Hans Ulrich Müller-Schwefe: Einar Schleef Arbeitsbuch, Berlin, 2002. ISBN 3-934344-12-7
- Alexander Kluge: Einar Schleef – der Feuerkopf spricht. (Hg. Christian Schulte & Reinald Gußmann). Facts & Fakes, Band 5. Vorwerk 8, Berlin, 2003. ISBN 3-930916-59-2
- Michael Freitag, Katja Schneider: Einar Schleef. Der Maler, Köln, 2008, ISBN 978-3-8321-9089-7

== Awards and honors ==
- 1995 Mülheimer Dramatikerpreis

== See also ==
- List of novelists
- List of people from Berlin
- List of playwrights
- List of theatre directors
