= Women as Lovers =

Women as Lovers may refer to:

- Women as Lovers (album), a 2008 album by Xiu Xiu
- Women as Lovers (novel), a 1975 novel by Elfriede Jelinek
