= Der Tod und das Mädchen II =

Der Tod und das Mädchen II is a play by the Nobel Prize winning Austrian playwright Elfriede Jelinek. It premiered in Hanover, Germany, in 2000. It was published that year in a combined volume with two other Jelinek plays, Das Lebewohl (The Departure) and Das Schweigen (Silence). All three plays referenced German classical music composers.
