= The Piano Teacher (Jelinek novel) =

Novel by Elfriede Jelinek

- First edition
- Author: Elfriede Jelinek
- Original title: Die Klavierspielerin
- Language: German
- Subject: Repression, sadomasochism
- Genre: Novel
- Set in: Vienna, 1980s
- Publisher: Rowohlt
- Publication date: 1983
- Publication place: Austria
- Media type: Print (Hardcover & Paperback)
- ISBN: 3639135970
- Dewey Decimal: 833.91

The Piano Teacher (German: Die Klavierspielerin [diː klaˈviːɐ̯ˌʃpiːləʁɪn]; transl. "The Piano Player [f.]") is a novel by Austrian Nobel Prize winner Elfriede Jelinek, first published in 1983 by Rowohlt Verlag. Translated by Joachim Neugroschel, it was the first of Jelinek's novels to be translated into English.

The novel follows protagonist Erika Kohut (German: [ˈeːʁika ˈkoːhʊt]), a sexually and emotionally repressed piano teacher, as she enters into a sadomasochistic relationship with her student, Walter Klemmer (German: [ˈvaltɐ ˈklɛmɐ]), the results of which are disastrous. Like much of Jelinek's work, the chronology of the events in the book is interwoven with images of the past and the internal thoughts of characters.

While the English work was titled The Piano Teacher, the title in German means the piano player; it is also clear that the player is female because of the noun's feminine ending.

In 2001, the novel was adapted into the film The Piano Teacher, directed by Michael Haneke.

== Plot synopsis ==
The novel follows Erika Kohut, a piano teacher in her late thirties who teaches at the Vienna Conservatory and still lives in an apartment with her very controlling elderly mother, with whom Erika shares her parents' marriage bed, despite having a room of her own. The very strained relationship between Erika and her mother is made clear in the opening scene, in which Erika rips out some of her mother's hair when her mother attempts to take away a new dress that Erika has purchased for herself. Erika's mother wishes the money to be used toward a new, future apartment with her, and resents Erika's spending of her money on possessions distinctly for herself; her mother cannot wear Erika's clothing. Erika herself does not wear it, but merely strokes it admiringly at night.

Erika expresses this latent violence as well as need for control in many other scenes throughout the book. Erika takes large instruments on trains so that she can hit people with them and call it an accident, or kicks or steps on the feet of other passengers so that she can watch them blame someone else. She is a voyeur who frequents peep shows, and on one occasion catches a couple having sex in a park, being so affected that she urinates. Childhood memories are retold throughout the novel and their effects on the present suggested—for instance, the memory of a childhood visit from her cousin, an attractive and athletic young man, whom Erika's mother praised while she makes her daughter practice piano, results in Erika's self-mutilation.

Walter Klemmer, an engineering student, is introduced very early on. He comes early to class and watches Erika perform. He eventually becomes Erika's student and develops a desire for his instructor. Erika sees love as a means of rebellion or escape from her mother and thus seeks complete control in the relationship, always telling Klemmer carefully what he must do to her, although she is a sexual masochist. The tensions build within the relationship as Klemmer finds himself more and more uncomfortable by the control, and eventually Klemmer beats and rapes Erika in her own apartment, her mother in the next room. When Erika visits Klemmer after the rape and finds him laughing and happy, she stabs herself in the shoulder and returns home.

== Reception ==
According to Larson Powell and Brenda Bethman, musicality is a very important aspect of the book: they argue that Jelinek (herself a former student of the Vienna Conservatory) uses musicality to underscore the perversity of the main character, who participates in a musical tradition that trains women to play the piano in order to attract a husband. Erika's failure as a pianist is a sign of her perversion: both the pervert and the artist attain pleasure, but where the artist reaches pleasure as a sublimity, thus becoming a desiring subject, the pervert fails to achieve subjectivity and remains bound to object status. Thus, Erika remains the object of her mother's desire, unable to attain subjectivity which the principles of her musical education had denied her in the first place.

Other criticism has been directed toward the lack of a father figure within the novel. Just as much as Erika's mother is suffocatingly present, so is her father noticeably absent. This provides her mother with sole psychological discretion as to Erika's upbringing. Worth noting is that:

"the mother's power and influence increase with the absence of the father, who is admitted to an asylum and spatially exiled. Aside from the fact that the exclusive bond between mother and daughter remains uninterrupted and maternal domination obstructed, his displacement suggests the cause for Erika's failed separation from the mother and her excessive masochistic drive."

Critic Beatrice Hanssen refers to the novel as "an anti-Bildungsroman and anti-Künstlerroman" and writes further that The Piano Teacher is a "satirical critique...of the literature, popular during the 1970s and 1980s, that idealized the pre-oedipal mother-daughter bond."
