= The Children of the Dead =

Novel by Elfriede Jelinek

First edition

The Children of the Dead (German: Die Kinder der Toten) is a novel by Elfriede Jelinek, first published in 1995 by Rowohlt Verlag. It is commonly regarded as her magnum opus. The novel won the Literaturpreis der Stadt Bremen in 1996. The prologue and epilogue were translated into English by Louise E. Stoehr in 1998, while a full English translation by Gitta Honegger was published by Yale University Press in 2024.

Next to Jelinek's novel Neid, The Children of the Dead is her longest work. Although it can be classified as a postmodern horror novel, Jelinek herself calls it a "ghost story written in the tradition of the Gothic novel." In announcing the publication of the translation, Yale University Press described it as "a spectral journey through the catastrophic history embedded in the landscape of Austria [...]. Concocted from experimental theater, splatter film, Gothic literature, philosophy, religion, and more, Jelinek’s phantasmagorical masterwork is a fierce confrontation with our fraught legacies in the name of the innocent dead".

The novel constitutes an intensive examination of the memory and suppression of the Holocaust. Along with this goes an associative mode of writing which incorporates plays on words and constantly disrupts linear narration through looping and repeated narrative strands.

In a review for the Washington Post, Dustin Illingworth called the novel "a savage reckoning with the Holocaust; an indictment of consumer culture; a compilation of ghastly erotica replete with undead orgies; an erudite display of Joycean wordplay; and a relentlessly bleak portrait of the human capacity for self-deception."

John Semley wrote in The Nation that "Jelinek’s prose is dense, chock-full of localisms and bits of political history, and riven with that most Germanic form of humor, die Wortspiele — puns, basically." He went on to say that "is a tale of death, disgust, and despair. But it’s no bummer; it is playful and proudly strange. And it offers a forceful riposte to a culture—one both historical and contemporary—that abjures the buried and the bygone. Its raw pessimism invigorates, even when it risks feeling totally exhausting."

== Plot ==
The novel is unusual amongst literary works in German in that all the characters are undead in the process of decomposition and are presented as mute zombies in the manner of splatter films. Of these undead protagonists, the three primary are Gudrun Bichler, Edgar Gstranz and Karin Frenzel; they are incapable of speech, obsessed with sex, and brutal. They are confronted with the mass of Holocaust victims, who wish to achieve new life by means of the couple, Gudrun and Edgar; however their plan fails since Gudrun and Edgar are likewise undead. The setting dissolves into a sea of mud.

== Adaptations ==
In 2019, directors Kelly Copper and Pavol Liska collaborated on a feature film adaptation, Die Kinder der Toten, in a comedy horror style.
