= Vertigo (Sebald novel) =

1990 novel by W. G. Sebald

- First edition (German)
- Author: W. G. Sebald
- Original title: Schwindel. Gefühle.
- Translator: Michael Hulse
- Language: German
- Genre: Diary, Memoir, Biography, Fiction
- Publisher: Eichborn
- Publication date: 1990
- Publication place: Germany
- Media type: Print (Hardback & Paperback)
- Pages: 298
- ISBN: 3-8218-4063-3
- OCLC: 23177054
- Dewey Decimal: 833.914
- LC Class: PT2681.E18 S313

Vertigo (German: Schwindel. Gefühle., "Dizziness. Feelings.") is a 1990 novel, the first by German author W. G. Sebald. The first of its four sections, titled 'Beyle, or Love is a Madness Most Discreet', is a short but conventional biography of Stendhal, who is referred to not by his pen name but by his birth name of Beyle. The second, 'All'estero', is a travelogue of two journeys made to the Alpine region by an unnamed narrator whose biography resembles Sebald's; a meeting with poet Ernst Herbeck, a dream that reminds him of Tiepolo's depiction of Este, and an episode from the life of Casanova are also featured. The third, 'Dr K Takes the Waters at Riva', describes a difficult period in the life of Franz Kafka, referred to only as "Dr. K." Kafka's short story The Hunter Gracchus is re-told in summary form and the meaning of the hunter's ceaseless voyage interpreted by the narrator as Kafka's penitence for a longing for love. The fourth, 'Il ritorno in patria', is a nostalgic recounting of the narrator's visit to his German hometown of "W," a rural village which he has not seen for decades. The narrator recalls one of the town's residents, Hans Schlag the huntsman, who, falling to his death, suffers the same fate as the huntsman in Kafka's short story.

Sebald makes notable use of leitmotif, such as sensations of dizziness as suggested in the title, and deceased persons lying covered on platforms. The novel functions along with Sebald's two subsequent works, The Emigrants and The Rings of Saturn, as a trilogy. All three works were translated into English by Michael Hulse in partnership with Sebald.

== Reception ==
Stephen Moss of The Guardian found the book difficult to characterize, but embraced it critically.

A path in Wertach, the village of Sebald's birth, features six stelae with passages from Il Ritorno in Patria, the last section of the book, tracing aspects of the walk from Oberjoch to "W.", over 12 kilometers.

== See also ==
- 1990 in literature
- German literature
