= Burgtheater. Posse mit Gesang =

Burgtheater. Posse mit Gesang is a play by Austrian playwright Elfriede Jelinek. It was first published in 1985. The play depicts scenes from the lives of well-known actors at the Burgtheater in Vienna and reveals some of the actors as "shallow, petty tyrants." The play also make allegations about the theater's past collaboration with the Nazi regime.
