= Michael Hulse =

English poet, translator and critic

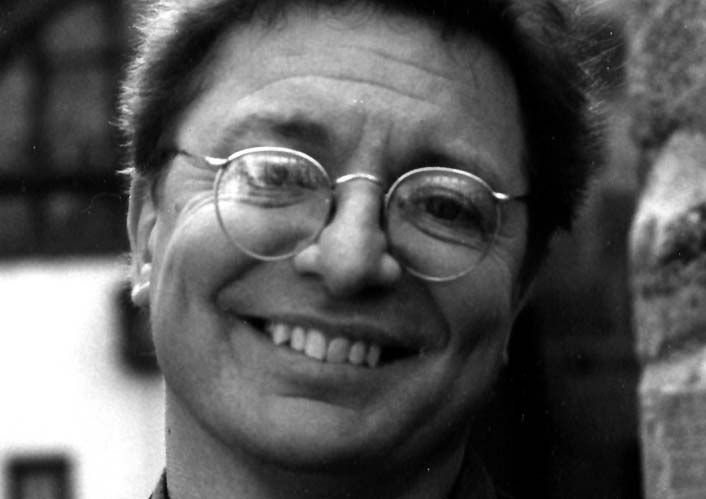
Photograph of Michael Hulse, from Salt Publishing

Michael Hulse (born 1955) is an English poet, translator and critic, notable especially for his translations of German novels by W. G. Sebald, Herta Müller, and Elfriede Jelinek.

== Life and works ==
Hulse was educated locally in Stoke-on-Trent until the age of sixteen, when his family moved to Germany. From 1973 to 1977 he studied at the University of St Andrews, where he graduated with a first-class M.A. Hons in German. From 1977 to 1979 he taught at the University of Erlangen, and from 1981 to 1983 at the Catholic University of Eichstätt, dividing the intervening period between England and South East Asia.

Following two years in Durham and Oxford (1983–85) he returned to Germany, where he chiefly worked freelance in Cologne for Deutsche Welle television and in publishing (1985–2002). Most of his work as translator, both of German literature, including works by W. G. Sebald, Johann Wolfgang von Goethe, Rainer Maria Rilke, Elfriede Jelinek, and Jakob Wassermann, and of art criticism, belongs to these years, and he was general editor of the Könemann literature classics series. In this period he also lectured and led workshops and seminars at universities, sometimes for the British Council, and from 1999 to 2002 led a four-year translation project in Ethiopia for the Goethe Institut. For two years (1999–2000) he co-edited the literary quarterly Stand with John Kinsella, and from 2001 to 2004 he was co-director with David Hartnett of the small press Leviathan Press and editor of Leviathan Quarterly.

Since 2002 Hulse has taught poetry and comparative literature at the University of Warwick, where in 2007 he established The Warwick Review, a quarterly magazine of international writing, of which Sean O'Brien wrote: "in scope and seriousness it offers a useful model for a contemporary literary-cultural magazine [...] Curiosity, imagination and readiness to encounter the unfamiliar are qualities The Warwick Review asks of the reader, and in turn does much to embody" (Times Literary Supplement, 30 October 2009). In 2007 he co-organized with Warwick colleague Eileen John a major international conference on poetry and philosophy at which the guest poets were Geoffrey Hill (UK); Jorie Graham, Susan Stewart and John Koethe (US); Robert Bringhurst and Jan Zwicky (Canada); and Robert Gray and Kevin Hart (Australia). With Donald Singer, Professor of Clinical Pharmacology at Warwick, he established the Hippocrates initiative in 2009, which awards the annual Hippocrates Prize for poetry on a medical subject and convenes an annual international symposium. In 2011 the initiative won a Times Higher Education Award for Excellence and Innovation in the Arts.

== Poetry ==
Hulse began publishing in national magazines in 1976, and won the first (1978) National Poetry Competition, judged by Ted Hughes, Fleur Adcock and Gavin Ewart, with his poem 'Dole Queue'. Other awards include an Eric Gregory Award (1980) and a Cholmondeley Award (1991). He is the only poet to have won the Bridport Poetry Prize twice, in 1988 and 1993. He has held residential fellowships at Hawthornden Castle, Scotland (twice); the Château de Lavigny, Switzerland; and the European Translators' College, Straelen, Germany.

His overseas reading tours have included Canada, 1985; New Zealand, 1991; Canada, 1991; Australia, 1992; India, 1995; Australia, 1999; Canada, 2002; United States, 2003; Mexico, 2010; United States, 2010; Australia and New Zealand, 2012; as well as numerous events in various European countries.

== University Challenge ==
In 2017, Michael Hulse appeared in an edition of Christmas University Challenge, representing the University of St. Andrews.

== Selected bibliography ==
=== Poetry ===
- Dole Queue (The White Friar Press, 1981)
- Knowing and Forgetting (Secker & Warburg, 1981) (ISBN 0-436-20965-9)
- Propaganda (Secker & Warburg, 1985) (ISBN 0-436-20966-7)
- Eating Strawberries in the Necropolis (Harvill, 1991) (ISBN 0-00-272076-0)
- Mother of Battles (Arc, 1991) ISBN 0 946407 81 9
- Monteverdi's Photographs: nine poems on aesthetics (Folio, 1995) ISBN 0646243004
- Empires and Holy Lands: Poems 1976–2000 (Salt, 2002) (ISBN 1-876857-46-3)
- The Secret History (Arc, 2009) ISBN 978-1-906570-24-8 (paperback), ISBN 978-1-906570-25-5 (hardback))
- Half Life (Arc, 2013) ISBN 978-1908376-19-0 (pbk), ISBN 978-1908376-20-6 (hbk)

=== Translations ===
- The Sorrows of Young Werther by Goethe (1989)
- Wonderful, Wonderful Times by Elfriede Jelinek (1990) (ISBN 1-85242-168-1)
- Lust by Elfriede Jelinek (1992) (ISBN 1-85242-183-5)
- Caspar Hauser: The Inertia of the Heart by Jakob Wassermann (1992)
- The Emigrants by W. G. Sebald (1997) (ISBN 0-8112-1366-8)
- The Rings of Saturn by W. G. Sebald (1998) (ISBN 0-8112-1413-3)
- Vertigo by W. G. Sebald (2000) (ISBN 0-8112-1430-3)
- The Appointment (with Philip Boehm) by Herta Müller (2001) (ISBN 978-0-312-42054-3)
- The Devil's Blind Spot (with Martin Chalmers) by Alexander Kluge (2007)
- The Notebooks of Malte Laurids Brigge by Rainer Maria Rilke (2009) (ISBN 978-0141182216)
- Thus Spake Zarathustra by Friedrich Nietzsche (2022)

=== Edited ===
- The New Poetry, with David Kennedy and David Morley (Bloodaxe Books, 1993) (ISBN 1-85224-244-2)
- The 20th Century in Poetry, with Simon Rae (Ebury Press, 2011, and Pegasus Press, 2012) (ISBN 978-0091940171)

=== Miscellaneous ===
- Charles Simic in conversation with Michael Hulse (2002) (ISBN 1-903291-03-8)

== See also ==
- Hippocrates Prize for Poetry and Medicine
