= Die Kontrakte des Kaufmanns. Eine Wirtschaftskomödie =

2009 play by Elfriede Jelinek

Die Kontrakte des Kaufmanns. Eine Wirtschaftskomödie is a play by Austrian playwright Elfriede Jelinek. It was first published in 2009.
