= Wonderful, Wonderful Times =

Novel by Elfriede Jelinek

First edition

Wonderful, Wonderful Times (German: Die Ausgesperrten) is a novel by Austrian writer Elfriede Jelinek, published in 1980 by Rowohlt Verlag. It is Jelinek's fifth book. An English translation by Michael Hulse was published in 1990 by Serpent's Tail. A film adaptation of the novel, The Excluded, was released in 1982.

== Plot and theme ==
The novel follows a group of four Viennese teens during the 1950s as they violently engage with the previous generation's Post-World War II legacy. The novel does not use traditional chapter demarcations and focuses largely on the internal thoughts of the characters. Through the portrayal of the Austrian family Witkowski, the reader is able to see the relation between daily fascism with the family and an undigested Austrian National Socialist history. The family patriarch, a former Nazi, makes up for his loss of power and one leg by terrorizing his family and sexually abusing his wife.

== Characters ==
=== Major characters ===
- Rainer Maria Witkowski: The 18-year-old protagonist of the book. He is a gymnasium student and the twin of Anna Witkowski.
- Anna Witkowski: The 18-year-old twin of Rainer Witkowski. She is also a gymnasium student and a pianist.
- Hans Sepp: A 20-something mechanic.
- Sophie Pachhofen: An 18-year-old rich, athletic gymnasium student.

=== Minor characters ===
- Otto Witkowski: The father of Anna and Rainer, once a SS officer and now an amputee.
- Margarethe Witkowski: The mother of Anna and Rainer.
- Ms. Sepp: The mother of Hans and a fervent Communist.
- Gerhard Schweiger: A gymnasium student with Anna, Rainer, and Sophie.
