= Lust (Jelinek novel) =

Novel by Elfriede Jelinek

First edition (publ. Rowohlt Verlag)

Lust is a novel by Austrian author Elfriede Jelinek. Originally published in German in 1989, it was translated into English in 1992 by Michael Hulse.

== Plot ==
Lust tells the story of Hermann, a manager of a paper mill, and his wife, Gerti, whom he abuses sexually on a daily basis. They have a son together. Taken to drink, Gerti wanders into a nearby ski resort, where she has a brute encounter with Michael, a self-centered student and hopeful politician. Michael discards her for younger women he seduces regularly. Gerti takes these actions, however, for love and leaves to have her hair done. Later, she returns to find Michael skiing. He abuses her physically in front of a crowd of younger people. Disappointed and disillusioned, Gerti returns home and drowns her son in a nearby stream.

== Critical response ==
The novel is, like all of Jelinek's novels, lyrical and musical in its structure and features sexual and physical violence. Lust attracted a great deal of controversy upon publication, with many reviewers arguing that the novel is pornography. Critics have noted that "only first names are used to signify the characters. The deletion of the last name of the factory owner and husband Hermann, and his wife and sexual object, Gerti, demonstrates the interchangeability of the characters." The book has been described as a literary culmination of Jelinek's "aesthetics of the obscene."

An excerpt from Lust, accompanied by a short essay, was published in a pro-pornography collection edited by Claudia Gehrke called Frauen & Pornografie (Women & Pornography) in 1988; that same year, Jelinek also contributed to the Emma campaign for an anti-pornography law that would reverse the 1975 reform of criminal law, which liberalized paragraph 184 and "effectively legalized pornography in Germany." Critics have argued that these actions are not "so much indicative of a theoretical indecisiveness on her part as it is of an implicit diacritical principle or norm on the basis of which she seeks to separate a male, exploitative pornography from its female reinterpretation."

Jelinek stated that she set out to write an "erotic, indeed pornographic, novel from a woman's point of view," but found it impossible because the "brutalized language used to describe sex was a purely male language of exploitation."
