= An Offering for the Dead =

1947 novel by Hans Erich Nossack

- Author: Hans Erich Nossack
- Original title: Nekyia
- Language: German
- Publisher: Wolfgang Krüger
- Publication date: 1947
- Publication place: West Germany
- English publication date: 1992
- Pages: 143

An Offering for the Dead (German: Nekyia. Bericht eines Überlebenden, lit. 'Nekyia: Report of a Survivor') is a 1947 novel by the German writer Hans Erich Nossack. It follows the lone survivor of an unexplained doomsday event as he wakes up with amnesia in an empty city and struggles with identity and dreams. It was Nossack's debut novel and published by Wolfgang Krüger in Hamburg.

Written from 1943 to 1946, the book uses magic realist techniques to process the experience of indiscriminate bombings of German cities during World War II. Nossack had witnessed and survived the bombing of Hamburg, his hometown. The same experience was the basis for his autobiographical essay The End: Hamburg 1943, published in 1948. Nekyia—the original title of An Offering for the Dead—is an ancient Greek word for a necromantic rite.

When An Offering for the Dead was published in English in 1992, Publishers Weekly called it a "hypnotic short novel" that "testifies to an extraordinary artistic sensibility" and avoids becoming self-indulgent through its "disciplined prose style". The scholar Torsten Hoffmann calls it one of Nossack's most complex works and groups it with The City beyond the River by Hermann Kasack, with which it shares a post-war "transcendence of contemporary history".
