= On the Natural History of Destruction =

1999 book by W. G. Sebald

- Book cover
- Author: W. G. Sebald
- Original title: Luftkrieg und Literatur
- Translator: Anthea Bell
- Language: German
- Publisher: Carl Hanser Verlag
- Publication date: 1999
- Publication place: Germany
- English publication date: 2003
- Pages: 165
- ISBN: 3-446-19661-7

On the Natural History of Destruction is a 1999 book by the German writer W. G. Sebald. Its original German title is Luftkrieg und Literatur, which means "Air war and literature". It consists of essays about literature and writers, through which Sebald discusses the German processing of World War II.

== Contents ==
- "Air War and Literature", on the meagre portrayal in culture of the bombings of German cities during World War II
- "Between the Devil and the Deep Blue Sea", on Alfred Andersch
- "Against the Irreversible", on Jean Améry
- "The Remorse of the Heart", on the works of Peter Weiss

== Publication ==
The book was published in Munich in 1999 through Carl Hanser Verlag. The German edition features the long titular essay and the one on Andersch. In 2003 the book was published in an English translation by Anthea Bell, to which the shorter essays on Améry and Weiss were added.

== Reception ==
John Banville reviewed the book for The Guardian: "On the Natural History of Destruction is a quietly spoken but fierce protest at the mendacity and moral evasiveness of our time. In the tragic absence of more Sebald fiction, it will have to do. One can do no better than to say of Sebald's work what he himself quotes Elias Canetti saying of the diary, 'notable for precision and responsibility', of a survivor of Hiroshima: 'If there were any point in wondering what form of literature is essential to a thinking, seeing human being today, then it is this.'" Kenneth Baker of the San Francisco Chronicle wrote: "Sebald's matter-of-fact evocation of the wartime events on which his collection turns make sickening reading. He relies on the written recollections of a few contemporary witnesses, notably Hans Erich Nossack and Alexander Kluge but offers long descriptions of the terrible events in his own even voice." Baker ended the review: "On the Natural History of Destruction leaves an aftertaste of sadness that flows from both its own bleak reflections and the knowledge that Sebald's indispensable voice has been silenced."

== See also ==
- 1999 in literature
- German literature
