= The Piano Teacher (film) =

2001 film by Michael Haneke

- Theatrical release poster
- French: La Pianiste
- Directed by: Michael Haneke
- Screenplay by: Michael Haneke
- Based on: The Piano Teacher by Elfriede Jelinek
- Produced by: Veit Heiduschka
- Starring: Isabelle Huppert; Annie Girardot; Benoît Magimel
- Cinematography: Christian Berger
- Edited by: Mona Willi; Nadine Muse
- Music by: Martin Achenbach
- Production companies: MK2; Les Films Alain Sarde; Wega Film; Arte France Cinéma
- Distributed by: MK2 Diffusion (France); Filmladen (Austria)
- Release dates: 14 May 2001 (Cannes); 5 September 2001 (France); 16 November 2001 (Austria)
- Running time: 131 minutes
- Countries: France; Austria
- Languages: French; German
- Budget: €5.3 million ($6.2 million)
- Box office: $6.8 million

The Piano Teacher (French: La Pianiste, lit. 'The (Female) Pianist') is a 2001 erotic psychological drama film written and directed by Michael Haneke, based on the 1983 novel of the same name by Elfriede Jelinek. It tells the story of an unmarried piano teacher (Isabelle Huppert) at a Vienna conservatory, living with her mother (Annie Girardot) in a state of emotional and sexual disequilibrium, who enters into a sadomasochistic relationship with her student (Benoît Magimel). The film was a co-production between France and Austria. Haneke was given the opportunity to direct after previous attempts to adapt the novel by filmmakers Valie Export and Paulus Manker failed for financial reasons.

At the 2001 Cannes Film Festival, it won the Grand Prix, and the two leads, Huppert and Magimel, won Best Actress and Best Actor, respectively. It went on to receive positive reviews and other awards and nominations.

== Plot ==
Erika Kohut is a piano professor at the Vienna Music Conservatory who resides in an apartment with her domineering elderly mother. Her late father had been a longstanding resident in a psychiatric asylum. Despite Erika's aloof and assured façade, she is a woman whose sexual repression and loneliness are manifested in her paraphilia, including voyeurism, sadomasochism, and self-harm.

At a recital hosted by the Blonskij couple, Erika meets Walter Klemmer, a young aspiring engineer who also plays piano, and who expresses admiration of her talent for classical music. The two share an appreciation for composers Robert Schumann and Franz Schubert, and he attempts to apply to the conservatory to be her pupil. His audition impresses the other professors, but Erika, though visibly moved by his playing, votes against him; she cites his divergent interpretation of the Andantino from Schubert's Sonata in A major, D. 959, and questions his motivations. Despite this, Walter is admitted as Erika's pupil. Meanwhile, another pupil, Anna Schober, struggles with anxiety while pushed by her own ambitious mother. When Erika witnesses Anna and Walter socialising, she slips to an empty coatroom and smashes a glass, hiding the shards inside one of Anna's coat pockets. This cuts Anna's right hand, preventing her from playing at the forthcoming jubilee concert. Erika claims she feels ill at the sight of blood and runs to the bathroom.

Walter follows Erika, climbs up and over her stall door, and unlocks it. He passionately kisses her and she responds by repeatedly humiliating and frustrating him. She proceeds to give him a handjob before performing fellatio on him, but abruptly stops when he does not abide by her orders to be silent and to look at her and not to touch her. She tells him she will write him a letter outlining her sexual rulebook for their next meeting. Later at the conservatory, Erika feigns sympathy for Anna's mother, who is distraught over her daughter’s injury. Anna’s mother asks who will fill in for her daughter at the forthcoming concert and Erika replies that she herself will play, as no student would play adequately on such short notice.

Walter is increasingly insistent in his desire to initiate a sexual relationship with Erika, but Erika is only willing if he will satisfy her masochistic fantasies. She gives him the letter indicating acts she will consent to. He follows her home and tries to seduce her but she is resistant. She allows him to come inside, where the pair is greeted by Erika’s disgruntled mother. In Erika’s bedroom, Walter attempts to seduce her once more but she insists that he read the letter. He reads the letter aloud, pausing to ask her questions or to get angry with her, while she remains silent. Erika retrieves a box of BDSM paraphernalia from under her bed and takes some of the items out. She asks Walter to think about her request. Walter tells her that she’s sick and he leaves. Later that night, while they lie in bed together, Erika's mother berates her for letting Walter into her bedroom in the middle of the night. Erika suddenly begins kissing and groping her mother. Her mother resists and tells Erika she is unwell.

Erika finds Walter at an ice rink after his ice hockey practice to apologise. She begins to subjugate herself to him in a janitorial closet. Walter says he loves her and they begin to have sex, but Erika is unable to, and vomits while performing fellatio. Later that night, Walter arrives at Erika's apartment and attacks her in the fashion described in her letter. He locks her mother away in her bedroom before proceeding to beat and rape Erika, despite her pleas for him to stop.

The next day, Erika brings a large kitchen knife to the concert where she is scheduled to substitute for Anna. When Walter arrives, he enters cheerfully, laughing with his family, and flippantly greets her. Moments before the concert is due to start, Erika calmly stabs herself in the shoulder with the kitchen knife and exits the concert hall into the street.

== Cast ==
- Isabelle Huppert as Erika Kohut
- Annie Girardot as the mother
- Benoît Magimel as Walter Klemmer
- Susanne Lothar as Mrs. Schober
- Anna Sigalevitch as Anna Schober
- Udo Samel as Dr. Blonskij
- Cornelia Köndgen as Mrs. Blonskij

== Production ==
=== Development ===
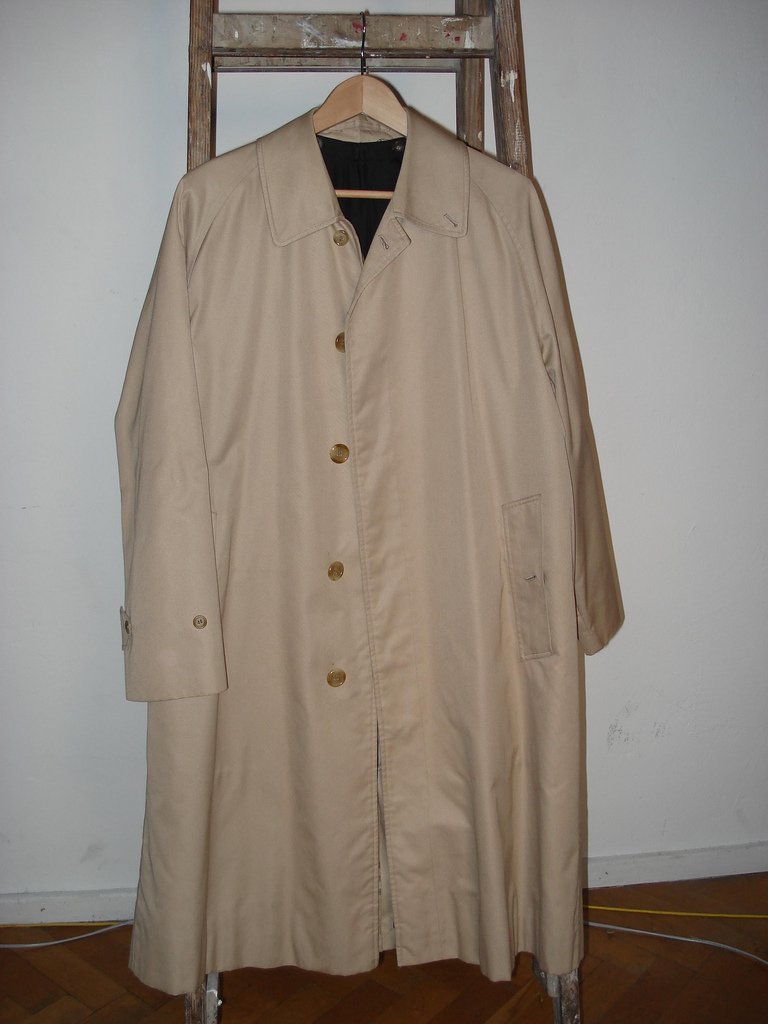
Erika is frequently seen wearing a Burberry car coat.

The film is based on the 1983 novel The Piano Teacher by Elfriede Jelinek, who won the 2004 Nobel Prize in Literature. Director Michael Haneke read The Piano Teacher when it was published and aspired to adapt it to transition from making television films to cinema. However, Haneke learned Jelinek and Valie Export had already adapted a screenplay, a project aborted due to lack of investment. Jelinek later abandoned hope for a film version before selling the rights to Paulus Manker, who asked Haneke to adapt the screenplay, though Haneke would not be the director. Manker did not secure a budget, so the producer asked Haneke to direct.

Haneke agreed to take over the directorial helm, though the screenplay had been written with Manker's direction in mind, only if Isabelle Huppert was the star. Haneke also reorganised the novel's story, and developed the characters of Anna Schober and her mother to mirror the Kohuts' mother–daughter relationship at a past stage. In pre-production, Haneke followed Jelinek's choices in costumes, including pleated skirts and Burberry trench coats common in Vienna conservatories.

=== Casting ===
Haneke had previously asked Huppert to star in his film Funny Games (1997), which she passed on for another professional conflict. When Haneke told her he would not direct The Piano Teacher without her, Huppert skimmed the screenplay and realized its potential. She said she had studied piano as a child, quitting when she was 15, but began playing again for the film. Eva Green has an uncredited role as one of Walter's friends.

=== Filming ===
Filming began on 21 August 2000 and ended on 28 October 2000.

For the scene in which Erika cuts herself in the bathtub, tubes and a pump were used for the false blood, which the props artist had to conceal from the camera under Huppert. Huppert also wore a blood bag under her clothing for the self-stabbing scene, taken from the novel. Benoît Magimel studied piano during filming to convincingly simulate his playing scenes at the end of production, while the music is playback. Susanne Lothar performed in German, but her lines were dubbed over with French in co-production.

== Reception ==
=== Critical response ===
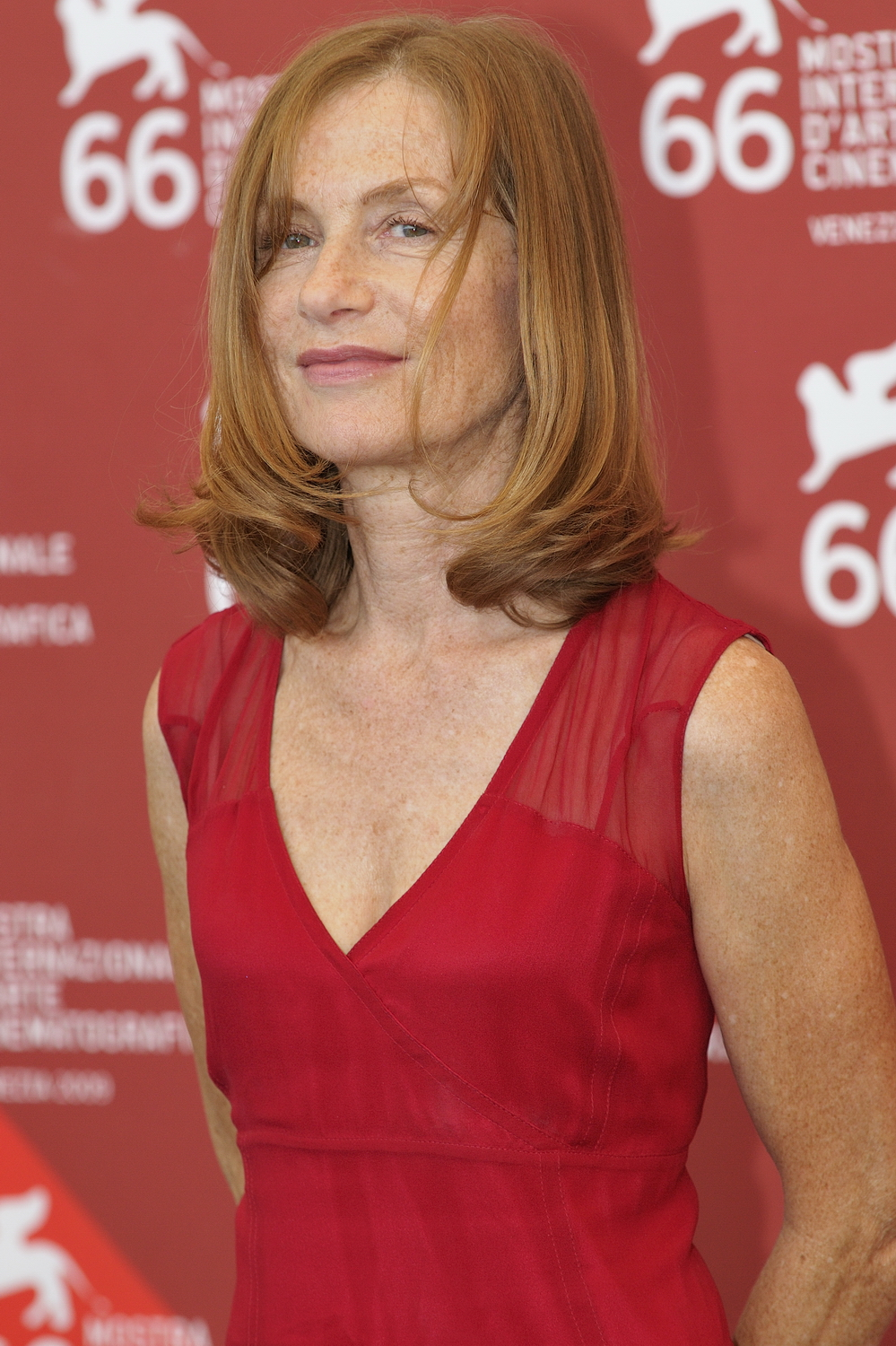
Isabelle Huppert's performance as Erika Kohut received acclaim from critics and audiences.

On the review aggregator website Rotten Tomatoes, 75% of 91 critics' reviews are positive, with an average rating of 7/10. The website's consensus reads: "Though it makes for rather unpleasant viewing, The Piano Teacher is a riveting and powerful psychosexual drama." Metacritic, which uses a weighted average, assigned the film a score of 79 out of 100, based on 26 critics, indicating "generally favorable" reviews.

Roger Ebert of Chicago Sun-Times awarded it three and a half stars, citing Huppert's confidence, writing on hints of revenge against The Mother character and defending the ending, saying "with a film like this any conventional ending would be a cop-out". Peter Bradshaw of The Guardian credited Haneke for aptitude in creating "nerve-jangling disquiet" and Huppert for "the performance of her career". David Denby of The New Yorker praised the film as "audaciously brilliant".

In 2017, Los Angeles Times' critic Justin Chang recalled The Piano Teacher as Huppert's best work in a Haneke film, and "a major achievement in a disturbingly minor key". Mick LaSalle of the San Francisco Chronicle described Huppert as "a rich incarnation of a woman we might see on the street and never guess that she contains fires, earthquakes and infernos", comparing it to her performance in the 2016 film Elle.

In 2025, it was one of the films voted for the "Readers' Choice" edition of The New York Times' list of "The 100 Best Movies of the 21st Century," finishing at number 128.

=== Accolades ===
The Piano Teacher won awards on the European circuit, most notably the Grand Prix at the 2001 Cannes Film Festival, with the two leads, Huppert and Magimel, winning Best Actress and Best Actor. The film was Austria's submission for the Academy Award for Best Foreign Language Film, but it was not nominated.

Award	Date of ceremony	Category	Recipient(s)	Result	Ref.
British Academy Film Awards	24 February 2002	Best Film Not in the English Language	Michael Haneke	Nominated	
Cannes Film Festival	14–25 May 2001	Palme d'Or	Michael Haneke	Nominated	
Cannes Film Festival	14–25 May 2001	Grand Prix	Michael Haneke	Won	
Cannes Film Festival	14–25 May 2001	Best Actor	Benoît Magimel	Won	
Cannes Film Festival	14–25 May 2001	Best Actress	Isabelle Huppert	Won	
César Awards	2 March 2002	Best Actress	Isabelle Huppert	Nominated	
César Awards	2 March 2002	Best Supporting Actress	Annie Girardot	Won	
European Film Awards	1 December 2001	Best Film	Michael Haneke	Nominated	
European Film Awards	1 December 2001	Best Screenwriter	Michael Haneke	Nominated	
European Film Awards	1 December 2001	Best Actress	Isabelle Huppert	Won	
Golden Eagle Award	25 January 2003	Best Foreign Language Film	Michael Haneke	Nominated	
Independent Spirit Awards	22 March 2002	Best Foreign Film	Michael Haneke	Nominated	
Los Angeles Film Critics Association	15 December 2002	Best Actress	Isabelle Huppert	Runner-up	
National Society of Film Critics	4 January 2003	Best Actress	Isabelle Huppert	Runner-up	
San Francisco Film Critics Circle	17 December 2002	Best Actress	Isabelle Huppert	Won	

== See also ==
- Isabelle Huppert on screen and stage
- Sadism and masochism in fiction
- List of submissions to the 74th Academy Awards for Best Foreign Language Film
- List of Austrian submissions for the Academy Award for Best Foreign Language Film
