= Das Schweigen =

Play written by Elfriede Jelinek

Das Schweigen (Silence) is a play by the Nobel Prize winning Austrian playwright Elfriede Jelinek. It premiered in 2000 at the Deutsches Schauspielhaus theatre in Hamburg, Germany. It was published that year in a combined volume with two other Jelinek plays, Das Lebewohl (The Departure) and Der Tod und das Mädchen II (Death and the Maiden II). All three plays referenced German classical music composers. In Das Schweigen, a woman attempts to write about the composer Robert Schumann.
