= Clara S, musikalische Tragödie =

Play written by Elfriede Jelinek

Clara S, musikalische Tragödie is a play by Austrian playwright Elfriede Jelinek. It premiered at the Theater Bonn on 24 September 1982. The play depicts a fictional meeting in 1929 between nineteenth-century German composer Clara Schumann and Gabriele D'Annunzio, a late nineteenth/early twentieth century Italian author.
