= Was geschah, nachdem Nora ihren Mann verlassen hatte; oder Stützen der Gesellschaften =

Was geschah, nachdem Nora ihren Mann verlassen hatte; oder Stützen der Gesellschaften (What Happened after Nora Left Her Husband; or Pillars of Society) is a play by Austrian playwright Elfriede Jelinek. It was first published in 1979 and premiered in October that year, directed by Kurt-Josef Schildknecht, in Graz.

Jelinek's first play follows in the tradition of Henrik Ibsen's A Doll's House and her novel Die Liebhaberinnen. The play follows Ibsen's Nora in order to show how a "small capitalist elite is able to control political and economic institutions." Throughout the play, Nora's role is a "string of male projections on the image of woman: wife, mother, worker, lover, whore, mistress, and business woman." By the play's end, Nora "frees herself" from her upper-class role as a wife and mother to become a factory worker. However, she fails to take part in an "exploitative capitalist society" because of her ambitions.
