= Women as Lovers (novel) =

Novel by Elfriede Jelinek

First edition (publ. Rowohlt Verlag)

Women as Lovers (Die Liebhaberinnen, published 1975) is a novel by Austrian Nobel laureate Elfriede Jelinek that details the lives of the characters Brigitte and Paula, as the two women transition from dreams of the future, to life with a husband and children. In the novel, Brigitte succeeds in "snagging the social and economic commodity Heinz, which directly results in an upgrading of her socioeconomic status." But she pays for it with her body and the loss of her private autonomy. Paula's existence, on the other hand, is "destroyed by her belief in the illusion of love."

Xiu Xiu's 2008 studio album, Women as Lovers is named after the novel.

== Characters ==
- Brigitte
- Heinz
- Paula
- Erich
- Susi
