= Marc Vaux =

British artist (born 1932)

- Born: 29 November 1932 (age 93); Swindon, Wiltshire, England
- Education: Slade School of Fine Art, 1957-1960
- Known for: Painting, Printmaking
- Movement: Abstract Art
- Spouse: Tess Jaray (m. 1960; div. 1982)

Marc Vaux (born 29 November 1932, Swindon) is a British artist who rose to prominence in the 1960s. His work was included in the seminal Situation exhibition of 1960 alongside Robyn Denny, William Turnbull and Bernard Cohen among others. This exhibition was a direct reaction by British abstract artists to the recent exhibitions in London of the American Abstract Expressionists in particular the Tate's 1959 exhibition The New American Painting. Although originally headed for a career in Chemistry, Vaux eventually studied at the Slade School of Fine Art from 1957 to 1960 where he was awarded a Boise traveling scholarship which allowed him to travel in Italy, and later to work at the Jean Ponsa lithographic printing studio in Paris.

In 1986, after a long teaching career he was appointed Head of Painting at the Central/St Martins College of Art and Design in London where he stayed until he retired in 1989 to concentrate full-time on painting.

Vaux's work has variously been described as minimalist and constructivist although since his primary interest is in colour and light he has more in common with the American west coast artists than the New York minimalists.

Marc Vaux said: It [colour] is known to have a direct effect upon the central nervous system/human sensibility, arguably the most effective modifiers of human response, over sound and touch. It is dynamic - dependent on degree of colour, light, surrounding colours. Given the facts it is surprising it has taken so long to come to the position of recognising the effective power of colour alone – the endless potential of colour alone to communicate, affect and modify response.. it can be a pure visual experience equivalent to any other (experience). The nearest equivalent would be the sound of music. I see no reason why colour can't equate with melody and be as memorable. After all Albers wrote poems to equate with his paintings.

A monograph Marc Vaux was written by Vaux's long term supporter Norbert Lynton and published by 21 Publishing in 2005 (ISBN 1872784313).

The Tate Gallery holds a good collection of Vaux's work from 1959 to the present day.

Vaux's first commercial gallery exhibition was at the Grabowski Gallery in London with his then wife Tess Jaray. He was subsequently represented by the Axiom Gallery, Anderson O'Day and then the Redfern Gallery, since 1998 Marc Vaux has been represented by the London art dealer Bernard Jacobson and has had regular exhibitions there.

== Exhibition History ==
| Year | Selected Solo Exhibitions | Gallery/Museum |
|---|---|---|
| 2014 | Marc Vaux: New Ovals, 2 may – 31 May 2014 | Bernard Jacobson Gallery, London |
| 2012 | Full House: Paintings from 1964 | Bernard Jacobson Gallery, London |
| 2011 | Featured Works | Tate Britain |
| 1998, 2002, 2005, 2007, 2010 | Solo Shows | Bernard Jacobson Gallery, London |
| 1994, 1996 | Featured Works | Redfern Gallery, London |
| 1993 | Works on Paper from the Sixties | Redfern Gallery, London |
| 1991 | Featured Works | Anderson O’Day Gallery, London |
| 1990 | Featured Works | Centre for International Contemporary Art, New York |
| 1989 | Featured Works | Park Gallery, College of St Paul and St Mary, Cheltenham |
| 1973 | Featured Works (Two-person show with Tess Jaray) | Whitechapel Art Gallery, London |
| 1969 | Featured Works | Galerie Wilbrand, Cologne, Germany |
| 1970 | Featured Works | Axiom Gallery, London |
| 1967 | Featured Works | Axiom Gallery, London |
| 1965 | Featured Works | Hamilton Galleries, London |
| 1963 | Featured Works (Two-person show with Tess Jaray) | Grabowski Gallery, London |

| Year | Selected Group Exhibitions | Gallery/Museum |
|---|---|---|
| 2017 | Gallery Artists | Bernard Jacobson Gallery, London |
| 2013 | Moving - Norman Foster On Art | Carré d´art - Musée d´art contemporain de Nîmes, Nîmes, France |
| 2012 | Summer Group Show' | Bernard Jacobson Gallery, London |
| 2012 | Coherent Surface, Radiant Light | Bernard Jacobson Gallery, New York |
| 2011 | How to carry the World On One's Back? | Deichtorhallen, Hamburg |
| 2011 | How to carry the World On One's Back? | Deichtorhallen, Hamburg |
| 2011 | Double Exhibition | Broadbent, London |
| 2011 | Gallery Group Show | Bernard Jacobson Gallery, London |
| 2010 | 'Exhibitions Round-up: lifting the heart | Flowers Gallery, London |
| 2009 | The Louvre during the War - Photographs 1938 - 1947' | Musée du Louvre, Paris |
| 2006 | Definite Article | Toomey-Tourell Gallery, San Francisco |
| 2006 | Caro, Denny, Smith and Vaux, The ‘60s | Bernard Jacobson Gallery, London |
| 2005 | 'Paintings 1959 – 2005 | Bernard Jacobson Gallery, London |
| 2005 | Definite Article | Vertigo Gallery, London |
| 2004 | White | 120 Gallery, London |
| 2004 | The Discerning Eye | Mall Galleries, London |
| 2003 | London Group | Gallery 27, London |
| 2003 | Jerwood Prize Exhibition | Jerwood Space, London |
| 2002 | 'Space Vehicles | McClain Gallery, Houston, Texas |
| 1998 | The Discerning Eye | Mall Galleries, London |
| 1997 | Light | Mixed exhibition, Richard Salmon Gallery |
| 1997 | Light | Mixed exhibition, Spacex Gallery, Exeter |
| 1996 | Drawings | Spring Mixed Exhibition, Redfern Gallery |
| 1996 | Cheltenham Open Drawing Exhibition | Cheltenham |
| 1996 | British Abstract Art | Drawings, Flowers East, London |
| 1994 | London Group | Barbican Gallery, London |
| 1994 | British Abstract Art | Flowers East, London |
| 1994 | Tensions | Curwen Gallery, London |
| 1993 | Mixed Show | Redfern Gallery, London |
| 1993 | The Sixties Scene in London | Barbican Gallery, London |
| 1993 | Mixed Spring Show | Redfern Gallery, London |
| 1993 | London Group | Barbican Gallery, London |
| 1992 | Concentrazione | Torino, Italy |
| 1992 | Mixed Summer Show | Redfern Gallery, London |
| 1991 | Small is Beautiful | Abstract, Flowers East, London |
| 1989 | London Group | Gulbenkian Hall, Royal College of Art, London |
| 1989 | The Exhibition of New Art in East London | Whitechapel Art Gallery, London |
| 1988 | London Group | Gulbenkian Hall, Royal College of Art, London |
| 1985 | John Moores Liverpool Exhibition 14 | Walker Art Gallery, Liverpool |
| 1985 | Thirty London Painters | Royal Academy, London |
| 1984 | London Group | Gulbenkian Hall, Royal College of Art, London |
| 1981 | Contemporary Artists in Camden | Camden Arts Centre, London |
| 1979 | The Whitechapel Summer Show ’79 | Whitechapel Art Gallery, London |
| 1976 | Deck of Cards | JPL Fine Art, London |
| 1976 | AIR Exhibition 6 | AIR Gallery, London |
| 1975 | Mai Külföldt Graphika Magyar Gyüjtemenyekben I | Egyetem Galélia, Debrecen, Hungary |
| 1974-5 | 'Artistas Graphicos Britanicos de la Década del 60/Gravures de Artistas Britanicos na Década dos 60 | British Council touring exhibition in South America |
| 1974 | British Painting ‘74 | Hayward Gallery, London |
| 1974 | Künstler Machen Gahnen für Rottweil | Stadtfest Rottwed 74, Federal Republic of Germany |
| 1972 | Grabados Ingleses Contemporaneous 60-70 | Museo Español de Arte Contemporaneous, Madrid (British Council touring exhibition) |
| 1970 | 3rd Salon International de Galeries Pilotes: Artistes et Découvreurs de Notre Temps | Musée d’Art Moderne de la Ville de Paris |
| 1970 | The Captain Cook Bicentenary: Colour and Structure - Recent British and Australian Paintings | Farmers Blaxland Gallery, Sydney, Australia |
| 1970 | Some Recent Art in Britain | Leeds City Art Gallery, Leeds, England |
| 1969 | Konzeptionelle Bilder | Westfälisher Kunsteverein, Münster, Federal Republic of Germany |
| 1969 | Recent British Prints | IBM Gallery, New York |
| 1969 | Fine Art for Industry | RCA Gallery, London |
| 1969 | Contemporary British Graphics | British Council touring exhibition in the US |
| 1968 | 100th Exhibition | Grabowski Gallery, London |
| 1968 | British Painting: Collection of Leicestershire Education Authority | Whitechapel Art Gallery, London |
| 1968 | Grabados de Artistas Britanicos Nuevas Tendencias 1968 | Galeria de Exposiciones Temporales, Museo de Arte Moderno, Mexico City |
| 1968 | Twenty-five Camden Artists | Central Library, Swiss Cottage, London |
| 1967 | The Ninth International Art Exhibition of Japan | the Mainighi Newspaper and the Japan International Art Promotion Association, Tokyo |
| 1967 | Brittiska Gouacher och Färggragik | Sundsvalls Konstförening Sundsvall, Sweden VI John Moores Liverpool Exhibition, Walker Art Gallery, Liverpool |
| 1967 | Transatlantic Graphics | Camden Arts Centre, London |
| 1967 | Six Artists: Denny, Hoyland, Vaux, Lancaster, Boshier, Evans | Victoria and Albert Museum, London |
| 1967 | Society of Scottish Artists 73rd Exhibition of Painting Sculpture, Drawings, Applied Art and Architecture | Royal Scottish Academy Galleries, Edinburgh, Scotland |
| 1967 | Junge Engländer | Galerie Heide Hildebrand, Klangenfurt, Austria |
| 1967 | Graphick Junger Engländer | Glaerie Alice Pauli, Lausanne, Switzerland |
| 1967 | Spring Exhibition 1967 | Bradford City Art Gallery, Bradford |
| 1966 | London Under Forty | Galleria Milano, Milan, Italy |
| 1966 | Vormen van de Kleur | Stedelijk Museum, Amsterdam; Württembergischer Kunstvetein, Stuttgart, Federal Republic of Germany; and Kunsthalle, Bern, Switzerland |
| 1966 | Form and Image | Leeds Institute Gallery, Leeds, England |
| 1966 | Spring Exhibition 1966 | Bradford City Art Gallery, Bradford |
| 1966 | Hamilton Artists | Hamilton Galleries, London |
| 1965-68 | Recent Prints by Some British Painters and Sculptors | British Council touring exhibition in India |
| 1965 | John Moores Liverpool Exhibition | Walker Art Gallery, Liverpool |
| 1965 | Syn | Galerie Vaier, Mainz and Galerie Margarete Lauter, Mannheim, Federal Republic of Germany |
| 1965 | Premio Internazionale Biella Per l’Incisione | Circolo degli Artisti di Biella, Biella, Italy |
| 1965 | Spring Exhibition 1965 | Bradford City Art Gallery, Bradford |
| 1965 | Second Commonwealth Biennial of Abstract Art | Commonwealth Institute, London |
| 1964 | About Round: London Galleries | Leeds University, Leeds, England |
| 1964 | Spring Exhibition 1964 | Bradford City Art Gallery, Bradford |
| 1963 | V Mednarodna Graficna Rozstava/V Exposition Internationale de Gravure | Moderna Galerija, Ljubljana, Yugoslavia |
| 1962-3 | Situation: An Exhibition of Recent British Abstract Art | British Arts Council touring exhibition in England |
| 1962 | 9 Painters from England | Galleria Trastevere, Rome |
| 1961 | Neu Malerei in England | Städtisches Museum, Leverkusen, Germany |
| 1961 | 2nd Biennale de Paris | Musee d’Art Moderne, Paris |
| 1961 | New London Situation: And Exhibition of British Abstract Art | New London Gallery, London |
| 1960 | London Group | R.B.A. Galleries, London |
| 1960 | Situation: British Abstract Art | R.B.A. Galleries, London |
| 1959-60 | Young Contemporaries | R.B.A. Galleries, London |
