= Greed (Jelinek novel) =

Novel by Elfriede Jelinek

- Author: Elfriede Jelinek
- Original title: Gier
- Translator: Martin Chalmers
- Language: German
- Publisher: Rowohlt Verlag, Seven Stories Press
- Publication date: 2000
- Publication place: Germany
- English publication date: 2006
- Pages: 461
- ISBN: 3-498-03334-4

Greed (German: Gier) is a 2000 novel by the Austrian writer Elfriede Jelinek. It was the first novel of hers to be translated into English after winning the Nobel Prize for Literature, and also the first book of hers to be translated into English in seven years. The English translation was published in the UK by Serpent's Tail in 2006 and in the US by Seven Stories Press in 2007. While much of her work is rooted in the Austrian literary tradition, she has also been known to take a feminist stand on the dealings of the Communist Party of Austria.

== Plot ==
The novel tells the story of a policeman who kills a 15-year-old girl while she is performing fellatio and then dumps the body in a lake.

== Reception ==
Philip Hensher of The Daily Telegraph wrote: "About 100 pages into this atrocious novel, I suddenly couldn't bear it one second longer. I thought: before I go any further, I want to read something amusing, lucid, interesting and straightforward." Hensher continued: "A story of some sort emerges, but the thrust of the novel is really the most vulgar and stupid commentary imaginable about the murderous misogyny of men, the environment, the appalling taste of the kleinburgerlicher and so on. ... Densely unreadable as it is, there is something terribly banal about every one of its intellectual propositions; as hopelessly banal in its attempted chic as its predominant present tense." Lucy Ellmann reviewed the book for The Guardian, and wrote that it provides just what the literary landscape needs: "Philip Roth says the novel is dead, but it would be more accurate to say the audience is dead – we're all just too polite to mention it. What is killing the novel is people's growing dependence on feel-good fiction, fantasy and non-fiction. ... Real writing is not about rules. It's about electrifying prose, it's about play." Ellmann wrote: "Jelinek gives us a startling glimpse here of what women are, as well as answering Freud's question, 'What do women want?' It's neither gentle nor sweet nor safe nor reasonable – just true."

Joel Agee wrote in The New York Times: "Jelinek has described herself as a kind of scientist who dispassionately 'looks into the petri dish of society.' But her procedure in Greed is more like that of a prosecuting attorney in a trial of the indefensible, with effigies standing in for the accused, no judge or jury, no court protocol and of course no counsel for the defense. ... No one else, except perhaps a conscientious reviewer, would sit out her entire presentation."

Nicholas Spice of the London Review of Books saw parallels between the main character and Robert Musil's The Man Without Qualities and Georg Büchner's Woyzeck. Spice wrote: "In Greed, Jelinek finds a way to deal with depth (with the abyss inside the human) without either reverting to the analgesic of realism or exhausting the reader with flood-lit ugliness. For all its derangement, Greed is not ugly. Indeed, once one has got used to it, it yields strange and memorable pleasures." However, Spice added: "With its constant shifts of tone and register, the slippery sideways movement of thought through wordplay and punning, the frequent allusions to other German texts, the idiom of Greed poses almost insuperable obstacles to good translation. ... As it is, doubtless under tight economic constraints, the publishers have paid for a hit-and-miss, standard, 'by the page' translation and the result is a disaster. It's hard to imagine that Jelinek's reputation in the English-speaking world will ever recover."

== See also ==
- 2000 in literature
- Austrian literature
