= The Emigrants (Sebald novel) =

Book by W. G. Sebald

- First edition (German)
- Author: W. G. Sebald
- Original title: Die Ausgewanderten
- Language: German
- Genre: Semi-autobiographical narratives
- Publisher: Vito von Eichborn
- Publication date: 1992
- Publication place: Germany
- English publication date: 1996
- Media type: Print
- Pages: 354
- ISBN: 3-8218-4293-8

The Emigrants (German: Die Ausgewanderten) is a 1992 collection of narratives by the German writer W. G. Sebald. It won the Berlin Literature Prize, the Literatur Nord Prize, and the Johannes Bobrowski Medal. The English translation by Michael Hulse was first published in 1996.

== Summary ==
In The Emigrants, Sebald's narrator recounts his involvement with and the life stories of four different characters, all of whom are emigrants (to England and the United States). As with most of Sebald's work, the text strays sharply from general formats of plot and narrative. It also includes many black and white, unlabeled photographs. James Wood, in an introduction for Sebald's final novel, Austerlitz, claims that roughly 30 percent of the photographs in The Emigrants bear "an entirely fictitious relationship with their supposed subjects." For example, Ambros Adelwarth's farewell note and its accompanying photograph were creations of Sebald himself.

Dr. Henry Selwyn is the estranged husband of Sebald's landlady. Selwyn fought in the First World War and has an interest in gardening and tending to animals. He confides in Sebald about his Lithuanian Jewish family's immigration to England from Lithuania, and suspects that it is this secretive, alien past that contributed to the dissolution of his relationship with his wife. He commits suicide by inserting a gun in his mouth. Selwyn, and the other members of his household, were loosely based upon the family and staff who resided in the house in Wymondham (Norfolk, UK) in which Sebald rented a room when he first took up his post as a lecturer in European literature at the University of East Anglia, in 1970.

Paul Bereyter was the narrator's childhood teacher in a town referenced in the text only as "S". A quarter Jewish, he found employment difficult in the period leading up to the Second World War, although he eventually served in the Wehrmacht. Teaching in the small school after the war, Bereyter found a passion for his students while living a lonely, quiet life. In later years, his eyesight began to fail and he moved to France, where he met and spent much time with Mme Landau, from whom the narrator obtains most of his information about Bereyter. Like Selwyn, Bereyter commits suicide, by lying down on railway tracks.

The narrator's great uncle, Ambros Adelwarth, was the travelling companion of Cosmo Solomon, an affluent American aviator, gifted with much luck at gambling and a wayward attitude towards life. In his youth, he accompanied this man across Europe, and into Turkey and Asia Minor, before Cosmo fell ill and was sent to a mental institution. It is implied that there may have been some homosexual feelings between the two men. After Cosmo's death, Adelwarth was the butler of the young man's family, living on Long Island until first Cosmo's father, then the latter's second wife, died. In his later years, Ambros falls victim to an extreme depression which causes him to commit himself to the same institution that once held Cosmo. He allows and, in his own way, even encourages increasingly frequent and brutal electro-convulsive therapy to be performed on him by the institution's fanatical director.

As a young man in Manchester the narrator befriends an expatriate German-Jewish painter, Max Ferber. Years later the artist gives the narrator his mother's history of her idyllic life as a girl in a Bavarian village. It was written as she and her husband awaited deportation to the East and death. This section is written as a gradual discovery on the narrator's part of the effects of the Holocaust on Ferber and his family.

== Themes ==
The Emigrants is largely concerned with memory, trauma, and feelings of foreignness. For example, Dr. Selwyn dwells on the story of a man he met in Switzerland in the time immediately prior to World War I, and explains how he felt a deeper companionship with this man than he felt for his wife. He also divulges how his family emigrated from Lithuania as a young boy, and tries to get the narrator to reveal how he feels being an emigrant from Germany living in England. In acknowledgement of this motif, Lisa Cohen of the Boston Review points out that The Emigrants' section-title characters "suffer[ ] from memory and from the compulsion to obliterate it; from a mourning and melancholia so deep that it is almost unnamable; from the knowledge that he has survived while those he loved have not; from problems distinguishing dream and reality; from a profound sense of displacement."

A concomitant theme is the impact of World War II and the Holocaust on German nationals, particularly on those of Jewish heritage. All the characters in the work are emigrants who have left Germany or a Germanised community, each specific case has its nuances. For example, Paul Bereyter remains in his homeland but becomes an outsider because of the persecution he experiences as a Jew; Ambros Adelwarth is a non-Jewish character, but has close affiliations with a family of German-Jewish emigrants as the family's major-domo, and the affiliation makes him feel the angst of the war more sharply from abroad. Generally speaking, the narratives explore the different senses in which the characters' homeland can remain with them—in the form of both memories and memorabilia—as they approach the end of their lives.

== Publication history ==
The English translation by Michael Hulse was first published clothbound by the Harvill Press in 1996, then issued as New Directions Paperbook 853 in 1997, in a cover designed by Semadar Megged. It was reissued as NDP 1358 in 2016, with a cover designed by Peter Mendelsund.

The character Max Aurach's last name, which is close to the name of his real-world inspiration, Frank Auerbach, was changed to Ferber in English translations.

== Reception ==
Upon publication, the English version of The Emigrants was well received by critics, and has since gained increasing recognition. Cynthia Ozick strongly praised both Sebald and Hulse, speculating that "we are indebted...to Sebald's translator (himself a poet), for allowing us to see, through the stained glass of his consummate Englishing, what must surely be the most delicately powerful German prose since Thomas Mann." Lisa Cohen offered similarly strong praise, hailing The Emigrants' “uncanny vividness and specificity,” concluding that “the brilliance of this book lies in the fact that Sebald never loses sight of either the power of metaphor or the viciousness of history.” Daniel Medin noted in 2003 that "Hulse's 1996 translation of Die Ausgewanderten introduced Sebald to audiences beyond...German [readership], and [Sebald] was hailed immediately as a new and compelling voice in contemporary European fiction." Kirkus Reviews wrote: "The pervasive melancholy in these lives that are locked in tragedy is formidable, but at the same time the lyricism and immediacy of the narratives are marvelous to behold: a profound and moving work that should leave no reader unaffected."
