= Ein Sportstück =

Play by Elfriede Jelinek

Ein Sportstück is a play by Austrian playwright Elfriede Jelinek. It was first published in 1998. The premiere took place on 23 January 1998 at the Burgtheater in Vienna under the auspices of the German director Einar Schleef. The English language premiere, under the title Sports Play, translated by Penny Black with Karen Jürs-Munby, took place on 11 July 2012 at Live at LICA (Nuffield Theatre) in Lancaster and toured the UK to coincide with London 2012 Olympics. It was directed by Vanda Butkovic and brought to the UK an essential figure of contemporary cultural canon.

The play examines society's obsession with the publicly waged battle of sports.

== Bibliography ==
- Elfriede Jelinek: Ein Sportstück. Rowohlt, Reinbek 2004, ISBN 3-499-22593-X.
