= W. G. Sebald =

German writer and academic (1944–2001)

- Born: Winfried Georg Sebald; 18 May 1944; Wertach, Bavaria, Nazi Germany
- Died: 14 December 2001 (aged 57); Norfolk, England
- Education: University of Freiburg; University of Fribourg; University of East Anglia (PhD); University of Hamburg
- Occupations: Writer, academic
- Writing career
- Language: German
- Notable works: Vertigo; The Emigrants; The Rings of Saturn; Austerlitz

Winfried Georg Sebald (18 May 1944 – 14 December 2001), known as W. G. Sebald or (as he preferred) Max Sebald, was a German writer and academic. At the time of his death at the age of 57, he was according to The New Yorker "widely recognized for his extraordinary contribution to world literature."

== Life ==
Sebald was born in Wertach, Bavaria on 18 May 1944. He was the second of the three children of Rosa and Georg Sebald, and their only son. Though he was born in Wertach, he lived and spent much of his youth, roughly between the ages of four and nineteen, in the nearby town of Sonthofen. His father had joined the Reichswehr in 1929 during the Weimar era and served in the Wehrmacht under the Nazis, participating in the Invasion of Poland in 1939. His father remained a detached figure, as he was held as a prisoner of war until 1947. Sebald's maternal grandfather, the small-town police officer Josef Egelhofer (1872–1956), was the most important male presence during the boy's early years.

While at school in Oberstdorf, Sebald was shown images of the Holocaust and recalled that no one knew how to explain what they had just seen. He later explored the Holocaust and European modernity, especially its modes of warfare and persecution, as central themes in his fiction.

Sebald studied German and English literature first at the University of Freiburg and then at the University of Fribourg in Switzerland, where he received a degree in 1965. He was a lecturer at the University of Manchester from 1966 to 1969. He returned to St. Gallen in Switzerland for a year, hoping to work as a teacher, but could not settle. Sebald married his Austrian-born wife, Ute, in 1967.

In 1970 he became a lecturer at the University of East Anglia (UEA). There, he completed his PhD in 1973 with a dissertation entitled The Revival of Myth: A Study of Alfred Döblin's Novels. Sebald acquired habilitation from the University of Hamburg in 1986.

In 1987, he was appointed to a chair of European literature at UEA. In 1989 he became the founding director of the British Centre for Literary Translation. He lived at Wymondham and Poringland in Norfolk County while serving at UEA.

== Final year ==
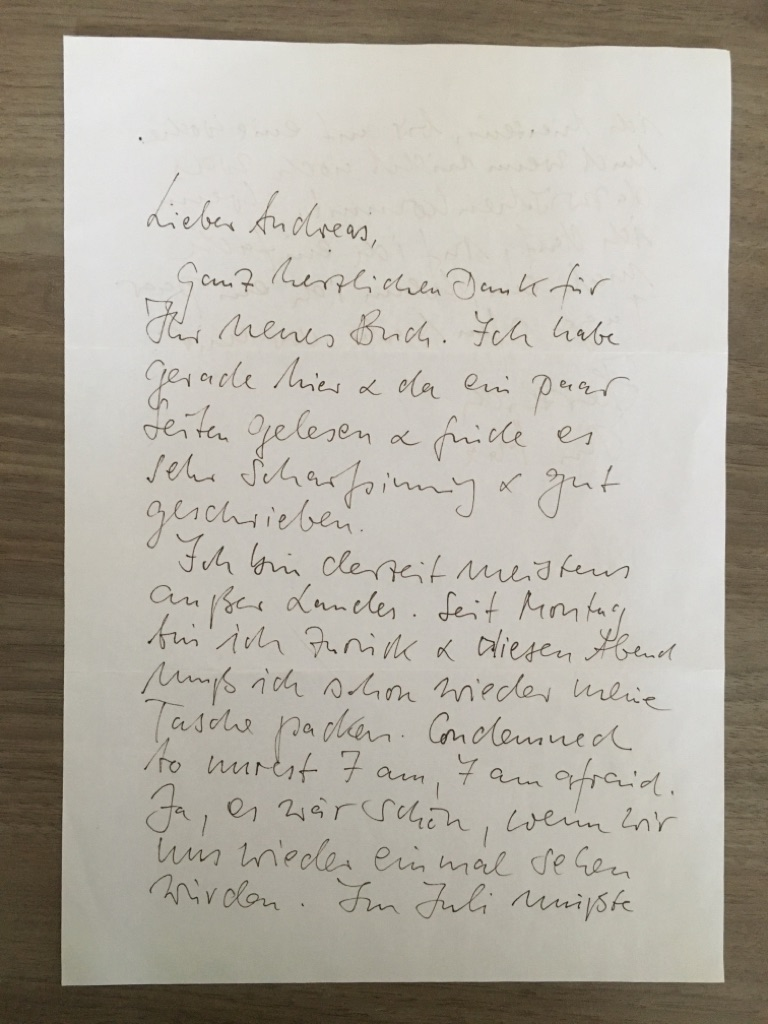
W.G. Sebald to Andreas Dorschel, June 2001, page 1

The 2001 publication of Austerlitz (both in German and English) would bring Sebald worldwide recognition: "Austerlitz was received enthusiastically on an international scale; literary critics celebrated it frenetically; the book established Sebald as a modern classic." He was tipped as a possible future winner of the Nobel Prize in Literature. By then he was in high demand by literary institutions and radio programmes throughout Western Europe. Newspapers, magazines and journals from Germany, Austria, Belgium, the Netherlands, Britain and the U.S. urged him for interviews. "Condemned to unrest I am, I am afraid", he wrote to Andreas Dorschel in June 2001, returning from one trip and setting out for the next.

For a considerable time, Sebald had been aware of a congenital cardiac insufficiency. To a visitor from the US, he described himself in August 2001 as "someone who knows he has to leave before too long".

Sebald died while driving near Norwich in December 2001. The event threw the literary public into a state of shock. Sebald had been driving with his daughter Anna, who survived the crash. The coroner's report, released some six months after the accident, stated that Sebald had suffered a heart attack and had died of this condition before his car swerved across the road and collided with an oncoming lorry.

W.G. Sebald is buried in St. Andrew's churchyard in Framingham Earl, close to where he lived.

== Themes and style ==
Sebald's works are largely concerned with the themes of memory and loss of memory (both personal and collective) and decay (of civilizations, traditions or physical objects). They are, in particular, attempts to reconcile himself with, and deal in literary terms with, the trauma of the Second World War and its effect on the German people. On the Natural History of Destruction (1999) is an essay he wrote on the wartime bombing of German cities and the absence in German writing of any real response since then. His concern with The Holocaust is expressed in several books delicately tracing his own biographical connections with Jews.

Contrary to Germany's political and intellectual establishment, Sebald denied the singularity of the Holocaust: "I see the catastrophe caused by the Germans, dreadful as it was, by no means as a singular event – it developed with a certain logic from European history and then, for the same reason, ate itself into European history." Consequently, Sebald, in his literary works, always tried to situate and contextualize the Holocaust within modern European history, even avoiding a focus on Germany.

Sebald completely rejected the mainstream of Western German literature of the 1950s to 1970s, as represented by Heinrich Böll and Günter Grass. "I hate [...] the German postwar novel like pestilence," he said, and instead took a deliberate counter-stance. Sebald's distinctive and innovative novels (which he mostly called simply: prose ("Prosa")) were written in an intentionally somewhat old-fashioned and elaborate form of German (one passage in Austerlitz famously contains a sentence that is 9 pages long). Sebald closely supervised the English translations of his works (principally by Anthea Bell and Michael Hulse). These include Vertigo, The Emigrants, The Rings of Saturn and Austerlitz. They are notable for their curious and wide-ranging mixture of fact (or apparent fact), recollection and fiction, often punctuated by indistinct black-and-white photographs set in evocative counterpoint to the narrative rather than illustrating it directly. His novels are presented as observations and recollections made while travelling around Europe. They also have a dry and mischievous sense of humour.

Sebald was also the author of three books of poetry: For Years Now with Tess Jaray (2001), After Nature (1988), and Unrecounted (2004).

== Works ==
=== Novels ===
- (1990) Vertigo. London: Harvill. (Schwindel. Gefühle) English ed. 1999
- (1992) The Emigrants. London: Harvill. (Die Ausgewanderten. Vier lange Erzählungen) English ed. 1996
- (1995) The Rings of Saturn. London: Harvill. (Die Ringe des Saturn. Eine englische Wallfahrt) English ed. 1998
- (2001) Austerlitz. London: Hamish Hamilton. English translation by Anthea Bell won the 2002 Independent Foreign Fiction Prize.

=== Poetry ===
- (1988) After Nature. London: Hamish Hamilton. (Nach der Natur. Ein Elementargedicht) English ed. 2002
- (2001) For Years Now. London: Short Books.
- (2003) Unrecounted. London: Hamish Hamilton. (Unerzählt, 33 Texte) English ed. 2004
- (2008) Across the Land and the Water: Selected Poems, 1964–2001. London: Hamish Hamilton. (Über das Land und das Wasser: Ausgewählte Gedichte 1964–2001) English ed. 2011

=== Non-fiction ===
- (1998) A Place in the Country. London: Hamish Hamilton. (Logis in einem Landhaus) English ed. 2013
- (1999) On the Natural History of Destruction. London: Hamish Hamilton. (Luftkrieg und Literatur: Mit einem Essay zu Alfred Andersch) English ed. 2003
- (2003) Campo Santo. London: Hamish Hamilton. (Campo Santo, Prosa, Essays) English ed. 2005
- (2025) Silent Catastrophes: Essays. London: Hamish Hamilton. (Die Beschreibung des Unglücks. 1985. Unheimliche Heimat. 1991.)

== Influences ==
The works of Jorge Luis Borges, especially "The Garden of Forking Paths" and "Tlön, Uqbar, Orbis Tertius", were a major influence on Sebald. (Tlön and Uqbar appear in The Rings of Saturn.) In a conversation during his final year, Sebald named Gottfried Keller, Adalbert Stifter, Heinrich von Kleist and Jean Paul as his literary models. He also credited the Austrian novelist Thomas Bernhard as a major influence on his work, and paid homage within his work to Kafka and Nabokov (the figure of Nabokov appears in every one of the four sections of The Emigrants).

== Memorials ==
=== Sebaldweg ("Sebald Way") ===
As a memorial to the writer, in 2005 the town of Wertach created an eleven kilometre long walkway called the "Sebaldweg". It runs from the border post at Oberjoch (1,159m) to W. G. Sebald's birthplace on Grüntenseestrasse 3 in Wertach (915m). The route is that taken by the narrator in Il ritorno in patria, the final section of Vertigo ("Schwindel. Gefühle") by W. G. Sebald. Six steles have been erected along the way with texts from the book relating to the respective topographical place, and also with reference to fire and to people who died in the Second World War, two of Sebald's main themes.

=== Sebald Copse ===
In the grounds of the University of East Anglia in Norwich a round wooden bench encircles a copper beech tree, planted in 2003 by the family of W. G. Sebald in memory of the writer. Together with other trees donated by former students of the writer, the area is called the "Sebald Copse". The bench, whose form echoes The Rings of Saturn, carries an inscription from the penultimate poem of Unerzählt ("Unrecounted"): "Unerzählt bleibt die Geschichte der abgewandten Gesichter" ("Unrecounted always it will remain the story of the averted faces").

=== Patience (After Sebald) ===
In 2011, Grant Gee made the documentary Patience (After Sebald) about the author's trek through the East Anglian landscape.
