= A Place in the Country (essay collection) =

- First edition (German)
- Author: W. G. Sebald
- Original title: Logis in einem Landhaus
- Translator: Jo Catling
- Language: German
- Publisher: Hanser
- Publication date: 1998
- Publication place: Germany
- English publication date: 2013
- Media type: Print
- Pages: 209
- ISBN: 9780241144183

A Place in the Country consists of six essays or monographs by W.G. Sebald, each devoted to a specific writer or artist.

== Contents ==
- A Comet in the Heavens: On Johann Peter Hebel
- J'Aurais Voulu Que Ce Lac Eut Été L'océan: On Jean Jacques-Rousseau
- Why I Grieve I Do Not Know: On Eduard Morike
- Death Draws Nigh, Time Marches On: On Gottfried Keller
- Le Promeneur Solitaire: On Robert Walser
- As Day and Night: On Jan Peter Tripp
