= St Clement's Hospital =

- Tower Hamlets District Health Authority
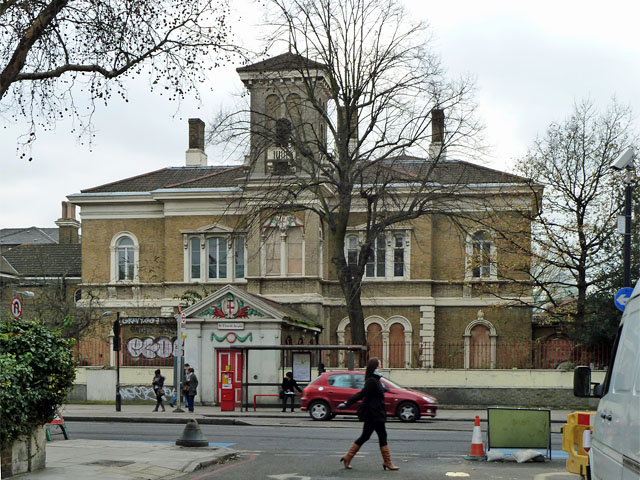
- St Clement's Hospital

- Shown in Tower Hamlets

Geography
- Location: London
- Coordinates: 51°31′33″N 0°01′46″W

Organisation
- Care system: NHS England

Services
- Emergency department: No

History
- Founded: 1874
- Closed: 2005

St Clement's Hospital was a mental health hospital located in the Bow and was situated in the London Borough of Tower Hamlets,

== History ==
The building opened in a former workhouse building as the City of London Union Infirmary in 1874. The palatial design of the workhouse had been created by architect Richard Tress and had cost over £55,000 to construct, boasted central heating, a dining-hall measuring 100 feet by 50 feet, Siberian marble pillars, and a chapel with stained glass windows and a new organ. It closed in 1909 but re-opened as a hospital for chronically ill people becoming known as the City of London Institution in 1912 and as the Bow Institution in 1913.

At the time of transfer to the London County Council in 1930 the hospital had 744 beds. The Master was H. C. Stuttle, the medical officer E. T. Pinhay, and Mrs E. Edwins was Matron.

It became a psychiatric unit, known by its most commonly adopted name of 'St Clement's Hospital' in 1936. The west side of the site suffered extensive bomb damage during the Second World War, destroying the chapel and the sites initial symmetry. The hospital joined the newly formed National Health Service in 1948 and then came under the same management as the London Hospital in 1968. After services were transferred to a new Adult Mental Health Facility at Mile End Hospital, the hospital closed in February 2006.

=== London's First Community Land Trust ===
Following the hospital's closure the site was transferred from the NHS to English Partnerships, then to the Homes and Communities Agency, and eventually the Greater London Authority, who marketed it as a regeneration opportunity in 2011. Following a long campaign, the Greater London Authority announced in April 2012 that the site would include London's first Community Land Trust. Mayor of London Boris Johnson broke the ground on the site in March 2014. The house prices are not based on the open market rate but instead are linked to the average median salaries in the London Borough of Tower Hamlets. This formula is reapplied every time a house within the Trust is sold, creating what organisers describe as "truly and permanently affordable housing".

== See also ==
- Healthcare in London
- List of hospitals in England
- Community Land Trust
- London CLT
