= Bambiland =

Bambiland is a play by Austrian playwright Elfriede Jelinek, winner of the 2004 Nobel Prize in Literature. The play caused a sensation because of its protest against the Guantanamo Bay prison. In typical Jelinek style, there are many acts of violence, both physical and sexual. Both the text of the play and its English translation by Lilian Friedberg are available on Jelinek's website. A print version of Friedberg's translation appeared in Yale University's Theater journal in 2009.

A trailer of a 2017 production by Peter Lorenz at the James Arnott Theatre in Glasgow can be found at BAMBILAND.
