= Elfriede Jelinek =

Austrian playwright and novelist

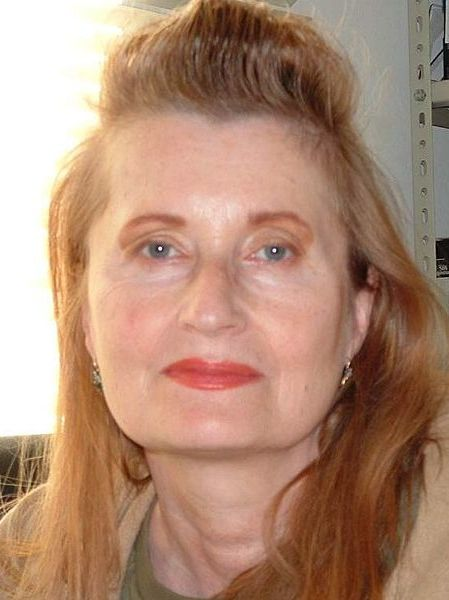
- Jelinek in 2004
- Born: 20 October 1946 (age 80); Mürzzuschlag, Austria
- Education: University of Vienna
- Occupations: Playwright, novelist
- Spouse: Gottfried Hüngsberg (m. 1974; died 2022)
- Writing career
- Years active: 1963–present
- Genres: Feminism, social criticism, postdramatic theatre, postmodernism, experimental literature
- Notable works: The Piano Teacher, The Children of the Dead, Greed, Lust
- Notable awards: Georg Büchner Prize; 1998; Nobel Prize in Literature; 2004

Elfriede Jelinek (German: [ɛlˈfʁiːdə ˈjɛlinɛk]; born 20 October 1946) is an Austrian playwright and novelist. She is one of the most decorated authors to write in German and was awarded the 2004 Nobel Prize in Literature for her "musical flow of voices and counter-voices in novels and plays that, with extraordinary linguistic zeal, reveal the absurdity of society's clichés and their subjugating power". She is considered to be among the most important living playwrights of the German language.

== Biography ==
Elfriede Jelinek was born on 20 October 1946 in Mürzzuschlag, Styria, Austria, the daughter of Olga Ilona (née Buchner), a personnel director, and Friedrich Jelinek. She was raised in Vienna by her Romanian-German Catholic mother and a non-observant Czech Jewish father (whose surname Jelínek means "little deer" in Czech). Her mother's family was of an upper middle-class background, while her father was a working-class socialist.

Her father was a chemist, who managed to avoid persecution during the Second World War by working in strategically important industrial production. However, many of his relatives were murdered during the Holocaust. Her mother, with whom she had a strained relationship, was from a formerly prosperous Vienna family. At the age of six, Jelinek was a patient of Hans Asperger, which she later described as "a crime [...] Instead of sending me out to play in the company of kids my age, my mother sent me into the company of severe neurotics and psychopaths." In 1995, she stated that she was "[n]ot an Asperger autistic, though indeed not far off." As a child, she attended a Roman Catholic convent school in Vienna. Her mother planned a career for her as a musical "Wunderkind". She was instructed in piano, organ, guitar, violin, viola, and recorder from an early age. Later, she went on to study at the Vienna Conservatory, where she graduated with an organist diploma; during this time, she tried to meet her mother's high expectations, while coping with her psychologically ill father. She studied art history and theater at the University of Vienna. However, she had to discontinue her studies due to an anxiety disorder, which resulted in self-isolation at her parents' house for a year. During this time, she began serious literary work as a form of therapy. After a year, she began to feel comfortable leaving the house, often with her mother. She began writing poetry at a young age. She made her literary debut with Lisas Schatten (Lisa's Shadow) in 1967, and received her first literary prize in 1969. During the 1960s, she became active politically, read a great deal, and "spent an enormous amount of time watching television".

She married Gottfried Hüngsberg on 12 June 1974.

I was 27; he was 29. I knew enough men. Sexuality was, strangely, the only area where I emancipated myself early on. Our marriage takes place in two cities. It's a kind of Tale of Two Cities in the Dickensian sense. I've always commuted between Vienna and Munich. Vienna is where I've always lived because my friends are here and because I've never wanted to leave Vienna. In the end I've been caught up here. Munich is my husband's city and so I've always traveled to and from, and that's been good for our marriage.

== Work and political engagement ==
Despite the author's own differentiation from Austria (due to her criticism of Austria's Nazi past), Jelinek's writing is deeply rooted in the tradition of Austrian literature, showing the influence of Austrian writers such as Ingeborg Bachmann, Marlen Haushofer, and Robert Musil.

Editor Friederike Eigler states that Jelinek has three major and inter-related "targets" in her writing: what she views as capitalist consumer society and its commodification of all human beings and relationships, what she views as the remnants of Austria's fascist past in public and private life, and what she views as the systematic exploitation and oppression of women in a capitalist-patriarchal society. Jelinek has claimed in multiple interviews that the Austrian-Jewish satirical tradition has been a formative influence on her writing, citing Karl Kraus, Elias Canetti, and Jewish cabaret in particular. In an interview with Sigrid Löffler, Jelinek claimed that her work is considered an oddity in contemporary Austria, where she claims satire is unappreciated and misunderstood, "because the Jews are dead." She has stressed her Jewish identity as the daughter of a Holocaust survivor, claiming a continuity with a Jewish-Viennese tradition that she believes has been destroyed by fascism and is dying out. In 2024, Jelinek signed an open letter denouncing the Palestinian Campaign for the Academic and Cultural Boycott of Israel.

=== Work ===
Jelinek's output has included radio plays, poetry, theatre texts, polemical essays, anthologies, novels, translations, screenplays, musical compositions, libretti and ballets, film and video art. Jelinek's work is multi-faceted, and highly controversial. It has been praised and condemned by leading literary critics. In the wake of the Fritzl case, for example, she was accused of "executing 'hysterical' portraits of Austrian perversity". Likewise, her political activism has encountered divergent and often heated reactions. Despite the controversy surrounding her work, Jelinek has won many distinguished awards; among them are the Georg Büchner Prize in 1998; the Mülheim Dramatists Prize in 2002 and 2004; the Franz Kafka Prize in 2004; and the Nobel Prize in Literature, also in 2004.

Female sexuality, sexual abuse, and the battle of the sexes in general are prominent topics in her work. Texts such as Wir sind Lockvögel, Baby! (We are Decoys, Baby!), Die Liebhaberinnen (Women as Lovers) and Die Klavierspielerin (The Piano Teacher) showcase the brutality and power play inherent in human relations in a style that is, at times, ironically formal and tightly controlled. According to Jelinek, power and aggression are often the principal driving forces of relationships. Likewise Ein Sportstück (Sports Play) explores the darker side of competitive sports. Her provocative novel Lust contains graphic description of sexuality, aggression and abuse. It received poor reviews by many critics, some of whom likened it to pornography. But others, who noted the power of the cold descriptions of moral failures, considered it to have been misunderstood and undervalued by them.

On 11 October 2005, just a few days before the announcement of the 2005 Nobel laureate for literature, Knut Ahnlund, a member of the Swedish Academy, which chooses the laureates for the Nobel Prize in Literature, declared that he would leave the Academy in protest over the prize the previous year being given to Jelinek, whose work Ahnlund characterized as chaotic and pornographic.

In April 2006, Jelinek spoke out to support Peter Handke, whose play Die Kunst des Fragens (The Art of Asking) was removed from the repertoire of the Comédie-Française for his alleged support of Slobodan Milošević. Her work is less known in English-speaking countries. However, in July and August 2012, a major English language premiere of her play Ein Sportstück by Just a Must theatre company brought her dramatic work to the attention of English-speaking audiences. The following year, in February and March 2013, the Women's Project in New York staged the North American premiere of Jackie, one of her Princess Dramas.

=== Political engagement ===
Jelinek was a member of Austria's Communist Party from 1974 to 1991. She became a household name during the 1990s due to her vociferous clash with Jörg Haider's Freedom Party. Following the 1999 National Council elections, and the subsequent formation of a coalition cabinet consisting of the Freedom Party and the Austrian People's Party, Jelinek became one of the new cabinet's more vocal critics.

Many foreign governments moved swiftly to ostracize Austria's administration, citing the Freedom Party's alleged nationalism and authoritarianism. The cabinet construed the sanctions against it as directed against Austria as such, and attempted to prod the nation into a national rallying (Nationaler Schulterschluss) behind the coalition parties.

This provoked a temporary heating of the political climate severe enough for dissidents such as Jelinek to be accused of treason by coalition supporters.

On 28 August 2026, Jelinek wrote on her website condemning Israel's continuing "land grabbing" of the West Bank, Gaza Strip and Jerusalem and called the two-state solution as a "lie". On her website, Jelinek also stated that she feared "ethnic cleansing" in the region because "where the land is lacking, people themselves become meaningless".

== Awards and honors ==
- 1996: Literaturpreis der Stadt Bremen for Die Kinder der Toten
- 1998: Georg Büchner Prize
- 2002: Mülheimer Dramatikerpreis for Macht Nichts
- 2003: Else Lasker-Schüler Dramatist Prize
- 2004: Hörspielpreis der Kriegsblinden for Jackie
- 2004: Franz Kafka Prize
- 2004: Nobel Prize in Literature
- 2004: Stig Dagerman Prize
- 2004: Mülheimer Dramatikerpreis for Das Werk
- 2009: Mülheimer Dramatikerpreis for Rechnitz (Der Würgeengel)
- 2011: Mülheimer Dramatikerpreis for Winterreise
- 2011: Honorary member of the American Academy of Arts and Letters
- 2017: Theatre prize Der Faust for lifetime achievement
- 2021: Honorary citizen of the City of Vienna
- 2021: Nestroy Theatre Prize for lifetime achievement

== Publications ==
=== Poetry ===
- Lisas Schatten; München 1967
- ende: gedichte von 1966–1968; München 2000 ISBN 978-3-935284-29-5
- Gesammelte Gedichte / Poésies complètes, trans. Magali Jourdan, Mathilde Sobottke (Vienna: Westphalie Verlag, 2014). ISBN 978-3-9502302-8-4

=== Novels ===
- bukolit.hörroman (written 1968, published by Rhombus Verlag, 1979). bukolit: audio novel.
- wir sind lockvögel baby! (Rowohlt, 1970).
- Michael. Ein Jugendbuch für die Infantilgesellschaft (Rowohlt, 1972).
- Die Liebhaberinnen (Rowohlt, 1975). Women as Lovers, trans. Martin Chalmers (London: Serpent's Tail, 1994). ISBN 978-1-85242-237-0.
- Die Ausgesperrten (Rowohlt, 1980). Wonderful, Wonderful Times, trans. Michael Hulse (London: Serpent's Tail, 1990). ISBN 978-1-85242-168-7.
- Die Klavierspielerin (Rowohlt, 1983). The Piano Teacher, trans. Joachim Neugroschel (New York: Weidenfeld & Nicolson, 1988). ISBN 978-1-55584-052-5.
- Oh Wildnis, oh Schutz vor ihr (Rowohlt, 1985).
- Lust (Rowohlt, 1989). Lust, trans. Michael Hulse (London: Serpent's Tail, 1992). ISBN 978-1-85242-183-0.
- Die Kinder der Toten (Rowohlt, 1995). The Children of the Dead, trans. Gitta Honegger (Yale, 2024).
- Gier (Rowohlt, 2000). Greed, trans. Martin Chalmers (London: Serpent's Tail, 2006). ISBN 978-1-85242-902-7.
- Neid (2007). Envy. Private novel published on Jelinek's website.
- rein GOLD. ein bühnenessay (Rowohlt, 2013). rein GOLD, trans. Gitta Honegger (Fitzcarraldo Editions, 2021).

=== Plays ===
- Was geschah, nachdem Nora ihren Mann verlassen hatte; oder Stützen der Gesellschaften (1979). What Happened after Nora Left Her Husband; or Pillars of Society. Premiered at Graz, October 1979.
- Clara S, musikalische Tragödie (1982). Clara S, a Musical Tragedy. Premiered at Bonn, 1982.
- Krankheit oder Moderne Frauen. Wie ein Stück (1984). Illness or Modern Women. Like a Play. Premiered at Bonn, 1987.
- Burgtheater. Posse mit Gesang (1985). Burgtheater. Farce with Songs. Premiered at Bonn, 1985.
- Begierde und Fahrererlaubnis (eine Pornographie) (1986). Desire and Permission to Drive – Pornography. Premiered at the Styrian Autumn, Graz, 1986.
- Wolken. Heim (1988). Clouds. Home. Premiered at Bonn, 1988.
- Präsident Abendwind. Ein Dramolett, sehr frei nach Johann Nestroy (1992). President Abendwind. A dramolet, very freely after Johann Nestroy. Premiered at Tyrol Landestheater, Innsbruck, 1992.
- Totenauberg (1992). Premiered at Burgtheater (Akademietheater), 1992.
- Raststätte oder Sie machens alle. Eine Komödie (1994). Service Area or They're All Doing It. A Comedy. Premiered at Burgtheater, 1994.
- Stecken, Stab und Stangl. Eine Handarbeit (1996). Rod, Staff, and Crook – Handmade. Premiered at Deutsches Schauspielhaus, 1996.
- Ein Sportstück (1998). Sports Play, trans. Penny Black (Oberon Books, 2012). Premiered at Burgtheater, 1998; English-language premiere in Lancaster, 11 July 2012. Also translated by Lillian Banks as Sports Chorus for the Museum of Contemporary Art in Krakow.
- er nicht als er (zu, mit Robert Walser) (1998). Her Not All Her: On/With Robert Walser, trans. Damion Searls (Sylph Editions, 2012). Premiered at Salzburg Festival in conjunction with Deutsches Schauspielhaus, 1998.
- Das Lebewohl (2000). Les Adieux. Premiered at Berliner Ensemble, 2000.
- Das Schweigen (2000). Silence. Premiered at Deutsches Schauspielhaus, 2000.
- Der Tod und das Mädchen II (2000). Death and the Maiden II. Premiered at Expo 2000 in conjunction with the Saarbrücken Staatstheater and ZKM Karlsruhe.
- MACHT NICHTS – Eine Kleine Trilogie des Todes (2001). NO PROBLEM – A Little Trilogy of Death. Premiered at Schauspielhaus Zürich, 2001.
- In den Alpen (2002). In the Alps. Premiered at Munich Kammerspiele in conjunction with Schauspielhaus Zürich, 2002.
- Prinzessinnendramen: Der Tod und das Mädchen I-III und IV-V (2002). Princess Dramas: Death and the Maiden I-III and IV-V. Parts I-III premiered at Deutsches Schauspielhaus, 2002; Parts IV-V premiered at Deutsches Theater, 2002.
- Das Werk (2003). Premiered at Burgtheater (Akademietheater), 2003.
- Bambiland (2003). Trans. Lilian Friedberg (2007). Premiered at Burgtheater, 2003.
- Irm und Margit A part of "Attabambi Pornoland" (2004). Premiered at Schauspielhaus Zürich, 2004.
- Ulrike Maria Stuart (2006). Premiered at Thalia Theater, 2006.
- Über Tiere (2006).
- Rechnitz (Der Würgeengel) (2008). Rechnitz (The Exterminating Angel).
- Die Kontrakte des Kaufmanns. Eine Wirtschaftskomödie (2009). The Merchant's Contracts.
- Das Werk / Im Bus / Ein Sturz (2010). Premiered at Schauspiel Köln, 2010.
- Winterreise (2011). Premiered at Munich Kammerspiele, 2011.
- Kein Licht (2011). Premiered at Schauspiel Köln, 2011
- FaustIn and out (2011). Premiered at Schauspielhaus Zürich, 2012.
- Die Straße. Die Stadt. Der Überfall (2012). Premiered at Munich Kammerspiele, 2012.
- Schatten (Eurydike sagt) (2013). Shadow. Eurydice Says, trans. Gitta Honegger (2017). Premiered at Burgtheater, 2013.
- Aber sicher! (2013). Premiered at Theater Bremen, 2013.
- Die Schutzbefohlenen (2013). Charges (The Supplicants), trans. Gitta Honegger (Seagull Books, 2016). First read at Hamburg, 2013; first produced at Mannheim, 23 May 2014.
- Das schweigende Mädchen (2014). Premiered at Munich, 27 September 2014.
- Wut (2016). Fury, trans. Gitta Honegger (Seagull Books, 2022). Premiered at Munich, 16 April 2016.
- Am Königsweg (2017). On the Royal Road: The Burgher King, trans. Gitta Honegger (Seagull Books, 2020). Premiered at Hamburg, 28 October 2017.
- Schnee Weiss (2018). Premiered at Cologne, 21 December 2018.
- Schwarzwasser (2020). Premiered at Vienna, 6 February 2020.
- Sonne, los jetzt! (2022). Premiered at Zürich, 15 December 2022.
- Angabe der Person (2022). Premiered at Berlin, 17 December 2022.
- Sonne / Luft (2022). Premiered at Zürich, 15 December 2022.
- Asche (2024). Premiered at Münich, 26 April 2024.
- Endsieg (2025).

=== Opera librettos ===
- Lost Highway (2003), adapted from the 1997 film by David Lynch, with music by Olga Neuwirth
- Monster's Paradise (2026), music by Olga Neuwirth

=== Translations ===
- Die Enden der Parabel (Gravity's Rainbow), novel by Thomas Pynchon; 1976
- Herrenjagd, drama by Georges Feydeau; 1983
- Floh im Ohr, drama by Georges Feydeau; 1986
- Der Gockel, drama by Georges Feydeau; 1986
- Die Affaire Rue de Lourcine, drama by Eugène Labiche; 1988
- Die Dame vom Maxim, drama by Georges Feydeau; 1990
- Der Jude von Malta (The Jew of Malta), drama by Christopher Marlowe; 2001
- Ernst sein ist alles (The Importance of Being Earnest), drama by Oscar Wilde; 2004
- Der ideale Mann (An Ideal Husband), drama by Oscar Wilde; 2011
- Poetry and short stories from Latin American authors

=== Jelinek's works in English translation ===
- The Piano Teacher, trans. Joachim Neugroschel (New York: Weidenfeld & Nicolson, 1988). ISBN 978-1-55584-052-5.
- Wonderful, Wonderful Times, trans. Michael Hulse (London: Serpent's Tail, 1990). ISBN 978-1-85242-168-7.
- Lust, trans. Michael Hulse (London: Serpent's Tail, 1992). ISBN 978-1-85242-183-0.
- Women as Lovers, trans. Martin Chalmers (London: Serpent's Tail, 1994). ISBN 978-1-85242-237-0.
- Greed, trans. Martin Chalmers (London: Serpent's Tail, 2006). ISBN 978-1-85242-902-7.
- Bambiland, trans. Lilian Friedberg (2009), in Theater 39.3, pp. 111–143.
- Her Not All Her: On/With Robert Walser, trans. Damion Searls (Sylph Editions, 2012).
- Sports Play, trans. Penny Black (Oberon Books, 2012).
- Sports Chorus, trans. Lilian Banks (2012), in Sport in Art, commissioned by Museum of Contemporary Art in Kraków.
- Rechnitz and The Merchant's Contracts, trans. Gitta Honegger (Seagull Books, 2015). ISBN 978-0-85742-225-5.
- Charges (The Supplicants), trans. Gitta Honegger (Seagull Books, 2016). ISBN 978-0-85742-330-6.
- Three Plays: Rechnitz, The Merchant's Contracts, Charges (The Supplicants), trans. Gitta Honegger (Seagull Books, 2019).
- On the Royal Road: The Burgher King, trans. Gitta Honegger (Seagull Books, 2020).
- rein GOLD, trans. Gitta Honegger (Fitzcarraldo Editions, 2021).
- The Children of the Dead, trans. Gitta Honegger (Yale, 2024).
- Screeds, trans. Gitta Honegger (New Directions, 2026). Compilation of two plays: On the Royal Road and Endsieg: The Second Coming.

== In popular culture ==
Her novel The Piano Teacher was the basis for the 2001 film of the same title by Austrian director Michael Haneke, starring Isabelle Huppert as the protagonist.

In 2022, a documentary about Jelinek was created by Claudia Müller, Elfriede Jelinek – Language Unleashed (German: Elfriede Jelinek – Die Sprache von der Leine lassen).

== See also ==
- List of female Nobel laureates
- List of Austrian writers
- List of Jewish Nobel laureates
