= The Rings of Saturn =

1995 novel by W.G. Sebald

- First edition
- Author: W. G. Sebald
- Original title: Die Ringe des Saturn
- Translator: Michael Hulse
- Language: German
- Publisher: Eichborn
- Publication date: 1995
- Publication place: Germany
- English publication date: 1998
- Media type: Print
- Pages: 371
- ISBN: 3-8218-4448-5
- OCLC: 34139506
- LC Class: PT2681.E18

The Rings of Saturn (German: Die Ringe des Saturn: Eine englische Wallfahrt - An English Pilgrimage) is a 1995 novel by the German writer W. G. Sebald. Its first-person narrative arc is the account by a nameless narrator (who resembles the author in typical Sebaldian fashion) on a walking tour of Suffolk. In addition to describing the places he sees and people he encounters, including translator Michael Hamburger, Sebald discusses various episodes of history and literature, including the introduction of silkworm cultivation to Europe, and the writings of Thomas Browne, which attach in some way to the larger text. The book was published in English in 1998.

== Genre and content ==
Combining the details of a walking tour with meditations prompted by places and people encountered on that tour, The Rings of Saturn was called "a hybrid of a book – fiction, travel, biography, myth, and memoir".

== Themes and style ==
Themes in the book are those treated in Sebald's other books: time, memory, and identity. According to Patrick Lennon's "In the Weaver's Web" (and Mark McCulloh's Understanding W. G. Sebald), The Rings of Saturn merges the identities of the Sebaldian narrator with that of Michael Hamburger – Sebald and Hamburger both being German writers who moved to England and shared other important experiences. What's more, Hamburger's identity becomes fused with that of Friedrich Hölderlin, and the merging is emphasized by Sebald's (typical) omission of quotation marks for quotations, further eroding the separation of speakers in Sebald's account of the narrator's recollection of Hamburger's recollection. The significance of time's passage, and the distances between the past, present and future, are also eroded. Sebald flattens the temporal hierarchy of meaning, by giving equal significance to historical and modern events. According to Anne-Laure Fortin-Tournès, "Sebald's intermedial narrative is ruination at work, but ruination as a preliminary to the experience of kairos, i.e. to the experience of an epiphanic sense of presence to the nature of our time-being, during which it is time itself that becomes an event." As in all his novels, Sebald writes in very long, complex sentences. The German original is written in a curiously quaint and somewhat precious and old-fashioned language that often disregards the common placement of German verbs at the end of sentences and instead puts them in unusual places.

== Title ==
The title of the book may be associated with thematic content contained in the two passages – one appearing as part of the book's epigraph, the other in the fourth chapter, which mentions Saturn – hinting at both astronomical and mythological associations for Sebald's use of the word:

The rings of Saturn consist of ice crystals and probably meteorite particles describing circular orbits around the planet's equator. In all likelihood these are fragments of a former moon that was too close to the planet and was destroyed by its tidal effect.

As I sat there in Southwold overlooking the German Ocean, I sensed quite clearly the earth's slow turning into the dark. The huntsmen are up in America, wrote Thomas Browne in the Garden of Cyrus and they are already past their first sleep in Persia. The shadow of the night is drawn like a black veil across the earth, and since almost all creatures, from one meridian to the next, lie down after the sun has set, so, he continues, one might, in following the setting sun, see on our globe nothing but prone bodies, row upon row, as if leveled by the scythe of Saturn – an endless graveyard for a humanity struck by falling sickness.

== Editions ==
- Sebald, W. G. (1998). The Rings of Saturn. London: New Directions Books. ISBN 978-0-8112-1378-3.
- Sebald, W. G. (1995). Die Ringe des Saturn: Eine englische Wallfahrt (in German). Frankfurt am Main: Eichborn Verlag. ISBN 978-3-8218-4448-0.

== Adaptations ==
The 2012 film, Patience (After Sebald), directed by Grant Gee is based on the book.
