= Rowohlt Verlag =

German publishing house

- Company logo
- Parent company: Georg von Holtzbrinck Group
- Status: Active
- Founded: 1908; 117 years ago
- Founder: Ernst Rowohlt
- Country of origin: Germany
- Headquarters location: Hamburg
- Official website: rowohlt.de

Rowohlt Verlag is a German publishing house based in Hamburg, with offices in Reinbek and Berlin. It has been part of the Georg von Holtzbrinck Group since 1982. The company has been dissolved and restarted twice since its creation in 1908.

== History ==
Rowohlt Verlag was founded in 1908 in Leipzig by Ernst Rowohlt and was renamed to Kurt Wolff Verlag in February 1913. After Rowohlt was banned from the German Publishers Association in October 1938 for "camouflaging Jewish authors", Rowohlt Verlag became a subsidiary of Deutsche Verlags-Anstalt, which was closed on 1 November 1943. On 9 November 1945, Rowohlt's oldest son, Heinrich Maria Ledig-Rowohlt, relaunched Rowohlt Verlag in Stuttgart.

== Notable authors ==
- 50 Cent
- Paul Auster
- Simone de Beauvoir
- Wolfgang Borchert
- Albert Camus
- C. W. Ceram
- Michael Chabon
- A. J. Cronin
- Friedrich Dürrenmatt
- Buddy Elias
- Jeffrey Eugenides
- Hans Fallada
- William Faulkner
- Jon Fosse
- Jonathan Franzen
- Max Goldt
- Ernest Hemingway
- Felicitas Hoppe
- Siri Hustvedt
- Heinrich Eduard Jacob
- Elfriede Jelinek
- Daniel Kehlmann
- Imre Kertész
- Georg Klein
- Henry Miller
- Toni Morrison
- Robert Musil
- Vladimir Nabokov
- Péter Nádas
- John Dos Passos
- Harold Pinter
- Oleg Postnov
- James Purdy
- Thomas Pynchon
- Uwe Reimer
- Philip Roth
- Peter Rühmkorf
- José Saramago
- Jean-Paul Sartre
- Sylke Tempel
- Kurt Tucholsky
- John Updike
- Ernst von Salomon
