= Columbia University in popular culture =

Low Memorial Library and Alma Mater as depicted in the Daredevil comics

Columbia University in New York City, New York, as one of the oldest universities in the United States, has been the subject of numerous aspects of popular culture. Film historian Rob King explains that the university's popularity with filmmakers has to do with its being one of the few colleges with a physical campus located in New York City, and its neoclassical architecture, which "aestheticizes America’s intellectual history," making Columbia an ideal shooting location and setting for productions that involve urban universities. Additionally, campus monuments such as Alma Mater and the university's copy of The Thinker have come to symbolize academic reflection and university prestige in popular culture. Room 309 in Havemeyer Hall has been described as the most filmed college classroom in the United States.

Historical events on Columbia's campus have also served to draw attention to the university. The Beat Generation, which began at Columbia with students Allen Ginsberg, Jack Kerouac, and Lucien Carr, among others, is often associated with the university, which served as a conservative backdrop to the writers' literary experimentation. The university has often been portrayed in relation to the movement, including in Vanity of Duluoz by Kerouac and the film Kill Your Darlings, which depicts the earliest days of the movement at Columbia.

The Columbia University protests of 1968 were the target of heavy media attention while they transpired, and since have been the subject of numerous depictions, including memoirs, such as The Strawberry Statement by James Simon Kunen and the film based on it; novels, such as 4 3 2 1 by Paul Auster; films, such as Across the Universe and 84 Charing Cross Road; and numerous documentaries, including Columbia Revolt and A Time to Stir, edited by Paul Cronin. The protests have also been the subject of significant academic inquiry, and have, along with subsequent protests throughout the decades, cemented Columbia's reputation as a hotbed for counterculture and student activism.

== Film ==
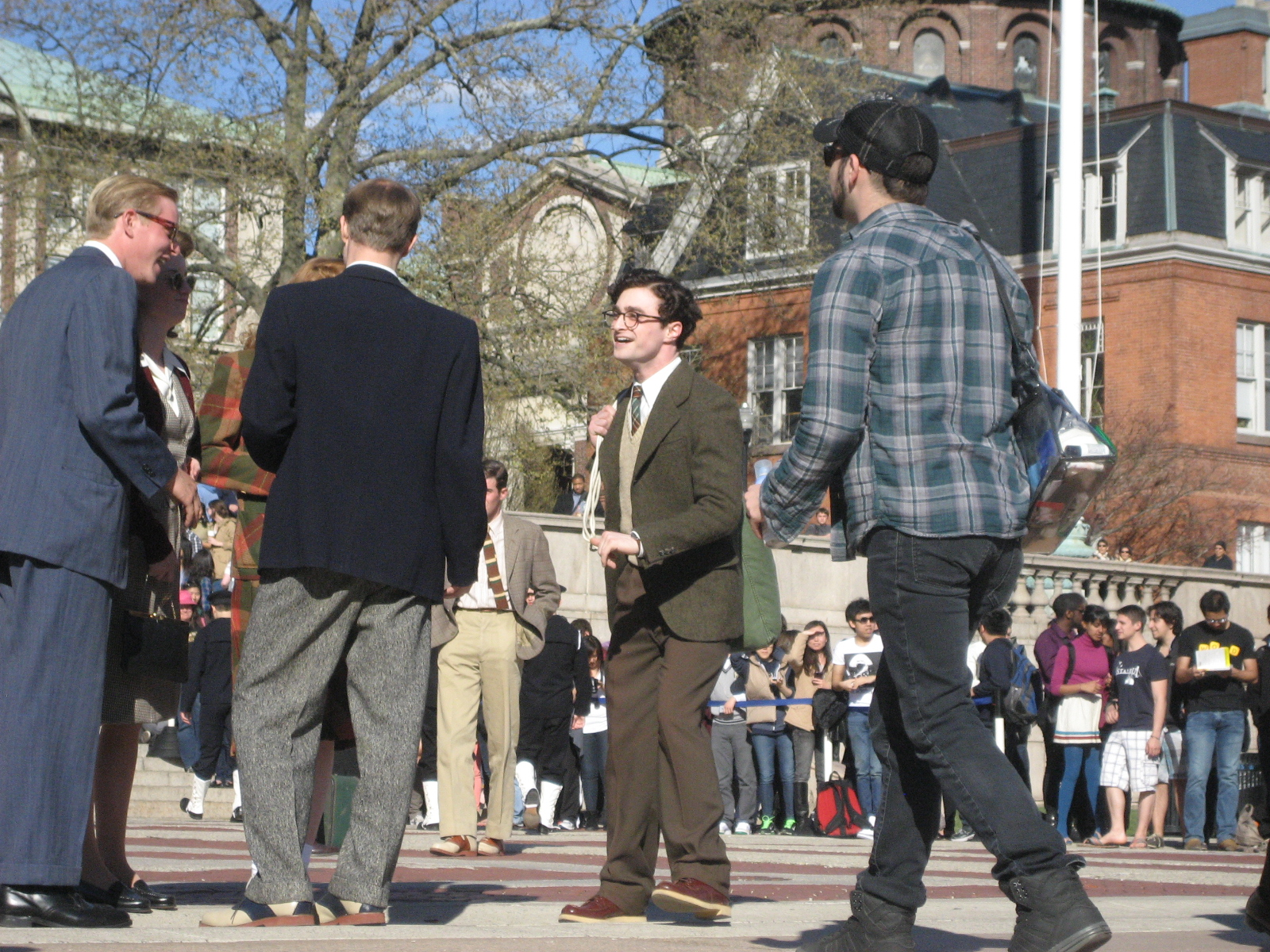
Daniel Radcliffe on Low Steps filming Kill Your Darlings, 2012

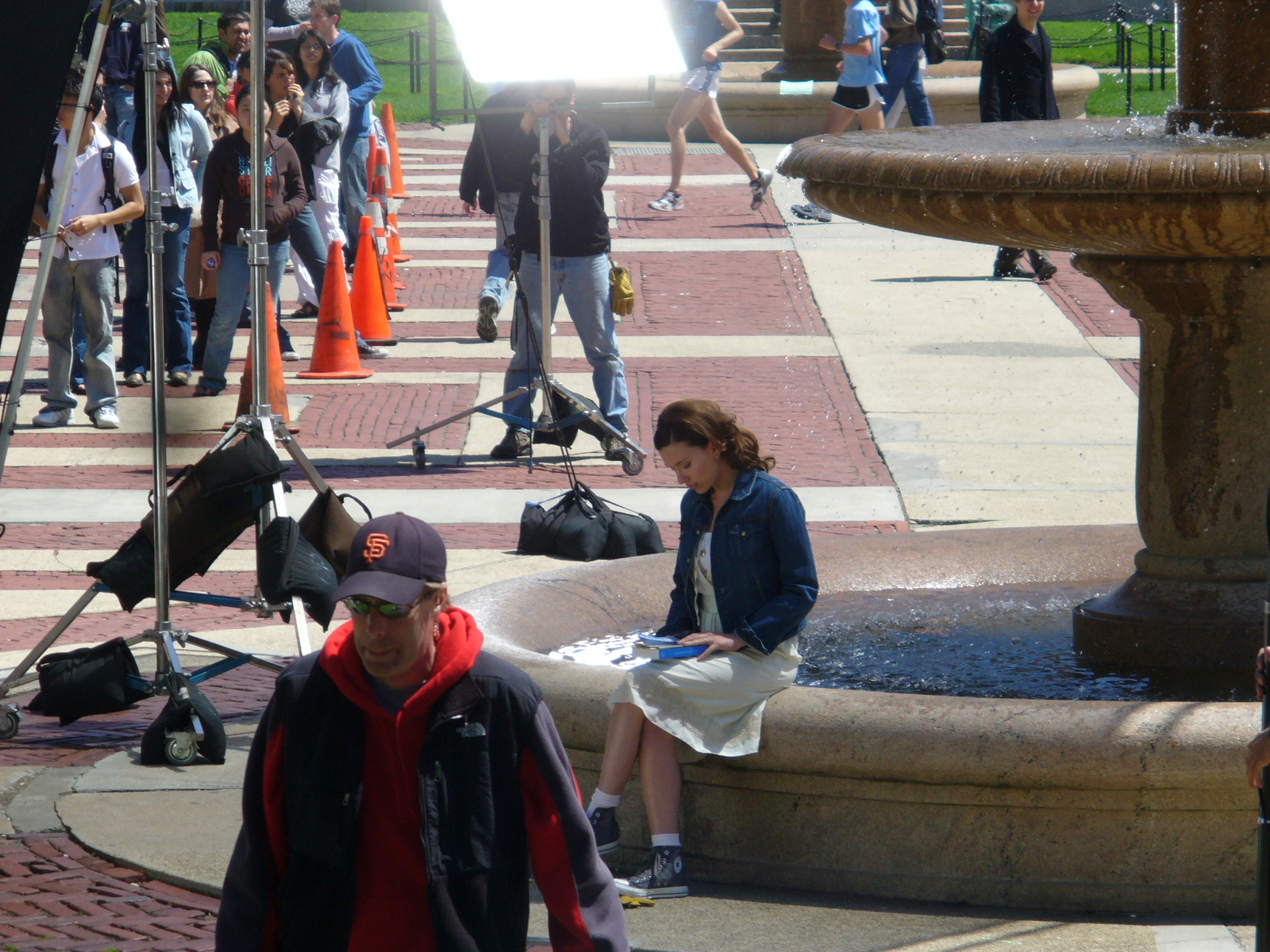
Scarlett Johansson at Columbia University during the shooting of The Nanny Diaries, 2006

Movies making reference to Columbia and/or featuring scenes shot on Columbia's campus include:

- 3 lbs
- Across the Universe
- Altered States
- Anger Management
- August Rush
- Awakenings
- Black and White
- Butterfield 8
- Charlie Bartlett
- Crimes and Misdemeanors
- Cruising
- The Detective
- Digimon Adventure: Last Evolution Kizuna
- Enchanted
- Eternal Sunshine of the Spotless Mind
- Everyone Says I Love You
- Finding Forrester
- Ghostbusters
- Ghostbusters (2016)
- Ghostbusters II
- Hannah and Her Sisters
- Hitch
- Husbands and Wives
- Igby Goes Down
- Ishtar
- It's My Turn
- K-PAX
- Kabhi Alvida Na Kehna
- Kill Your Darlings
- Kinsey
- Love the Hard Way
- Made of Honor
- The Magic Garden of Stanley Sweetheart
- Malcolm X
- Manhattan
- Marathon Man
- A Midsummer Night's Sex Comedy
- The Mirror Has Two Faces
- Mona Lisa Smile
- Music of the Heart
- The Nanny Diaries
- New York Minute
- North
- Porn 'n Chicken'
- The Post
- Premium Rush
- The Pride of the Yankees
- The Princess Diaries
- The Producers: The Movie Musical
- P.S.
- Punchline
- Quiz Show
- Real Women Have Curves
- The Rock
- Rollover
- Simon
- The Sisterhood of the Traveling Pants
- Spider-Man
- Spider-Man 2
- Spider-Man 3
- Stay
- Still Alice
- Ta Ra Rum Pum
- Tadpole
- Teacher's Pet
- The Words

== Music ==
- The music video for the Fugees' single "Nappy Heads" (recorded in 1992 but not released until 1994) was partially shot on the steps of Low Library of Columbia University, where one of the members, Lauryn Hill, was a student.
- The Indigo Girls song, "Free of Hope," contains the lyrics "Big brother's at Columbia University; quote unquote, he's tanning beaver pelts."
- Recording artist Nellie McKay released a song on her second album Pretty Little Head (2006), entitled "Columbia Is Bleeding", alleging animal abuse as part of the practice of animal testing at Columbia University.
- Vampire Weekend, which was founded at Columbia, frequently references the university in its lyrics, including in "Oxford Comma", "Harmony Hall", and "One (Blake's Got a New Face)".

== Video games ==
Due to its location in Manhattan, Columbia's campus frequently appears in video games that seek to replicate New York City in their maps, such as Grand Theft Auto IV (2008), as Vespucci University in the neighborhood of Varsity Heights; Assassin's Creed III (2012), as King's College in the late 18th century; and Marvel's Spider-Man (2018) and Spider-Man 2 (2023). The designs for university buildings in Cities: Skylines are based on the neoclassical architecture of the university.

== Fictional Columbians ==
Character	Appearances	Notes	Source
Grace Adler	Will & Grace; portrayed by Debra Messing	Graduate of Columbia College. In the show, she and Will Truman met at a party in Carman Hall.	
Meg Altman	Panic Room, directed by David Fincher; portrayed by Jodie Foster	Attends Columbia in the film	
Andie Anderson	How to Lose a Guy in 10 Days, directed by Donald Petrie; portrayed by Kate Hudson	Graduate of the School of Journalism	
Paul Andrews	Broken City, directed by Allen Hughes; portrayed by Kyle Chandler	Graduate of Columbia	
Nate Archibald	Gossip Girl; portrayed by Chace Crawford	Attends Columbia in the show	
Paul Armstrong	Just Cause, directed by Arne Glimcher; portrayed by Sean Connery	Graduate of Columbia Law School	
Rachel Armstrong	Nothing but the Truth, directed by Rod Lurie; portrayed by Kate Beckinsale	Graduate of the School of Journalism	
Radhika Banerjee Singh	Ta Ra Rum Pum, directed by Siddharth Anand; portrayed by Rani Mukerji	Is majoring in music at Columbia when she meets Rajveer Singh (portrayed by Saif Ali Khan)	
Zoe Barry	Something's Gotta Give, directed by Nancy Meyers; portrayed by Frances McDormand	Professor of women's studies	
Bender	Futurama; voiced by John DiMaggio	Attends "Columbiac University" in the episode "Free Will Hunting"	
Naomi Bennett	Private Practice; portrayed by Audra McDonald	Graduate of the College of Physicians and Surgeons	
Sam Bennett	Private Practice; portrayed by Taye Diggs	Graduate of the College of Physicians and Surgeons	
Serena Benson	Law & Order: Special Victims Unit; portrayed by Elizabeth Ashley	Graduate of either Columbia College or Barnard College	
Charles Bigelow	Strange Invaders, directed by Michael Laughlin; portrayed by Paul Le Mat	Professor	
James Brennan	Adventureland, directed by Greg Mottola; portrayed by Jesse Eisenberg	Is a college graduate slated to attend the Graduate School of Journalism	
Buckaroo Bonzai	The Adventures of Buckaroo Banzai Across the 8th Dimension, directed by W. D. Richter; portrayed by Peter Weller	Implied to have been a professor at the College of Physicians and Surgeons	
Matt Camden	7th Heaven; portrayed by Barry Watson	Attends the College of Physicians and Surgeons in the show	
Billy Campbell	Apartment, by Teddy Wayne	Attends the School of Arts in the book, along with the unnamed narrator	
Alexis Castle	Castle; portrayed by Molly Quinn	Attends Columbia in the show	
Quentin Coldwater	The Magicians; portrayed by Jason Ralph	Graduate of Columbia College	
Richard Cooper	I Think I Love My Wife, directed by Chris Rock; portrayed by Chris Rock	An MBA degree from Columbia can be seen hanging in his office.	
Ken Cosgrove	Mad Men; portrayed by Aaron Staton	Graduate of Columbia	
Kevin Cozner	Brooklyn Nine-Nine; portrayed by Marc Evan Jackson	Professor of classics	
Daredevil/Matt Murdock	Marvel Comics	Valedictorian of his class at Columbia Law School. In the comics, he also studies pre-law at Columbia College.	
Jessica Darling	The Jessica Darling books, by Megan McCafferty	Attends Columbia in the books	
Samuel Davenport	Archive 81; portrayed by Evan Jonigkeit	Professor of renaissance and medieval studies	
Finn DeTrolio	The Sopranos; portrayed by Will Janowitz	Attends Columbia in the show, studying dentistry	
Jack Duluoz	Vanity of Duluoz, by Jack Kerouac	Attends Columbia College in the book, which is based on Kerouac's own time at the university	
Marshall Emerson	For Kings and Planets, by Ethan Canin	Attends Columbia in the book	
Marshall Eriksen	How I Met Your Mother; portrayed by Jason Segel	Graduate of Columbia Law School	
F. Scott Feinstadt	P.S., directed by Dylan Kidd; portrayed by Topher Grace	Is accepted at the School of Arts following an affair with an admissions officer	
Archie Ferguson	4 3 2 1, by Paul Auster	Attends Columbia around the 1968 protests	
Firestorm/Jason Rusch	DC Comics	Attends Columbia in the comics	
Flag-Smasher/Karl Morgenthau	Marvel Comics	Studies political science as an undergraduate student	
Joel Fleishman	Northern Exposure; portrayed by Rob Morrow	Graduate of the College of Physicians and Surgeons	
Marco Stanley Fogg	Moon Palace, by Paul Auster	Attends Columbia College in the book	
Eric Foreman	House; portrayed by Omar Epps	Studied biochemistry at the university on a full scholarship	
Colin Forrester	Gossip Girl; portrayed by Samuel Page	Visiting professor	
Gabriel the Devil Hunter	Marvel Comics	Is described as "a scholar at Columbia University"	
Ana García	Real Women Have Curves, directed by Patricia Cardoso; portrayed by America Ferrera	Is accepted at Columbia with a full scholarship in the film	
Ross Geller	Friends; portrayed by David Schwimmer	Holds a PhD in paleontology from Columbia	
Erin Gilbert	Ghostbusters, directed by Paul Feig; portrayed by Kristen Wiig	Professor of physics	
Sarah Glass	7th Heaven; portrayed by Sarah Danielle Madison	Attends the College of Physicians and Surgeons in the show	
Robert Goldman	Marvel Comics	Graduate of Columbia Law School	
Stanley Goodspeed	The Rock, directed by Michael Bay; portrayed by Nicolas Cage	Graduate of Columbia College	
Lucas Goodwin	House of Cards, portrayed by Sebastian Arcelus	A Columbia degree can be seen hanging in his office.	
Bram Greenfeld	Simon vs. the Homo Sapiens Agenda, by Becky Albertalli	Is accepted early decision to Columbia	
Ben Gross	Never Have I Ever, portrayed by Jaren Lewison	Is accepted at and attends Columbia in the show	
Louise Harrington	P.S., directed by Dylan Kidd; portrayed by Laura Linney	Director of admissions at the School of the Arts	
Alexander Hartdegen	The Time Machine, directed by Simon Wells; portrayed by Guy Pearce	Professor of applied mechanics and engineering	
Miles Heller	Sunset Park, by Paul Auster	Graduate student at Columbia; withdrew before the events of the novel	
Miranda Hobbes	Sex and the City, And Just Like That...; portrayed by Cynthia Nixon	Attends Columbia in And Just Like That...	
Dave Hodgman	The First Time, directed by Jonathan Kasdan; portrayed by Dylan O'Brien	Is a high school senior slated to attend Columbia in the fall	
Beatrice Horseman	BoJack Horseman; voiced by Wendie Malick	Graduate of Barnard College	
Alice Howland	Still Alice, directed by Richard Glatzer and Wash Westmoreland; portrayed by Julianne Moore	Professor of linguistics	
Isbisa/Simon Meke	Marvel Comics	Professor of physics	
Linda Jackson	Anchorman 2: The Legend Continues, directed by Adam McKay; portrayed by Meagan Good	Graduate of the School of Journalism	
Rosie Jarman	The Rosie Project, The Rosie Effect, and The Rosie Result, by Graeme Simsion	Attends the College of Physicians and Surgeons in The Rosie Effect	
Emily Jessup	Altered States, directed by Ken Russell; portrayed by Blair Brown	Is a PhD student in physical anthropology in the film	
Jess Jordan	Succession; portrayed by Juliana Canfield	Graduate of Columbia Law School	
Willie Keith	The Caine Mutiny, by Herman Wouk	At the beginning of the book, is a student at the Columbia University Midshipmen's School, which operated during World War II	
Candace Kelmeckis	The Perks of Being a Wallflower, directed by Stephen Chbosky; portrayed by Nina Dobrev	Is a high school senior slated to attend Columbia in the fall	
Mindy Lahiri	The Mindy Project; portrayed by Mindy Kaling	Graduate of the College of Physicians and Surgeons	
Todd Lancaster	Broken City, directed by Allen Hughes; portrayed by James Ransone	Graduate of Columbia	
Gregory Larkin	The Mirror Has Two Faces, directed by Barbra Streisand; portrayed by Jeff Bridges	Professor of mathematics	
Karen Wagner Leland	The Detective, directed by Gordon Douglas; portrayed by Lee Remick	Professor	
Thomas "Babe" Levy	Marathon Man, directed by John Schlesinger; portrayed by Dustin Hoffman	Is a PhD student at Columbia in the film	
Lizard/Curt Connors	Spider-Man 2, and Spider-Man 3, directed by Sam Raimi; portrayed by Dylan Baker	Professor of physics	
Kate Lloyd	The Thing, directed by Matthijs van Heijningen Jr.; portrayed by Mary Elizabeth Winstead	Studied paleontology at Columbia	
Veronica Lodge	Riverdale; portrayed by Camila Mendes	Graduate of Barnard College	
Kim Joo-won	Secret Garden; portrayed by Hyun Bin	Graduate of Columbia	
Justice/Vance Astrovik	Marvel Comics	Attends Columbia, and re-enrolls after going to jail for killing his father	
Carl Luce	The Catcher in the Rye, by J. D. Salinger	Columbia College student and former classmate of Holden Caulfield	
Dinah Madani	The Punisher; portrayed by Amber Rose Revah	Holds a master's degree in Islamic studies from Columbia	
Veronica Mars	Veronica Mars; portrayed by Kristen Bell	Attends Columbia Law School in the show	
Tracy McConnell	How I Met Your Mother; portrayed by Cristin Milioti	Studied economics at Columbia	
Joy Meachum	Iron Fist; portrayed by Jessica Stroup	Graduate of Columbia Law School	
Mister Fear/Larry Cranston	Marvel Comics	Professor at Columbia Law School, under the name Harold Cranstone	
Simon Mendelssohn	Simon, directed by Marshall Brickman; portrayed by Alan Arkin	Professor of psychology	
Lucrecia Montesinos Hendrich	Elite; portrayed by Danna Paola	Attends Columbia in the show	
Addison Montgomery	Grey's Anatomy; portrayed by Kate Walsh	Graduate of the College of Physicians and Surgeons	
Rose Morgan	The Mirror Has Two Faces, directed by Barbra Streisand; portrayed by Barbra Streisand	Professor of English literature	
Michael Moscovitz	The Princess Diaries, by Meg Cabot	Attends Columbia in the books	
Ted Mosby	How I Met Your Mother; portrayed by Josh Radnor	Becomes a professor of architecture in the show	
Sammy Mourad	The 39 Clues, by various authors	Postdoctoral researcher in biochemistry	
Elektra Natchios	Marvel Comics; Daredevil, directed by Mark Steven Johnson; portrayed by Jennifer Garner	Graduate of Columbia Law School	
Foggy Nelson	Marvel Comics; Daredevil, directed by Mark Steven Johnson; portrayed by Jon Favreau	Graduate of Columbia Law School	
Roland Nilson	The Switch, directed by Will Speck and Josh Gordon; portrayed by Patrick Wilson	Professor of English	
Erica Noughton	Nip/Tuck; portrayed by Vanessa Redgrave	Holds a PhD in clinical psychology from Columbia	
Sarah Obeng	Queen of Glory, directed by Nana Mensah; portrayed by Nana Mensah	Doctoral student in neuro-oncology	
Oliver	Call Me by Your Name, by André Aciman; Call Me by Your Name, directed by Luca Guadagnino; portrayed by Armie Hammer	Postdoctoral researcher in classics	
Harry Osborn	Spider-Man, Spider-Man 2, and Spider-Man 3, directed by Sam Raimi; portrayed by James Franco	Attends Columbia in Spider-Man 2 and Spider-Man 3	
Camille Parks	Harlem; portrayed by Meagan Good	Professor of anthropology	
Mitchell Pritchett	Modern Family; portrayed by Jesse Tyler Ferguson	Graduate of Columbia Law School	
Quiet Man	Marvel Comics	Attended Columbia	
Clare Quilty	Lolita, by Vladimir Nabokov	Attended Columbia	
Wendell Rand	Iron Fist; portrayed by David Furr	Graduate of Columbia	
Erin Reagan	Blue Bloods; portrayed by Bridget Moynahan	Graduate of Columbia	
Nicky Reagan-Boyle	Blue Bloods; portrayed by Sami Gayle	Attends and graduates from Columbia in the show	
Esteban Reyes	Weeds; portrayed by Demián Bichir	Graduate of Columbia	
Rachel Rose	Keeping the Faith, directed by Edward Norton; portrayed by Rena Sofer	Graduate of the School of Journalism	
Jamie Ross	Law & Order and Law & Order: Trial by Jury; portrayed by Carey Lowell	Graduate of Columbia Law School	
Kendall Roy	Succession; portrayed by Jeremy Strong	Graduate of Columbia Business School	
Artur Sammler	Mr. Sammler's Planet, by Saul Bellow	Lectures at Columbia in the book	
Sheila Sazs	Suits; portrayed by Rachael Harris	Head of admissions	
Kimmy Schmidt	Unbreakable Kimmy Schmidt; portrayed by Ellie Kemper	Attends, and is expelled from, Columbia in the show	
Carol Seaver	Growing Pains; portrayed by Tracey Gold	Attends Columbia in the show	
Mark Sloan	Grey's Anatomy; portrayed by Eric Dane	Graduate of the College of Physicians and Surgeons	
Mister Fantastic/Reed Richards	Marvel Comics	Holds a doctorate from Columbia	
Edward H. Simpson	Jurassic Park, by Michael Crichton	Emeritus professor of zoology	
Ollie Slocumb	Igby Goes Down, directed by Burr Steers; portrayed by Ryan Phillippe	Attends Columbia as an economics major in the film	
Nadia Shanaa	Elite; portrayed by Mina El Hammani	Attends Columbia in the show	
Juliet Sharp	Gossip Girl; portrayed by Katie Cassidy	Attends Columbia in the show	
Jack Shephard	Lost; portrayed by Matthew Fox	Graduate of Columbia	
Derek Shepherd	Grey's Anatomy; portrayed by Patrick Dempsey	Graduate of the College of Physicians and Surgeons	
Meadow Soprano	The Sopranos; portrayed by Jamie-Lynn Sigler	Attends Columbia College in the show	
Jessie Spano	Saved by the Bell; portrayed by Elizabeth Berkley	Attends Columbia in the show's spinoff, Saved by the Bell: The College Years	
Egon Spengler	Ghostbusters; portrayed by Harold Ramis	Professor of parapsychology at Columbia before forming the Ghostbusters	
Spider-Man/Peter Parker	Spider-Man, Spider-Man 2, and Spider-Man 3, directed by Sam Raimi; portrayed by Tobey Maguire	Acquires his powers at a Columbia laboratory, and later attends the university in Spider-Man 2 and Spider-Man 3	
Gwen Stacy	Spider-Man 3, directed by Sam Raimi; portrayed by Bryce Dallas Howard	Attends Columbia in the film	
Ray Stantz	Ghostbusters; portrayed by Dan Aykroyd	Professor of parapsychology at Columbia before forming the Ghostbusters	
Martin Stein	DC Comics	Professor of physics	
Richard Stone	Jurassic Park, by Michael Crichton	Head of the Tropical Diseases Laboratory of the Columbia University Medical Center	
Doctor Strange	Marvel Comics	Graduate of the College of Physicians and Surgeons; resident at the NewYork-Presbyterian Hospital for five years	
David Strom	The Time of Our Singing, by Richard Powers	Is a physicist at Columbia	
Superwoman/Kristin Wells	DC Comics	Graduate student and later professor of history	
Stanley Sweetheart	The Magic Garden of Stanley Sweetheart, directed by Leonard Horn; portrayed by Don Johnson	Attends Columbia in the film	
Lance Sweets	Bones; portrayed by John Francis Daley	Holds doctorates in clinical psychology and behavioral analysis from Columbia	
Oluwakemi "Kemi" Talbot	Veep; portrayed by Toks Olagundoye	Graduate of Columbia College and Columbia Law School	
Orno Tarcher	For Kings and Planets, by Ethan Canin	Attends Columbia in the book	
Don Tillman	The Rosie Project, The Rosie Effect, and The Rosie Result, by Graeme Simsion	Visiting professor at the College of Physicians and Surgeons	
Will Truman	Will & Grace; portrayed by Eric McCormack	Graduate of Columbia College	
Taissa Turner	Yellowjackets; portrayed by Tawny Cypress and Jasmin Savoy Brown	Graduate of Columbia Law School	
Val Tyler	What I Like About You; portrayed by Jennie Garth	Holds a degree in public relations from Columbia	
Serena van der Woodsen	Gossip Girl; portrayed by Blake Lively	Attends Columbia in the show	
Macy Vaughn	Charmed; portrayed by Madeleine Mantock	Holds an MA and PhD in genetics	
Iris Vegan	The Blindfold, by Siri Hustvedt	Is a graduate student at Columbia in the book	
Peter Venkman	Ghostbusters; portrayed by Bill Murray	Professor of parapsychology at Columbia before forming the Ghostbusters	
Blair Waldorf	Gossip Girl; portrayed by Leighton Meester	Attends Columbia in the show	
Adam Walker	Invisible, by Paul Auster	Attends Columbia in the book, and befriends political science professor Rudolf Born	
Matty Walker	Body Heat, directed by Lawrence Kasdan; portrayed by Kathleen Turner	Graduate of Columbia Law School	
Mara Waters	The Au Pairs, by Melissa de la Cruz	Decides to attend Columbia in the book	
Abe Weissman	The Marvelous Mrs. Maisel; portrayed by Tony Shalhoub	Tenured professor at the university	
Iris West	DC Comics	Graduate of Columbia	
McAfee Westbrook	The Politician; portrayed by Laura Dreyfuss	Graduates in the show.	
Angela Wheatley	Law & Order: Organized Crime; portrayed by Tamara Taylor	Professor of mathematics	
Julia Wicker	The Magicians; portrayed by Stella Maeve	Graduate of Columbia College	
James Wilson	House; portrayed by Robert Sean Leonard	Graduate of the College of Physicians and Surgeons	
Lee Wing	Marvel Comics	Professor of Oriental studies	
Wyatt Wingfoot	Marvel Comics	Briefly attended	
Frank Wheeler	Revolutionary Road, by Richard Yates	Described as an "intense, nicotine-stained, Jean-Paul Sartre sort of man" while a student	
Harold Woodsman	Amsterdam, directed by David O. Russell; portrayed by John David Washington	Graduate of Columbia Law School	
Professor X	Marvel Comics	Holds a PhD in anthropology from Columbia; professor of biology	
Boris Yelnikoff	Whatever Works, directed by Woody Allen; portrayed by Larry David	Professor of physics	
Leopold York	Marvel Comics	Professor of law	
Rachel Zane	Suits; portrayed by Meghan Markle	Attends Columbia Law School in the show	
Toby Ziegler	The West Wing; portrayed by Richard Schiff	Professor at Columbia, following his dismissal by President Josiah Bartlet	
Sidney Zwiebel/"New Jersey"	The Adventures of Buckaroo Banzai Across the 8th Dimension, directed by W. D. Richter; portrayed by Jeff Goldblum	Implied to have been a professor at the College of Physicians and Surgeons	
