= The Book of Illusions =

2002 novel by Paul Auster

- First edition
- Author: Paul Auster
- Language: English
- Publisher: Henry Holt
- Publication date: 2002
- Publication place: United States
- Media type: Print (Hardback & Paperback)
- Pages: 232 pp (hardback edition)
- ISBN: 0-8050-5408-1
- OCLC: 52640380
- Preceded by: Timbuktu
- Followed by: Oracle Night

The Book of Illusions is a novel by American writer Paul Auster, published in 2002. It was nominated for the International Dublin Literary Award in 2004.

== Plot introduction ==
Set in the late 1980s, the story is written from the perspective of David Zimmer, a university professor who, after losing his wife and children in a plane crash, falls into a routine of depression and isolation. After seeing one of the silent comedies of Hector Mann, an actor missing since the 1920s, he decides to occupy himself by watching all of Mann's films and writing a book about them. The publishing of the book, however, triggers another series of events that draw Zimmer even deeper into the actor's past.

The middle of the story is largely dedicated to telling the life story of Hector Mann, involving his self-imposed exile from his past life and career, which serves as a form of penance for his role in the death of a woman who loved him. In his last days, Mann's wife sends a letter to Zimmer, requesting him to come to their New Mexico home to bear witness to Mann's final legacy of films. The events that ensue form the overarching story of Zimmer's rehabilitation from his reclusive state, and his coming to terms with the manner in which his family was killed.

== Links to other works ==
The book makes many direct references to the autobiography of François-René de Chateaubriand, Mémoires d'Outre-Tombe; one of Zimmer's ongoing projects is producing a new translation of the book.

David Zimmer appears in Auster's earlier novel Moon Palace.

The Book of Illusions revisits a number of plot elements seen in Auster's first major work, The New York Trilogy. These include:

- The protagonist driving himself into isolation
- Extended focus on a character's (fictional) body of work
- Writers as characters
- A character disappearing, only to resurface years later, having spent some of the intervening years wandering and doing odd jobs
- Parallels drawn between a work of Nathaniel Hawthorne and the plot itself
- Notebooks (also in Oracle Night)
- A meta-referential ending that places the protagonist as the author of the book itself

In addition, the book also bears the stylistic distinction of not using quotation marks; Auster has previously used this in Ghosts, the second book of The New York Trilogy and Travels in the Scriptorium. He also does this in his later book, Invisible.

== The Silent World of Hector Mann ==
The Silent World of Hector Mann is an album by Duke Special inspired by the character Hector Mann, with each song itself based on a film written by a different songwriter.

== Reception ==
James Wood, a critic of Auster's work, nevertheless named it as 'probably his best novel.' He praised Auster's 'painstaking and vivid fictional re-creation of the career of a silent-movie actor of the nineteen twenties.' However, he says the novel 'soon hurtles into absurdity.'
