= Carman Hall =

University dormitory in New York City

Coordinates: 40°48′24″N 73°57′51″W

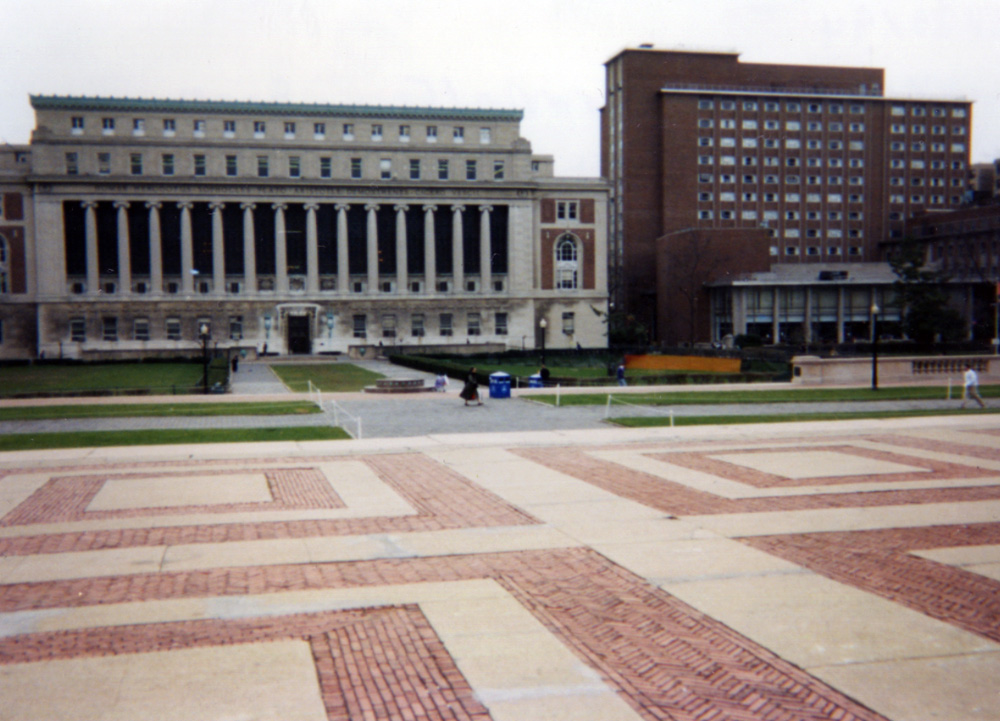
- Columbia University campus in 1994, with Carman Hall on the right side of the image, situated behind the now demolished Ferris Booth Hall.
- Interactive map of the Carman Hall area
- Former names: New Hall

General information
- Location: 545 West 114th Street, New York City, New York
- Named for: Harry J. Carman
- Opened: 1959
- Owner: Columbia University

Technical details
- Floor count: 13
- Floor area: 157,483 square feet

Design and construction
- Architect: Shreve, Lamb & Harmon

Carman Hall is a dormitory located on Columbia University's Morningside Heights campus and currently houses first-year students from Columbia College as well as the Fu Foundation School of Engineering and Applied Science.

== History ==
The building, originally named New Hall, broke ground in 1957 along with an adjacent student center called Ferris Booth Hall, which was later demolished to make way for Alfred Lerner Hall. The building was designed by Harvey Clarkson of Shreve, Lamb & Harmon, which designed the Empire State Building.

The building opened in 1959 to the all-male undergraduates of Columbia College. However, the aesthetics of the building along with other buildings constructed during Grayson L. Kirk's tenure was criticized by students, faculty, and critics alike, including Jacques Barzun, Andrew Dolkart, Barry Bergdoll, and Ada Louise Huxtable. Architecture critic Allan Temko noted that the building's long hallways and pattern of two double rooms with a shared bath resembled a “Victorian reformatory” and its lounge “a bus station with Muzak.” In 1962, Temko again criticized Carman as "dull and bureaucratic... [with] skimpy and unimaginative detail." Dean of the Yale School of Architecture Robert A. M. Stern, who graduated from Columbia a year after the building's completion, wrote in an unpublished piece that "[Carman and Ferris Booth Halls] are unfortunately mediocre in their conception."

After the building broke ground, an informal naming contest was organized by the Columbia Daily Spectator, with the "serious" category winner suggesting the building be named after dean Herbert Hawkes and the "humorous" category suggesting it to be named after Aaron Burr, as a counterpart to Hamilton Hall, at the opposite end of campus. However, neither name was endorsed by the university. As a placeholder, it was referred to as New Hall until it was finally named Carman Hall in 1965, in honor of Harry Carman, who served as dean of Columbia College from 1943 to 1950.

In November 2021, Carman Hall was evacuated after bomb threats surfaced on Twitter claiming that improvised explosives have been placed in the building.

== Notable residents ==
- George Stephanopoulos, chief anchor of ABC News
- Jonathan R. Cole, provost of Columbia University
- Art Garfunkel, musician
- Robert Kraft, billionaire businessman and philanthropist, owner of the New England Patriots
- Mike Massimino, astronaut
- Anna Paquin, actress
- David Denby, American film critic
- Stephen Donaldson, gay rights activist
- Eric Holder, 82nd United States Attorney General
- Chris Wiggins, chief data scientist at The New York Times
- Ezra Koenig, member of Vampire Weekend
- Eric Garcetti, mayor of Los Angeles
- Niles Eldredge, American paleontologist who proposed the theory of punctuated equilibrium
- Thomas de Zengotita, author and editor
- Robert Kolker, American author
- Olivier Knox, chief Washington correspondent for SiriusXM
- Christopher Dell, former United States Ambassador to Angola, Zimbabwe, Kosovo
- Rebekah Gee, former Secretary of the Louisiana Department of Health
- Ellen Gustafson, co-founder of FEED Projects
- Danielle Maged, American business executive with StubHub, Fox Networks Group, and Global Citizen
- Jonathan Lavine, co-managing partner of Bain Capital
- Harriet Ryan, Pulitzer Prize-winning journalist
- Tom Kitt, Pulitzer Prize-winning composer and musician
- Deborah Waxman, president of the Reconstructionist Rabbinical College
- Ed Harris, American actor
- Tim Kelly, mayor of Chattanooga, Tennessee
- Liesel Pritzker Simmons, American philanthropist and child actress and member of the Pritzker family
- Ruthzee Louijeune, at-large member of the Boston City Council
- Peter Mendelsund, graphic art designer, creative director of The Atlantic
- Robert S. Levine, scholar of English literature at the University of Maryland, College Park
- Brent Forrester, executive producer of Space Force, The Office, King of the Hill, writer of The Simpsons
- David S. Katz, historian at Brandeis University, formerly at Tel Aviv University, Israel
- Robert Dreyfuss, independent investigative journalist

== In popular culture ==
The building frequently served as the residence of the protagonist in Paul Auster's works, including 4 3 2 1 and Winter Journal; in the latter he describes Carman as "an austere environment, ugly and charmless, but nevertheless far better than the dungeonlike rooms to be found in the older dorms." A section of the Ben Coes novel, First Strike, was also set in the building. The building was also referenced in Christopher John Farley's young-adult novel, Zero O'Clock.

In his memoir, Photographs of My Father, Paul Spike notes that "not a trace of style ruins the ugly face of Carman Hall."
