= Leviathan (Auster novel) =

Novel by Paul Auster

- First edition
- Author: Paul Auster
- Language: English
- Genre: Crime novel
- Publisher: Viking Press
- Publication date: 1992
- Publication place: United States
- Media type: Print (Hardback)
- Pages: 275 pp
- ISBN: 0-14-017813-9
- OCLC: 29453311
- Preceded by: The Music of Chance
- Followed by: Mr. Vertigo

Leviathan is American writer Paul Auster’s seventh novel, published by Viking Press in 1992. The novel follows the circumstances leading to the disappearance and accidental death of a charismatic writer, as recounted by his estranged best friend.

== Plot introduction ==
The novel opens like a detective story as the narrator begins,

Six days ago, a man blew himself up by the side of a road in northern Wisconsin. There were no witnesses, but it appears that he was sitting on the grass next to his parked car when the bomb he was building accidentally went off. According to the forensic reports that have just been published, the man was killed instantly. His body burst into dozens of small pieces, and fragments of his corpse were found as far as fifty feet away from the site of the explosion. —Leviathan

Through his own investigations, the narrator attempts to answer questions as to who the man was who blew himself up, why he was found with a homemade bomb, and what circumstances brought him to a violent end.

== Plot summary ==
The story is told by Peter Aaron about the victim, Benjamin Sachs, his best friend whom he first meets as a fellow writer in a Greenwich Village bar in 1975. Peter decides to try to piece together the story of Ben's other life after agents from the F.B.I. approach him in the course of their investigation. Of their friendship, Peter acknowledges Ben's lost years of suffering and painful inner state, saying —

In 15 years, Sachs travelled from one end of himself to the other, and by the time he came to that last place, I doubt he even knew who he was anymore. So much distance had been covered by then, it wouldn't have been possible for him to remember where he had begun.

The two first meet as struggling novelists, Peter with the “wheeling” mind and the provocative Ben with his perfect marriage to the beautiful Fanny, a former classmate of Peter's whom he still harbours unrequited feelings for. Both have a wish to “say something”, to make a difference in the real world.

Although Ben's literary talent and charismatic personality earns the admiration of Peter, privately, Ben himself is full of doubts and his marriage is showing cracks. Over time, a complicated love triangle develops between Peter, Ben and Fanny, whilst Peter also becomes sexually involved with Maria Turner, an experimental photographer who follows strangers and constructs detailed stories about their lives.

At a party to celebrate the 100th anniversary of the Statue of Liberty, by freakish chance, Ben tumbles from a fourth-floor fire escape, nearly losing his life. The fall is both actual and metaphorical. For days afterward he refuses to speak and on recovery he is strangely remote. Within a week of turning 41, Ben expresses a desire to end the life he has lived until then. Feeling that his life has been a waste, he declares he wants everything to change, and serving himself with an all-or-nothing ultimatum, decides he must take control or fail. In evincing this change, he leaves Fanny, moves to a cabin in Vermont where he begins to work on a book – then vanishes.

His cabin and its contents are deserted, including his manuscript, titled Leviathan. There is no further contact with Fanny and one final meeting with Peter where he confesses all. Ben reveals that he was forced to kill a stranger in self defence during a random violent encounter on a remote road near his cabin. Upon discovering $165,000 in cash and a passport with the name Reed Dimaggio, he learns that the victim was the former husband of Maria's childhood friend, Lillian Stern. Wracked with guilt, Ben decides to travel to her home in Berkeley, California to give Lillian the money. Ben and Lillian eventually develop a romantic relationship, which ends in misery. Leaving $35,000 for Lillian, Ben uses the rest of the money to build a series of bombs targeting small-scale replicas of the Statue of Liberty across the nation, becoming a cult hero with the anonymous moniker "Phantom of Liberty".

Months after this final encounter, Peter reads about an accidental car bombing in Wisconsin, bringing the narrative back to the beginning. The novel ends with FBI investigators confirming Ben's identity as the Phantom of Liberty by matching fingerprints against a signed copy of one of Peter's books. Peter then ends his narration by handing the investigators "the pages of this book".

== Major themes ==
Austerian themes in the novel explore failure, identity, chance, coincidence and the evasive nature of truth. Maria, the character who follows strangers to photograph them is based on Sophie Calle, a French performance artist who recreated her own life by photographing actual people while creating fictions about them. Calle is acknowledged in the novel's introduction. Ben, the novel's central character meets Maria at the point where he begins to recreate his own life. The contrast is that while Calle/Maria parlayed her fictions into a career, Ben creates a life that finishes him.

Stylistically, Auster proves his themes through circuitous multi-layered writing, reporting conflicting personal accounts to inscribe subjective kinds of truth.

=== Explanation of the novel's title ===
"Leviathan" is borrowed from the biblical sea monster that Thomas Hobbes used as a metaphor for the State in his own book of that title. As the "Phantom of Liberty", blowing up replicas of the Statue of Liberty around the country – the novel's protagonist is a Hobbesian hero whose nemesis is the State; his self-inflicted death, a metaphor for man's doomed struggle.

Auster is known for placing his fictional characters in real-time contexts with real events as backdrop to his narratives. There are parallels with the "Unabomber," the academic urban terrorist, Theodore Kaczynski who was active for a similar length of time from the late 1970s to the mid-1990s.

== Characters ==
- Peter Aaron, novelist and narrator (titled after God's spokesman, the biblical Aaron)
- Benjamin Sachs, war protester, novelist, urban terrorist
- Fanny Sachs, Ben's wife
- Maria Turner, photographer
- Lillian Stern, ex-sex worker, Maria's best friend
- Maria Dimaggio, Lillian's little daughter
- Reed Dimaggio, Lillian's husband
- Agnes Darwin, party guest who causes Ben's accident

== Literary notes ==
Auster references themes of coincidence and chance that began with the hero of his 1985 novel, City of Glass who believed that “nothing was real except chance”.

== Adaptations ==
In 2009, Audible.com produced an audio version of Leviathan, narrated by Peter Ganim, as part of its Modern Vanguard line of audiobooks.

== Editions ==
- Leviathan, Paul Auster, Viking, New York, 1992.
- Leviathan, Paul Auster, Faber and Faber, London, 1993.

== See also ==
- Paul Auster
- Sophie Calle
- Thomas Hobbes
- Theodore Kaczynski
