= Jack Lohrke =

American baseball player (1924–2009)

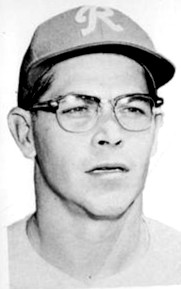
- Third baseman
- Born: February 25, 1924; Los Angeles, California, U.S.
- Died: April 29, 2009 (aged 85); San Jose, California, U.S.
- Batted: Right Threw: Right

MLB debut
- April 18, 1947, for the New York Giants

Last MLB appearance
- June 10, 1953, for the Philadelphia Phillies

MLB statistics
- Batting average: .242
- Home runs: 22
- Runs batted in: 96
- Stats at Baseball Reference

Teams
- New York Giants (1947–1951); Philadelphia Phillies (1952–1953)

Jack Wayne Lohrke (February 25, 1924 – April 29, 2009) was an American third baseman in Major League Baseball. During his playing career, he stood 6' (183 cm) tall, weighed 180 pounds (81.7 kg) and threw and batted right-handed.

== "Lucky Lohrke" ==
Lohrke earned the nickname "Lucky" not only because it sounded similar to his last name, but because he repeatedly escaped death by sheer good luck, in both war and peacetime.

As a US soldier in World War II, he survived a troop train crash that killed three and injured dozens more, as well as the Normandy landings, the Battle of the Bulge and extensive combat throughout Europe, including having the soldier next to him killed on four occasions.

Lohrke's good fortune continued when he returned from the war to the United States. Having to concede his plane seat to higher-ranked military personnel, he was bumped at the last moment from the passenger list of a military transport plane scheduled to fly from Camp Kilmer, New Jersey to his home in Los Angeles – the plane crashed, killing everyone on board.

After the war and following his transition back to civilian life, Lohrke resumed his baseball career. The summer of 1946 found him playing for the Class B Spokane Indians of the Western International League. On June 24, 1946, Lohrke was a passenger on the team bus carrying the team as it traveled toward Bremerton, Washington, to begin a road trip. At the time, Lohrke was the team's third baseman and was batting .345 in 229 at bats. His performance had earned him a promotion to the AAA Pacific Coast League's San Diego Padres but the team was unable to contact him as he was in transit between cities. The Indians’ business manager contacted the police along the route and asked that they relay the message to Lohrke, which they did when the team stopped for dinner. Lohrke, under orders to report immediately to the Padres, removed his gear from the bus, said goodbye to his teammates, and hitched rides back to Spokane. Later that evening, the team bus broke through a guard rail on a mountain pass, plunged down a hill, and crashed. Of the 15 players on it, nine were killed, including player/manager Mel Cole. The six survivors were badly injured.

== Major league career ==
Lohrke reached the major leagues the following year. He appeared in 354 games over seven seasons (1947–53) for the New York Giants and Philadelphia Phillies, primarily as a third baseman. He hit .242 in 914 at bats with 22 home runs.

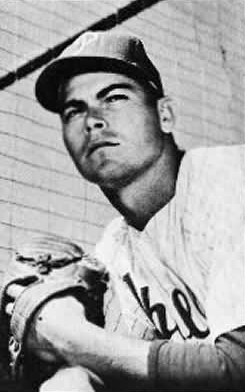
Jack Lohrke with the Philadelphia Phillies in 1956.

In 1947, Lohrke's rookie year in the majors, he met Honus Wagner prior to the start of a game the Giants played against the Pirates at Forbes Field. Jack hit 12 homers in his rookie season with New York. One of his homers broke the major league team homerun record (186 homeruns which had been set previously by the Yankees "Murderers' Row" club of Ruth and Gehrig.) The Giants ended up hitting 221 round trippers in 1947, a record that stood for many years. After Leo Durocher took over the helm of the Giants in 1948, Lohrke was relegated to a utility role as the fiery manager wanted to bring in his own players. Durocher sent Jack down to Jersey City in 1949, but Lohrke played so well that he was brought back up shortly thereafter.

Lucky Lohrke was moved to the mound from third base during spring training of 1950 as management tried to capitalize on his incredible arm, even though he never pitched for NY in a regular season game. (Jack later did pitch in relief roles upon his return to the Pacific Coast League in 1954.) In the famous "Shot Heard Round the World" game against the Dodgers on October 3, 1951, Lohrke was warming up and ready to come in to play infield if the game went extra innings, but Bobby Thomson crushed a fastball into the left field stands to dramatically end the game in the bottom of the ninth and send the New York club into the World Series with the Yanks.

Jack was traded to the Whiz Kids in Philadelphia prior to the start of the 1952 season where he played sparingly for two seasons until the Phils traded him to Pittsburgh. The Pirates moved Jack to their minor league affiliate, the Hollywood Stars of the PCL, and Jack spent his last five years of pro ball in the Coast League.

== Retirement and legacy ==
From the time he joined the Padres after the accident, Lohrke was called, for obvious reasons, "Lucky"-Lucky Lohrke, the ballplayer who got off the bus in the nick of time, the soldier bumped from the plane that crashed. The name stuck. Who else, after all, had more right to be called Lucky? He's in the Baseball Encyclopedia that way: Lucky Lohrke. An amiable man, he lived with the nickname, but he never liked it, never wanted to be reminded of how close he had come to riding that bus into oblivion. But what could he do about it?

In a 1994 interview with Sports Illustrated, Lohrke looked back on the tragic bus accident and said, "When you're the age I was back then, you haven't got a worry in the world. You're playing ball because you want to play-and they're giving you money to do it. And then...well, sometimes those names spring back at me. I'll tell you this: Nobody outside of baseball calls me Lucky Lohrke these days. I may have been lucky, but the name is Jack. Jack Lohrke."

After Lohrke left baseball, he worked for the Lockheed Corporation in California and eventually retired as the firm's head of security. Lohrke died at a hospital in San Jose, California, on April 29, 2009, at age 85, two days after suffering a stroke.

'Lucky Lohrke' is mentioned in Paul Auster's 2010 novel Sunset Park, and also in the first episode of the 2026 Netflix show Run Away.

== Bibliography ==
- Spink, J. G. Taylor, ed., The 1952 Baseball Register. St. Louis: The Sporting News, 1952.
