= Kitty Wu =

Danish alternative rock band

Kitty Wu is a Danish alternative rock band founded in 1998 in Copenhagen. The band takes its name from a character in Paul Auster's novel Moon Palace.

The band was formed by Robert Lund, Allan Schøneberg, Claus Bergmann, and Samuel Helles. Helles left the band in 2007, and today Kitty Wu performs as a trio with Bergmann on drums, Schøneberg on bass, and Lund on vocals, guitar, and keyboard.

== History ==
Kitty Wu's debut album, Privacy, was released in 2001. That same year, the band was picked to play the main stage at Roskilde Festival. Their second album, The Rules of Transportation was released in 2003 and again followed by a performance at Roskilde Festival, this time accompanied by Rob Ellis as a second drummer and keyboard player. In 2005, the band's third album Knives and Daggers was released. It, and the albums which followed were influenced by the band's relationship with other artists, including Guy Fixsen and the band's mentor Rob Ellis.

In 2009, Kitty Wu released their fourth album Someone Was Here, the group's first album following the departure of bassist Samuel Helles. Their 5th album, Carrier Pigeons, was released in 2012. The album was mixed by John O’mahony in Jimi Hendrix’ Electric Lady Studios in New York's West Village.

Kitty Wu has toured as headliner, as well as having supported, among others, Muse (Scandinavian tour), Kashmir (Danish Tour), Sort Sol (Danish Tour) and Brendan Benson (German tour). Their music has also been used by the Danish TVs and later feature film, 100% Greve.

== Discography ==
=== Albums ===
- Privacy, 2001 (MNW) feat. Kasper Eistrup
- The Rules of Transportation, 2003 (Universal/Mercury) feat. Rob Ellis and Natasha Lea Jones
- Knives and Daggers, 2005 (Alarm Music/Fast Getaway) feat. Rob Ellis
- Someone Was Here, 2009 (Alarm Music/Fast Getaway)
- Carrier Pigeons, 2012 (Alarm Music/Fast Getaway)

=== Singles ===
- "I'm not going fast", 2001 (MNW)
- "Eva Braun", 2001 (MNW)
- "Stay Indoors", 2001 (MNW)
- "Arms Raised", 2003 (Universal/Mercury)
- "This Building Is On Fire", 2003 (Universal/Mercury)
- "Those Who Got Away With It", 2003 (Universal/Mercury)
- "Sleep Together, Wake Apart", 2005 (Alarm/Fast Getaway)
- "Spending Black Time With You", 2006 (Alarm/Fast Getaway)
- "Beggars And Chooser", 2007 (Alarm/Fast Getaway)
- "Love Letters", 2009 (Alarm/Fast Getaway)
- "Threetwentyone", 2010 (Alarm/Fast Getaway)
- "Gold Chain", 2010 (Alarm/Fast Getaway)
- "Act Surprised", 2011 (Alarm/Fast Getaway)
- "We Go Places", 2012 (Alarm/Fast Getaway)

=== Compilations ===
- Det Elektriske Barometer 01, 2001 (DR)
- Music From Denmark, 2002 (MXR)
- Hanging By A Moment, 2002 (Universal)
- The Album, 2003 (Universal)
