= Report from the Interior =

Book by Paul Auster

- First edition (US)
- Author: Paul Auster
- Language: English
- Genre: Memoir
- Publisher: Henry Holt and Co. (US); Faber & Faber (UK)
- Publication date: November 19, 2013
- Publication place: United States
- ISBN: 9780805098570

Report from the Interior is an autobiographical work by Paul Auster published in 2013. It is a companion volume to Auster's Winter Journal (2012), and so was the second book of memoirs Auster published in back-to-back years. Kirkus Reviews included it on their year end list of Best Nonfiction Book of 2013.

== Contents ==
Auster arranges the book into the following four sections:

1. Report from the Interior
2. Two Blows to the Head
3. Time Capsule
4. Album (Photos)

== See also ==
- The Invention of Solitude, Auster's first memoirs, published in 1982
- Postmodernism
