= In the Country of Last Things =

1987 novel written by Paul Auster

- First US edition
- Author: Paul Auster
- Language: English
- Genre: Dystopian
- Publisher: Viking Press (US); Faber & Faber (UK)
- Publication date: 1987
- Publication place: United States
- Media type: Print (hardback)
- Pages: 188 pp
- ISBN: 0-670-81445-8
- OCLC: 58411637
- Preceded by: The New York Trilogy
- Followed by: Moon Palace

In the Country of Last Things is a dystopian epistolary novel written by American author Paul Auster, first published in 1987.

== Plot summary ==
The novel takes the form of a letter from a young woman named Anna Blume. Anna has ventured into an unnamed city that has collapsed into chaos and disorder. In this environment, no industry takes place and most of the population collects garbage or scavenges for objects to resell. Anna has entered the city to search for her brother William, a journalist, and it is suggested that the Blumes come from a world to the East which has not collapsed.

Anna arrives in the city with William's address, and an address and photo for Samuel Farr, whom William's editor sent to the city after failing to receive word from William. However, in a turn of events she later understands to be typical of life in the city, she finds that not only has William's house been demolished, but the entire street where he lived has been reduced to rubble. Anna lives on the streets of the city as an 'object hunter', a job which involves scavenging for specific objects rather than collecting general waste.

One day, Anna saves the life of Isabel, an older woman. Isabel is, like Anna, an object hunter, despite her advanced age, and has an uncanny knowledge of where and when to find the objects they require. She lives with her husband, Ferdinand, a rude man who does not work, but makes ships in bottles from small waste materials he finds. Ferdinand tries to rape Anna, but she, trying to scare him away, starts to strangle him and gives up before he dies, while Isabel is supposedly asleep. Anna and Isabel discover that Ferdinand had died in the morning, hinting that Isabel had finished the job later that evening. Isabel and Anna, not wanting to simply leave his body in the street or carry it to a crematorium, throw it from the roof of their apartment building, making it seem as if Ferdinand had committed suicide. Soon after, Isabel becomes ill, and can no longer work. She dies, and after Anna has taken her body to be cremated, housebreakers arrive at her apartment and overpower her, making her homeless once again.

After having been homeless for a period, Anna is forced to run from a police officer, and goes through the first open door she sees, which turns out to be the city's national library. Parts of the library have been allocated by the government for academics and religious groups. She meets a rabbi, leading a small group of Jewish inhabitants of the city. Anna reveals that she too is a Jew, but no longer believes in God (see Jewish atheism). The group cannot help Anna on her mission to find William, but one of the rabbi's accomplices directs her to Samuel Farr, who it transpires is also living in the library.

Despite initial hostility, Sam accepts Anna into his life, and the two live together and become lovers. Sam is working on a book about the city, but is swiftly running out of money. Anna remedies the couple's financial situation with the money she has obtained from selling Isabel and Ferdinand's possessions, and the two are able to live in relative comfort and afford luxury items such as cigarettes. This period is described as one of Anna's happiest. However, the Jewish groups are forced to leave the library when the government decides to exert its authority, and are replaced by a man named Dujardin, of whom Anna is suspicious.

Anna's shoes start to wear out, and Sam refuses to let Anna leave their apartment until he has procured a new pair, especially because Anna is now pregnant. This takes time, however, and Anna is tempted by an offer from Dujardin to buy her a pair from his cousin, and, despite her initial dislike of him, she accepts his offer. She follows him to his cousin's house, but realizes she has been tricked, and that the house is a human slaughterhouse. Anna jumps from a window and escapes, and is taken in by the patrons of Woburn House, a homeless shelter. When she awakes, she lives in luxury, but is deeply distressed to hear that a fire has broken out at the library, Sam's whereabouts are unknown, and she has had a miscarriage. Anna takes a position at Woburn House, and becomes close to her colleagues; Victoria, the daughter of the House's founder, Dr. Woburn; Frick, an older man who serves as a driver and has a strange way of speaking; Willie, Frick's introverted fifteen-year-old grandson; and Boris Stepanovich, an enigmatic character responsible for procuring food and supplies for the House.

Anna enters a love affair with Victoria, which helps her recover from losing Sam. She is appointed to a position in which she interviews prospective residents of the House, which she finds emotionally draining. She vents her anger on an interviewee, then falls asleep, and awakes to find Sam sitting opposite her. He has lived in an abandoned railway station since the fire in the library, and has become almost unrecognizable. He is taken in immediately, though, and begins to make progress. When he returns to full health, Victoria asks him to contribute to the House by pretending to be a doctor: there is no longer any medical equipment except for painkillers and bandages, so the charade is unlikely to be uncovered, and people enjoy telling him their stories. However, Boris tells Anna that Woburn House is financially unsustainable, as it relies on a finite supply of items taken from Dr. Woburn's collection. She comes to realize that the House cannot continue forever, and cutbacks are made to the provisions granted to residents.

Frick dies, and is given a burial in the House's garden, against the city's laws. However, the burial is reported to the police by an unknown resident, and they arrive to dig up the body. The police are dissuaded by Boris Stepanovich from taking further measures, but Willie has been deeply affected by the events. He starts to act erratically, and eventually violently, taking a gun and murdering several residents of the House, before turning on Victoria, Sam and Anna. Sam shoots him before he can reach them, but too much damage has been done to the House and its reputation for it to continue.

The House closes down and, with the last of their money (taken from selling the remnants of the Woburn collection and Boris's personal wealth), the four obtain travel permits. The novel ends with Anna considering the best way for them to leave the city, and telling the unknown acquaintance to whom she is writing that she will write again. It is unknown whether the letter was sent, and whether Anna, Victoria, Sam and Boris were successful in their attempt to leave the city.

The 'last things' in the title of the book refers not only to the disappearance of manufactured objects and technology but also the fading of memories of them and the words used to describe them.

== Film adaptation ==
A film adaptation directed by Alejandro Chomski was filmed in the Dominican Republic, and premiered on November 27 of 2020. The film has been picked up for release by Mbur Indie Film Distribution for Worldwide release
