= The Brooklyn Follies =

Novel by Paul Auster

- First edition (UK)
- Author: Paul Auster
- Language: English
- Publisher: Henry Holt and Co. (US); Faber & Faber
- Publication date: November 17, 2005 (UK); December 27, 2005 (US)
- Publication place: United States
- Media type: Print (hardback)
- Pages: 320 pages
- ISBN: 0-8050-7714-6
- OCLC: 57475869
- Dewey Decimal: 813/.54 22
- LC Class: PS3551.U77 B76 2006
- Preceded by: Oracle Night
- Followed by: Travels in the Scriptorium

The Brooklyn Follies is a 2005 novel by Paul Auster.

== Plot summary ==
59-year-old Nathan Glass returns to Park Slope in Brooklyn, New York after his wife has left him. He is recovering from lung cancer and is looking for "a quiet place to die". In Brooklyn, he meets his nephew, Tom, whom he has not seen in several years. Tom has seemingly given up on life and has resigned himself to a string of meaningless jobs as he waits for his life to change. They develop a close friendship, entertaining each other in their misery, as they both try to avoid taking part in life.

When Lucy, Tom's young niece who initially refuses to speak, comes into their lives, there is suddenly a bridge between their past and their future that offers both Tom and Nathan some form of redemption.

The Brooklyn Follies contains the classic elements of a Paul Auster novel. The main character is a lonely man, who has suffered an unfortunate reversal. The narrative is based on sudden and randomly happening events and coincidences. "It is a book about survival" as Paul Auster says.

The novel was published in Danish in May 2005, under the name Brooklyn Dårskab. It was published in English in November 2005. The Traditional Chinese version appeared in October 2006 with the title slightly altered as Mr. Nathan in Brooklyn.
