= Austerians =

Austerians may refer to:

- Fiscal conservatism, a term used in economy - originally in North America - to describe a fiscal policy that advocates avoiding deficit spending (and advocates for austerity programmes as well),
- Followers of Paul Auster, an American author
