= The Music of Chance (film) =

1993 film

- Film poster
- Directed by: Philip Haas
- Screenplay by: Paul Auster; Belinda Haas; Philip Haas
- Based on: The Music of Chance by Paul Auster
- Produced by: Paul Colichman; Topher Dunne
- Starring: James Spader; Mandy Patinkin; M. Emmet Walsh; Charles Durning; Joel Grey; Samantha Mathis; Chris Penn
- Cinematography: Bernard Zitzermann
- Edited by: Belinda Haas
- Music by: Phillip Johnston
- Production company: Trans Atlantic Entertainment
- Distributed by: IRS Media
- Release date: March 20, 1993
- Running time: 98 minutes
- Country: United States
- Language: English

The Music of Chance is a 1993 American drama film directed by Philip Haas. It was screened in the Un Certain Regard section at the 1993 Cannes Film Festival. It is based on the 1990 book of the same name by Paul Auster.

== Plot ==
Jim Nashe worked as a fireman, but a large inheritance and a divorce from his wife has left him free to buy a new car and see the country at his leisure.

He picks up a hitchhiker, Jack Pozzi, who turns out to be a professional gambler. Pozzi tells how he just lost his net worth when the poker game he was playing at was robbed and he was beaten after the others suspected him of orchestrating the robbery. Now he cannot afford the minimum $10,000 buy-in to play a poker game with a pair of eccentric old millionaires whom he had previously beaten handily. With money and time to spare, the intrigued Nashe offers to back Pozzi with $10,000 for a rematch.

The wealthy men, Flower and Stone, live together on a huge estate. They willingly agree to another game, but are not the suckers Pozzi takes them for. After losing at first, they repeatedly win, exhausting the $10,000. Nashe puts up his car for more chips, though he has to agree to $5,000, much less than he says the car is worth. Pozzi loses again. Now Nashe, who needs the car to get home proposes a new bet: a single cut of the cards. If he wins, he gets the car back; if he loses, he owes $10,000. Nashe loses.

As Flower and Stone do not trust Pozzi and Nashe to repay the debt, the only option is for them to work it off. Flower and Stone have a pile of 10,000 large stones, said to be from a 15th-century castle. They would like to build a wall on their property, so they tell Nashe and Pozzi that if they devote the next 50 days to erecting the wall, their debt will be paid.

A foreman named Calvin Murks keeps an eye on the two men. Nashe methodically goes about his task, but Pozzi becomes increasingly down-spirited, feeling like a slave. One day while working on the wall Pozzi takes offense at a snide remark by Murks and assaults him, thereafter Murks begins coming to work armed.

After learning that the cost of their food is being added to their debt and that Flower and Stone have gone on an overseas trip, Pozzi decides he needs to escape. He asks Nashe to join him but the more easy going Nashe wants to see the project through. Pozzi attempts his escape by burrowing under the fence and disappearing, offering to call Nashe's family when he gets away. However, the next morning, Nashe wakes to find a badly beaten and unconscious Pozzi outside the front door of his shack. Murks appears and seemingly takes him to hospital. Later, Murks says that Pozzi recovered and left, but Nashe doesn't believe the old man.

Murks takes Nashe out for drinks with his son-in-law Floyd. Floyd plays a competitive game of Pool with Nashe for money and Nashe wins $50. The seemingly generous Nashe tells Floyd to spend the $50 on his son and Floyd tells Nashe he owes him a favour. Nashe asks if he can drive Murks' new car (his car from earlier in the film) back to the house when they leave and Floyd agrees to ask Murks for Nashe. As they drive back Nashe calmly starts to accelerate, Murks grows alarmed and calls Nashe a fool as a motorbike's lights approach. Nashe veers off the road crashing the car and killing both Floyd and Murks. The injured Nashe is next seen strolling up the road whereupon a driver (author Paul Auster, in a cameo role) pulls over and offers him a lift. Nashe is last heard saying that he is going to Minnesota and asking if he can be taken to a payphone.

== Cast ==
- James Spader as Jack Pozzi
- Mandy Patinkin as Jim Nashe
- M. Emmet Walsh as Calvin Murks
- Charles Durning as Bill Flower
- Joel Grey as Willy Stone
- Samantha Mathis as Tiffany
- Chris Penn as Floyd
- Pearl Jones as Louise
- Jordan Spainhour as Floyd Jr.
- Paul Auster as Driver

== Critical reception ==
The New York Times, “Cryptic, elegantly made.”
