= True Tales of American Life =

- Editor: Paul Auster
- Author: Americans
- Language: English
- Subject: Society of the United States
- Publisher: Henry Holt and Company & Faber and Faber
- English publication date: 2001 & 2002

True Tales of American Life is a short story anthology edited and introduced by the distinguished American author Paul Auster, published in 2001 (in the USA under the title I Thought My Father Was God). The book originated from The National Story Project, a radio project launched in 1999 as part of the public radio show Weekend All Things Considered on NPR. Auster invited listeners to send in true stories from their lives, ultimately collecting over 4,000 submissions from people of all walks of life.

Out of this massive volume of material, the editor selected 180 stories that outline a multidimensional and authentic picture of 20th-century American society. The requirement for selection was that each of the stories had to be true, and each of the writers must not have been previously published. These texts, distinguished by their brevity and immediacy, combine coincidence with the unexpected, proving that real life can often surpass the imagination of literature.

Paul Auster divided the stories into ten thematic sections: Animals, Objects, Families, Slapstick, Strangers, War, Love, Death, Dreams, and Meditations.
