= Here and Now: Letters, 2008–2011 =

Collection of letters by Paul Auster and J. M. Coetzee

Here and Now: Letters (2008-2011)
- US first edition cover
- Author: Paul Auster, J. M. Coetzee
- Language: English
- Publisher: Viking Press
- Publication date: March 2013
- Publication place: United States, United Kingdom
- ISBN: 9780670026661

Here and Now: Letters (2008–2011) is the published collection of letters between the authors Paul Auster and J. M. Coetzee.
