= Sunset Park (novel) =

Novel by Paul Auster

- First edition
- Author: Paul Auster
- Language: English
- Publisher: Henry Holt and Co.
- Publication date: November 9, 2010
- Publication place: United States
- Media type: Print (Hardback)
- Pages: 320 pp (hardback edition)
- ISBN: 978-0-8050-9286-8
- Preceded by: Invisible
- Followed by: 4 3 2 1

Sunset Park is a novel by Paul Auster published in November 2010.

== Plot summary ==
Set during the American financial recession in 2008, the college dropout Miles Heller, who has been running from his past for seven years, is forced to leave his new girlfriend in Florida and return home to New York City. There he unites with his old friend Bing who lives with two women in an abandoned home in the Sunset Park neighborhood in Brooklyn.

Through several situations of coincidence and self-discovery, it is a story about how to reconnect with a world once left behind, and how to rejoin the human race after self-inflicted exile.

== Reception ==
The novel was well-regarded upon publication. In The New York Times Book Review, novelist Malena Watrous wrote, "[Auster is] right that the rules of fiction should be bent. Writers not always determined to please the reader are the ones who break new ground. Auster’s renegade impulse has set him apart, earning him devoted fans. He has also been taken to task for following his own formula too often. In 'Sunset Park,' he deviates from it by telling a fairly linear story, although there are still lengthy passages in which he interrupts the narrative by pasting in baseball trivia, a treatise on behalf of the Chinese dissident Liu Xiaobo and quotations from the classic movie 'The Best Years of Our Lives.' Yet if Auster can’t escape his own fixations — if his characters still mourn the passing moment even as they live in it, still yearn to hold on to the present even as it slips away — maybe that’s because this nostalgia is one universal human desire, made manifest in every photograph and every novel and every effort to leave a mark."
