= Winter Journal =

Book by Paul Auster

- First edition (US)
- Author: Paul Auster
- Language: English
- Genre: Memoir
- Publisher: Henry Holt and Co. (US); Faber & Faber (UK)
- Publication date: August 21, 2012
- Publication place: United States
- Media type: Print (Hardcover)
- Pages: 230
- ISBN: 9780805095531
- OCLC: 756837025

Winter Journal is a memoir by Paul Auster published in 2012. It is an autobiographical companion volume to Auster's memoir Report from the Interior (2013), which appeared the following year.
