= The New York Trilogy =

Novel by Paul Auster

- First edition
- Author: Paul Auster
- Language: English
- Genre: Mystery novel Postmodern fiction
- Publisher: Faber & Faber
- Publication date: 1987 (hbk); 1988 (pbk)
- Publication place: United States
- Media type: Print (hardback & paperback)
- Pages: 478 pp. (hbk); 314 pp. (pbk)
- ISBN: 9780571149254 (hbk); ISBN 9780571152230
- OCLC: 16683990
- Preceded by: The Invention of Solitude
- Followed by: In the Country of Last Things

The New York Trilogy is a series of novels by American writer Paul Auster. Originally published sequentially as City of Glass (1985), Ghosts (1986) and The Locked Room (1986), it has since been collected into a single volume. The Trilogy is a postmodern interpretation of detective and mystery fiction, exploring various philosophical themes.

== Background ==
The first story, City of Glass, was inspired by an actual phone call Paul Auster received from someone who had called the wrong number and wanted to speak to the Pinkerton detective agency. While using elements of the detective story, the trilogy is a philosophical work based on linguistic and existential studies Auster had been working on for many years. The second book, Ghosts, was in part a reworking of an earlier play Auster had written called Blackouts. Auster described the three novels as different dimensions of the same story and also a kind of "shadow autobiography", imagining the protagonist Quinn and the fictional Paul Auster as an alternative life he could have had.

== Plot ==
=== City of Glass ===
The first story, City of Glass, features an author of detective fiction who becomes a private investigator and descends into madness as he becomes embroiled in the investigation of a case. It explores layers of identity and reality, from Paul Auster the writer of the novel to the unnamed "author" who reports the events as reality, to "Paul Auster the writer", a character in the story, to "Paul Auster the detective", who may or may not exist in the novel, to Peter Stillman the younger, to Peter Stillman the elder and, finally, to Daniel Quinn, the protagonist.

City of Glass has an intertextual relationship with Miguel de Cervantes' Don Quixote. Not only does the protagonist Daniel Quinn share his initials with the knight, but when Quinn finds "Paul Auster the writer," Auster is in the midst of writing an article about the authorship of Don Quixote. Auster calls his article an "imaginative reading," and in it he examines possible identities of Cide Hamete Benengeli, the narrator of the Quixote.

=== Ghosts ===
The second story, Ghosts, is about a private eye called Blue, trained by Brown, who is investigating a man named Black on Orange Street for a client named White. Blue writes written reports to White who in turn pays him for his work. Blue becomes frustrated and loses himself as he becomes immersed in the life of Black.

=== The Locked Room ===
The Locked Room is the story of a writer who lacks the creativity to produce fiction. Fanshawe, his childhood friend, has produced creative work, and when he disappears the writer publishes his work and replaces him in his family. "Paul Auster", the name, does not appear in this story as it does in City of Glass, but Auster breaks the fourth wall by writing about writing of the previous books in the trilogy "...I could not have started this book. The same holds for the two books that come before it, City of Glass and Ghosts." He also references clearly autobiographical moments such as his encounter with composer Wyschnegradsky when Auster was a young man in Paris. The title is a reference to a "locked-room mystery", a popular form of early detective fiction.

== Adaptations ==
City of Glass was adapted in 1994 into a critically acclaimed experimental graphic novel by Paul Karasik and David Mazzucchelli. It was published as City of Glass: A Graphic Mystery in 2004. In 2025 it was collected as the first part of The New York Trilogy along with new adaptations of Ghosts (by Karasik and Lorenzo Mattotti) and The Locked Room (by Karasik solo).

In March 2006, it was published as text with illustrations by Art Spiegelman and an introduction by Lucy Sante - ISBN 9780143039839.

In 2009, Audible produced an audio version of The New York Trilogy, narrated by Joe Barrett, as part of its Modern Vanguard line of audiobooks.

In 2016, Edward Einhorn adapted City of Glass as a play Off-Broadway, at the New Ohio.

In 2017, Duncan Macmillan produced another adaptation as a play, which showed for a short period at HOME in Manchester, before transferring to the Lyric, Hammersmith. It was a co-production between HOME, the Lyric, and 59 Productions.

== Bibliography ==
=== Editions ===
- Auster, Paul The New York Trilogy. (London: Faber and Faber, 1987) ISBN 9780571152230.

A 2006 reissue by Penguin Books is fronted by new pulp magazine-style covers by comic book illustrator Art Spiegelman.

=== Criticism ===
Books

- Barone, Dennis (ed.) Beyond the Red Notebook (Pennsylvania: University of Pennsylvania Press, 1995) ISBN 0812215567 (paperback). Two essays on City of Glass and The Locked Room, respectively.
- Bloom, Harold (ed.) Bloom's Modern Critical Views: Paul Auster (Broomall, PA: Chelsea House Publisher, 2004) ISBN 0791076628. Several essays on The New York Trilogy.
- Martin, Brendan Paul Auster's Postmodernity (Oxford: Routledge, 2008) ISBN 041596203X (hardback).
- Nicol, Bran The Cambridge Introduction to Postmodern Fiction (Cambridge: Cambridge University Press, 2009) ISBN 9780521679572. Chapter 7, 'Two postmodern genres: cyberpunk and detective fiction', includes a section on City of Glass.
