= Timbuktu (novella) =

Novel by Paul Auster

- First edition
- Author: Paul Auster
- Language: English
- Publisher: Henry Holt
- Publication date: May 1999
- Publication place: United States
- Media type: Print (Hardback & Paperback)
- Pages: 181
- ISBN: 0-8050-5407-3
- OCLC: 62177629

Timbuktu is a 1999 novella by Paul Auster. It is about the life of a dog, Mr. Bones, who is struggling to come to terms with the fact that his homeless master is dying.

The story, set in the early 1990s, is told through the eyes of Mr Bones, who, although not anthropomorphised, has an internal monologue in English. The story centres on his last journey with his ailing master, Willy G Christmas, to Baltimore, who hopes to find his former English teacher. Much of the details of both of their early lives are told in flashback.

The title of the book comes from the concept of the afterlife as proposed by Christmas, a self-titled poet, who believed it was a beautiful place called Timbuktu. A major running theme in the book is Mr Bones' worry that dogs will not go to Timbuktu, and he won't see Willy again after death.

The novella also draws on themes of existentialism, finding purpose in one's life, and a meditation on late 20th century America. It has now been made into a play by Croatian director Borut Separovic.

The novella is referenced by Fionn Regan in the song "Put a Penny in the Slot" from the album The End of History.

== Adaptations ==
In 2009, Audible.com produced an audio version of Timbuktu, narrated by Joe Barrett, as part of its Modern Vanguard line of audiobooks.
