= Mr. Vertigo =

Novel by Paul Auster

- First UK edition
- Author: Paul Auster
- Language: English
- Genre: Absurdist fiction
- Publication date: Feb 1994 Faber (UK); July 1994 Viking Press (US)
- Publication place: United States
- Media type: Print (Hardback & Paperback)
- Pages: 256 (hardback edition)
- ISBN: 0-571-17092-7 (hardback edition)
- OCLC: 29668740

Mr. Vertigo is a novel written by the American author Paul Auster. Faber & Faber first published it in 1994 in Great Britain. The book fits well in Auster's bibliography, which has reappearing themes like failure and identity and genres like absurdist fiction, crime fiction and existentialism.

Mr. Vertigo tells the story of Walter Claireborne Rawley, in short Walt. He is a neglected orphan dwelling on the streets of St. Louis. Master Yehudi takes the boy to a lone house in the countryside to teach Walt how to fly. Throughout the story, they encounter real-life dangers like the Ku Klux Klan and the Chicago Mob.

== Plot ==
=== Part I ===
Walt Rawley lives with his uncle and aunt in St. Louis. They treat him badly, he is forced to be outside during the daytime and he receives little to no education. Walt is a beggar without prospects. This changes when he meets Master Yehudi. He tells the boy: "You're no better than an animal. If you stay where you are, you'll be dead before winter is out. If you come with me, I'll teach you how to fly" (page 3). Walt accepts the offer, and starts the terrific journey to the art of loft and levitation. Walt has other difficulties apart from gaining the skill to fly. Walt is a racist and is shocked when he meets his new housemates: the Ethiopian boy Aesop, the Indian Mother Sioux and the Jewish Master Yehudi. He eventually accepts this diversity and focuses on the thirty-three steps towards the skill of loft and levitation. After many humiliating tasks including living burial, cutting of a finger joint and being struck by lightning, he experiences levitation for the first time. When Walt tries to do a somersault above the lake near the house, a dramatic event happens: The Ku Klux Klan kill Aesop and Mother Sioux and set the house on fire.

=== Part II ===
Master Yehudi and Walt, whose aversion against the victims had changed to love, are emotional wrecks. They bury the dead and go to live with Mrs Witherspoon, a good friend of Master Yehudi. Master Yehudi's grief continues for months and he stays distant from Walt and Mrs Witherspoon. The latter two are forced to spend time with each other and therefore they become fond of each other. Master Yehudi is suddenly relieved of his grief and life continues again. Master Yehudi plans performances starting in little country festivals. Walt's first public performance turns out horrible because of the drunken public. They do not give up, but alter the performance with Walt's ideas. The stages get bigger and bigger. When everything seems to be perfect, Uncle Slim kidnaps Walt. He claims a big part of the profit Walt has made, because of the deal Slim and Yehudi have made. After Walt has been kidnapped for a while, he manages to escape and return to Master Yehudi. Walt the Wonder Boy makes a big comeback, and he has all the success and fame he could want. However, after a show in New Haven, Walt suffers terrible headaches after levitating. He and Master Yehudi decide to stop this career, because this has happened to other levitators in the past. Walt will become a movie actor in Hollywood. On the way towards Hollywood, they are attacked by Uncle Slim and he robs them of all their money, leaving Master Yehudi fatally injured. Yehudi shoots himself through his head, allowing Walt to move on.

=== Part III ===
Walt sought for revenge on his uncle for killing Master Yehudi. In the three-year search for Uncle Slim, Walt turns into his old, city dwelling self again. He finds Slim working for drugs smugglers in Chicago. After Walt kills his uncle by poisoning him, Slim's boss (Bingo) appears and offers Walt a job, which he accepts. Walt climbs up the criminal ladder and eventually opens his own nightclub named Mr Vertigo. At the top of his success, Walt unexpectedly meets Mrs Witherspoon again in a hotel. She offers to get him out of the criminal circuit, but he does not see the necessity. Walt starts to lose his mind and ends up threatening the professional baseball player Dizzy Dean. Walt has to go to boot camp.

=== Part IV ===
Walt stayed in boot camp until 1945, because his eyes were too weak for flight school. He starts dwelling the city again and has several small jobs in three years. When he eventually gets a job at a baking company, Walt meets Molly Fitzsimmons. They marry, but are not able to have children. Molly dies of cancer after twenty-three years of marriage. Walt becomes an alcoholic, but Molly's family helps him get sober and finds him a job. On his way to the city where he will work, Walt decides to visit the village he lived in the times of levitation. He knocks on Mrs Witherspoon's door and is surprised to see her still living there. She has her own Laundromats and invites Walt to work for her. He accepts, and from then on Mrs Witherspoon and Walt live together like husband and wife. After she dies, Walt decides to write a book about his life.

== Characters ==
=== Walter Claireborne Rawley ===
Walt is the protagonist and narrator of the story. His life is followed from teenager to elderly and the story shows his changing personality. As a young boy, Walt is an uneducated, rebellious racist who either does not have or show his emotions. It gradually changes after he starts living with Master Yehudi. Walt learns to have respect for opinions and nationalities other than his own. Aesop teaches him how to read and Walt becomes eager to learn. When he is at the top of his success, Walt becomes very proud. Walt becomes his own self again after Master Yehudi's death: he starts dwelling the streets and his old dialect returns. In his elderly days, he becomes very caring for Molly and Mrs Witherspoon.

=== Master Yehudi ===
The Hungarian Jew Master Yehudi came to America when he was a young boy. Yehudi spends much of his time reading Spinoza. He has a many-sided personality. On one side, Master Yehudi is a business man with interest in nothing but profit numbers, shown by the plans he makes for Walt and Aesop. On the other side, he is a strict fatherly figure, hiding his care. However, when Walts gets ill, Yehudi does show his emotions and regret.

=== Aesop ===
The crippled Ethiopian boy Aesop was rescued by Master Yehudi and received a high quality education. Aesop is therefore very knowledgeable, rare for black people at the time. Aesop takes it upon himself to teach Walt about history and make him literate.

=== Mother Sioux ===
The Indian Mother Sioux is the mother figure of the household. Her grandfather was the brother of Sitting Bull and she was a rider in Buffalo Bill's Wild West Show. When she was a young woman, she was treated badly. Master Yehudi decided to help her and since that moment, Mother Sioux lives with him. She is loving and caring for everyone.

=== Uncle Slim ===
Uncle Slim is the antagonist of the story. He has treated Walt very badly and gave him no attention. When Walt is at the top of his success, Slim kidnaps Walt. He has planned this carefully. Later on, he attacks Yehudi and Walt. Also this has been prepared thoroughly. Slim gets into the criminal drugs circuit.

== Themes and historical context ==
=== Racism ===
Many Americans in the 1920s were unhappy about the immigration from Eastern Europe. A group called White Anglo-Saxon Protestant tried to reduce the number of immigrants to the US and the Ku Klux Klan tried to get rid of people who they considered to be a threat to the USA. The latter is responsible for a switching point in the novel, as the Ku Klux Klan kills Aesop and Mother Sioux and puts the house on fire.

Also Walt is full of racism before he meets Master Yehudi. He does not want to live with a Jew, a negro and an Indian.

=== Education ===
Master Yehudi chooses Walt to learn the skill of levitation because of his poor education. Walt has no clue about the world, and because of his ignorance he has the best chances of success. The other boy Yehudi has taken into his house, Aesop, is totally different from Walt. Master Yehudi wanted to make Aesop an intelligent boy and therefore gave him the best education and taught him how to read. Eventually, Aesop teaches Walt how to read.

== Adaptations ==
In 2009, Audible.com produced an audio version of Mr. Vertigo, narrated by Kevin Pariseau, as part of its Modern Vanguard line of audiobooks.

In 2011, it was announced that Terry Gilliam was working on a film adaptation of the book. In June 2018, Gilliam announced at the Brussels International Film Festival that he was working again on Mr. Vertigo, and that it might be his next film, and that he had Ralph Fiennes attached to star in it.
