= The Music of Chance =

Novel by Paul Auster

- First edition
- Author: Paul Auster
- Language: English
- Genre: Mystery novel
- Publisher: Viking Press
- Publication date: 1990
- Publication place: United States
- Media type: Print (hardcover)
- ISBN: 0-670-83535-8
- OCLC: 21229180
- Dewey Decimal: 813/.54 20
- LC Class: PS3551.U77 M87 1990

The Music of Chance (1990) is an absurdist novel by Paul Auster. It was a 1991 finalist for the PEN/Faulkner Award for Fiction and was later made into a film in 1993; Mandy Patinkin played Nashe and James Spader played Pozzi.

== Plot summary ==
Jim Nashe is a fireman whose wife has left him; unable to work and raise their young daughter, Juliet, at the same time, he sends her to live with his sister. The father who abandoned Nashe as a child then dies, leaving his children a large amount of money. Nashe pays off his debts, buys a Saab, and pursues "a life of freedom" by spending a year driving back and forth across the country.

His fortune now squandered, Nashe picks up a hot-headed young gambler named Jack Pozzi. The two hatch a plan to fleece two wealthy bachelors, Flower and Stone, in a poker game. In addition to purchasing a mansion, the two eccentrics also bought ten thousand stones, from the ruins of a fifteenth-century Irish castle destroyed by Oliver Cromwell; Flower and Stone intend to use them to build a "Wailing Wall" in the meadow behind their mansion.

Flower and Stone are not the suckers Pozzi takes them for, and the plan backfires. Out of money, Nashe risks everything on "a single blind turn of a card", putting up his car as collateral, and loses. To repay the debt, the two indenture themselves to Flower and Stone, building the meaningless wall that nobody will ever see. Nashe shrugs this off as fifty days of exercise, but Pozzi views it as a violation of human decency.

The two are watched over by Calvin Murks, the millionaires' tough but amiable hired man. After Pozzi takes a swing at him, Murks begins wearing a gun, which Pozzi takes as proof that he is nothing but a slave.

When the millionaires add further charges for food and lodging, Pozzi, convinced there is no way out of the contract, escapes the meadow. Days later Nashe finds him beaten into a coma; Pozzi soon vanishes, and Nashe is convinced that his friend is dead.

As the wall grows, so does Nashe's obsession with avenging Pozzi. Having finally worked off his debt, Nashe is taken out to celebrate by Murks and his son-in-law Floyd. The three pile into Murks's new car, Nashe's old Saab, with Nashe at the wheel, and he deliberately crashes it head-on into an oncoming vehicle.

== Influence ==
The Music of Chance was referred to in David Mitchell's 1999 novel Ghostwritten, which also deals with the nature of random chance. In the novel, one character is a member of a musical collective called The Music of Chance, named "after a novel by that New York bloke".

Dialogue from the film adaptation is used in a track by Sweet Billy Pilgrim called 'Here It Begins'.

== Adaptations ==
In 2009, Audible.com produced an audio version of The Music of Chance, narrated by Marc Vietor, as part of its Modern Vanguard line of audiobooks.
