= Danielle Maged =

American businesswoman

Danielle Maged is an American business development, sports industry and e-commerce executive, formerly the Global Head of Business Development & Partnerships for StubHub!, the world's largest online ticket marketplace, from 2004 to 2014. She was the Executive Vice President of Global Partnerships for Fox Networks Group from 2015 to 2018, and most recently, the Chief Growth Officer of Global Citizen.

== Career ==
=== Early career and background ===
Maged obtained a Bachelor of Arts degree in political science at Columbia College, New York. In 1990, Maged joined NBA Entertainment as a Broadcast Assistant, rising to become Programming Manager, before she left the NBA in 1995. She was mentioned in the Official NBA Guide of 1992 as a "Broadcast Associate" for NBA, but in The Sporting News Official NBA Guide 1994-95 she was documented as a "Programming Coordinator" for NBA, working with a team which included Gregg Winik, Stephanie Schwartz, and Charles L. Rosenzweig. Adam Silver, Deputy Commissioner for the NBA said of Maged: "She impressed me from day one with her strong work ethic, intelligence and ability to always make work fun; a wicked sense of humor. She is a technological leader among sports executives." She left the NBA to begin a two-year study for an MBA degree at Columbia Business School.

After graduating, in 1997 Maged was hired as a consultant by Fox Sports International, with a particular focus on Latin American markets. She was then appointed Director of International Strategic Planning at ESPN International. In 1999 she was Vice President of Business Development at Internet Tradeline. At Internet Tradeline, Maged was responsible for the company's first radio agreements with WBLS and WLIB. Her perception of Internet marketing at the time was given in a February 1999 interview with Billboard in which she said "These small and midsize businesses are scared of the Internet, of competing in this environment with larger chain retailers. For them, it's a tremendous benefit to be able to get up and running online without incurring a huge cost." She then became Vice President of Marketing and New Media at Madison Square Garden under Pam Harris, cited as "a crucial role model in her development into a female business leader". At Madison Square Garden she managed online and strategic growth for the brand's assets such as Radio City Music Hall, MSG Network, the New York Knicks, and the New York Rangers. Her work in these various positions have involved her in the fields of business development and strategy, internet commerce, and market analysis, marketing and sales. She also worked as a consultant for Nickelodeon International while at Columbia Business School. Maged and her twin boys and family reside in the New York City metropolitan area.

=== StubHub! ===
Maged was appointed to the Global Head of Business Development & Partnerships on the Executive Team for StubHub!, the world's largest online ticket marketplace, in 2004. She is responsible for the "strategy, negotiation and implementation of all domestic and international partnerships for the company", and under Maged the company's partnerships have grown from around 10 to over 100 partnerships. She has been cited as a "key part of the company’s growth from disruptive start-up to widely known consumer brand." After being appointed to her position, Maged began forming StubHub's earliest agreements with NFL teams, establishing the secondary ticketing sponsorship category. After becoming a full-time employee of the company in 2006, Maged formed an agreement with MLB Advanced Media, which has since been renewed. With StubHub, Maged has also overseen agreements with AEG, Apple Inc., the O2, the Staples Center, the Los Angeles Kings, 28 Major League Baseball clubs, the Washington Redskins, the Premier League Football teams Tottenham Hotspur, Everton and Sunderland, and universities such as the University of Texas, University of North Carolina, and University of Michigan, and many more. Under Maged, in June 2013, StubHub became world's first ticketing company to sign a naming rights deal when the Home Depot Center in Carson, California, home ground of the Major League Soccer teams LA Galaxy and Chivas USA became "StubHub Center". Maged cites the 2013 agreement with AEG Global, one of the world's largest owners and operators of sports and entertainment venues and live event promoters, as the "exclamation point on the efforts we’ve made over the last 10 years to basically weave ourselves into the fabric of the sports and entertainment industry." She considers the UK to now be the "launching pad" for the company and is actively seeking agreements for StubHub! in the UK and Europe, particularly in English football, which she states is a "very high interest" for the company.

== Influence ==
Maged is a recipient of the 2012 Sports Business Journal Annual Women Game Changer and the 2013 Women in Sports & Events (WISE) Woman of the Year Award for her contributions as a business leader in sports.
