= The Invention of Solitude =

1982 memoir by Paul Auster

- First edition
- Author: Paul Auster
- Language: English
- Genre: Memoir
- Publisher: Sun Publishing
- Publication date: 1982
- Publication place: United States
- Media type: Print
- Pages: 173
- ISBN: 0-915342-37-5

The Invention of Solitude is Paul Auster's debut memoir, published in 1982. The book is divided into two parts. The first part, Portrait of an Invisible Man, is about the sudden death of Auster's father. The second part, The Book of Memory, is a narrative in the third person.

== Development ==
Samuel Auster, the father of American writer Paul Auster, died in January 1979. Shortly after receiving word of Samuel Auster's death, Paul Auster resolved to write a book about his father, thinking that if he didn't, Samuel Auster's "life will vanish along with him".

In the course of writing, Auster struggled for months to write the second part of what would become The Invention of Solitude with a first person point of view; he ultimately instead narrated it in the third person.

== Publication ==
Sun published The Invention of Solitude in New York in 1982. It was Auster's debut memoir. Other editions were published by Penguin Books in 1982 and Faber & Faber in 2005.

== Synopsis ==
The Invention of Solitude is split into two parts, titled Portrait of an Invisible Man and The Book of Memory. According to Encyclopædia Britannica, The Invention of Solitude is "both a memoir about the death of his father and a meditation on the act of writing".

=== Portrait of an Invisible Man ===
This first part of The Invention of Solitude is about the unexpected death of Samuel Auster, and it describes the latter's life, influence, and idiosyncracies.

=== The Book of Memory ===
The book's second part is narrated in the third person, with Auster calling himself "A.". The text contains experimental literary techniques influenced by French writing of the time and passages of literary and art criticism about creators such as Carlo Collodi and Johannes Vermeer.

== Sources ==
- Barbour, John D. (2004). "Solitude, Writing, and Fathers in Paul Auster's The Invention of Solitude". A/B: Auto/Biography Studies. 19 (1–2): 19–32. doi:10.1080/08989575.2004.10815316.
- Barone, Dennis (Spring 1994). "Auster's Memory". Review of Contemporary Fiction. 14 (1) – via Gale Power Search.
- Canfield, Nick (May 2, 2024). "A New York Folly: Remembering Paul Auster". Brooklyn Magazine.
- Christ-Pielensticker, Katharina (2021). Literary Rooms: The Room in Contemporary U. S. Fiction by Auster, Hustvedt, Powers, and Foer. J. B. Metzler. doi:10.1007/978-3-662-63089-1. ISBN 978-3-662-63088-4.
- Creamer, Ella (May 1, 2024). "Paul Auster, American Author of The New York Trilogy, Dies Aged 77". The Guardian.
- Ford, Mark (August 1999). "Inventions of Solitude: Thoreau and Auster". Journal of American Studies. 33 (2): 201–219.
- Merwin, W. S. (February 27, 1983). "The Invention of Solitude". The New York Times. ISSN 0362-4331.
- "Paul Auster". Encyclopædia Britannica. May 2024.
- "Paul Auster". Gale Literature: Contemporary Authors. 2024.
