= Oracle Night =

Novel by Paul Auster

- First edition (US)
- Author: Paul Auster
- Language: English
- Publisher: Henry Holt (US); Faber & Faber (UK)
- Publication date: 2003
- Publication place: United States
- Media type: Print (hardback)
- Pages: 256 pp
- ISBN: 0-8050-7320-5
- OCLC: 57005889

Oracle Night is the tenth novel of American writer Paul Auster. It was published in 2003.

== Brief summary ==
The novel is about a writer named Sidney Orr. (Note: A short, Americanized version of the Polish surname Orlovsky) After making a miraculous recovery from a near fatal illness, Orr buys a new notebook and starts writing a story about a man who completely changed his life when he realized how much his existence was ruled by randomness.

The basic premise of the novel is that Sidney Orr is trying to come back to his life and begin writing again. The narrative proceeds by relating the things that happen both in Sidney's work and personal life, and also to the life of Nick Bowen, the central character of Orr’s work-in-progress novel. Before the end of this period in Sidney's life, events will take place that are truly life-altering, and Sidney will, much like the fictional character he writes of, have to deal with issues and questions he has previously (perhaps unconsciously) been avoiding for several years.

== Background ==
The main character, Sidney Orr, shares some biographical details with Paul Auster. Both are residents of Brooklyn, New York, and both are writers. Also Orr's wife (Grace) bears some physical resemblance to Auster's wife, Siri Hustvedt.

Furthermore, similarities between Auster and a supporting character in Oracle Night —John Trause— are also apparent. Trause, an anagram of Auster, is the same age as Auster was (age 56) when this novel was published in 2003. Also, Trause has a son by his first wife who (like Auster's son Daniel by his first wife, Lydia Davis) gets into trouble with drugs. Like Auster, Trause was born in New Jersey and lived in Paris, France for a period of his life. Similarly, Trause’s first wife (like Auster's) was born in Massachusetts.
