= 4 3 2 1 (novel) =

Novel by Paul Auster

- First edition (US)
- Author: Paul Auster
- Illustrator: Charles Taylor
- Cover artist: Rick Pracher
- Language: English
- Publisher: Henry Holt and Co. (US); Faber & Faber (UK)
- Publication date: January 31, 2017
- Publication place: United States
- Media type: Print (Hardback)
- Pages: 866 pp (hardback edition)
- ISBN: 978-1-62779-446-6

4 3 2 1 is a 2017 novel by Paul Auster published by Henry Holt and Co. It describes four alternate versions of the life of Archie Ferguson in the 1950s and 1960s, and explores how an individual's life and personality is shaped by chance and circumstance.

In September 2017 it was shortlisted for the 2017 Man Booker Prize. It reached #13 on The New York Times Best Seller list in February 2017.

== Plot summary and overview ==
The novel describes four alternate versions of the life of Archie Ferguson. Each of the seven chapters in the book is divided into four parts (1.1, 1.2, 1.3, 1.4, 2.1... etc.) which represent the different versions of his life. Ferguson (as he's known in the book) grows up with the same Jewish, middle-class parents, Stanley and Rose, as well as many of the same friends, including Amy Schneiderman, his girlfriend/friend. However, the relationships change with each Ferguson version. Due to the individual circumstances, his lives take very different paths.

The story is set in Newark, New Jersey, New York City, Paris and London in the 1950s and 1960s. As Archie grows through young adulthood, events such as the Attack on Richard Nixon's motorcade in Caracas, Venezuela, Vietnam War, Civil Rights, the Kennedy election and assassination, the Northeast blackout of 1965, white flight from Newark, the 1968 Columbia University protests and the reaction of American Jews to the Six Days War are all covered.

His different lives diverge from mundane matters – in which suburb, out of several plausible choices, did his parents choose to buy a house after his birth? But from that develops in each life a different school in which Ferguson would study, different schoolmates and teachers, different girls he would meet as a teenager, and also different conditions for the development of his father's business – altogether accumulating into four lives significantly different from each other. The four divergent stories follow his home life as well as college years, his love life and political ideas. Depending on the version of his life, Ferguson experiences various identity issues.

In one life, he loses his father at the age of seven, leaving him deeply scarred. In another life, the schemes of his father's crooked brothers cause the collapse of the family business, destroying his father's dream of financial success – but the family manages to live a reasonably happy though not affluent life. In yet another life, the father got rid in time of these nasty brothers and built up a commercial empire – but Ferguson is sickened by a life of nouveau riche conspicuous consumption and becomes totally alienated from a workaholic father who works twelve to fourteen hours a day and has little time or energy left for his family. In one life Ferguson's mother runs a modest suburban photo studio, in another life she has become a well known artistic photographer, and in a third life she is a photojournalist.

In all his lives Ferguson is deeply in love with the formidable and incomparable Amy Schneiderman, but only in one life does she become his steady girlfriend. In another life they only have a brief affair and then she moves elsewhere, while in a third life his divorced mother marries her widowed father, suddenly making them into step-siblings and ruling out any possibility of an intimate relationship between them. In most lives he does not question his heterosexuality, but in one life a series of experiences makes him discover himself as bisexual and he increasingly displays a preference for men – influenced by living with an expatriate bisexual American woman based in Paris. In another life he has an affair with his former high school teacher that ends unhappily. In one life the school principal threatens to expel him over an article he wrote to the school paper, denouncing American Imperialism in Latin America; in another life he is politically indifferent, which causes his beloved Amy to reject him in disgust; in yet another life he and Amy together get involved in the anti-Vietnam War movement, but break up when she becomes a revolutionary while he remains skeptical of the chances of a Socialist revolution in America.

== Background and publication ==
Auster worked on the book seven days a week for three-and-a-half-years and wrote it in long hand. At 866 pages, the novel is much longer than any of his previous works.

Though none of Ferguson's lives is a precise autobiography, Ferguson shares quite a few features of Auster's own life: birth in 1947 to Jewish middle-class parents, growing up in New Jersey – specifically, in Newark and its suburbs, left-wing views, and spending some time in France (Ferguson does it in various lives, under different circumstances in each). Like Auster himself, Ferguson in all his lives feels at home in New York City and has an abiding interest in French culture and language.

At the time of its publication, it was Auster's first novel published in seven years.

== Reception ==
At the time of its publication in January and February 2017, the book received mixed reviews, and proved polarizing with critics. Novelist Tom Perrotta, reviewing for The New York Times, praised the novel's ambition, scope, and narrative structure, comparing 4 3 2 1 to Life After Life by Kate Atkinson. In The Seattle Times, David Takami praised Auster's novel, especially its descriptions of history and the characterization of its protagonist.

Michelle Dean of the Los Angeles Times was critical of the book, writing that the novel was too long, repetitive, and overly detailed.

On February 19, 2017, the novel reached #13 on the New York Times Best Seller list.
