= Invisible (Auster novel) =

Novel by Paul Auster

- First edition
- Author: Paul Auster
- Language: English
- Publisher: Henry Holt and Co.
- Publication date: October 27, 2009
- Publication place: United States
- Media type: Print (Hardback) and Audio CD
- Pages: 320
- ISBN: 0-8050-9080-0
- OCLC: 229464027

Invisible is a novel by Paul Auster published in 2009 by Henry Holt and Company. It was Auster's fifteenth novel. The book is divided into four overlapping parts, told by three different narrators.

== Plot summary ==
The first section, titled "Spring" and told in first person, chronicles the entanglement of Columbia University student Adam Walker with French political science professor Rudolf Born, who meet in New York City in the spring of 1967 and who form an alliance to publish a literary magazine. Their friendship splinters as a result of a tense love triangle with Born's girlfriend Margot and as a result of a late night mugging that ends in violence.

The second section, "Summer" describes the events in Adam's life later that summer in New York sharing an apartment with his older sister, Gwyn. This section of the story is told in second person. Adam's story of the summer of 1967 is also framed by his having sent his manuscript, written in 2007, to a college friend of his, James Freeman, who we are told is a famous author. In the framing story, James tells us how he receives the manuscript from a dying Adam and they arrange to meet.

In the third section, "Fall" we learn that Adam, in 2007, has died before he and James could meet, and has completed only notes of the third and final section of his memoir of 1967. James fleshes out the notes Adam has left in a third person account. "Fall" tells the story of Adam's trip to Paris, where he encounters Born and Margot, as well as other friends of Born's, a woman named Hélène and her daughter Cécile. Adam inserts himself into the lives of these women and contrives a scheme to atone for guilt he carries stemming from his actions following the mugging in New York.

The final section takes place in 2007. James has been told by Gwyn that the major events of the second section of the book are entirely made-up, and James wonders whether any of the purported memoir is true. In searching for corroboration, James tracks down Cécile, now a distinguished literary scholar. She concludes the story by describing in her diary how she, in 2007, has a final strange contact with Rudolf Born, at his remote island home in the Caribbean.

== Themes ==
The book centers on the tension between sex and war in the hearts of 1960s radicals, and the magnetism of intelligence and evil. As with much of Auster's work the novel deals with questions of shifting identity, puzzles and illusion, a persistent sense of dread, and of characters feeling trapped by circumstances over which they have no control.

== Reviews ==
- "Invisible by Paul Auster: review" at The Telegraph
- "Invisible, by Paul Auster" at The Independent
- "Invisible by Paul Auster" at The Guardian
- "Love Crimes" at The New York Times
