= Paul Auster =

American writer and film director (1947–2024)

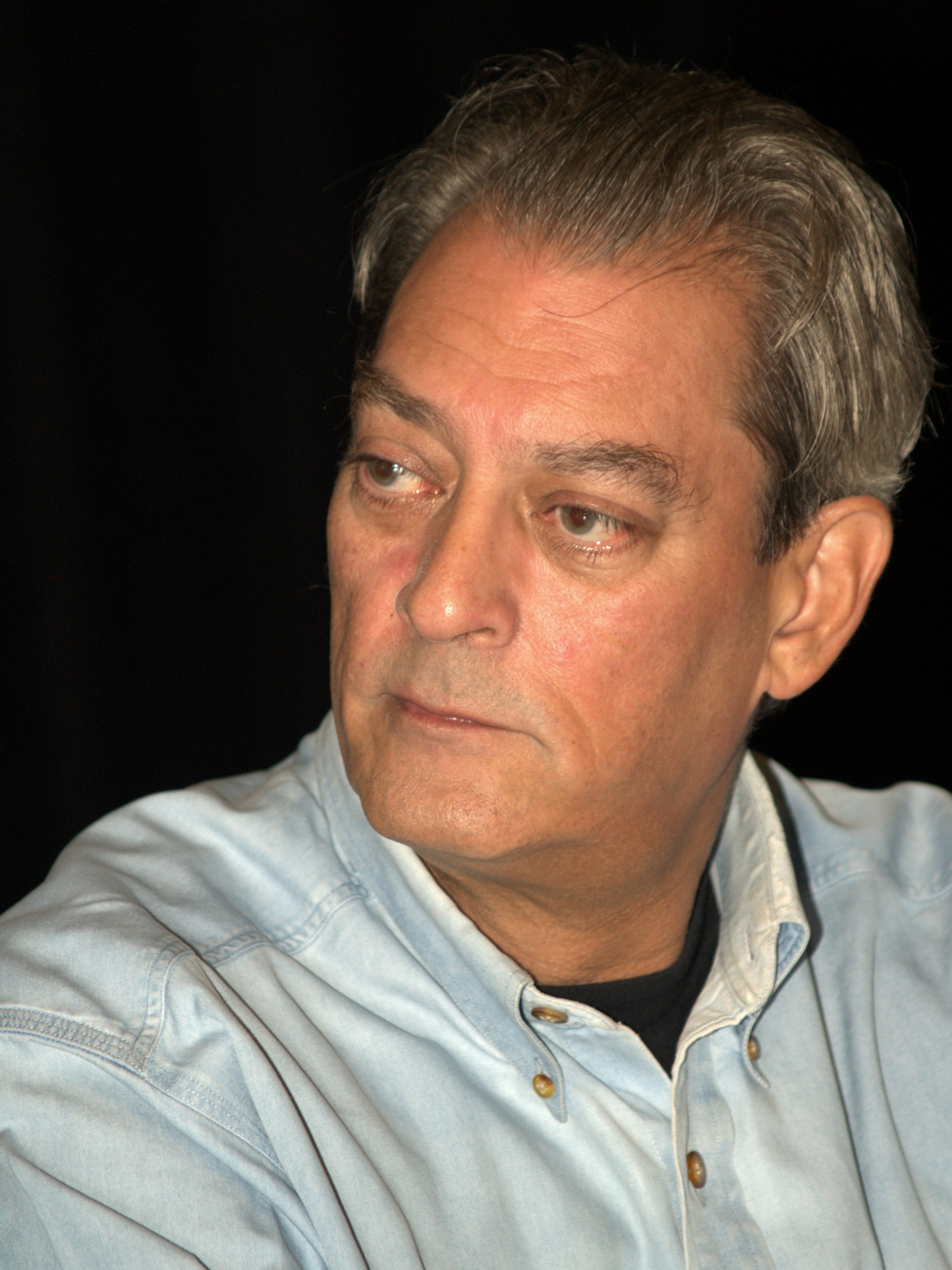
- Auster in 2010
- Born: Paul Benjamin Auster; February 3, 1947; Newark, New Jersey, U.S.
- Died: April 30, 2024 (aged 77); New York City, U.S.
- Education: Columbia University (BA, MA)
- Occupations: Novelist; poet; filmmaker; translator
- Spouses: Lydia Davis (m. 1974; div. 1977) Siri Hustvedt (m. 1982)
- Children: 2, including Sophie Auster
- Relatives: Allen Mandelbaum (uncle)
- Writing career
- Pen name: Paul Benjamin
- Period: 1974–2024
- Genres: Poetry, literary fiction
- Notable works: The Invention of Solitude (1982), The New York Trilogy (1987), In the Country of Last Things (1987), The Music of Chance (1990), True Tales of American Life (2001), The Book of Illusions (2002), Winter Journal (2012), 4 3 2 1 (2017), Burning Boy (2021), Bloodbath Nation (2023).
- Website: paul-auster.com

Signature
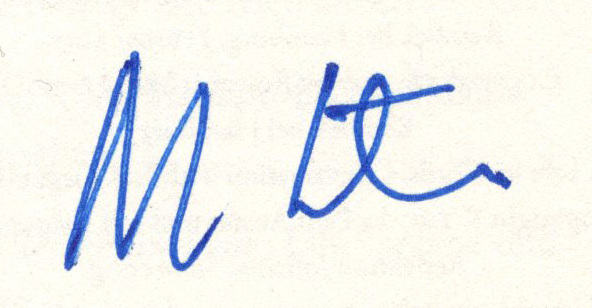

Paul Benjamin Auster (February 3, 1947 – April 30, 2024) was an American writer, novelist, memoirist, poet, and filmmaker. His notable works include The New York Trilogy (1987), Moon Palace (1989), The Music of Chance (1990), True Tales of American Life (2001), The Book of Illusions (2002), The Brooklyn Follies (2005), Invisible (2009), Sunset Park (2010), Winter Journal (2012), 4 3 2 1 (2017), and Bloodbath Nation (2023). His books have been translated into more than 40 languages.

== Early life ==
Paul Auster was born in Newark, New Jersey, son of Samuel Auster, a landlord who owned buildings with his brothers in Jersey City, and Queenie, née Bogat. His middle-class parents were Jewish, of Austrian descent; the marriage was an unhappy one, and they divorced during Auster's senior year of high school, he moving with his mother and sister to an apartment at Weequahic, Newark. An uncle was the translator Allen Mandelbaum. Auster grew up in South Orange, New Jersey, and Newark, and graduated from Columbia High School in Maplewood.

During the summers of 1958 and 1959, Auster attended, respectively, Camp LakeView (East Brunswick, NJ) and Camp Pontiac (Copake, NY), where his outstanding athletic talents were recognized, especially as a baseball infielder. While attending summer camp, the 14-year-old Auster witnessed what he called the "seminal experience" of his life: a boy being struck by lightning and dying instantly. The boy was crawling under barbed wire a few inches away from him at the time. This event changed his life, causing him to think about it every day.

== Career ==
After graduating from Columbia University with B.A. and M.A. degrees (English, Comparative Literature) in 1970, he moved to Paris where, among other jobs, he tried to earn a living translating French literature. After returning to the United States in 1974, he continued to work on his poems, essays, and translations of French writers, such as Stéphane Mallarmé and Joseph Joubert. His work as a translator led to the publication in 1982 of The Random House Book of Twentieth-Century French Poetry, which he edited.

Following the appearance in 1982 of his acclaimed debut work, a memoir titled The Invention of Solitude, Auster gained renown for a series of three loosely connected novellas published collectively as The New York Trilogy (1987), and is often cited as his most widely known work to the general reading public.

Although The New York Trilogy gives a nod to the detective genre, they are not conventional detective stories organized around solving mysteries. Rather, Auster uses the detective form to address questions of identity, space, language, and literature, creating his own distinctively postmodern form in the process. Auster disagrees with this analysis, because he believes that "the Trilogy grows directly out of The Invention of Solitude".

Similar to the themes explored in The New York Trilogy, the search for identity and personal meaning continued to permeate the three novels Auster published in quick succession in the late 1980s. Whether writing about the relationships between people caught in the flux of an uncertain future and uncertain identity (In the Country of Last Things [1987] and Moon Palace [1989]), or the role of coincidence and random events in our lives (The Music of Chance [1990]), Auster was steadily increasing his readership and popularity.

During the 1990s, Auster published three more novels, but he increasingly turned his attention to script writing and filmmaking by way of his screenplay and directorial collaborations with Wayne Wang on Smoke (which won Auster the Independent Spirit Award for Best First Screenplay) and Blue in the Face. He also directed the movie Lulu on the Bridge (1998). (Note: Prior to meeting Wayne Wong who first invited Auster to collaborate on all aspects of the filmmaking process, Auster did have some limited involvement in the film adaptation of his novel The Music of Chance via consultation and a small cameo appearance (uncredited) toward the end of the film)

After a steadfast commitment to filmmaking during the late 1990s, Auster decided to turn his attention once again to writing novels, memoirs, and essays during the remaining two decades of his life. Between 2002 and 2024, Auster published nine novels, two memoirs, an 800-page biography of Stephen Crane (Burning Boy), and a sustained jeremiad (Auster calls it a "political pamphlet") on the long, unending history of gun violence in America (Bloodbath Nation). Eight of the final ten novels Auster published during his lifetime (from 1999 to 2023) received nominations for the International Dublin Award, and Auster's 2017 novel 4 3 2 1 was shortlisted for the Man Booker Prize.

Auster was on the PEN American Center board of trustees from 2004 to 2009 and its vice president from 2005 through 2007.

In 2012, Auster said in an interview that he would not visit Turkey, in protest at its treatment of journalists. Turkish Prime Minister Recep Tayyip Erdoğan replied: "As if we need you! Who cares if you come, or not?" Auster responded: "According to the latest numbers gathered by International PEN, there are nearly one hundred writers imprisoned in Turkey, not to speak of independent publishers such as Ragıp Zarakolu, whose case is being closely watched by PEN Centers around the world."

Auster was willing to give Iranian translators permission to write Persian versions of his works in exchange for a small fee; Iran does not recognize international copyright laws.

One of Auster's later books, A Life in Words, was published in October 2017 by Seven Stories Press. It brought together two years of conversations with the Danish scholar I.B. Siegumfeldt about each of Auster's fiction and non-fiction works. It has been a primary source for understanding Auster's approach to his works.

== Reception ==
"Over the past twenty-five years", wrote Michael Dirda in The New York Review of Books in 2008, "Paul Auster has established one of the most distinctive niches in contemporary literature". Dirda extolled his virtues in The Washington Post, attesting that Auster had "perfected a limpid, confessional style" and constructed suspenseful, sometimes autobiographical plots. His heroes operated in a world that appeared familiar but they confronted "vague menace and possible hallucination."

Writing about Auster's 2017 novel 4 3 2 1, Booklist critic Donna Seaman remarked that Auster went beyond conventions of storytelling and mixed genres, even crossing over into filmic modes. She praised the complex sense of wonder and gratitude in his works, which often features "sly humor" in an oeuvre which she considered "a grand experiment, not only in storytelling, but also in the endless nature-versus-nurture debate, the perpetual dance between inheritance and free will, intention and chance, dreams and fate. This elaborate investigation into the big what-if is also a mesmerizing dramatization of the multitude of clashing selves we each harbor within."

The English critic James Wood criticized Auster for what he considered "borrowed language" and "bogus dialogue", nonetheless conceding that Auster was "probably America's best-known postmodern novelist". Wood noted: "One reads Auster's novels very fast, because they are lucidly written, because the grammar of the prose is the grammar of the most familiar realism (the kind that is, in fact, comfortingly artificial), and because the plots, full of sneaky turns and surprises and violent irruptions, have what the Times once called 'all the suspense and pace of a bestselling thriller'."

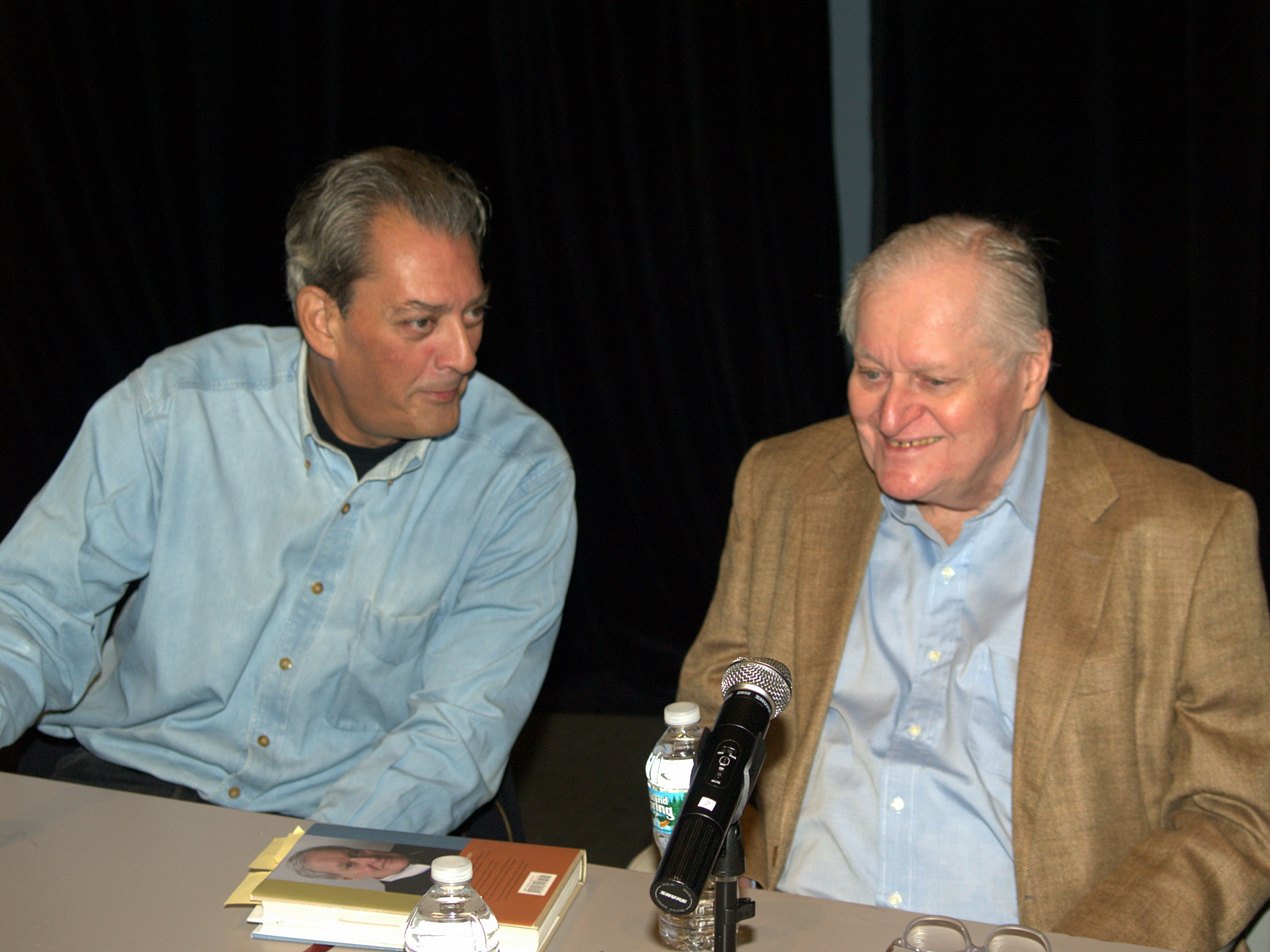
Auster with John Ashbery at the Brooklyn Book Festival

== Personal life and death ==
Auster's first marriage, to award-winning writer Lydia Davis, lasted from 1974 until their separation in 1979; they divorced in 1981. Their only child, Daniel, was charged in April 2022 with second-degree manslaughter and criminally negligent homicide following the fentanyl and heroin overdose death of his 10-month-old daughter. He died later that month of an accidental drug overdose.

In 1981, Auster married his second wife, writer Siri Hustvedt, the daughter of professor and scholar Lloyd Hustvedt. They lived in Brooklyn and had one daughter, Sophie Auster, a singer.

Paul Auster characterized his politics as "far to the left of the Democratic Party", but said he voted Democratic because he doubted a socialist candidate could win. He described right-wing Republicans as "jihadists", and the election of Donald Trump as "the most appalling thing I've seen in politics in my life".

On March 11, 2023, Auster's wife Siri Hustvedt revealed on Instagram that he had been diagnosed with cancer in December 2022, and that he had been treated at the Memorial Sloan Kettering Cancer Center in New York since then.

Paul Auster died of complications from lung cancer at his home in Brooklyn, on April 30, 2024, at the age of 77. He was survived by his wife Siri Hustvedt, their daughter Sophie Auster, his sister Janet Auster, and a grandson.

== Awards and honors ==
- 1989: Prix France Culture de Littérature Étrangère
- 1990: Morton Dauwen Zabel Award from the American Academy of Arts and Letters
- 1991: PEN/Faulkner Award for Fiction shortlist for The Music of Chance
- 1993: Prix Médicis Étranger for Leviathan
- 1995: Independent Spirit award for best first screenplay for Smoke
- 1996: Bodil Awards – Best American Film: Smoke
- 1996: John William Corrington Award for Literary Excellence
- 2001: International Dublin Literary Award longlist for Timbuktu
- 2003: Fellow of the American Academy of Arts and Sciences
- 2004: International Dublin Literary Award shortlist for The Book of Illusions
- 2006: Prince of Asturias Award for Literature
- 2006: Elected to the American Academy of Arts and Letters for Literature
- 2007: Honorary doctor from the University of Liège
- 2007: International Dublin Literary Award longlist for The Brooklyn Follies
- 2007: Commandeur de l'Ordre des Arts et des Lettres
- 2008: International Dublin Literary Award longlist for Travels in the Scriptorium
- 2009: Premio Leteo (León, Spain)
- 2010: Médaille Grand Vermeil de la ville de Paris
- 2010: International Dublin Literary Award longlist for Man in the Dark
- 2011: International Dublin Literary Award longlist for Invisible
- 2012: International Dublin Literary Award longlist for Sunset Park
- 2012: NYC Literary Honors for fiction
- 2017: Booker Prize Shortlist for 4 3 2 1
- 2019: International Dublin Literary Award longlist for 4 3 2 1

== Published works ==
=== Fiction ===
- Squeeze Play (1982) (written under pseudonym Paul Benjamin)
- The New York Trilogy (1987) ISBN 9780140169638
  - City of Glass (1985)
  - Ghosts (1986)
  - The Locked Room (1986)
- In the Country of Last Things (1987) ISBN 9780140097054
- Moon Palace (1989) ISBN 9781101563816
- The Music of Chance (1990) ISBN 9780140157390
- Leviathan (1992)
- Mr. Vertigo (1994)
- Timbuktu (1999)
- The Book of Illusions (2002)
- Oracle Night (2003)
- The Brooklyn Follies (2005)
- Travels in the Scriptorium (2006)
- Man in the Dark (2008)
- Invisible (2009)
- Sunset Park (2010)
- Day/Night (2013) (Note: This reprints both Travels in the Scriptorium and Man in the Dark, together in a single volume)
- 4 3 2 1 (2017)
- Baumgartner (2023)

=== Memoir ===
- The Invention of Solitude (1982)
- The Red Notebook (1995) (originally printed in Granta (44); 1993)
- Hand to Mouth (1997)
- Winter Journal (2012)
- Report from the Interior (2013)

=== Nonfiction ===
- The Art of Hunger (1992)
- Collected Prose (contains The Invention of Solitude, The Art of Hunger, The Red Notebook, and Hand to Mouth as well as various other previously uncollected pieces) (first edition, 2005; expanded second edition, 2010)
- Here and Now: Letters, 2008–2011 (2013) A collection of letters exchanged with J. M. Coetzee
- A Life in Words: In Conversation with I. B. Siegumfeldt (2017)
- Talking to Strangers: Selected Essays, Prefaces, and Other Writings, 1967–2017 (2019)
- Groundwork: Autobiographical Writings, 1979–2012 (2020)
- Burning Boy: The Life and Work of Stephen Crane (2021)
- Long Live King Kobe: Following the Murder of Tyler Kobe Nichols [with photographs by Spencer Ostrander] (2022)
- Bloodbath Nation [with photographs by Spencer Ostrander] (2023)

=== Poetry ===
- Unearth (1974)
- Wall Writing (1976)
- Fragments from the Cold (1977)
- Facing the Music (1980)
- Disappearances: Selected Poems (1988)
- Ground Work: Selected Poems and Essays 1970–1979 (1990)
- Collected Poems (2007)
- White Spaces: Selected Poems and Early Prose (2020) (Note: The contents of this book have been taken from the following previously published volumes: Unearth (Living Hand, 1974), Wall Writing (The Figures, 1976), Fragments from Cold (Parenthèse, 1977), White Spaces (Station Hill, 1980), Facing the Music (Station Hill, 1980), and The Art of Hunger (Menard Press, 1982). "Spokes" originally appeared in Poetry (March 1972); "First Words" is published here for the first time.)

=== Screenplays ===
- Smoke (1995)
- Blue in the Face (1995)
- Lulu on the Bridge (1998)
- The Inner Life of Martin Frost (2007) (Note: "The Inner Life of Martin Frost" is a fictional movie that is described in full in Auster's novel The Book of Illusions. It is the only film that David Zimmer —the protagonist of the latter novel— watches of Hector Mann's later, hidden films. It is the story of a man meeting a girl – an intense relationship with a touch of supernatural elements. Auster later created a real movie of the same name. (also see "Other Media" section below).)

=== Edited collections ===
- The Random House Book of Twentieth-Century French Poetry (1982)
- True Tales of American Life (first published under the title I Thought My Father Was God, and Other True Tales from NPR's National Story Project) (2001)

=== Translations ===
- Fits and Starts: Selected Poems of Jacques Dupin, translated by Paul Auster, Living Hand Editions, 1974
- "The Uninhabited: Selected Poems of André du Bouchet" (1976)
- Life/Situations, by Jean-Paul Sartre (1977) (in collaboration with Lydia Davis)
- Aboard the Aquitaine, by Georges Simenon (1979) (with Lydia Davis)
- A Tomb for Anatole by Stéphane Mallarmé (1983)
- Chronicle of the Guayaki Indians (1998) (translation of Pierre Clastres' ethnography Chronique des indiens Guayaki)
- Vicious Circles: Two fictions & "After the Fact", by Maurice Blanchot, 1999
- The Notebooks of Joseph Joubert (2005)

=== Miscellaneous ===
- Auggie Wren's Christmas Story (1990) (Note: A Christmas story that first appeared on the Op-Ed page of The New York Times on December 25, 1990. It led to Auster's collaboration on a film adaptation, "Smoke".)
- The Story of My Typewriter with paintings by Sam Messer (2002)
- "The Accidental Rebel" (April 23, 2008: article in The New York Times)
- "ALONE" (2015) – Prose piece from 1969 published in six copies along with "Becoming the Other in Translation" (2014) by Siri Hustvedt. Published by Danish small press Ark Editions.
- "Film Close Up: Smoke and Blue in the Face" (2022) Book by Chris Wade on Auster and Wayne Wang's 1995 films. Auster was interviewed for the book and helped with the edit.

== Other media ==
- In 1993, a movie adaptation of The Music of Chance was released. Auster features in a cameo role at the end of the film.
- In 1994 City of Glass was adapted as a graphic novel by artist David Mazzucchelli and Paul Karasik. Auster's close friend, noted cartoonist Art Spiegelman, produced the adaptation.
- In 1998, Auster was the executive producer on the short film I Remember from filmmaker Avi Zev Weider, who adapted it from Joe Brainard’s book I Remember. (Note: Auster wrote that Brainard’s “I Remember is a masterpiece. One by one, the so-called important books of our time will be forgotten, but Joe Brainard's modest little gem will endure. In simple, forthright, declarative sentences, he charts the map of the human soul and permanently alters the way we look at the world. I Remember is both uproariously funny and deeply moving. It is also one of the few totally original books I have ever read.”)
- From 1999 to 2001, Auster was part of NPR's National Story Project, a monthly radio show in which, together With NPR correspondent Jacki Lyden, Auster read stories sent in by NPR listeners across America. Listeners were invited to send in stories of "anywhere from two paragraphs to two pages" that "must be true", from which Auster later selected entries, edited them and subsequently read them on the air. Auster read over 4,000 stories submitted to the show, with a few dozen eventually featured on the show and many more anthologized in two 2002 books edited by Auster.
- Jazz trumpeter and composer Michael Mantler's 2001 album Hide and Seek borrows the words and language from Auster's short play Hide and Seek, which Mantler found in Auster's Hand to Mouth.
- Don Delillo‘s 2003 novel Cosmopolis is dedicated to Auster.
- Auster narrated "Ground Zero" (2004), an audio guide created by the Kitchen Sisters (Davia Nelson and Nikki Silva) and Soundwalk and produced by NPR, which won the Dalton Pen Award for Multi-media/Audio (2005), and was nominated for an Audie Award for best Original Work (2005).
- Austrian composer Olga Neuwirth's composition ... ce qui arrive ... (2004) combines the recorded voice of Paul Auster reading from his books Hand to Mouth and The Red Notebook, either as straight recitation, integrated with other sounds as if in a radio play, or passed through an electronically realized string resonator so that the low tones interact with those of a string ensemble. A video by Dominique Gonzalez-Foerster runs throughout the work featuring the cabaret artist and actress Georgette Dee.
- In 2005 his daughter, Sophie, recorded an album of songs in both French and English, entitled Sophie Auster, with the band One Ring Zero, which included a few songs that her father provided the lyrics for.
- Auster's voice may be heard on the 2005 album entitled We Must Be Losing It by The Farangs. The two tracks are entitled "Obituary in the Present Tense" and "Between the Lines".
- In 2006 Auster directed the film The Inner Life of Martin Frost, based on an original screenplay by him. It was shot in Lisbon and Azenhas do Mar and starred David Thewlis, Iréne Jacob, and Michael Imperioli as well as Auster's daughter Sophie. Auster provided the narration, albeit uncredited. The film premiered at the European Film Market, as part of the 2007 Berlinale in Berlin, Germany on February 10, 2007, and opened in New York City on September 7 of the same year.
- The lyrics of Fionn Regan's 2006 song "Put A Penny in the Slot" mention Auster and his novella Timbuktu.
- In the 2008 novel To the End of the Land by David Grossman, the bedroom bookshelf of the central IDF soldier character Ofer is described as prominently displaying several Auster titles.
- In the 2009 documentary Act of God, Auster is interviewed on his experience of watching another boy struck and killed by lightning when he was 14.
- In the 2011 documentary on Charlotte Rampling The Look, Auster meditates on beauty with Rampling on his moored tug boat on the Hudson River.
