= Schnoor (surname) =

Schnoor is a German surname. Notable people with the surname include:

- Benny Schnoor (1922–2003), Danish cyclist
- David Schnoor (born 1961), American politician
- Hans Schnoor (1893–1976), German musicologist, journalist, and music critic
- Herbert Schnoor (1927–2021), German politician and lawyer
- Horst Schnoor (1934–2026), German footballer
- Lacy Schnoor (born 1985), American freestyle skier
- Stefan Schnoor (born 1971), German footballer
- Stevi Schnoor (born 1985), Canadian American football and rugby football player

== See also ==
- Schnorr, another surname
- Schnoor, neighbourhood in Germany
