= Michael Simon (stage director) =

German theatre director

- Born: 25 January 1958 (age 68); Neumünster, Germany
- Occupations: Scenic designer, theatre director and opera director

Michael Simon (born 25 January 1958, Neumünster, Germany) is a German theatre director, opera director and scenic designer.

== Career ==
Michael Simon is a German designer and director for ballet, theater and opera. His designs have been seen all over the world from Australia to Canada and the US, from Japan to China and throughout Europe. He has worked for many years with the choreographers Jiri Kylian and William Forsythe. The titles of some of the works are Isabel's Dance, Impressing the Czar, Limb's Theorem, Kaguyahime, Stepping Stones, Whereabouts Unknown, Wings of Wax, Arcimboldo, One of a kind, Doux Messonges and Zugvögel.

His working relationship as stage designer with Pierre Audi, director of the Amsterdam Opera started in 1990 with Claudio Monteverdi's Il ritorno d’Ulisse in patria and continued until 2011 with the production of the two Iphigenie operas by Christoph Willibald Gluck. Amongst other designs the most important were Writing to Vermeer, directed by Peter Greenaway and Saskia Boddecke in the Amsterdam opera, Wozzeck at the Brussels opera, directed by David Freemann, Paul Claudel's drama Tête d'or directed by Anne Delbee at Comédie Française, Paris, The Peony Pavilion, a ballet with choreography by Fei Bo directed by Li Liuyi for the National Ballet of China, Beijing.

Michael Simon started directing his own projects with Elements of Crime (1988) at the Nederlands Dans Theater, Newtons Casino (1990), Roman Dogs (1991) - together with composer Heiner Goebbels - for Theater am Turm in Frankfurt and produced two Ballets for the Bayrischische Staatsoper In the Country of Last Things 2006 and Der Gelbe Klang in 2014. The first opera he directed 1993 in Basel: Die Menschen, followed by Der Fliegende Holländer in Darmstadt and Moses und Aron in Bremen. At the Bonn opera he directed several contemporary operas between 1998 and 2002. He staged the world premiere of “L espace dernier” by Matthias Pintscher 2004 at the Paris Opera Bastille. His latest opera productions were Salome in Braunschweig and Freyschütz in Bern both 2013.

Since his debut as drama director with Black Rider 1994 in Dortmund he has been invited to theaters like Schaubühne Berlin, Volksbühne Berlin, Burgtheater Wien, Düsseldorfer Schauspielhaus, Residenztheater München. Since 2005 he directed several plays by Elfriede Jelinek and Peter Handke in Karlsruhe, Freiburg and Graz where Immer noch Sturm was opening in February 2014. The latest production was in 2015 with Das Schweigende Mädchen in Dortmund. Michael Simon has been teaching stage and lighting design 1998 to 2004 as Professor at HfG Karlsruhe and since 2008 at ZHdK Zurich. Since 2012 he is married to Franziska Greber.

== Significant stagings ==
- 1994 – The Black Rider by Robert Wilson, William S. Burroughs and Tom Waits in Stadttheater Dortmund
- 1995 – Dr. Jekyll und Mr. Hyde depending on Robert Louis Stevenson, Freie Volksbühne Berlin
- 1995 – Der Fliegende Holländer by Richard Wagner in Staatstheater Darmstadt
- 1995 – Moses und Aron by Arnold Schoenberg in Theater Bremen
- 1996 – Tosca! depending on Sardou, Text Christoph Schuenke, Music Achim Kubinski in Burgtheater Wien
- 1997 – Woyzeck by Georg Büchner in Schaubühne Berlin
- 2000 – Shockheaded Peter by P. McDermott, J. Crouch in Düsseldorfer Schauspielhaus
- 2002 – Doctor Faustus Lights the Lights by Gertrude Stein in Maxim Gorki Theater Berlin
- 2003 – Stadt aus Glas by Paul Auster in Düsseldorfer Schauspielhaus
- 2004 – Peer Gynt by Henrik Ibsen in Düsseldorfer Schauspielhaus
- 2004 – L’espace dernier by Matthias Pintscher in Opera National de Paris
- 2005 – Prinzessinnendramen by Elfriede Jelinek, Badisches Staatstheater Karlsruhe
- 2006 – Hamlet by William Shakespeare in Staatsschauspiel Dresden
- 2006 – Heil, Hitler! by Rolf Hochhuth in Nationaltheater Weimar (This performance was cancelled by the author, as the director intended to change the story of the piece against his will.
- 2006 – In the Country of Last Things Ballett by Michael Simon in Bayerisches Staatsballett
- 2007 – Ulrike Maria Stuart by Elfriede Jelinek in Stadttheater Freiburg
- 2008 – Lohengrin by Richard Wagner in Opernhaus Nürnberg
- 2008 – Das Spiel vom Fragen by Peter Handke, Badisches Staatstheater Karlsruhe
- 2009 – Cabaret by John Kander, Fred Ebb, Joe Masteroff in Schauspiel Frankfurt
- 2010 – Richard III by William Shakespeare in Theater Basel
- 2011 – Orphée by Jean Cocteau in Schauspiel Frankfurt
- 2011 – Winterreise by Elfriede Jelinek, Badisches Staatstheater Karlsruhe
- 2012 – Rechnitz (Der Würgeengel) by Elfriede Jelinek, Schauspielhaus Graz, Austrian debut performance
- 2013 – Salome by Richard Strauss, Staatstheater Braunschweig
- 2013 – Freyschütz, by Carl Maria von Weber, Theater Bern
- 2015 – Das Schweigende Mädchen by Elfriede Jelinek, Dortmund
