= Gréber =

Gréber or Greber is a surname. Notable people with the surname include:

- Christian Greber (born 1972), Austrian former Olympic alpine skier
- Franziska Greber (born 1954), Swiss artist with a focus on violence against women
- Henri-Léon Gréber (1854–1941), French sculptor, and medallist
- Jacques Gréber (1882–1962), French architect specializing in landscape architecture and urban design
- Jakob Greber (died 1731), German Baroque composer and musician
- Johannes Greber (1874–1944), German Catholic priest, renounced his vows after attending a séance

== See also ==
- Boulevard Gréber (or Gréber Boulevard), a principal arterial road in Gatineau, Quebec
- Greber Plan (1946–1950), a major urban plan developed for Canada's National Capital Region by Jacques Gréber
