= Einfelder See =

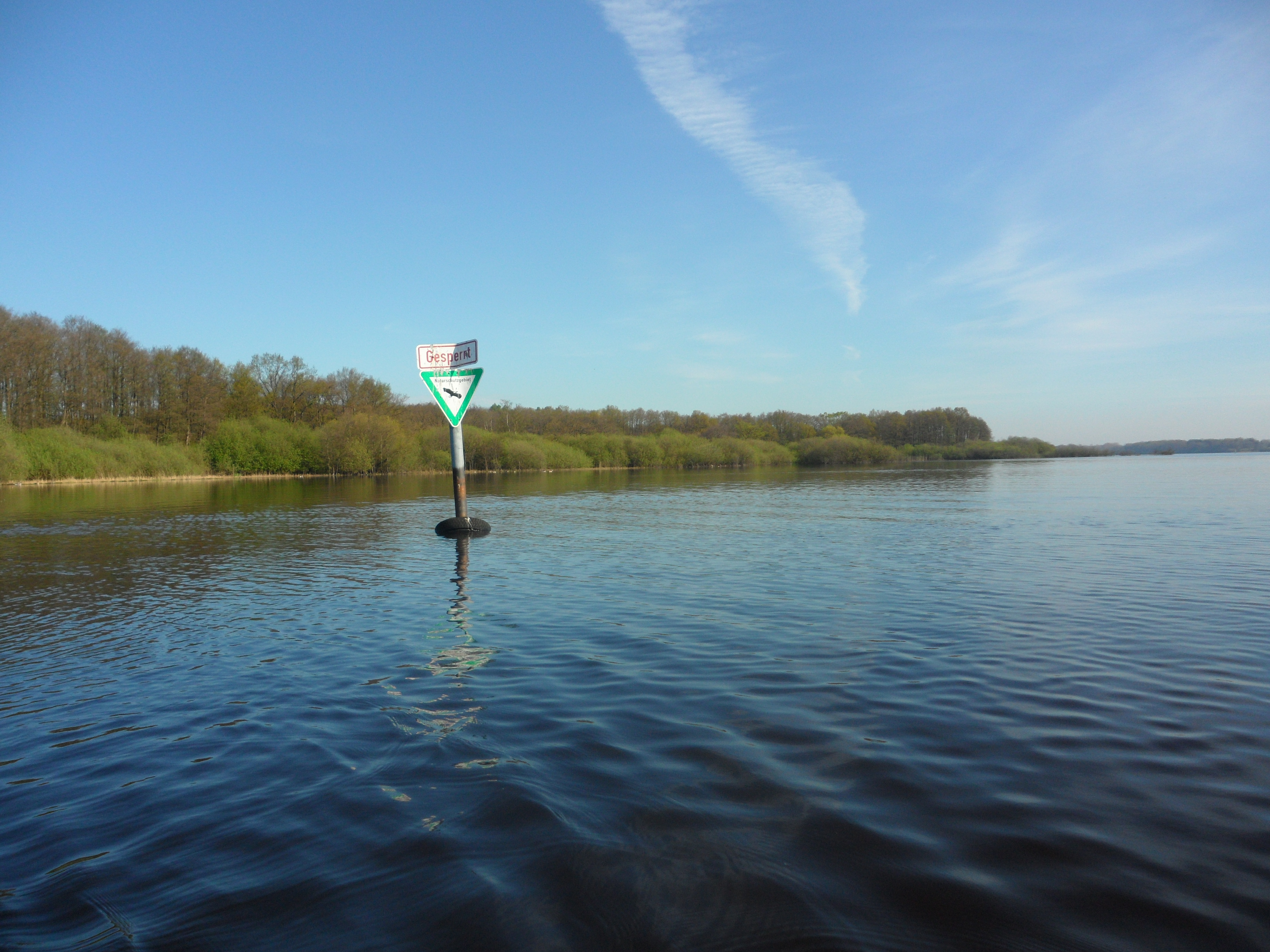
- Nature reserve on the west side of the lake

- Location within Schleswig-Holstein
- Location: Schleswig-Holstein
- Coordinates: 54°8′29″N 10°0′4″E
- Primary inflows: ditch from Dosenmoor
- Primary outflows: Aalbek (Stör)
- Basin countries: Germany
- Max. length: 3 km (1.9 mi)
- Max. width: 0.7 km (0.43 mi)
- Surface area: 1.78 km^{2} (0.69 sq mi)
- Average depth: 3.4 m (11 ft)
- Max. depth: 8.4 m (28 ft)
- Shore length^{1}: 8.7 km (5.4 mi)
- Surface elevation: 26.79 m (87.9 ft)
- Settlements: Neumünster
- ^{1} Shore length is not a well-defined measure.

Einfelder See is a lake in Schleswig-Holstein, Germany. At an elevation of 26.79 m, its surface area is 1.78 km^{2}. It is located in the northern suburb of Neumünster and in the Kreis Rendsburg-Eckernförde. The lake is located on a water divide of the rivers Stör and Eider. Most of the water originates from groundwater and precipitation, only a small portion reaches the lake from the adjacent Dosenmoor.

On the west side of the lake, the nature reserve Westufer Einfelder See is located. The east side offers beach regions, sunbathing areas and lake access for sailing and rowing boats.
