= Ann Christin von Allwörden =

German politician (born 1978)

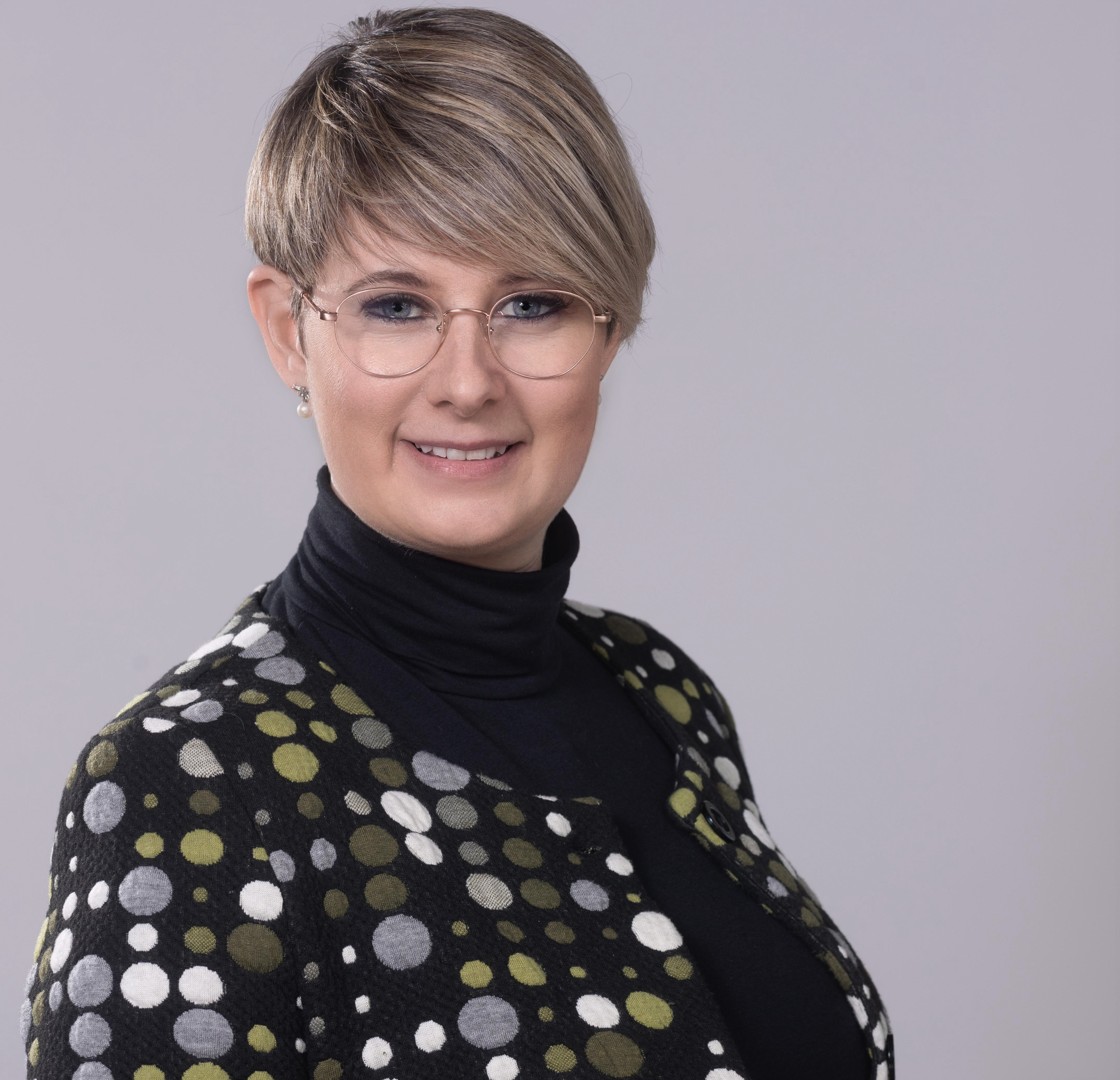
- von Allwörden in 2021

Member of the Landtag of Mecklenburg-Vorpommern
- Incumbent
- Assumed office 4 October 2016
- Preceded by: Detlef Lindner
- Constituency: Stralsund II (2016–2021)

Personal details
- Born: 24 October 1978 (age 47) Neumünster
- Party: Christian Democratic Union (since 1997)

Ann Christin von Allwörden (born 24 October 1978 in Neumünster) is a German politician serving as a member of the Landtag of Mecklenburg-Vorpommern since 2016. From 2000 to 2012, she worked as a police officer.
