= Christine Haderthauer =

German politician (born 1962)

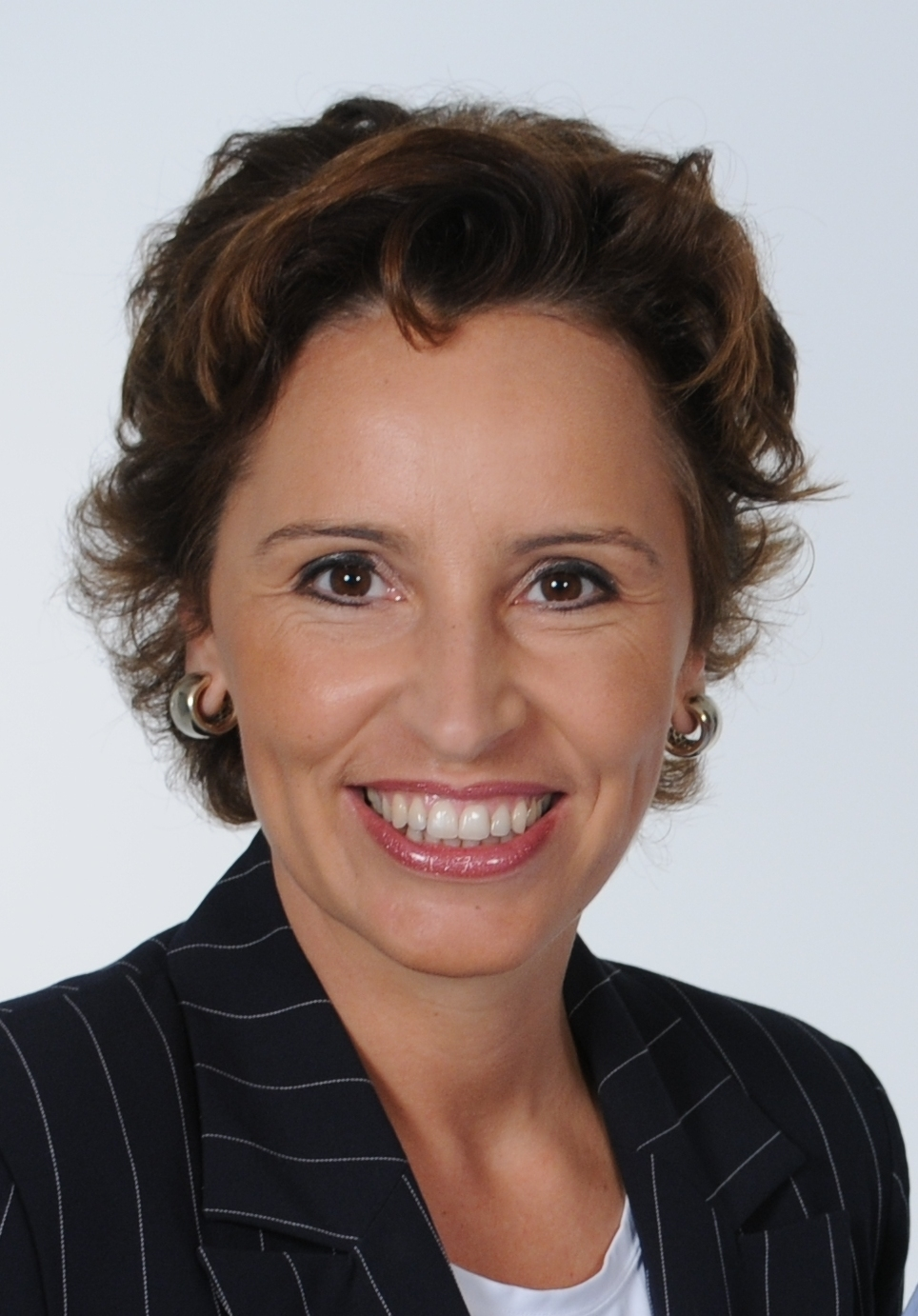
Christine Haderthauer (2008)

Christine Haderthauer (née Cuntze; born 11 November 1962) is a German politician and member of the Christian Social Union of Bavaria (CSU) party. She hold several ministerial positions in Bavaria.

Haderthauer was born in Neumünster.

In October 2007 she was elected Secretary General of the CSU. She was succeeded by Karl-Theodor zu Guttenberg in October 2008, as she became Bavarian State Minister for Labor, Social Affairs, Families and Women.

In 2013 she was appointed head of the Bayerische Staatskanzlei (Bavarian State Chancellery) as well as State Minister for Federal Affairs and Special Tasks.

She had to resign from office on 1 September 2014 because of the model car scandal in Bavaria.

Haderthauer was an MP of the Landtag, the parliament of Bavaria, from 2003 until 2018.

She is widowed and has one daughter and one son.
