= Neumünster =

- Town
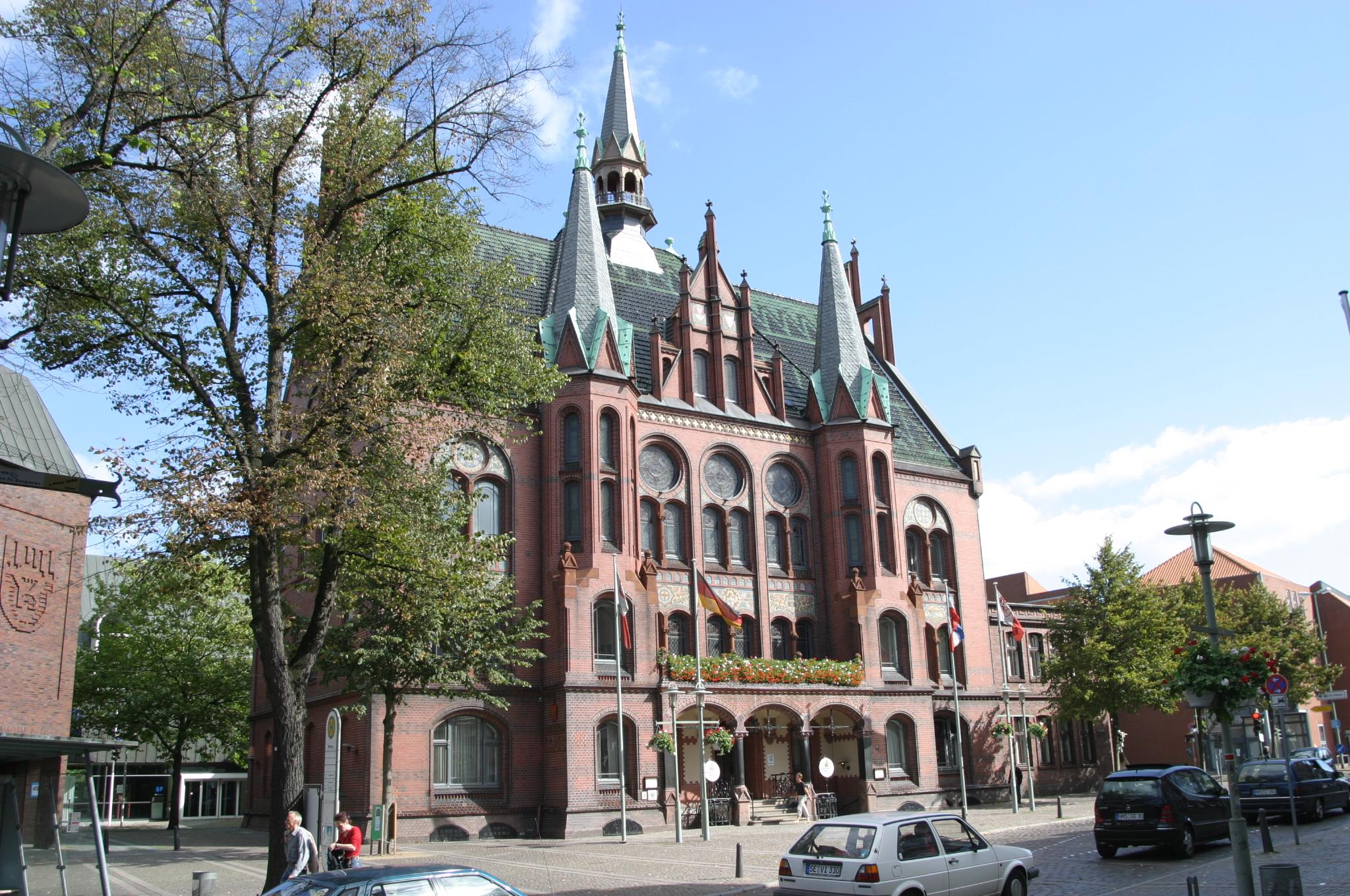
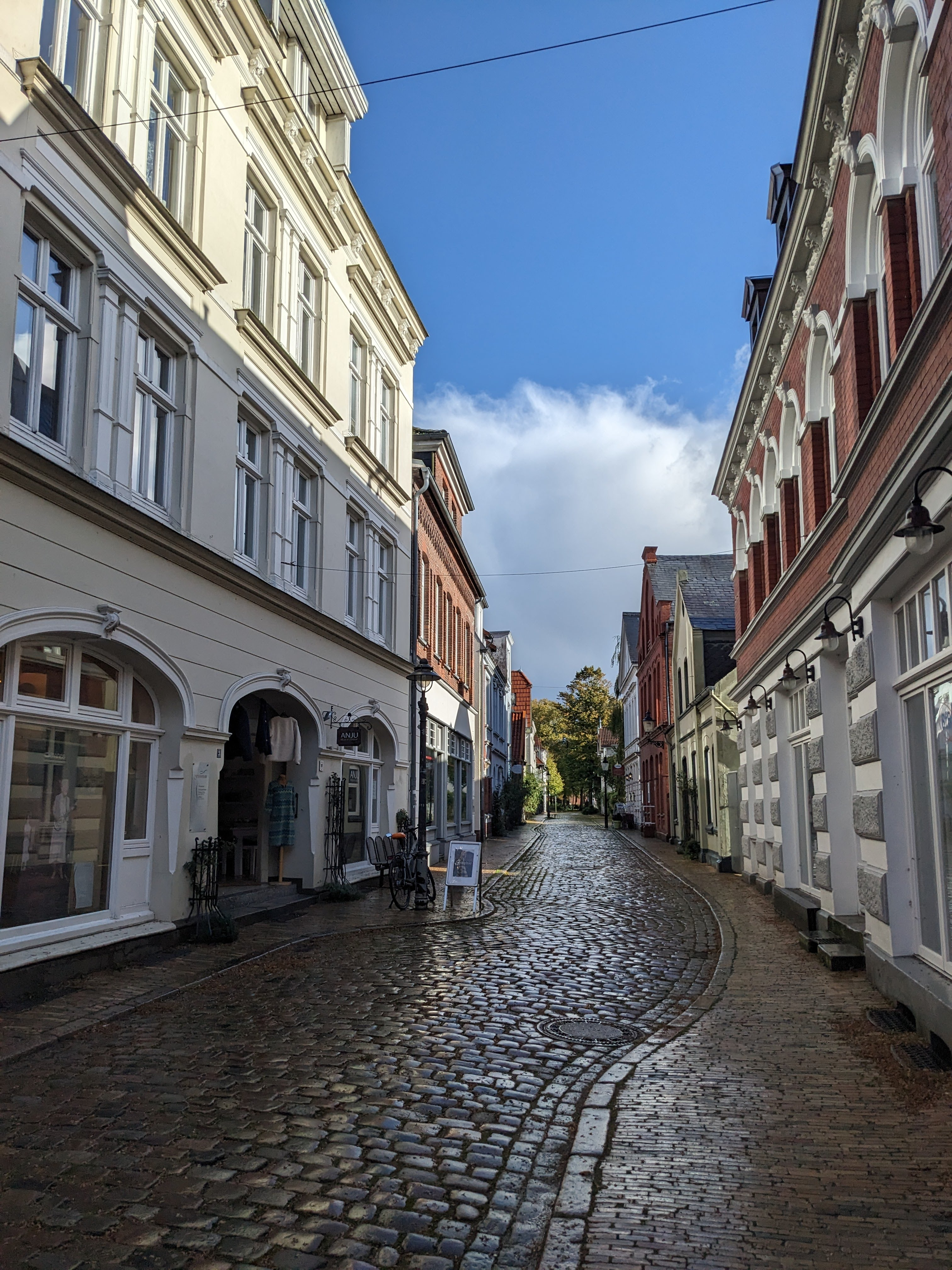
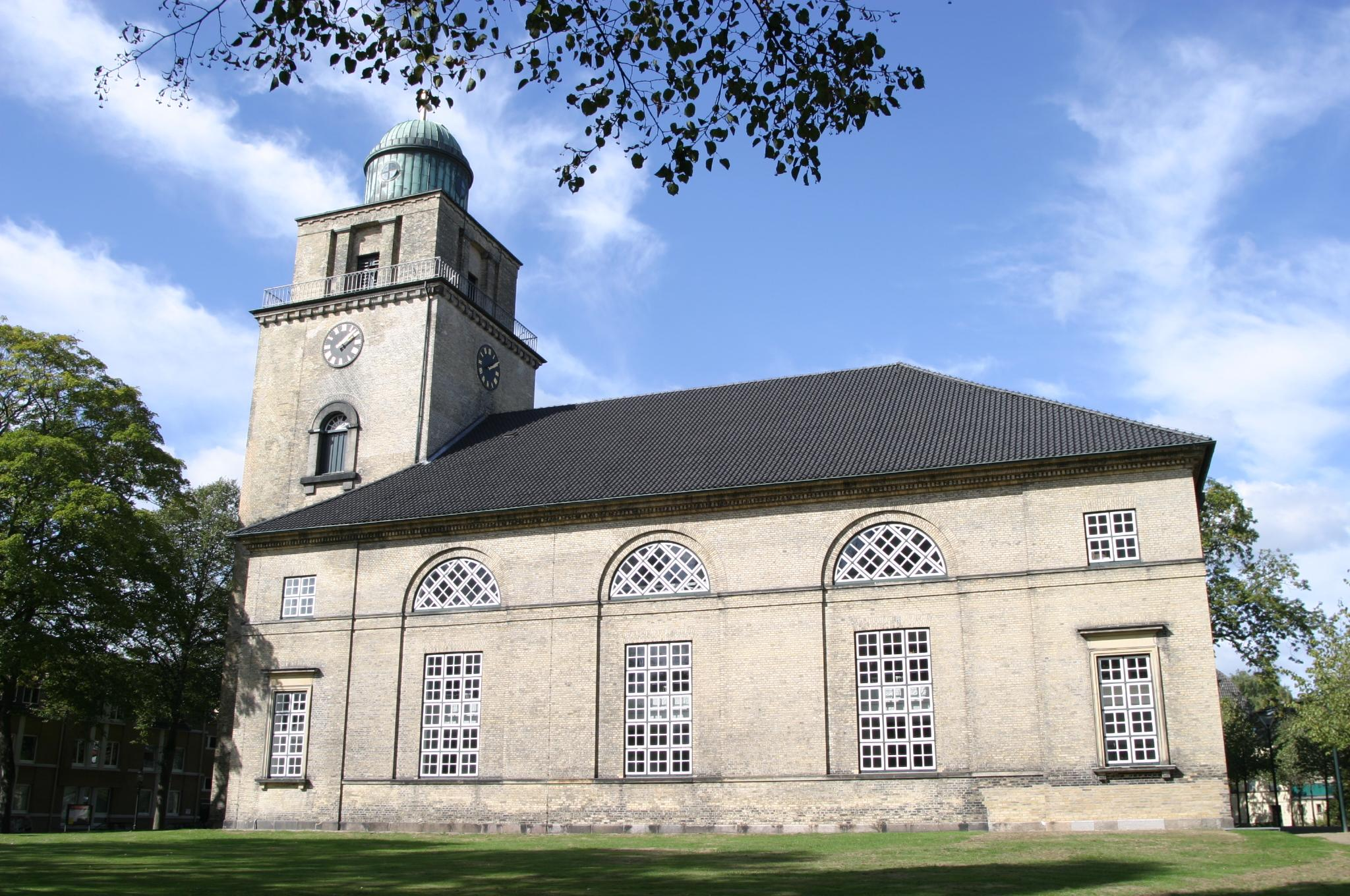
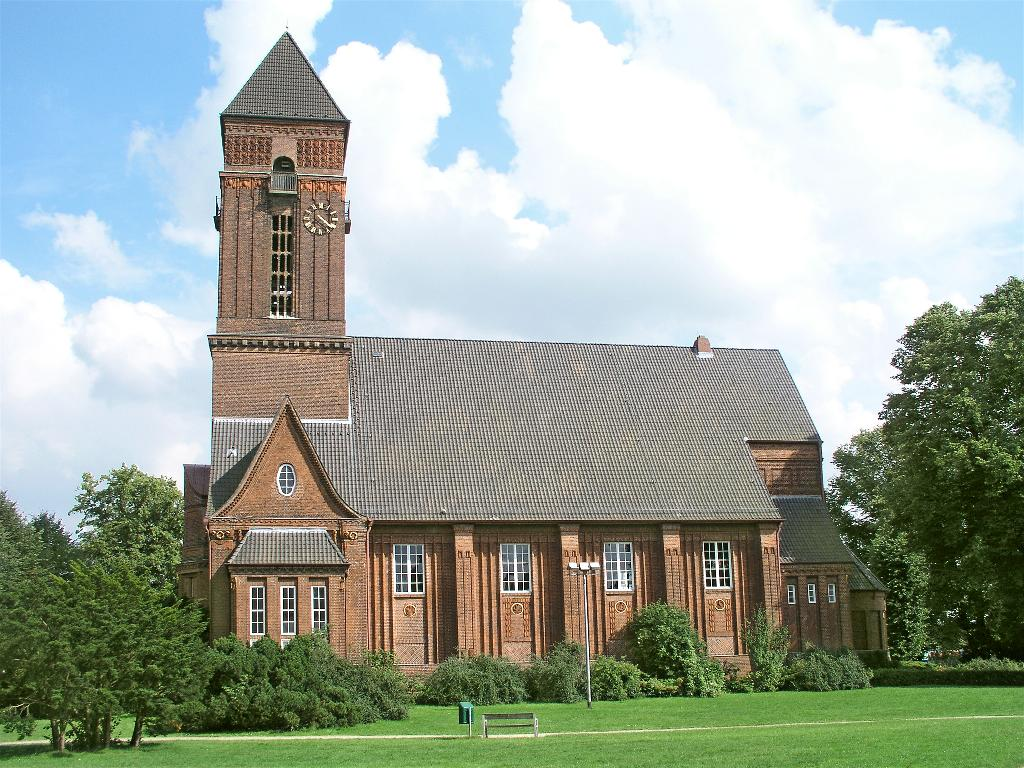
- City Hall Fürsthof Vicelin Church Anscharkirche

- Flag Coat of arms
- Interactive map of Neumünster
- Location within Germany Location within Schleswig-Holstein
- Coordinates: 54°04′17″N 09°59′24″E
- Country: Germany
- State: Schleswig-Holstein
- District: Urban district
- Subdivisions: 9 Stadtbezirke

Government
  - Mayor: Tobias Bergmann (SPD)

Area
  - Total: 71.66 km^{2} (27.67 sq mi)
- Elevation: 22 m (72 ft)

Population (2025-12-31)
  - Total: 80,145
  - Density: 1,118/km^{2} (2,897/sq mi)
- Time zone: UTC+01:00 (CET)
  - Summer (DST): UTC+02:00 (CEST)
- Postal codes: 24534 - 24539
- Dialling codes: 04321
- Vehicle registration: NMS
- Website: Official website

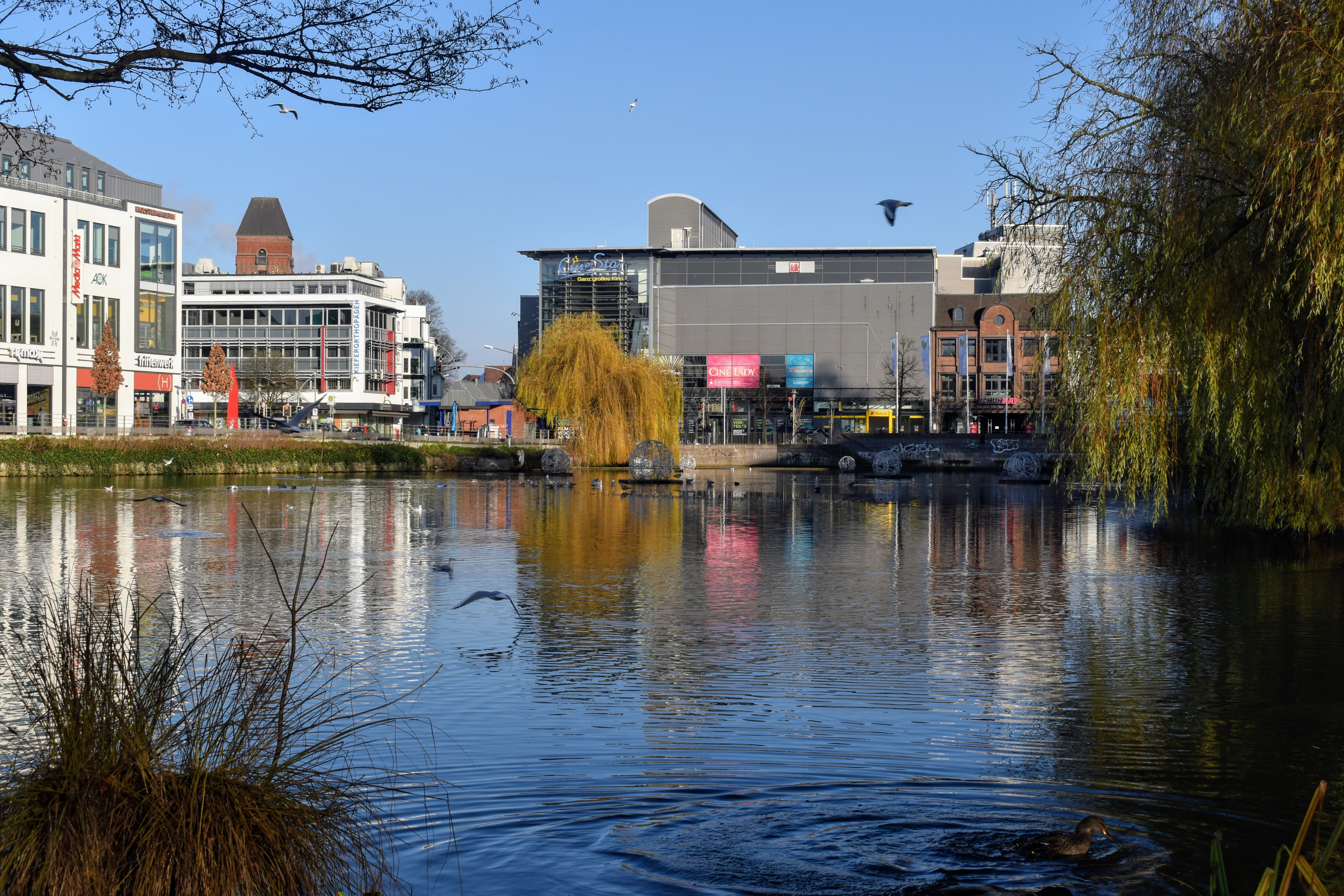
A view of the Neumünster pond in the city center, with the movie theater building ahead and the "Holsten-Gallery" mall on the left

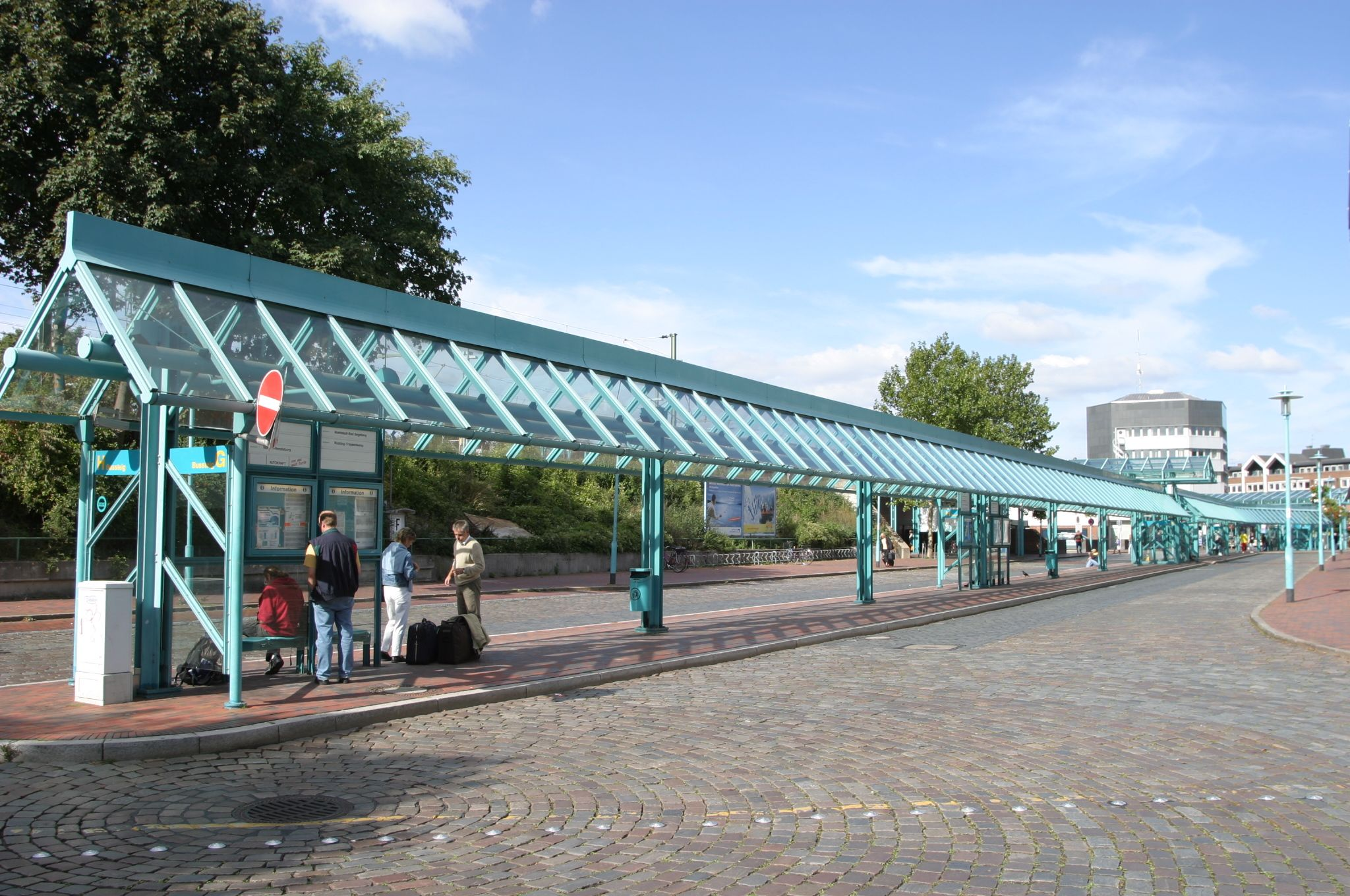
The central bus station at the central train station

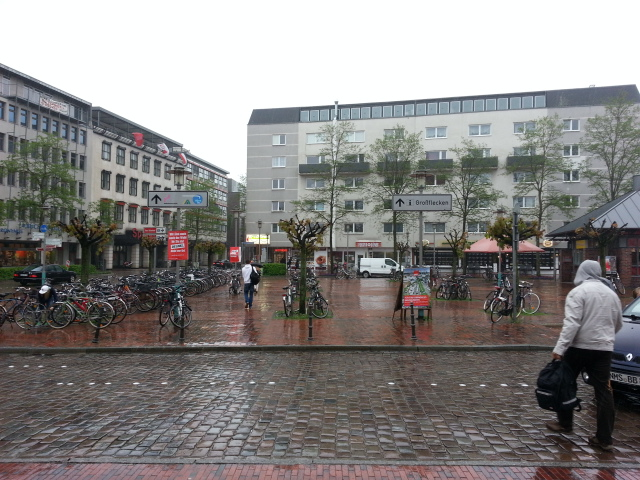
The "Konrad Adenauer Plaza" outside the central train station

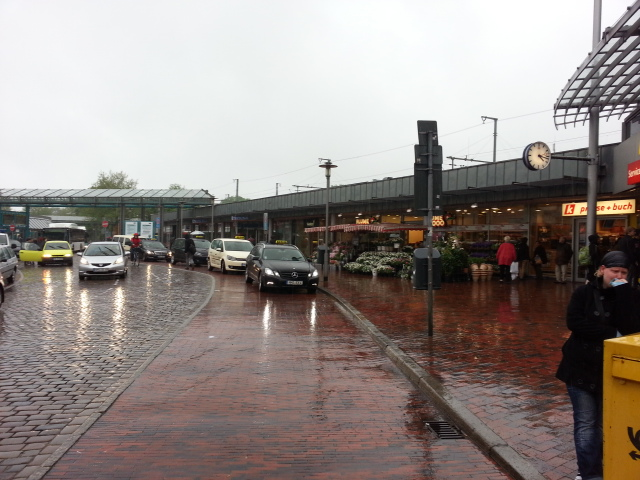
Outside of the entrance to the Neumünster central train station

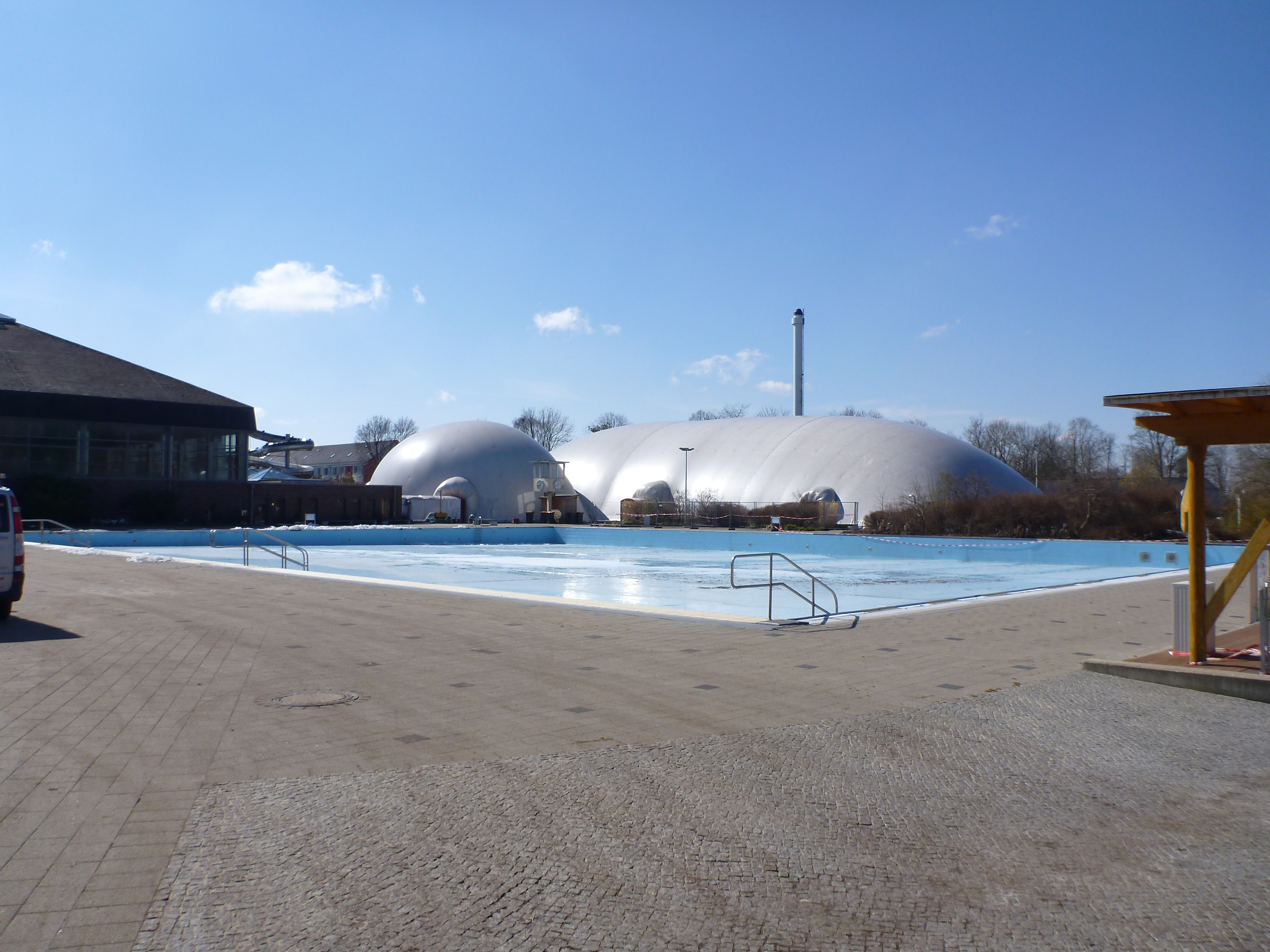
Neumünster's public outdoor swimming pool in the "Bad am Stadtwald", near the City's forest

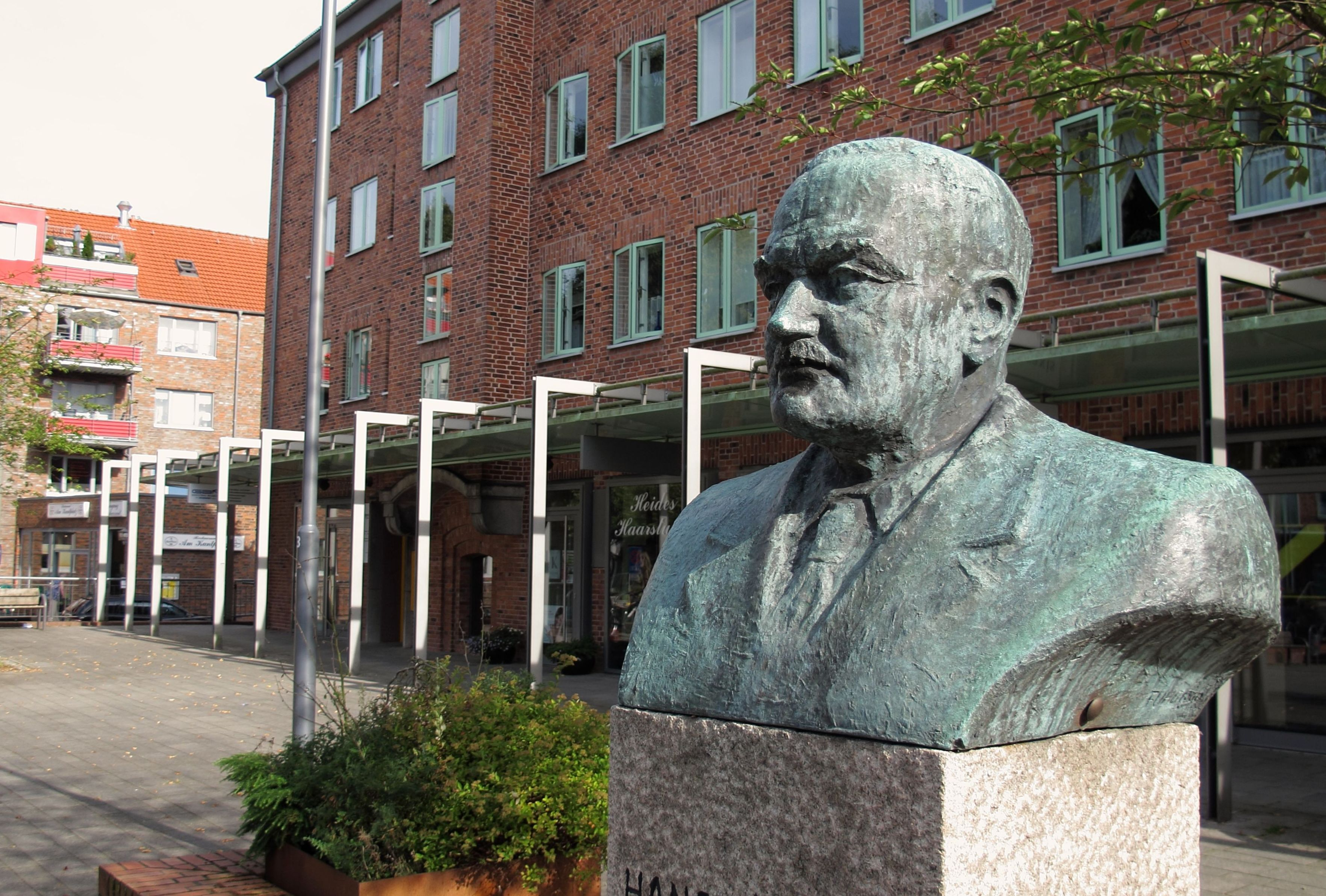
Bust of German politician Hans Böckler in the "Hans Böckler Settlement", a neighborhood of Neumünster

Neumünster (German pronunciation: [nɔʏˈmʏnstɐ]) is a city in the middle of Schleswig-Holstein, Germany. With more than 79,000 registered inhabitants, it is the fourth-largest municipality in Schleswig-Holstein (behind Kiel, Lübeck and Flensburg). The Holstenhallen and the Stadthalle make the city an important trade fair location.

== History ==
The city was first formally mentioned as Wippendorp im Gau Faldera in 1127. In that year, the Bishop Vicelinus was sent there by the Archbishop of Bremen to perform missionary work. By 1136, Vicelinus built a new monastery there (Latin: novum monasterium, Greco-Latin: Neomonasterium, German: neues Kloster or neues Münster). The name "Novum monasterium" eventually replaced the previous names of Wippendorf and Faldera and led to the current name.

In April 1870, Neumünster received town privileges. Since 1903 Neumünster is a so-called "independent city" (German: Kreisfreie Stadt) as it is not part of a district (German: Kreis).

Großflecken (English: Large spot), a large, centrally located street and public space in the city, became a place for civil unrest several times. In March 1848, riots broke out at Großflecken as part of the German revolution and again in 1923 during a period of inflation.

The city was criticized by the Rural People's Movement as part of a farmers' protest movement in northern Germany from 1928 to 1933, which was the basis for Hans Fallada's novel A Small Circus (Bauern, Bonzen und Bomben). The city's Hans Fallada Prize is named after him.

The Schleswig-Holstein Nazi Party was founded in 1925 by Hinrich Lohse. The local Nazi Party group of Neumünster met at Hofbräu München, a brewery at Großflecken. In 1926, Joseph Goebbels spoke to the local members there. In 1929 there were reportedly 29 members of the local Nazi Party group, but this number increased to 400 members a year later and to over 2,000 members by 1932. Shortly after the Nazi seizure of power, Großflecken was renamed to Adolf-Hitler-Platz (English: Adolf Hitler Place). On Kristallnacht in 1938, all Jewish men were arrested and sent to KZ Sachsenhausen.

During World War 2, Neumünster was bombed multiple times by Allied forces in 1945, partly because of its importance as a railway junction and industrial city. The British took control of the City in May 1945.

In the fall of 1946, the state of Schleswig-Holstein was founded and postwar Neumünster held its first municipal election.

Neumünster used to be a hub for the textile industry, with its first fulling mill going back to 1566. However, the industry eventually left the city due to competition from overseas and Neumünster's last cloth factory closed in the beginning of the 1990s. This, among other reasons, led to Neumünster having a relatively high rate of unemployment compared to nationwide averages.

In 2012, McArthurGlen Group opened a designer outlet shopping center in the industrial section of the city, using approximately 15,000 square meters.

== Current infrastructure ==
The city is divided into nine neighborhoods: Böcklersiedlung-Bugenhagen, Brachenfeld-Rutenberg, Einfeld, Faldera, Gadeland, Gartenstadt, Stadtmitte, Tungendorf and Wittorf.

Neumünster station is a major railway junction with lines running in six (formerly seven) directions, including the important Hamburg-Altona–Kiel and Neumünster–Flensburg lines.

Near Neumünster at Ehndorf, there is a high-power medium wave transmission facility for transmitting the programmes of Deutschlandfunk, the Ehndorf transmitter, which is often named incorrectly as "Neumünster transmitter".

The city has an airfield and a hospital. The utility company, "Stadtwerke Neumünster" (SWN), also manages local inter-city bus routes. In 2022, SWN ended all its inter-city bus service for Sundays and holidays, instead offering an on-demand shuttle van requiring an additional "comfort surcharge" on top of regular bus fares. Beginning in autumn 2023 more regular bus lines were replaced by the on-demand shuttle service. The additional fees were cancelled and the service can now be used with the normal bus tickets.

=== Education ===
The University of Applied Sciences Kiel offers a bachelor's degree in nursing at its Neumünster site.

== Geography ==
Neumünster is located at the rivers Schwale and Stör, near the geographical center of Schleswig-Holstein, 35 kilometres (22 mi) south of Kiel, 65 kilometres (40 mi) north of Hamburg and 72 kilometres (45 mi) west of Lübeck. The Aukrug Nature Park is close to the town.

== Culture and sightseeing ==
=== Museums and artists' house ===
The Museum Tuch + Technik shows the history of the cloth-making craft from the Iron Age to the present day as well as of the city of Neumünster. The museum, which is supported by the Foundation Museum, Art and Culture of the City of Neumünster, was reopened on October 13, 2007 with a revised exhibition in a specially constructed building.

The Herbert Gerisch Foundation is an art foundation established in 2001 by Brigitte and Herbert Gerisch and based in Neumünster-Brachenfeld. The foundation serves the care, promotion and presentation of regional as well as international contemporary art. At the same time as the foundation was established, an international sculpture park was continuously built up.

The Keramikkünstlerhaus Neumünster (until 2022 Stadttöpferei Neumünster) is an artists' house in Neumünster, which has been awarding work and residency scholarships for outstanding international graduates in the field of artistic ceramics since 1987. The Keramikkünstlerhaus is located in the Fürsthof, a small street in Neumünster's historic city center. The three-story brick building was built around 1900.

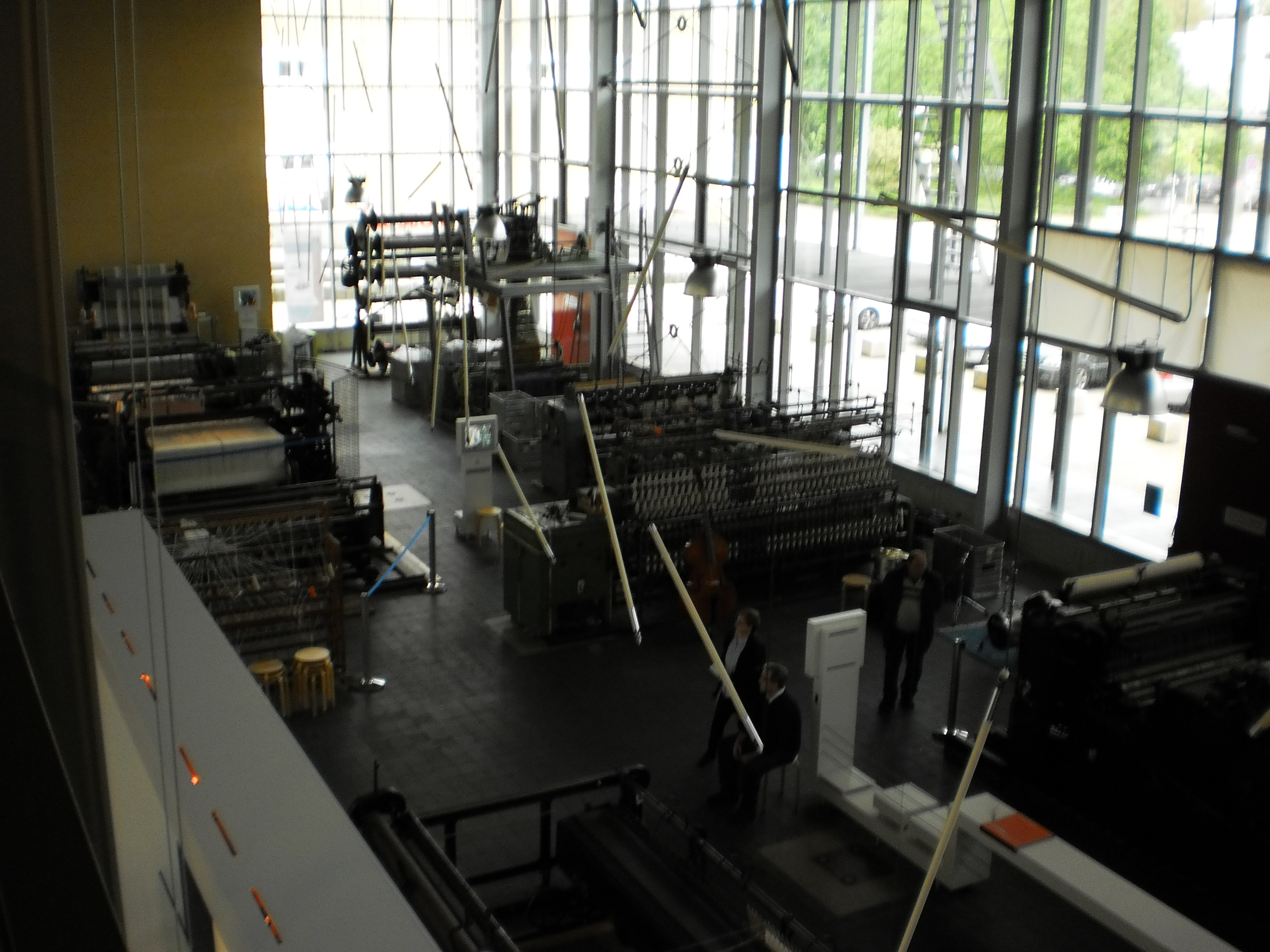
Museum Tuch + Technik in the city center

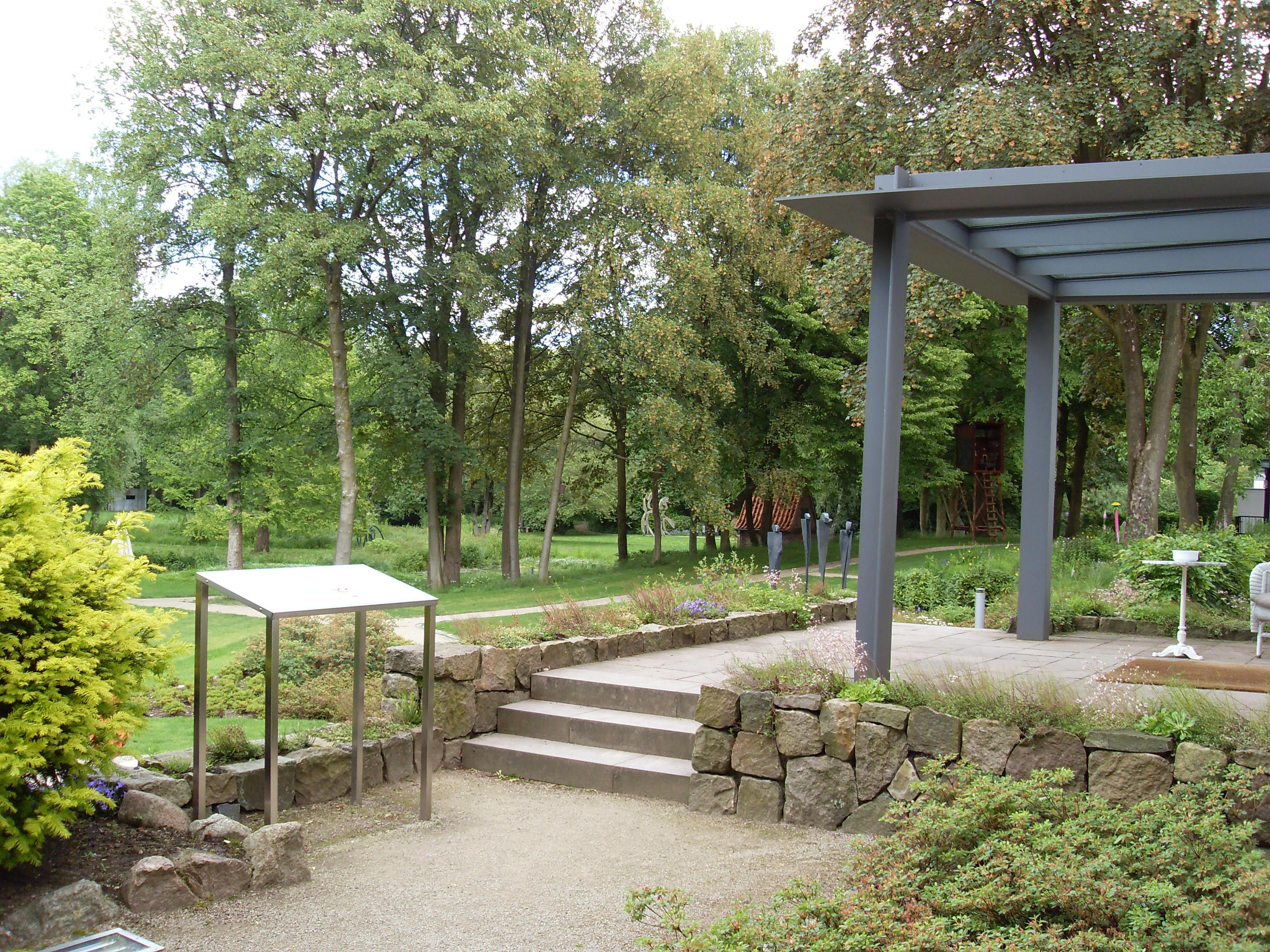
Gerisch sculpture park

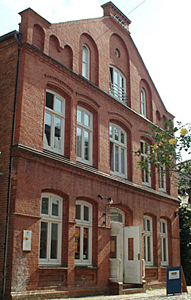
Keramikkünstlerhaus

=== Zoo ===
The Tierpark Neumünster houses about 700 animals from a total of 100 species of mammals, birds and reptiles on a wooded area of 24 hectares.

=== Nature reserves ===
The raised bog Dosenmoor near Einfeld northeast of Neumünster has an area of 521 hectares and is the largest and best preserved raised bog in Schleswig-Holstein. Due to the good condition of the moor, a diverse flora and fauna can be explored here.

The nature reserve on the western shore of Einfelder See protects the near-natural shoreline landscape with siltation zones and the open water areas in front of them.

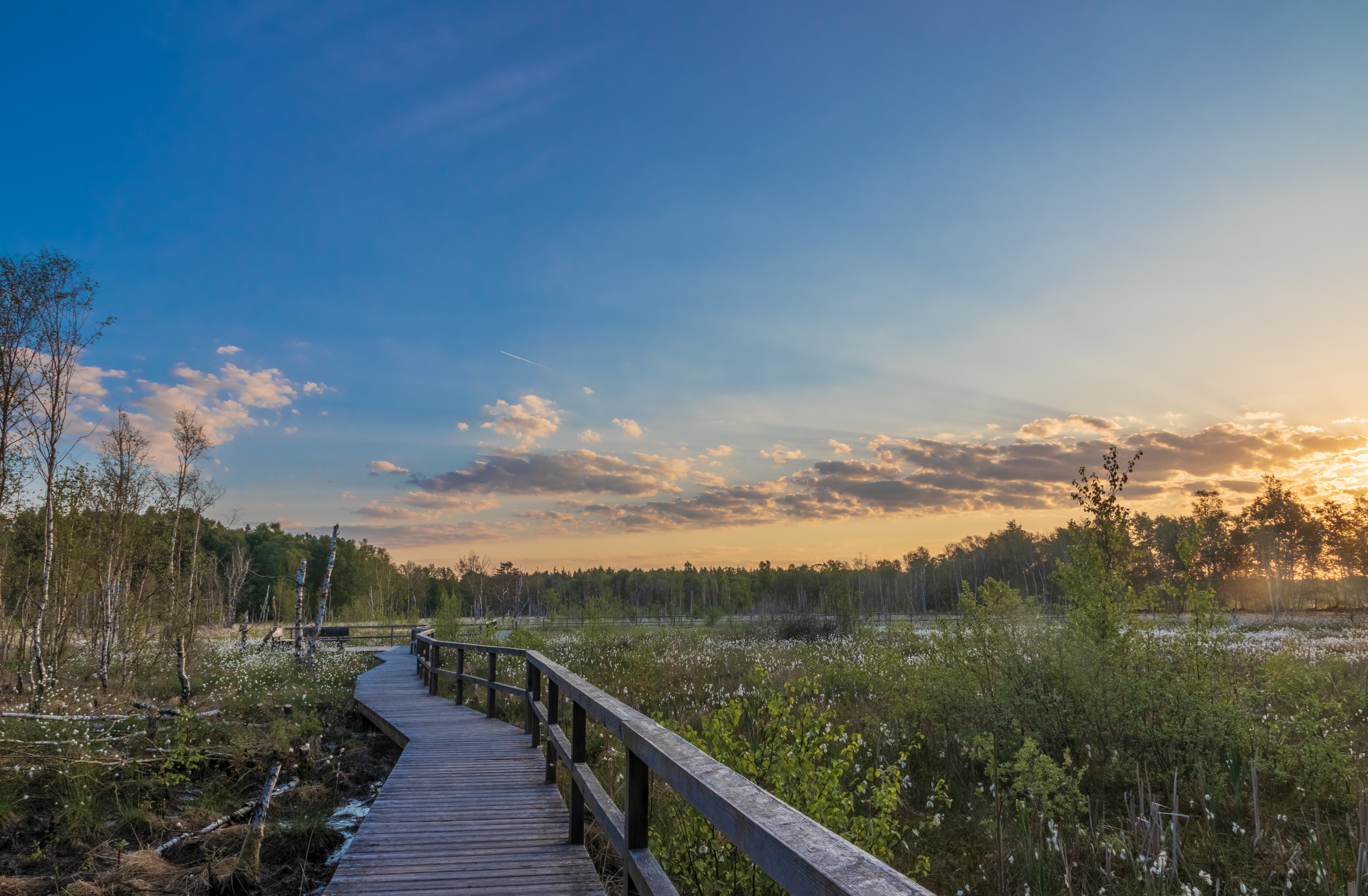
Dosenmoor

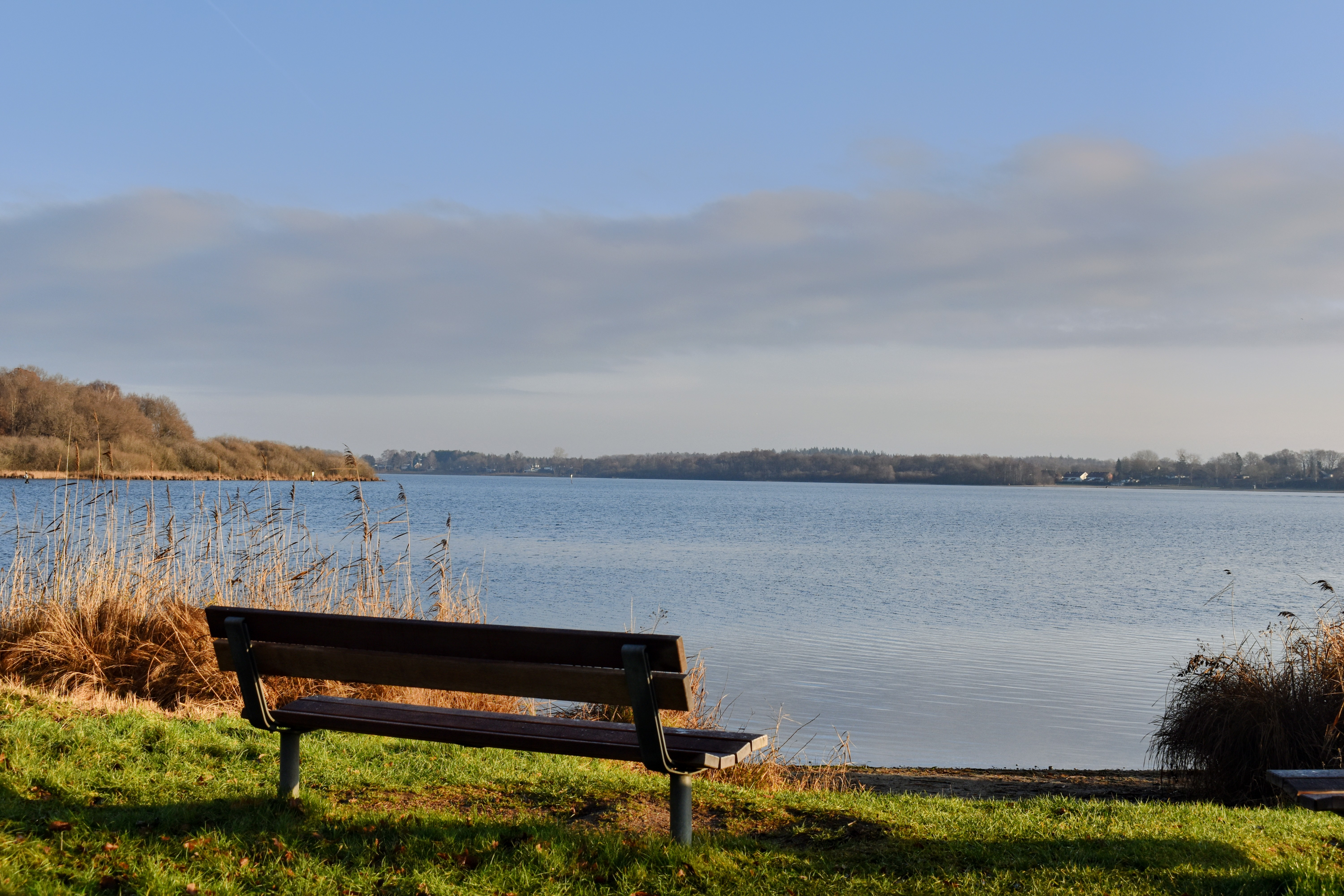
Einfelder See

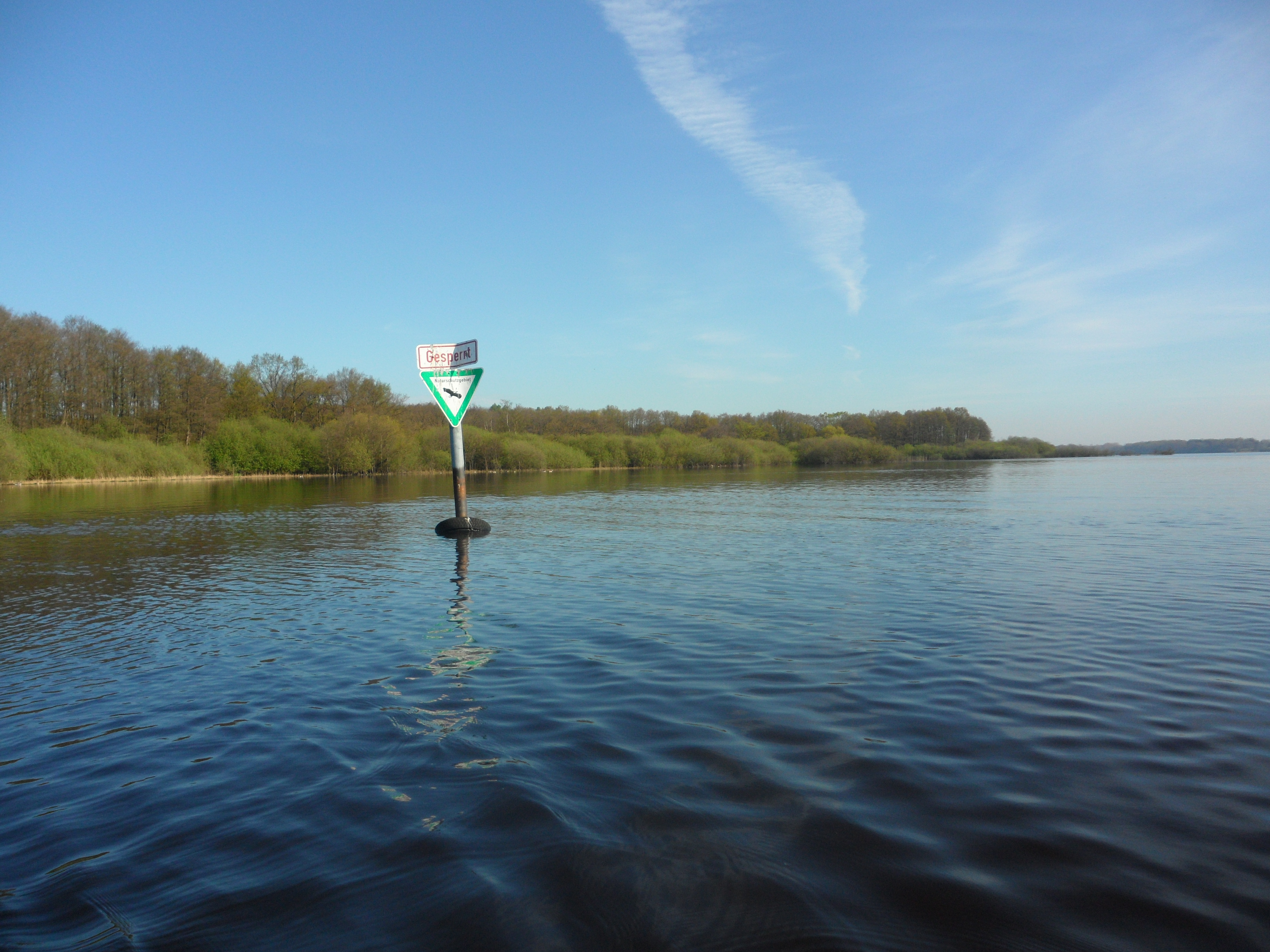
Einfelder See

== Politics ==
=== Mayor ===
The current mayor of Neumünster is Tobias Bergmann of the Social Democratic Party (SPD). The most recent mayoral election was held on 9 May 2021, with a runoff held on 30 May, and the results were as follows:

Candidate	Party	First round		Second round	
Candidate	Party	Votes	%	Votes	%
Olaf Tauras	Independent (CDU)	10,315	40.6	9,857	49.2
Tobias Bergmann	Social Democratic Party	6,834	26.9	10,194	50.8
Sven Radestock	Alliance 90/The Greens	5,649	22.3		
Memet Celik	Independent	1,799	7.1		
Mark Proch	National Democratic Party	786	3.1		
Valid votes		25,383	99.1	20,051	99.4
Invalid votes		233	0.9	112	0.6
Total		25,616	100.0	20,163	100.0
Electorate/voter turnout		64,345	39.8	64,344	31.3
Source: City of Neumünster (1st round, 2nd round)

==== List of mayors and Lord mayors ====
In 1870 Neumünster received the town privileges.

- 1870–1894: Eduard Schlichting
- 1894–1919: Max Röer
- 1919–1933: Detlef Schmidt
- 1933–1945: Max Stahmer (NSDAP (Nazi Party))
- 1945–1946: Gustav Bärwald (Oberstadtdirektor)
- 1946–1948: Ludolf Behnke (CDU)
- 1948–1950: Hugo Voß (SPD)
- 1950–1970: Walther Lehmkuhl (SPD)
- 1970–1988: Uwe Harder (SPD)
- 1988–1991: Franz-Josef Pröpper (SPD)
- 1991–2009: Hartmut Unterlehberg (SPD)
- 2009–2021: Olaf Tauras (CDU)
- 2021–present: Tobias Bergmann (SPD)

=== City council ===
The Neumünster city council governs the city alongside the Mayor. The most recent city council election was held on 6 May 2018, and the results were as follows:

Party	Votes	%	±	Seats	±
Christian Democratic Union (CDU)	7,665	34.0	▼2.5	15	▼1
Social Democratic Party (SPD)	6,163	27.4	▼6.6	12	▼2
Alliance 90/The Greens (Grüne)	3,686	16.4	▲3.9	7	▲2
Free Democratic Party (FDP)	1,318	5.9	▲1.7	2	▼1
Alliance for Citizens in Schleswig-Holstein (BfB)	1,293	5.7	▼0.4	2	±0
The Left (Die Linke)	959	4.3	▲1.3	2	▲1
National Democratic Party (NPD)	879	3.9	▲2.3	2	▲1
Liberal Conservative Reformers (LKR)	440	2.0	New	1	New
Pirate Party Germany (Piraten)	120	0.5	▼1.5	0	▼1
Valid votes	22,523	98.8			
Invalid votes	263	1.2			
Total	22,786	100.0		43	±0
Electorate/voter turnout	64,839	35.1	▼4.7		
Source: City of Neumünster

== Population development ==
Year	Total population	German citizens #	German citizens %	Other citizens #	Other citizens %
1803	2,588				
1835	3,732				
1871	8,628				
1875	10,100				
1880	11,600				
1885	13,659				
1890	17,539				
1895	22,489				
1900	27,335				
1905	31,439				
1910	34,555				
1916	31,658				
1917	31,034				
1919	36,173				
1925	39,844				
1933	40,332				
1939	54,094				
1945	57,473				
1946	66,185				
1950	73,481				
1956	72,134				
1961	75,045				
1965	74,542				
1970	86,013				
1975	84,777				
1980	80,145				
1985	78,280				
1987	79,771				
1990	80,743				
1995	82,028				
2000	79,831	73,959	92,6 %	5,872	7,4 %
2001	79,646	73,934	92,8 %	5,712	7,2 %
2002	79,544	73,945	93,0 %	5,599	7,0 %
2003	78,951	73,370	92,9 %	5,581	7,1 %
2004	78,555	73,086	93,0 %	5,469	7,0 %
2005	78,072	72,711	93,1 %	5,361	6,9 %
2006	77,936	72,493	93,0 %	5,443	7,0 %
2007	77,595	72,300	93,2 %	5,295	6,8 %
2008	77,100	72,291	93,8 %	4,809	6,2 %
2009	76,897	72,124	93,8 %	4,773	6,2 %
2010	76,830	72,087	93,8 %	4,743	6,2 %
2011	77,201	72,492	93,9 %	4,709	6,1 %
2012	76,951	72,437	94,1 %	4,514	5,9 %
2013	77,058	72,370	93,9 %	4,688	6,1 %
2014	77,588	72,107	92,9 %	5,481	7,1 %
2015	79,197	71,786	90,6 %	7,411	9,4 %
2016	79,680	71,182	89,3 %	8,498	10,7 %
2017	79,335	70,602	89,0 %	8,733	11,0 %
2018	79,487	70,271	88,4 %	9,216	11,6 %
2019	80,196	69,976	87,3 %	10,220	12,7 %
2020	79,905	69,382	86,8 %	10,523	13,2 %
2021	79,496	68,760	86,5 %	10,736	13,5 %
2022	79,502	68,251	85,6%	11,251	14,2%
2023	80,185	67,745	84,5%	12,440	15,5%

== Twin towns – sister cities ==
Neumünster is twinned with:

- Gravesham, England, United Kingdom
- Koszalin, Poland
- Parchim, Germany

== Sport ==
The 10,000 capacity Grümmi-Arena (formerly the VfR-Stadion an der Geerdtsstraße), built in 1927, is the home ground of the football team known as VfR Neumünster. The stadium once hosted a motorcycle speedway and Team 70 Neumünster (founded in 1970) were the first champions of West Germany in 1973.

=== Sportspeople ===
- Wilf Smith (born 1946), English footballer
- Werner Bühse (born 1951), sports shooter
- Svenja Schlicht (born 1967), swimmer
- Dirk Urban (born 1969), shot putter
- Stefan Schnoor (born 1971), footballer
- Gabriel Silberstein (born 1974), Chilean tennis player
- Mona Barthel (born 1990), tennis player
- Norick Blödorn (born 2004), speedway rider

== Notable people ==
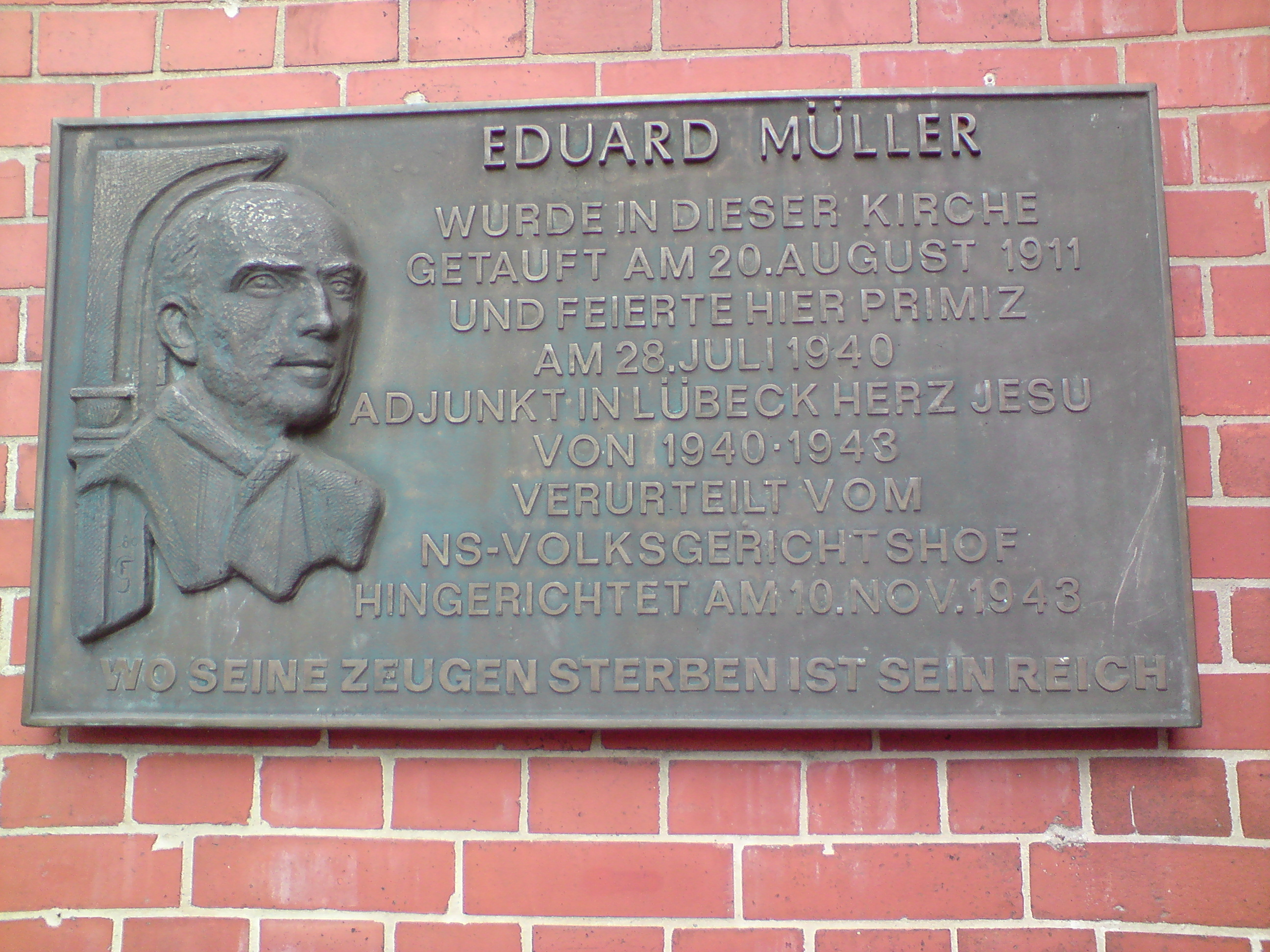
Memorial plate Eduard Müller in Neumünster

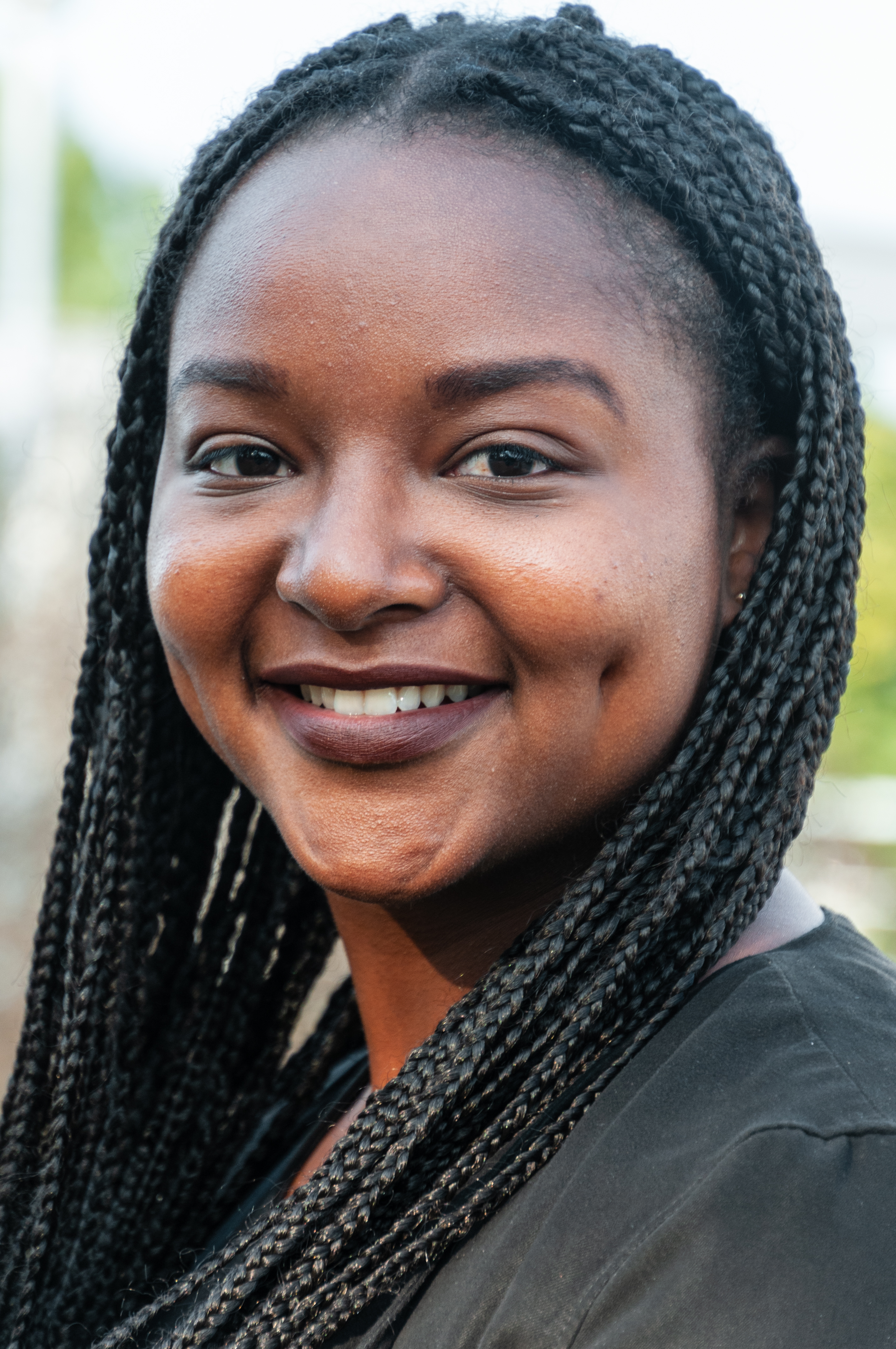
Aminata Touré

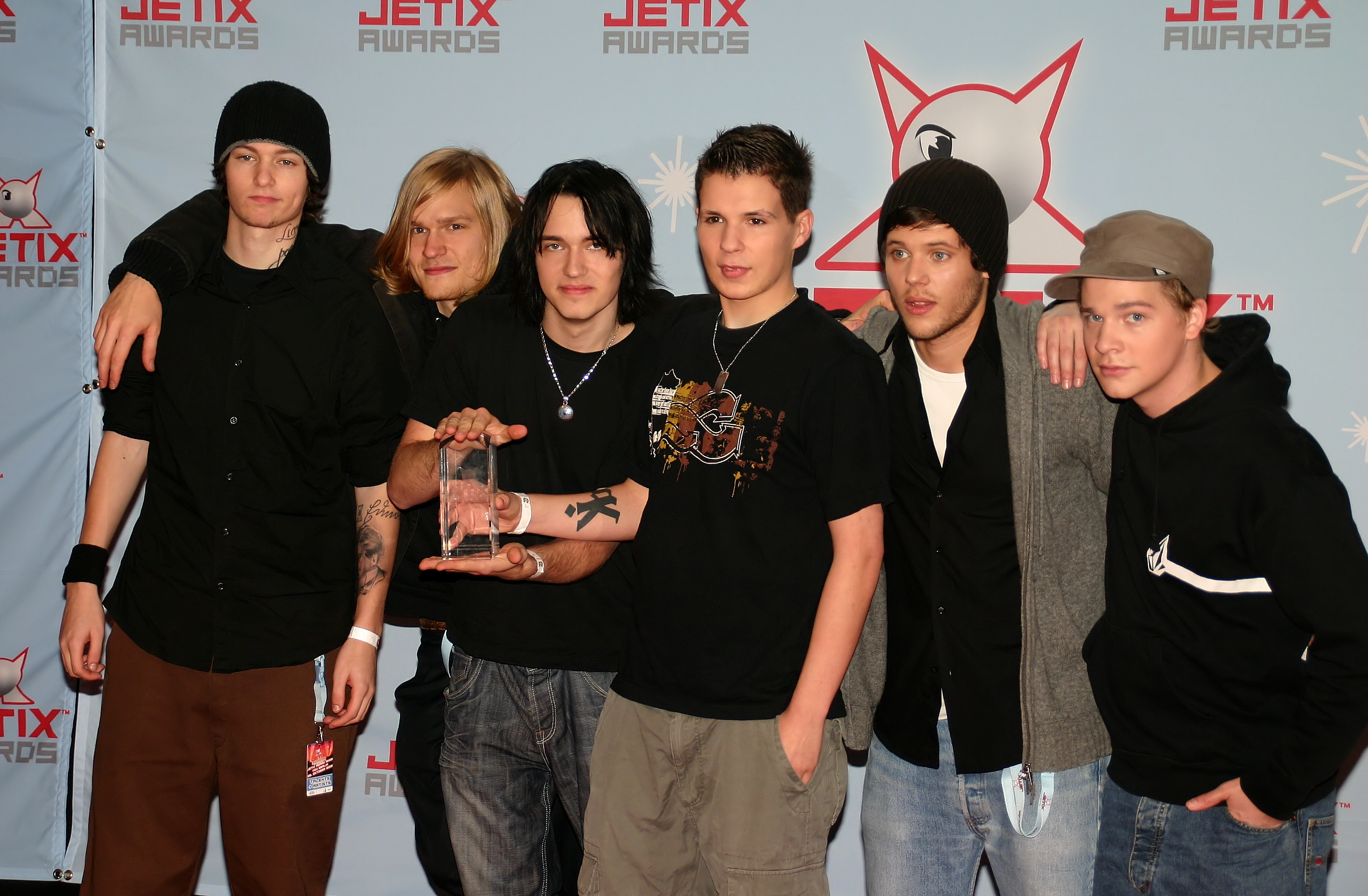
Panik in 2008

- Vicelinus (1086–1154), Apostle of Holstein and Bishop of Oldenburg
- Ernst Eduard Hudemann (1811–1889), educator, philologist and classical historian
- Eduard Sachau (1845–1930), orientalist
- Rudolf Bülck (1880−1954), librarian
- Karl Schlabow (1891–1984), archaeologist, museum director and conservator
- Walter Bartram (1893–1971), former Minister President of Schleswig-Holstein
- Hans Schnoor (1893–1976), musicologist
- Fritz C. Mauch (1905–1940), film editor and assistant director
- Eduard Müller (1911–1943), Catholic priest, one of the Lübeck martyrs
- Herbert Martin Hagen (1913–1999), SS Stormbolder and convicted war criminal
- Annemarie Auer (1913–2002), author and literary scholar
- Gerhard Wessel (1913–2002), President of the Federal Intelligence Bureau 1968–1978
- Horst Mittelstaedt (1923–2016), biologist cyberneticist and university lecturer
- Detlev Blanke (1941–2016), University lecturer for interlinguistics at the Humboldt-Universität Berlin
- Michael Simon (born 1958), theatre director, opera director and scenic designer
- Thomas Mohr (tenor) (born 1961), tenor and academic teacher
- Christine Haderthauer (born 1962), former CSU General Secretary and former Minister of State (Bavarian State Ministry of Labor and Social Affairs, Family and Women)
- Ann Christin von Allwörden (born 1978), politician (CDU)
- Aminata Touré (born 1992), German Green Party politician, member and former Vice-President of the Schleswig-Holstein Landtag and current Minister of Social Affairs, Youth, Family, Senior Citizens, Integration and Equality of Schleswig-Holstein

== See also ==
- VfR Neumünster
- Hans Fallada Prize
- Einfelder See
