= Friedrich Lübker =

German educator and philologist (1811–1867)

Friedrich Heinrich Christian Lübker (18 August 1811, Husum – 10 October 1867, Flensburg) was a German educator and philologist.

He studied philology and theology at the University of Kiel, receiving his doctorate in 1832. In 1835 he was named school conrector in Schleswig, and in 1848 was appointed rector of the provisional government school in Flensburg, In 1851 he relocated to Parchim as director of its high school (gymnasium). Later he moved to Braunschweig in order to spend time pursuing literary interests. In 1864 he returned to Flensburg, where he was tasked with reorganization of its high school system.

== Literary efforts ==
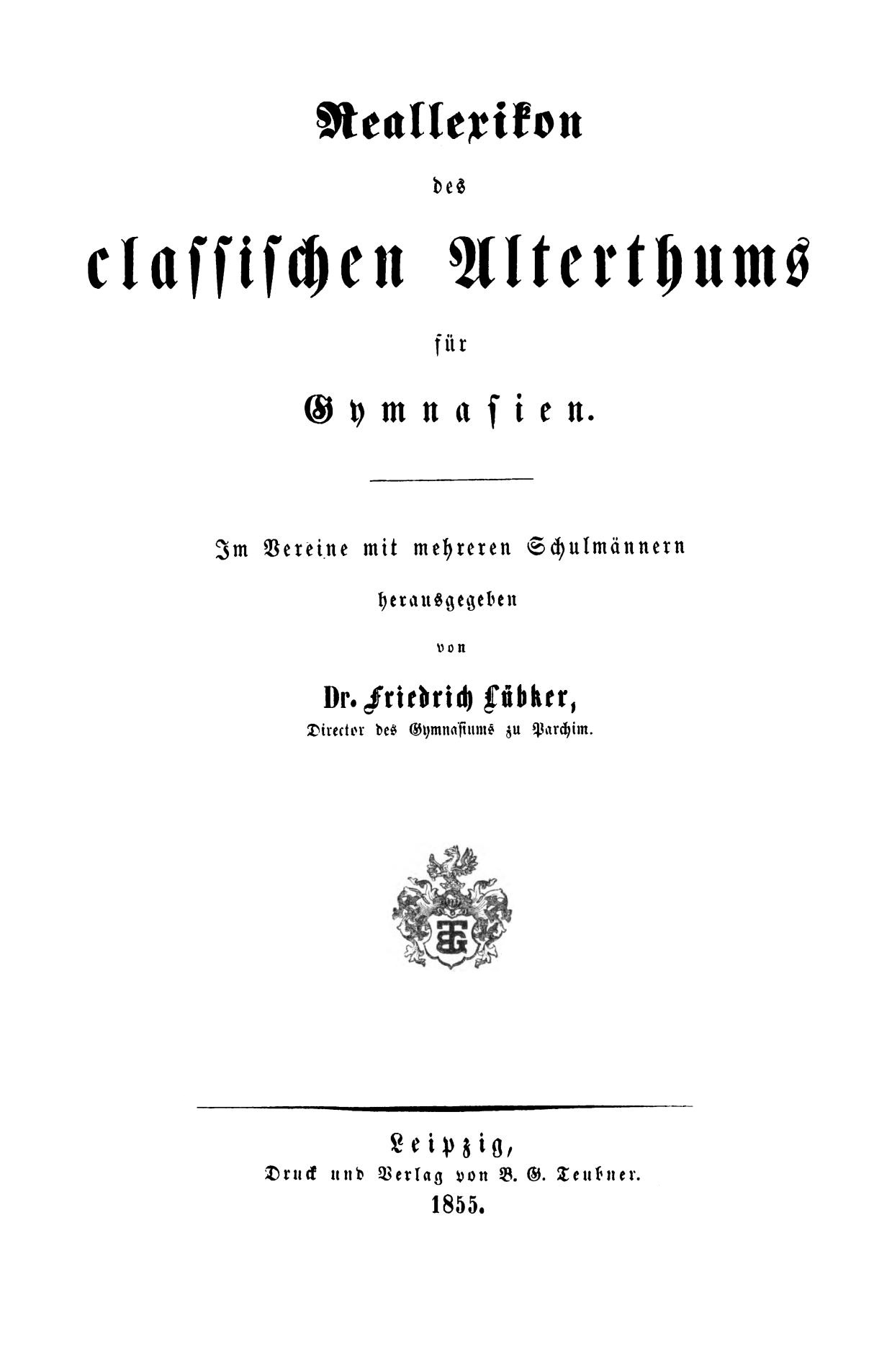
Title page of Lübker's "Reallexikon des classischen Alterthums für Gymnasien" (1855).

He was the author of many works, including a popular dictionary of classical antiquity that was issued in numerous editions spanning several decades. He was also published a number of biographical works on various theological figures — Rhabanus Maurus, Alcuin, the martyrs victimized by Nero, Dionysius Areopagita, Hugo Grotius, to name a few. The following are a list of his principal works:

- Die Sophokleische Theologie und Ethik, 1851-1855 - Sophoclean theology and ethics.
- Gesammelte schriften zur philologie und paedagogik, 1852 - Collected papers on philology and pedagogy.
- Reallexikon des classischen Alterthums für Gymnasien, (22 editions published between 1855 and 1914).
- Handwörterbuch der lateinischen Sprache, (Reinhold Klotz, with Lübker and Ernst Eduard Hudemann; six editions published between 1857 and 1879) - Dictionary of the Latin language.
- Beiträge zur Theologie und Ethik des Euripides, 1863 - Contributions to the theology and ethics of Euripides.
- Vorträge über Bildung und Christenthum, 1863 - Lectures on education and Christianity.
