= Dosenmoor =

Coordinates: 54°7′54″N 10°1′10″E

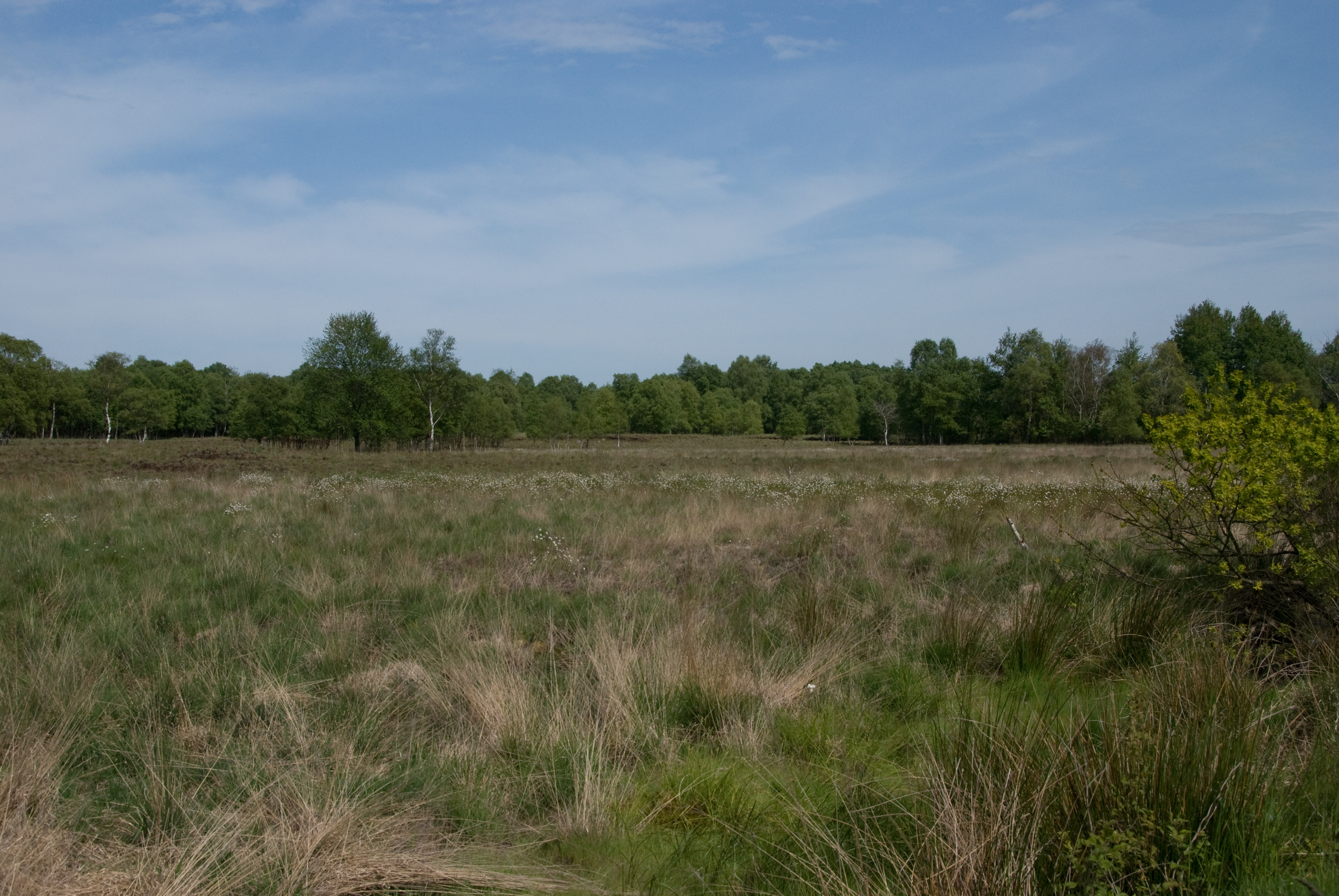
View over a largely treeless area of the Dosenmoor

The Dosenmoor is a regenerative and, in places, preserved raised bog in the north German state of Schleswig-Holstein. It lies near the town of Neumünster east of the village of Einfeld and covers an area of 521 hectares. The almost circular bog lies on the watershed between the River Eider, which flows northwards, and the Stör, which flows towards the south.

== Vegetation ==
The bog, which has been used for centuries, no longer exhibits the typical character of a living raised bog over much of its area. Only in some areas are there the remnants of peat moss, cottongrass and cross-leaved heathland and bog-rosemary. Secondary vegetation of ling (Calluna vulgaris), crowberry (Empetrum nigrum) und purple moor-grass (Molinia caerulea) are widespread.

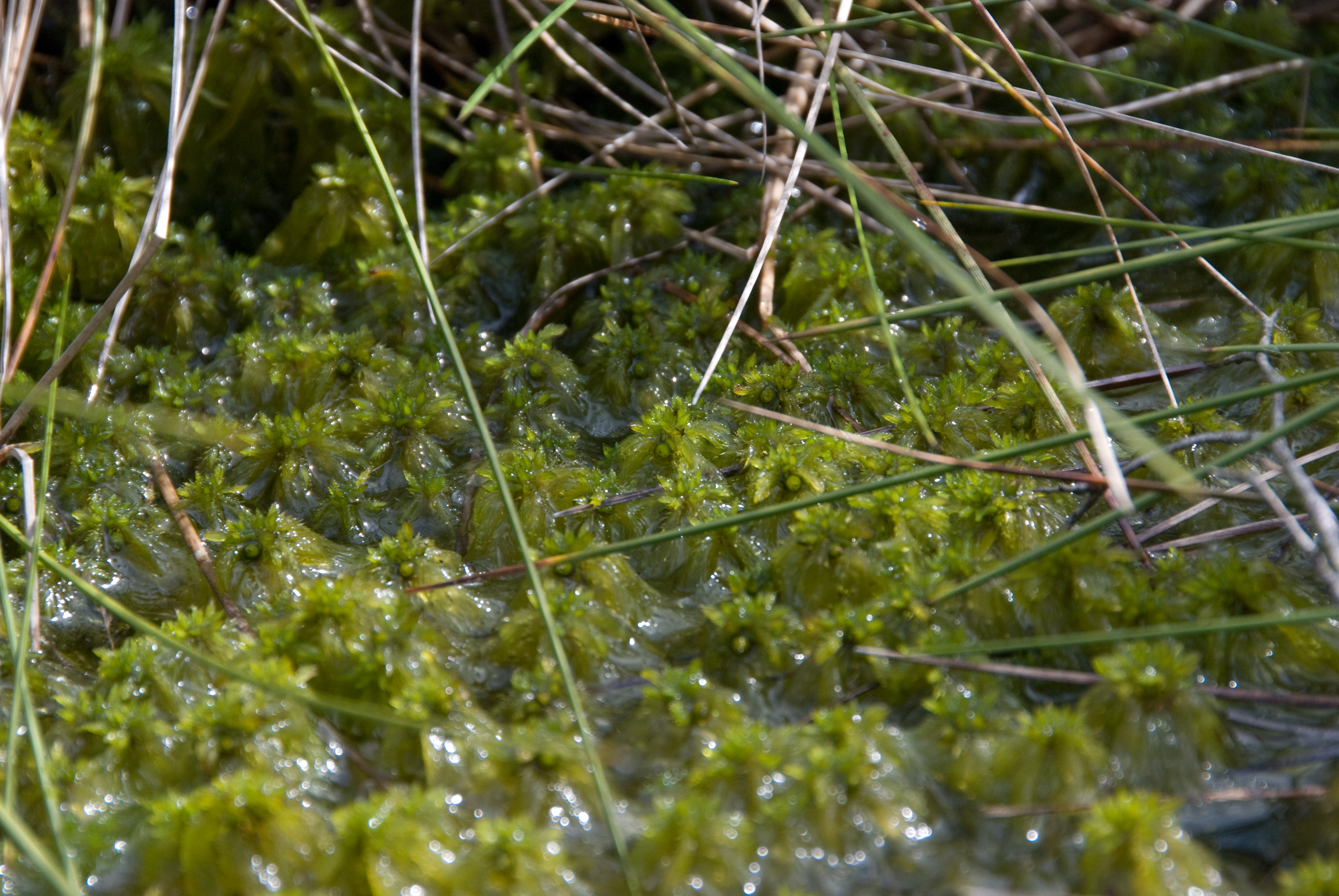
Peat moss

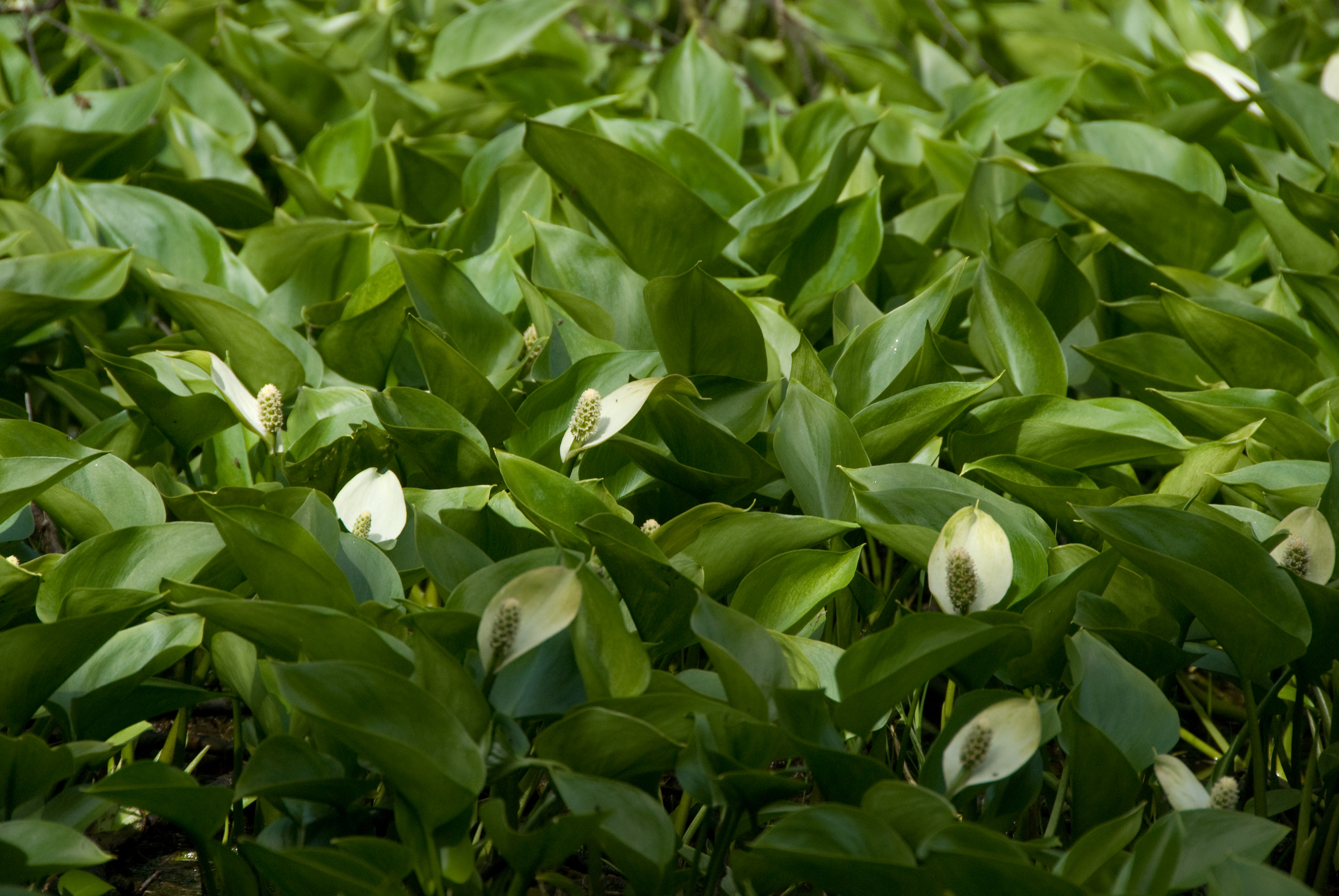
Bog arum

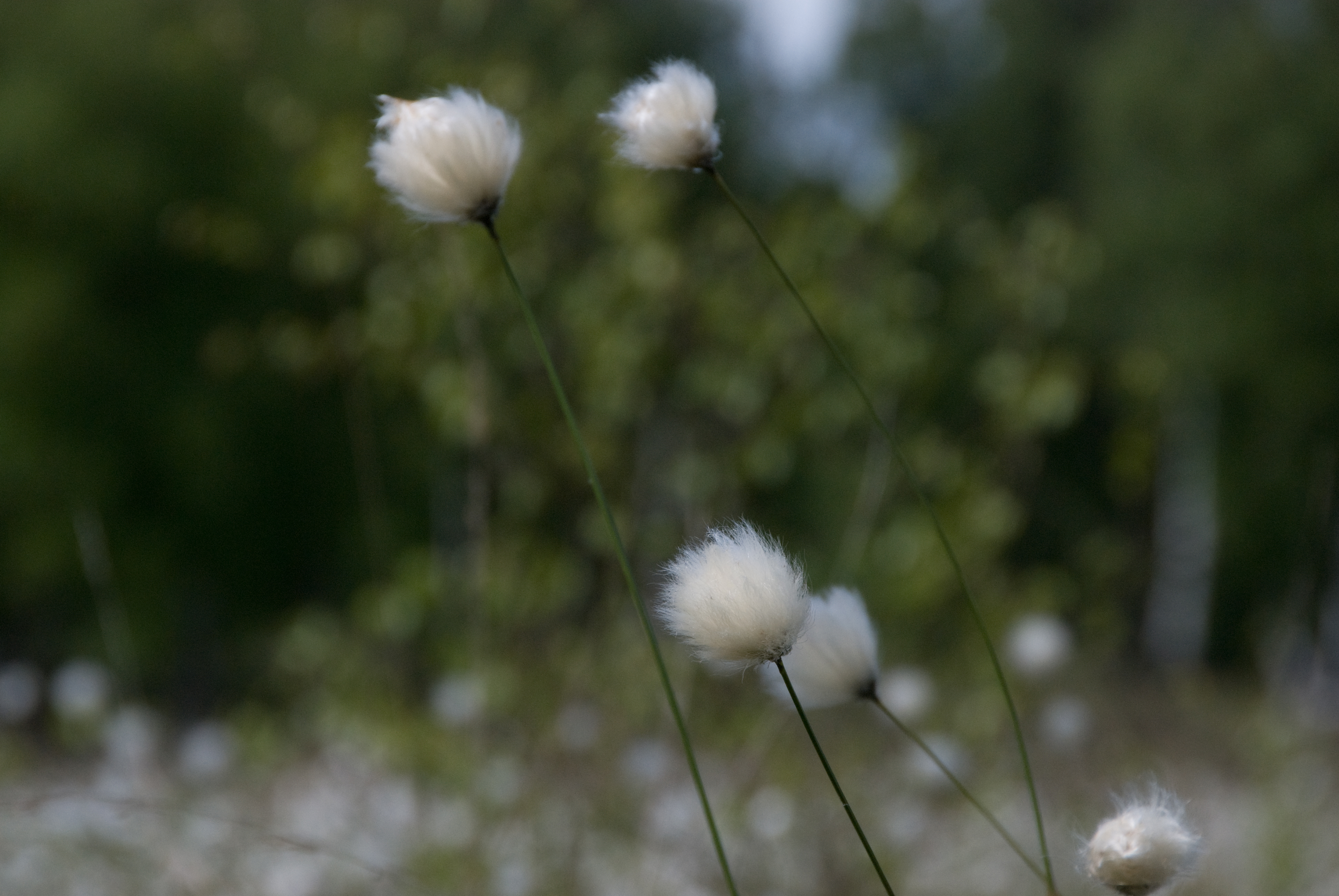
Hare's-tail cottongrass

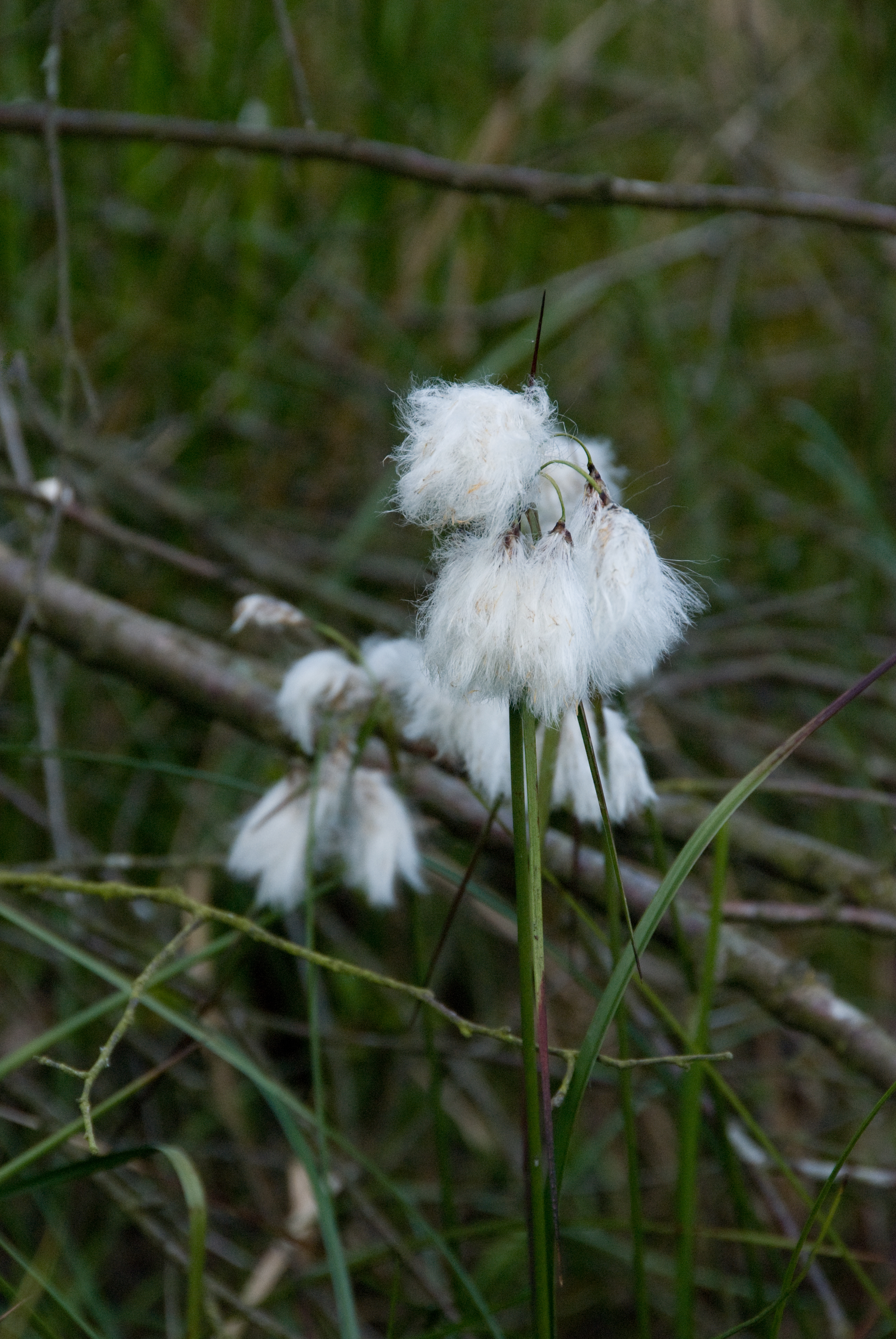
Common cottongrass

== Literature ==
- Landesamt für Natur und Umwelt des Landes Schleswig-Holstein (publ): einzigartig – Naturführer durch Schleswig Holstein, Wachholtz Verlag, Neumunster, 2008, ISBN 978-3-529-05415-0
- Christian Wagner: Zur Ökologie der Moorbirke (Betula pubescens EHRH.) in Hochmooren Schleswig-Holsteins unter besonderer Berücksichtigung von Regenerationsprozessen in Torfstichen. In: Mitteilungen der AG Geobotanik in Schleswig-Holstein und Hamburg. Issue 47, Kiel, 1994
