= August Julius Edmund Pflugk =

German classical philologist and educator

August Julius Edmund Pflugk (21 November 1803, Lychen – 15 December 1839, Danzig) was a German classical philologist and educator.

Beginning in 1821, he studied philology at the University of Berlin, followed by work as an assistant high school teacher in Danzig. In 1825, he became a full-time teacher, and soon afterwards attained the title of professor. At Danzig, he taught classes in the disciplines of history and philology. He died in December 1839 from an abdominal disease (age 36).

He was the author of a series of editions involving the tragedies of Euripides that after his death were continued by philologist Reinhold Klotz (1807-1870). Other significant publications by Pflugk include:

- "De Theopompi Chii vita et scriptis", 1828.
- "Rerum Euboicarum specimen", 1829.
- "Schedae criticae", 1835.

He was also the author of numerous smaller works on Sophocles, Plutarch, Dio Chrysostom, Arrian, Dionysius of Halicarnassus, Dio Cassius and Tacitus.
