= Reinhold Klotz =

German classical scholar (1807–1870)

Reinhold Klotz (13 March 1807 – 10 August 1870) was a German classical scholar.

== Biography ==
Klotz was born in Stollberg near Chemnitz in the Kingdom of Saxony on 13 March 1807. He studied at the University of Leipzig and became assistant professor there in 1832. In 1849 he became a full professor in succession to Gottfried Hermann, and held this post until his death in Kleinschocher (Leipzig) on 10 August 1870. Klotz was a man of unwearied industry, and devoted special attention to Latin literature. During the Revolutions of 1848 and the following years, he showed himself a strong conservative.

== Works ==
He was the author of editions of several classical authors, of which the most important were: the complete works of Cicero (2nd ed. 1869–1874); Clement of Alexandria (1831–1834); Euripides (1841–1867), in continuation of August Julius Edmund Pflugk's edition, but unfinished; Terence (1838–1840), with the commentaries of Aelius Donatus and Eugraphius. Mention should also be made of Handwörterbuch der lateinischen Sprache (5th ed., 1874); Römische Litteraturgeschichte (1847), of which only the introductory volume appeared; an edition of the treatise Liber de Graecae linguae particulis (1835–1842) of Matthaeus Deverius (or Devares), a learned Corfiote (c. 1500–1570), and corrector of the Greek manuscripts in the Vatican; the posthumous Index Ciceronianus (1872) and Handbuch der lateinischen Stilistik (1874). From 1831 to 1855 Klotz was editor of the Neue Jahrbücher für Philologie (Leipzig). With Friedrich Lübker and Ernst Eduard Hudemann, he worked on a Latin dictionary (1847–1857).

A memoir by his son Richard will be found in the Jahrbücher for 1871, pp. 154–163.
