= Rudolf Bülck =

German librarian

Rudolf Bülck (19 August 1880 − 1 May 1954) was a German librarian.

== Life ==
Born in Neumünster, Bülck was the child of Hartwig Friedrich Bülck from Hufner and his wife Elsabe, née Rohwedder. After attending grammar school in Plön he studied German and Romance philology, Danish and history in Freiburg, Kiel and Berlin. In 1926 he passed the state examination and received his doctorate. His dissertation was entitled: "The Schleswig-Holstein Newspaper Industry from its Beginnings to 1789". Bülck first began his career in 1908 in the middle library service at the Göttingen State and University Library, in 1914 he moved to the Kiel University Library. From 1915 to 1918 he took part in the First World War as a soldier. In 1927 Bülck was admitted to the academic service and passed his subject examination in 1928. In 1934 he became a librarian. In 1944 he was seriously injured in a bomb attack on the UB. In 1945 he was the only scientific officer of the UB Kiel who was still in service. He organized the repatriation of the outsourced collections.

Bülck did research on the Low German language, Schleswig-Holstein literature, especially on Klaus Groth and Friedrich Hebbel, Schleswig-Holstein regional studies, the history of the Christian-Albrechts-Universität Kiel and the history of the Kiel UB.

== Publications ==
- Das schleswig-holsteinische Zeitungswesen von den Anfängen bis zum Jahre 1789. Kiel: Ges. für Schleswig-Holsteinische Geschichte, 1928.
- Up ewig ungedeelt: Entstehungsgeschichte eines politischen Schlagworts. Kiel: Mühlau 1928.
- Unbekanntes von Matthias Claudius. In Nordelbingen, Jg. 4, 1925, pp. 112–126.
- Zweiunddreissig plattdeutsche Gelegenheitsdichtungen des 17. und 18. Jahrhunderts aus schleswig-holsteinischen Sammlungen. In Jahrbuch des Vereins für Niederdeutsche Sprachforschung, Jg. 53, 1927/29, pp. 87–153.
- Ein plattdeutsches "Buren-Gesräk" aus dem Jahre 1757. In Jahrbuch des Vereins für Niederdeutsche Sprachforschung, Jg. 54, 1928/29, pp. 60–68.
- Wilhelm von Humboldt in Schleswig-Holstein. In Die Heimat, Jg. 40, 1930, pp. 270–276.
- Die Ortsnamenliteratur in Schleswig-Holstein, Hamburg und Lübeck. In Zeitschrift für Ortsnamenforschung, Jg. 7, 1931, pp. 277–243.
- Die Universitätsbibliothek Kiel und die nordischen Länder. In Deutschland und der Norden: Umrissen, Reden, Vorträge: ein Gedenkbuch, Breslau: Hirt 1931.
- Die politischen Beziehungen Hamburgs zu Schleswig-Holstein. Ein geschichtlicher Abbriß. In Nordelbingen, Jg. 8, 1930/31, pp. 17–47.
- Die Räumlichkeiten der Universitätsbibliothek Kiel bis zum Jahre 1884. In Mitteilungen der Gesellschaft für Kieler Stadtgeschichte, Jg. 39, 1936, issue 2, pp. 112–130.
- Die Universitätsbibliothek Kiel. Ein Abriß ihrer Geschichte. In Kieler Blätter, 1939} pp. 276–289.
- Die Kieler Universitätsbibliothek: ihre Geschichte und Einrichtungen. In Festschrift zum 275 jährigen Bestehen der Christian-Albrechts-Universität Kiel, Kiel 1940, pp. 386–402.
- Schrifttumsnachweis zur Geschichte des vormärzlichen Kieler Studententums. In Ludwig Andresen (ed.): Kieler Studenten im Vormärz: Festgabe der Stadt Kiel zum 275jährigen Bestehen der Christian-Albrechts-Universität in Kiel, Kiel: Jensen 1940, pp. 405–414.
- Das Wartburgliederbuch von 1817 und das Kieler Kommersbuch von 1821. In Ludwig Andresen (ed.): Kieler Studenten im Vormärz: Festgabe der Stadt Kiel zum 275jährigen Bestehen der Christian-Albrechts-Universität in Kiel, Kiel: Jensen 1940, pp. 218–224.
- Dether Mauritii, Propst und Pastor an der Nikolaikirche zu Kiel. In Mitteilungen der Gesellschaft für Kieler Stadtgeschichte, Jg. 44, 1940, pp. 44–52.
- Kieler Studententum im Vormärz. In Ludwig Andresen (ed.): Kieler Studenten im Vormärz: Festgabe der Stadt Kiel zum 275jährigen Bestehen der Christian-Albrechts-Universität in Kiel, Kiel: Jensen 1940, pp. 52–116.
- Aus Kieler Karzerbüchern: ein Beitrag zur Geschichte des Kieler Studentenwesens im Vormärz. In Ludwig Andresen (ed.): Kieler Studenten im Vormärz: Festgabe der Stadt Kiel zum 275jährigen Bestehen der Christian-Albrechts-Universität in Kiel, Kiel: Jensen 1940, pp. 310–341.
- Together with Friedrich Pauly and Alfred Kamphausen: Klaus Groth: Herkunft und Standort. Beiträge zur Groth-Forschung. Hamburg: Wegner 1948 (Jahresgabe 1949 Klaus-Groth-Gesellschaft).
- Die Kieler Universitätsbibliothek unter der Leitung von Berend Kordes (1793–1823). In Zentralblatt für Bibliothekswesen, Jg. 62, 1948, pp. 49–86.
- Karl Müllenhoff und die Anfänge des germanistischen Studiums an der Kieler Universität. In Zeitschrift der Gesellschaft für schleswig-holsteinische Geschichte, Jg. 74/75, 1951, pp. 364–407.
- Geschichte der Kieler Universitätsbibliothek, Eutin: Burkhardt 1960.

== Literature ==
- Alexandra Habermann, Rainer Klemmt, Frauke Siefkes: Lexikon deutscher wissenschaftlicher Bibliothekare 1925–1980. Klostermann, Frankfurt am Main 1985, ISBN 3-465-01664-5, p. 39f.
