= Ernst Eduard Hudemann =

German historian, philologist and educator (1811 - 1889)

Ernst Eduard Hudemann (15 November 1811, Neumünster – 21 December 1889, Plön) was a German educator, philologist and classical historian.

He studied philology at the University of Kiel, afterwards working in Kiel as a Hülfslehrer (teaching assistant) at the Gelehrten-Schule (1837). Beginning in 1840, he worked as an instructor in Schleswig, later serving as a conrector in Oldenburg and Leer (1853). In 1859 he was named Oberlehrer in Landsberg an der Warthe, and in 1864 was appointed subrector in Plön. He died on December 21, 1889.

== Published works ==
Known for his writings on ancient Rome, his best known work being a book involving its postal system, "Geschichte des römischen Postwesens während der Kaiserzeit" (History of the Roman postal system during the imperial period; published in 10 editions between 1875 and 1985). Other significant writings by Hudemann are:

- Hamilcars Kampf auf Hercte und Eryx und der Friede des Catulus, 1842 - Hamilcar's struggle at Hercte and Eryx and the peace of Catulus.
- Zur Gymnasialreform, besonders mit Bezug auf die Vereinfachung des Gymnasialunterrichtes, 1855 - For high school reform, particularly with regard to the simplification of grammar lessons.
- "Quaestiones Ammianeae", 1864.
- Die Bauernaufstände in Gallien während der Römischen Kaiserzeit, 1872 - The peasant uprising in Gaul during the Roman Empire.
- Ueber eine Inschrift aus Ostia, 1876 - About an inscription from Ostia.

Along with educator Friedrich Lübker, he made contributions to Reinhold Klotz' dictionary of the Latin language, "Handwörterbuch der lateinischen Sprache" (1857-1879).
