= Einfeld =

Einfeld is a surname, and may refer to:

- Marcus Einfeld (born 1938), Australian judge and perjurer
- Nikki Einfeld (born 1978), Canadian soprano
- Syd Einfeld (1909–1995), Australian politician
