= Hans Schnoor =

German journalist and musicologist

Hans Schnoor (4 October 1893 – 15 January 1976) was a German musicologist, journalist and music critic. In the late 1950s, he attracted media attention with his denunciation of Arnold Schönberg's A Survivor from Warsaw.

== living and work ==
=== Career ===
Born in Neumünster, Schnoor was the son of a student council. After studying musicology in Leipzig with Hugo Riemann and Karl Straube and completing his doctorate in musicology with Arnold Schering, Schnoor was initially music editor at the Leipzig Freie Presse. Since January 1922 he was director of the feuilleton and music editor of the Dresdner Neueste Nachrichten, before he changed as an editor to the Leipziger Tageblatt. In 1926, Schnoor returned to Dresden and was music editor of the Dresdner Anzeiger until 1945 and also lecturer at the Hochschule für Musik Carl Maria von Weber Dresden. During this time he personally met Richard Strauss and Hans Pfitzner.

In addition to his work as a music editor, Schnoor was also active as an author of musicological books from 1919. In 1926 for example he published Musik der germanischen Völker im XIX. und XX. Jahrhundert.

=== Nazi era ===
Schnoor had been a member of the NSDAP since 1 May 1932 (member number 1.131.053). After the Seizure of control by the Nazis he also belonged to the German Labour Front and the National Socialist People's Welfare Organization and wrote music criticism in the sense of the Nazi ideology. In April 1933, as chairman of the Dresden chapter of the Militant League for German Culture, he invited various music critics to a conference with papers on opera in the Third Reich.

In the new edition of his concert guide Oratorios and secular choral works he wrote in 1939: "The new spiritual Germany with its moving thoughts: people and leader, homeland, blood and soil, race, myth, heroic history, ethos of work, community of all creative folk comrades carries within it the old metaphysical longing for artistic idealization of its highest visual goods".

That Schnoor was not only a staunch Nazi, but also a fervent anti-Semit, is shown exemplarily by a review of the new edition of the Riemann Musiklexikon by Joseph Müller-Blattau, who deemed that Schnoor did not go far enough:

"How strong Riemann's beliefs since 1919, the year of his death, have been bent over with Jewish fixity, of which Alfred Einstein new editions in countless articles displays overwhelming evidence; in many cases the encyclopedia resembled a Jewish temple of fame. Now that the last possible separation between non-Jewish and Jewish in the realm of Adolf Hitler's empire was carried out in the areas of cultural, intellectual and scientific life, one might have expected a correspondingly radical departure from Einstein's editing practice in the new Riemann. But what happened? The whole of Judaism, which had settled into our culture over the past decades, has been given extensive tributes. [...] Thus stands a Herr Adolf Aber as "DJ" lies German Jew (!) in the new Riemann. This "German" Jew, a former Leipzig critic, now a London music wholesale dealer, is listed with all his "merits", even though even the Jewish musicological guild of the System Age had already noticed the lamentability of his publications, for example his Handbuch der Musikliteratur. One would have now, after he is listed in the Reich with all his "merits", even though this evil scientific impostor was morally destroyed by Alfred Heuß long before 1933 and was only held by a stubborn newspaper publisher for reasons of "prestige".

Schnoor wrote for the NS magazine Musik im Kriege.

=== Post-war period ===
After the Second World War, Schnoor remained in the Soviet occupation zone until 1948 and was able to publish a book there to mark the 400th anniversary of the Sächsische Staatskapelle Dresden. In 1949 he moved to Bielefeld, where he became a music critic with the Westfalen-Blatt.

According to Fred K. Prieberg, Schnoor continued to write reviews "with anti-Semitic undertones and the vocabulary of Nazi journalism of yesteryear" The same could be said about several musicological books aimed at a broad audience, most of which Schnoor published at Bertelsmann. In his reference work Oper Operetta Concert, first published in 1955, Schnoor wrote about the Jewish composer Giacomo Meyerbeer that the classical ideals of music and art were foreign to him and that he understood music above all as a business. In doing so, he took up anti-Semitic resentments, which Richard Wagner, Meyerbeer and other Jewish composers had met.

=== 1956 Schönberg scandal ===
As a critic, Schnoor ignited a media scandal in June 1956, after he had torn Arnold Schönberg's Holocaust melodrama A Survivor from Warsaw in the Westfalen-blatt at a program announcement with the following words: "that disgusting play, which must be seem like a mockery to every decent German. To complete the measure of the challenging indecency, the conductor of this program, Hermann Scherchen (who else?) is placed next to the hate song of Schönberg Beethoven's music to Goethe's Egmont. How long is this going to go on?"

A few days later, Schnoor attended a conference of the Evangelische Akademie für Rundfunk und Fernsehen in Arnoldshain in the Taunus region as co-examiner of Winfried Zillig, where the establishment of a cultural programme on radio ("Third Programme") was on the agenda. In his lecture on the "Platz der Neuen Musik" (New Music Square), Zillig presented the work of his teacher Schönberg and at the end quoted the article by his co-examiner. Zillig refused a discussion with Schnoor and left the hall. When confronted, Schnoor made a half-hearted statement. Only two days later, a four-column article by Walter Dirks about the conference appeared in the Frankfurter Allgemeine Zeitung, "Bericht über ein Scherbengericht", which dealt exclusively with the Schnoor case. Dirks brought in the article another quote from Schnoor's column "Wir und der Funk" (We and the radio) of 29 October 1955, where Schnoor had denounced the alleged tyranny of re-emigrants in German radio stations and concluded: "Soon we will be able to talk more openly and precisely about all these things. There will be an uprising - not of the masses, but of the best." In his rejection of New Music, Dirks accused Schnoor of "anti-Semitic nationalism" and National Socialist ideas, coupled with the question of whether this would violate existing laws.

After Theodor W. Adorno had also joined the debate, further details became known. Schnoor, for example, had described Adorno in several critiques as the cause of the "Frankfurt poisoning" of the Westdeutscher Rundfunk and had called him "Wiesengrund" with his discarded name.

After the musicologist Fred K. Prieberg among other things accused him in a polemical broadcast on Südwestfunk Baden-Baden of "National Socialist music criticism", Schnoor, supported by his publisher Hermann Stumpf, filed a private lawsuit. This lawsuit was dismissed in the first instance on the grounds that Schnoor had to put up with "that his crude attacks are answered in the same way". An appeal by Schnoor in the next instance was again rejected. At the court ruling, Prieberg was granted the right to freedom of expression according to § 193 StGB and the assertion in Prieberg's Südwestfunk broadcast that Schnoor's style was reminiscent of the expressions of "Das Schwarze Korps" was confirmed as a statement of fact.

In 1958 Schnoor retired as editor, but continued to write music-historical works. In early 1962 he published the partly autobiographical book Harmony and Chaos. Musik der Gegenwart, in which he made no secret of his aversion to New Music and, among others, tore Stravinsky to pieces, but instead identified Richard Strauss and Hans Pfitzner as the most important composers of the 20th century. He described the Schönberg scandal of 1956 as a "wave of reputation-killing actions" against his person.

Schnoor died in Bielefeld at the age of 82.

== Publications ==
=== Writings ===
- 1919 Das Buxheimer Orgelbuch, ein Beitrag zur deutschen Orgelgeschichte des 15. Jahrhunderts
- 1926 Musik der germanischen Völker im XIX. und XX. Jahrhundert, Verlag Ferdinand Hirt, Breslau
- 1932 Führer durch den Konzertsaal. Vokalmusik. Volume 2, Oratorien und weltliche Chorwerke 5th edition, Breitkopf & Härtel Leipzig
- 1937 Barnabás von Géczy. Aufstieg e. Kunst. Rhapsodie in 10 Sätzen, drawings by Hugo Lange, Güntz-Verlag Dresden
- 1942 Weber auf dem Welttheater. Ein Freischützbuch, Deutscher Literatur-Verlag Dresden
- 1948 Dresden, vierhundert Jahre deutsche Musikkultur. Zum Jubiläum der Staatskapelle und zur Geschichte der Dresdner Oper, Dresdener Verlagsgesellschaft
- 1951 Klänge und Gestalten. Ein Wegweiser zur lebendigen Musik für Konzertfreunde und Funkhörer, Schneekluth Darmstadt
- 1953 Geschichte der Musik, Bertelsmann Gütersloh
- 1953 Weber. Gestalt u. Schöpfung, Verlag der Kunst Dresden
- 1955 Oper, Operette, Konzert. Ein praktisches Nachschlagbuch für Theater- und Konzertbesucher, für Rundfunkhörer und Schallplattenfreunde.
- 1960 Welt der Tonkunst. Eine Einführung in die Musikkunde, Bertelsmann, Gütersloh
- 1962 Harmonie und Chaos. Musik der Gegenwart, Lehmann-Verlag Munich
- 1968 Die Stunde des Rosenkavalier. 300 Jahre Dresdner Oper, Süddeutscher Verlag Munich
- 1969 Kreis Wiedenbrück. Musik und Theater ohne eigenes Dach, Westfälisches Musikarchiv Hagen
- 1975 Geschichte der Musik, 1st newly edited paperback edition, Deutscher Literaturverlag Melchert, Hamburg

=== Arrangements ===
- 1943 Carl Maria von Weber: Peter Schmoll, Singspiel in 2 Aufzügen. New text by Hans Hasse, musical arrangement by Hans Schnoor.

== Literature ==
- Monika Boll: Nachtprogramm. Intellektuelle Gründungsdebatten in der frühen Bundesrepublik. Darin: Der Fall Schnoor. Lit-Verlag, Münster 2004, ISBN 3-8258-7108-8.
- Ernst Klee: Das Kulturlexikon zum Dritten Reich. Wer war was vor und nach 1945, S. Fischer, Frankfurt am Main 2007. ISBN 978-3-10-039326-5.
- Fred K. Prieberg: Musik im NS-Staat. Fischer Taschenbuch-Verlag, Frankfurt am Main 1982 ISBN 3-596-26901-6.
- Fred K. Prieberg: Handbuch Deutsche Musiker 1933–1945. Kiel 2004, CD-ROM-Lexikon.
- Josef Müller-Marein: Musik hat nichts mit Politik zu tun. In Die Zeit, Nr. 4/1962. Kritik zu „Harmonie und Chaos“.
