= Schnorr =

Schnorr is a German surname. Notable people with this surname include the following:

- Claus P. Schnorr (1943–2025), German mathematician and cryptographer
- Donna Schnorr (died 1984), victim of American serial killer Brian Dugan
- Veit Hans Schnorr, later Veit Hans Schnorr von Carolsfeld (1644–1715), German iron and cobalt magnate, ancestor of the Schnorr von Carolsfeld family
- Adolf Schnorr (1883–19??) German businessman. Founder of Adolf Schnorr GmbH, manufacturer of Disc Springs

Schnorr von Carolsfeld

- Julius Schnorr von Carolsfeld (1794–1872), German painter; younger son of Veit Hanns Schnorr von Carolsfeld
- Ludwig Ferdinand Schnorr von Carolsfeld (1788–1853), German artist; elder son of Veit Hanns Schnorr von Carolsfeld
- Ludwig Schnorr von Carolsfeld (1836–1865), German Heldentenor and creator of the role of Tristan; son of Julius Schnorr von Carolsfeld
- Veit Hanns Schnorr von Carolsfeld (1764–1841), German portraitist
- Malvina Garrigues, later Malvina Schnorr von Carolsfeld (1825–1904), Danish-born German operatic soprano; wife of Ludwig Schnorr von Carolsfeld
