= Franziska Greber =

Swiss artist

Franziska Greber

Franziska Greber (* 4. May 1954) is a Swiss artist who grew up in a multicultural family.

== Life and work ==
Franziska Greber links art with society and politics. Her projects address exclusion and participation, marginalization and solidarity, silence and speaking, as well as resignation and resistance. Her multimedia works are developed in relation to place and context; collaboration, transdisciplinarity and participation form the basis. In 2016, she initiated the international art project WOMEN IN THE DARK in Zimbabwe.

Until 2018, she worked as a psychotherapist in private practice, advised organizations in Switzerland and abroad, taught at universities and colleges, and published on various forms of violence, abuse of power and exploitation of dependencies. She was also co-head of the IST Interventionsstelle gegen Häusliche Gewalt (Domestic Violence Intervention Center) of the Directorate of Justice and Home Affairs of the Canton of Zurich.

== Projects ==
=== Women in the Dark ===
WOMEN IN THE DARK is an international, transdisciplinary and participatory art project against discrimination and violence, implemented in eight countries: Zimbabwe, the Seychelles, Mauritius, China, India, Switzerland, Chile and Germany. In collaboration with local women's and human rights organizations, women write their experiences, hopes and demands with red pens on white shirts, in India on dupattas (scarves).

The installations with the garments are complemented by a book with the texts, video and audio works, photographs, further thematic installations and performances. The national implementations are conceived as independent exhibitions and presented each time in new ways. An exception was DISARMING SILENCE at the Palais des Nations in Geneva in 2025, in which the inscribed shirts from all participating project countries were brought together in one installation.

UNTOLD STORIES, Crossroads Centre Galerie, Beijing, 2016

WAVE OF VOICES, Victoria Memorial Hall, Kolkata, 2017

COLUMN OF RESPECT, Cerne Docks, Port Louis, 2019

AUFRUHR DES SCHWEIGENS, Pinakothek der Moderne, Munich, 2021

=== Further Projects ===
Franziska Greber develops and implements further long-term projects, including UPROOTED & APART, which addresses sexual violence in war. UPROOTED was presented in front of the Palais des Nations and APART at the International Red Cross and Red Crescent Museum in Geneva.

UPROOTED, Palais des Nations, Geneva, 2022

UPROOTED, Palais des Nations, Geneva, 2022

APART, International Red Cross and Red Crescent Museum, Geneva, 2022

== Exhibitions ==
=== Solo Exhibition (Selection) ===
- 2026: Kunsthalle Erfurt, WOMEN IN THE DARK – aufruhr des schweigens.
- 2025: Palais des Nations, Geneva, DISARMING SILENCE.
- 2024: Reinbeckhallen, Berlin, WOMEN IN THE DARK – aufruhr des schweigens.
- 2024: Galerie im Burggrafiat, Alzey, WOMEN IN THE DARK – aufruhr des schweigens.
- 2023: Meckelhalle, Freiburg im Breisgau, WOMEN IN THE DARK – aufruhr des schweigens.
- 2022: Palais des Nations, Geneva, UPROOTED.
- 2022: Internationales Rotkreuz- und Rothalbmondmuseum, Geneva, APART.
- 2019: Anna Göldi Museum, Ennenda, SchweigenPunkt.
- 2019: Aapravasi Ghat, Port Louis, WOMEN IN THE DARK.
- 2017: Victoria Memorial Hall, Kolkata, Voices of Courage and Sorrow.

=== Group Exhibition (Selection) ===
- 2025: Palazzo Ducale, Genoa, THE OTHER DIRECTION.
- 2024: Galata Museo del Mare, Genoa, Biennale Le latitudini dell’arte.
- 2021: Pinakothek der Moderne, Munich, feminin – die soziale und politische Kraft des Weiblichen in Kunst und Gesellschaft.
- 2021: Alte Münze, Berlin, Corona Culture.
- 2018: International Cultural and Art Center Meixi Hall, Changsha, Existence.
- 2016: Crossroads Centre, Beijing, UNTOLD STORIES.

== Award ==
- 2023: The Power of the Arts, Germany, für WOMEN IN THE DARK.

== Publications (Selection) ==
- Laura Santini, Franziska Greber: The art of giving voice – a conversation between Laura Santini and Franziska Greber. In: La conoscenza negata. Meltemi Editore, Rom 2025, p. 303–323.
- Franziska Greber, Cornelia Kranich: Häusliche Gewalt – Manual für Fachleute. Interventionsstelle gegen Häusliche Gewalt des Kantons Zürich, 3. Edition, 2013.
- Margit Averdijk, Chantal Billaud, Franziska Greber, Isabel Miko Iso, Cornelia Kranich, Andrea Wechlin, Martha Weingartner: Empfehlungen zur Reduktion von sexueller Gewalt zwischen Teenagern. Ein Beitrag aus fachlicher Sicht. UBS Optimus Foundation, 2013.
- Franziska Greber, Cornelia Kranich Schneiter: Dynamik Häuslicher Gewalt und rechtliche Interventionen. In: Ulrike Borst, Andrea Lanfranchi (Hrsg.): Liebe und Gewalt in nahen Beziehungen. Therapeutischer Umgang mit einem Dilemma. Heidelberg, 2011, p. 219–233.
