= Uma Dasgupta =

Indian actress (1940–2024)

- Born: 12 September 1941; Pabna, Bengal, British India (present-day Pabna, Bangladesh)
- Died: 18 November 2024 (aged 83); Kolkata, West Bengal
- Education: Jogamaya Devi College
- Occupation: Actress
- Known for: Pather Panchali

Uma Sen (née Dasgupta; 12 September 1941 – 18 November 2024) was an Indian Bengali actress who acted the role of 'Durga' in Satyajit Ray's Bengali-language drama film Pather Panchali in 1955.

== Background ==
Uma Dasgupta graduated from Jogamaya Devi College, an affiliate of the University of Calcutta She was a school teacher by profession from 1984 to 2000 in nursery and primary section of Jadavpur Vidyapith, Kolkata.

Sen died on 18 November 2024, at the age of 84 in her house in Kolkata. She was cremated at the Keoratala crematorium, Kolkata on the same day. Her daughter is Srimayee Sen Ram.

== Pather Panchali ==
Pather Panchali, the Bengali drama film was adapted from the novel of the same name by Bibhutibhushan Bandyopadhyay. Satyajit Ray was looking for someone who could play the character of Durga. At the age of 12, while studying in eighth standard in a school, Uma was chosen for the character Durga by Satyajit Ray with the help of Ashish Burman, the Assistant Headmaster of her school It was Uma's first film, as it was also for Subir Banerjee, who portrayed the title character of The Apu Trilogy in this installment of the trilogy.
