= The World of Apu =

1959 film by Satyajit Ray

Apur Sansar (The World of Apu)
- Film poster
- Apur Sansar
- Directed by: Satyajit Ray
- Written by: Satyajit Ray
- Based on: Aparajito by Bibhutibhushan Bandopadhyay
- Produced by: Satyajit Ray
- Starring: Soumitra Chatterjee; Sharmila Tagore; Alok Chakravarty; Swapan Mukherjee
- Cinematography: Subrata Mitra
- Edited by: Dulal Dutta
- Music by: Ravi Shankar
- Production company: Satyajit Ray Productions
- Release date: 1 May 1959
- Running time: 107 minutes
- Country: India
- Language: Bengali
- Box office: ₹75–80 lakh

The World of Apu, initially released as Apur Sansar, is a 1959 Indian Bengali-language drama film written, produced, and directed by Satyajit Ray. It is adapted from the second half of Bibhutibhushan Bandopadhyay’s novel Aparajito. Preceded by Pather Panchali (1955) and Aparajito (1956), it is the concluding instalment of Ray’s acclaimed Apu Trilogy, chronicling the life of Apu, a young Bengali man, through his formative years in early twentieth-century India.

The film stars Soumitra Chatterjee in his debut role as Apu, alongside Sharmila Tagore as Apu’s wife, Aparna—both of whom would become frequent collaborators in Ray’s later works.

Premiering on 1 May 1959, The World of Apu received widespread critical acclaim. It was awarded the Indian National Film Award for Best Feature Film and earned multiple international accolades, including the Sutherland Award for Best Original and Imaginative Film and the National Board of Review Award for Best Foreign Language Film.

== Plot ==
In the early 1930s Apurba "Apu" Kumar Roy is an unemployed graduate living in a rented room in Tala, Calcutta. Despite his teacher's advice to continue his studies past the intermediate level, he is unable to do so because he cannot afford it. He barely manages to get by providing private tutoring while trying to find a job, but his main passion is writing a semi-autobiographical novel that he hopes to get published some day.

Pulu, Apu's friend from school, drops by and coaxes Apu to join him on a trip to his village in Khulna to attend the marriage of his cousin Aparna. On the day of the wedding it is discovered that the bridegroom has a serious mental disorder, and Aparna's mother cancels the marriage, despite her husband's protests. He and the other villagers believe, according to a prevalent Hindu tradition, that the young bride must be wedded off during the appointed auspicious hour, or else she will have to remain unmarried all her life. Apu initially refuses when Pulu and some villagers ask him to come to Aparna's rescue by agreeing to marry her, but he ultimately acquiesces.

After the wedding Apu returns to his apartment in Calcutta with Aparna, and Pulu sets him up in a clerical job. Somewhat to his surprise, a loving relationship begins to bloom between him and Aparna. However, the young couple's blissful days are cut short when Aparna dies while giving birth to their son, Kajal.

Overcome with grief, Apu cannot help holding the child responsible for Aparna's death. He shuns his worldly responsibilities and becomes a vagabond, leaving Kajal to be raised by Aparna's parents while he roams around India alone. On his travels, Apu throws away the manuscript of his novel.

A few years later, Pulu returns after an extended period abroad and finds Kajal growing wild and uncared for. He seeks out Apu, finding him working at a coal mine, and advises his old friend to take up his fatherly responsibility. At last, Apu decides to come back to reality and reunite with his son. When he reaches Aparna's family home, Kajal, having seen him for the first time in his life, at first does not accept him as a father. Eventually, he accepts Apu as a friend, and they return to Calcutta together to start life afresh.

== Cast ==
- Soumitra Chatterjee as Apurba "Apu" Kumar Roy
- Sharmila Tagore as Aparna Roy, Apu's wife
- Alok Chakravarty as Kajal Roy, Apu and Aparna's son
- Swapan Mukherjee as Pulu, Apu's friend
- Sefalika Devi as Aparna's mother
- Dhiresh Majumdar as Sasinarayan, Aparna's father
- Dhiren Ghosh as Apu's landlord

== Production ==
Soumitra Chatterjee, a radio announcer and stage actor, had auditioned, along with doyen of Bengali theatre Sisir Bhaduri, for the role of the adolescent Apu in Aparajito (1956). Though Ray thought Chatterjee had the right look, he found the actor too old for the part in that film, but he remembered Chatterjee when casting the role of adult Apu in The World of Apu two years later. Chatterjee, unaware that he had been selected for the role, was invited to visit the set of Ray's fourth film, Jalsaghar, to watch the shoot, and, as he was leaving, Ray revealed the casting choice by calling Chatterjee over and introducing him to actor Chhabi Biswas with the words: "This is Soumitra Chattopadhyay; he's playing Apu in my next film Apur Sansar". Despite being selected to play the lead role in his first film, Chatterjee was unsure of his career choice, and especially his looks, as he did not consider himself photogenic. However, on 9 August 1958, when the first shot of the film was given an okay in one take, he realized he had found his vocation.

Ray had a tough time finding the right actress to play Aparna. He even placed an ad in a local daily asking for photographs from girls between the ages of 15 and 17, and, although there were over a thousand responses, he did not find any of the girls worth auditioning. Then, Ray became aware of a girl, Sharmila Tagore, who had recently performed at a dance recital at Children's Little Theatre (CLT) in Kolkata. A relative of Rabindranath Tagore, she subsequently auditioned and was selected for the role.

== Awards ==
National Film Awards (India)

- 1959: Winner – President's Gold Medal for the All India Best Feature Film

British Film Institute Awards (London Film Festival)

- 1960: Winner – Sutherland Award for Best Original And Imaginative Film

14th Edinburgh International Film Festival

- 1960: Winner – Diploma of Merit

National Board of Review Awards (United States)

- 1960: Winner – Best Foreign Film

British Academy Film Awards (United Kingdom)

- 1962: Nominated – BAFTA Award for Best Film

== Reception and legacy ==
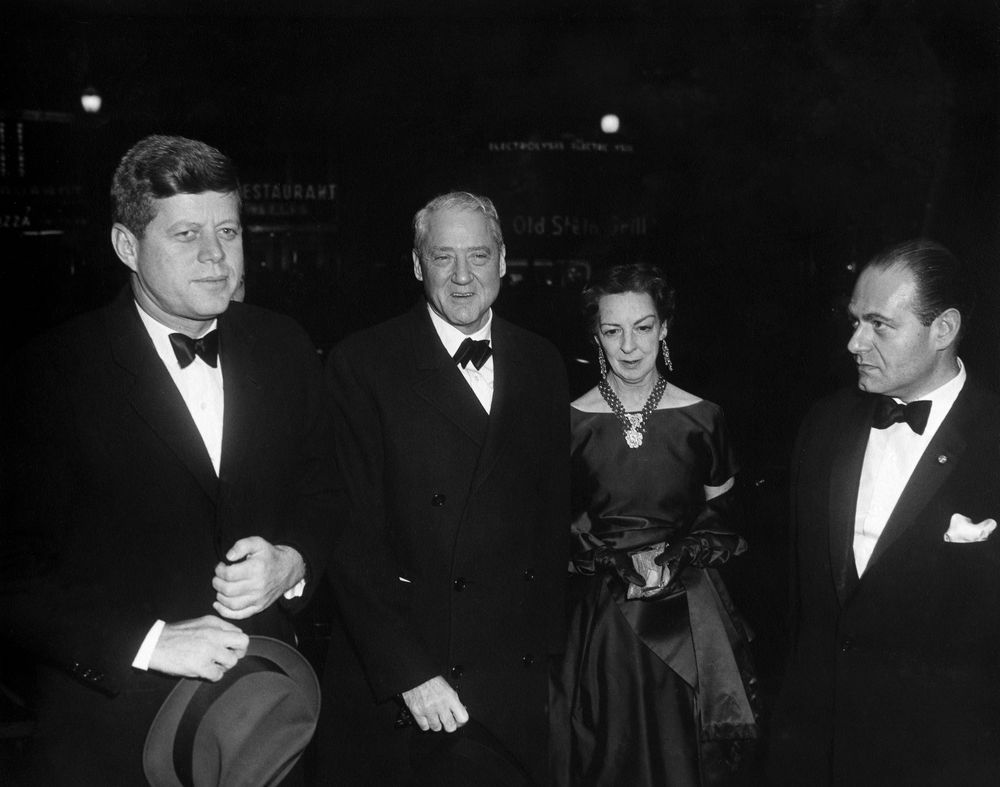
U.S. President John F. Kennedy arrives at the Dupont Theater in Washington, D.C. for a screening of the film on 16 February 1961.

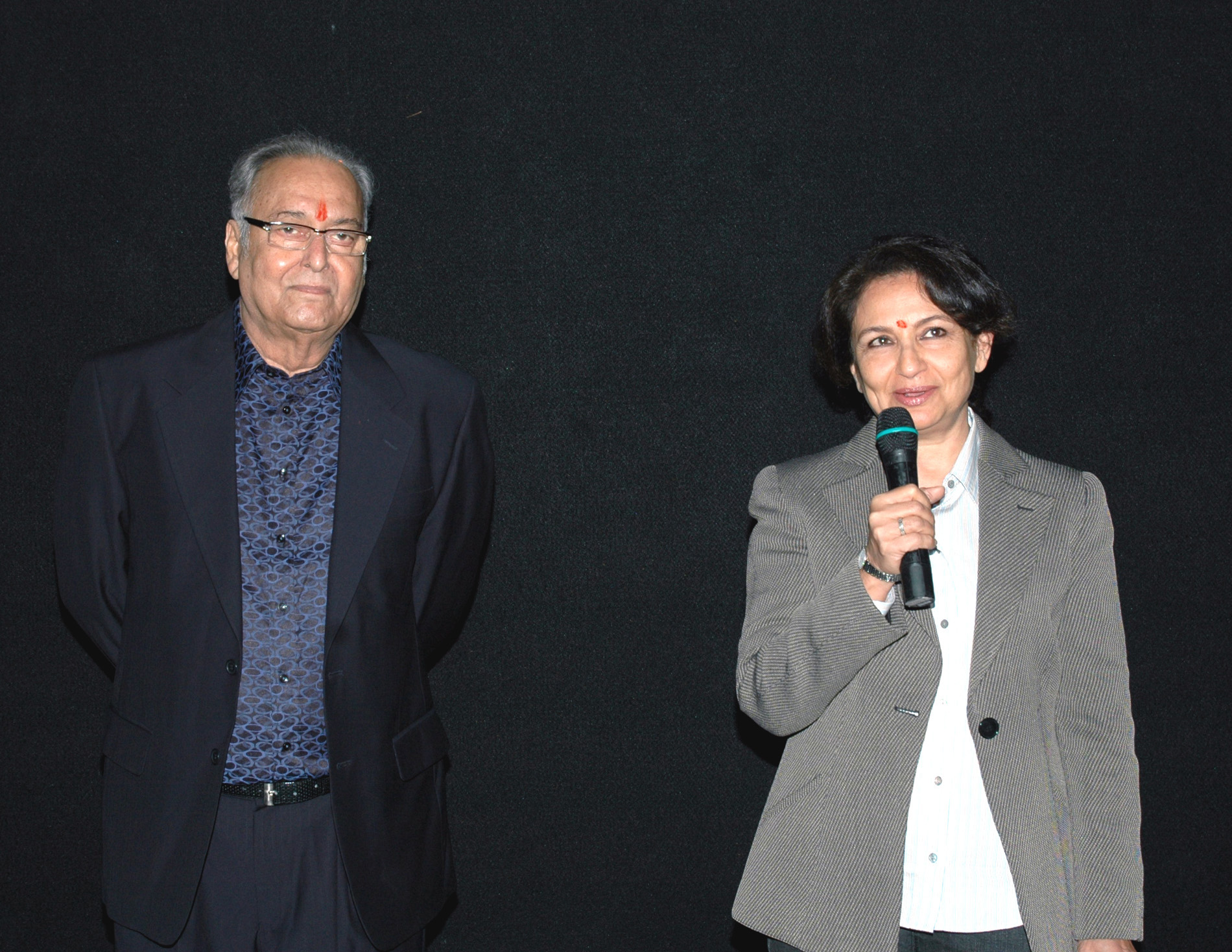
Soumitra Chatterjee and Sharmila Tagore presenting the film at the 40th International Film Festival of India in 2009.

At the Indian box office, the film earned a profit of ₹75–80 lakh for the distributors. It was chosen as the Indian entry for the Best Foreign Language Film category at the 32nd Academy Awards, but was not selected as one of the final nominees.

On Rotten Tomatoes, The World of Apu has a 96% fresh rating based on a 27 reviews, with an average score of 9.04/10. Its critics' consensus reads: "Achingly poignant, beautifully shot, and evocatively atmospheric, The World of Apu closes out Satyajit Ray's classic trilogy on a high note." In 1992, Sight & Sound (the British Film Institute's film magazine) ranked The Apu Trilogy at #88 in its Critics' Poll list of all-time greatest films. The World of Apu appeared in the 1982 Sight & Sound poll of the Greatest Films of All Time, ranked at #42. In 2002, a combined list of Sight & Sound critics' and directors' poll results ranked The World of Apu at #93. In 1998, the Asian film magazine Cinemaya's critics' poll of all-time greatest films ranked The Apu Trilogy at #7. In 1999, The Village Voice ranked The Apu Trilogy at #54 in its Top 250 "Best Films of the Century" list, based on a poll of critics.

In 1996, The World of Apu was included in Movieline magazine's "100 Greatest Foreign Films". In 2001, film critic Roger Ebert included The Apu Trilogy in his list of "Great Movies". In 2002, The World of Apu featured in "The New York Times Guide to the Best 1,000 Movies Ever Made". In 2005, The Apu Trilogy was included in Time magazine's All-Time 100 best movies list. In 2012, the film was ranked #235 in the "Sight & Sound Top 250 Films" list.

The World of Apu has been influential across the world. In Gregory Nava's 1995 film My Family, the final scene is duplicated from the final scene of Apur Sansar. The film's influence can also be seen in several films by Philip Kaufman and Jean-Luc Godard, and, in Paul Auster's 2008 novel Man in the Dark, two characters have a discussion about the film.

== Preservation ==
The Academy Film Archive preserved the entire Apu Trilogy in 1996, including Apur Sansar. In 2013, the video distribution company The Criterion Collection, in collaboration with the Academy of Motion Picture Arts and Sciences' Film Archive, began the restoration of the original negatives of the Apu trilogy, including Apur Sansar. These negatives had been severely damaged by a fire in London in 1993, and all film cans and fragments belonging to the Ray films were sent to the Motion Picture Academy for storage, where they lay unseen for two decades. It was discovered upon reexamination that, although many parts of the films were indeed destroyed by fire or the effects of age, other parts were salvageable. The materials were shipped to a restoration laboratory in Bologna, Italy: L'Immagine Ritrovata. For those parts of the negative that were missing or unusable, duplicate negatives and fine-grain masters from various commercial or archival sources were used. The Criterion Collection's own lab then spent six months creating the digital version of all three films, at times choosing to preserve the distinctive look of the films even at the cost of retaining some imperfections.

== See also ==
- Cinema of West Bengal
- Parallel Cinema
- List of submissions to the 32nd Academy Awards for Best Foreign Language Film
- List of Indian submissions for the Academy Award for Best Foreign Language Film
