= Pather Panchali =

1955 film by Satyajit Ray

- Theatrical release poster
- Directed by: Satyajit Ray
- Screenplay by: Satyajit Ray
- Based on: Pather Panchali by Bibhutibhushan Bandyopadhyay
- Starring: Subir Banerjee; Kanu Banerjee; Karuna Banerjee; Uma Dasgupta; Chunibala Devi; Tulsi Chakraborty
- Cinematography: Subrata Mitra
- Edited by: Dulal Dutta
- Music by: Ravi Shankar
- Production company: Government of West Bengal
- Distributed by: Aurora Film Corporation (1955); Merchant Ivory Productions; Sony Pictures Classics (1995) (Note: Aurora Film Corporation was the distributor, according to credits shown in the film. MoMA and the distributor Edward Harrison were instrumental in the film's MoMA screening and later US release.(Bee, Hellczer & McFadden 2013, p. 204) A DVD review in dvdbeaver.com listed Artificial Eye Entertainment as the distributor of Region 2 and Columbia Tri-Star as the distributor of Region 1 format DVDs.)
- Release date: 26 August 1955 (India)
- Running time: 112–126 minutes (Note: Different sources identify different running times for the film. A Museum of Modern Art anthology states 112 minutes.(Bee, Hellczer & McFadden 2013, p. 204) An LA Weekly notice states 115 minutes. Stuart Jeffries of The Guardian states 125 minutes in a 2010 report. Rovi Hal Erickson of The New York Times states 126 minutes in a review summary in NYT Critics' Pick. In 2005 Doug Pratt states 125 minutes but mentions that most references list the running time at about 10 minutes less than that. (Pratt 2005, p. 908) The British Board of Film Classification lists separate running times for film (110 minutes 55 seconds) and video (119 minutes 31 seconds) versions.)
- Country: India
- Language: Bengali
- Budget: ₹70,000–150,000 (Note: Satyajit Ray wrote in My Years with Apu: A Memoir (1994) that the budget was ₹70,000, (Ray 1996, p. 36) and the loan from the government of West Bengal was ₹ 70,000. (Ray 1996, p. 60) During an interview in 1970, in reply to the question "How much did the production of Pather Panchali cost in all, if you count in the value of the rupee today?", Ray said, "In those days it cost a little over ₹150,000, whereas an average film now costs twice that much".(Isaksson 2007, p. 40)) ($14,700–31,500) (Note: The exchange rate in 1955 was ₹4.76 per 1 US dollar (US$).)
- Box office: est. ₹10 crore ($21 million)

Pather Panchali (Bengali pronunciation: [pɔtʰer pãtʃali], transl. Song Of The Little Road) is a 1955 Indian drama film written and directed by Satyajit Ray in his directorial debut. It is an adaptation of Bibhutibhushan Bandyopadhyay's 1929 Bengali novel of the same name. The film stars Subir Banerjee, Kanu Banerjee, Karuna Banerjee, Uma Dasgupta, and Chunibala Devi in leading roles. As the first instalment of The Apu Trilogy, the film depicts the childhood hardships of the protagonist Apu and his elder sister Durga amid the harsh realities of rural poverty. The film is widely acclaimed as a classic of Indian cinema and is regarded as one of the greatest and most influential films in the history of cinema.

The film was shot mainly on location, had a limited budget, featured mostly amateur actors, and was made by an inexperienced crew. Lack of funds led to frequent interruptions in production, which took nearly three years, but the West Bengal government pulled Ray out of debt by buying the film for the equivalent of $60,000, which it turned into a profit of $700,000 by 1980. The sitar player Ravi Shankar composed the film's soundtrack and score using classical Indian ragas. Subrata Mitra was in charge of the cinematography while editing was handled by Dulal Dutta. Following its premiere on 3 May 1955 during an exhibition at New York's Museum of Modern Art, Pather Panchali was released in Calcutta the same year to an enthusiastic reception. A special screening was attended by the Chief Minister of West Bengal and the Prime Minister of India.

Critics have praised its realism, humanity, and soul-stirring qualities and Subir Banerjee's performance as Apu (which is widely regarded as one of the best child performances in cinema), while detractors called the film's slow pace a drawback. Scholars have commented on the film's lyrical quality and realism (influenced by Italian neorealism), its portrayal of the poverty and small delights of daily life, and the use of what the author Darius Cooper has termed the "epiphany of wonder", among other themes.

The tale of Apu's life is continued in the two subsequent installments of Ray's trilogy: Aparajito (The Unvanquished, 1956) and Apur Sansar (The World of Apu, 1959). Pather Panchali is described as a turning point in Indian cinema, as it was among the films that helped pioneer the parallel cinema movement, which espoused authenticity and social realism. The first film from independent India to attract major international critical attention, it won India's National Film Award for Best Feature Film in 1955, the Best Human Document award at the 1956 Cannes Film Festival, and several other awards, establishing Ray as one of the country's most distinguished filmmakers. It is often featured in lists of the greatest films ever made. It is also one of the most profitable Indian films of all time, having been made on a reported budget of ₹70,000–150,000 ($14,700–31,500) and grossing est. ₹10 crore ($21 million). The film was the highest grossing Indian film for the year 1955, the 9th highest grossing Indian Bengali film of all time as well as the 29th highest grossing Bengali film overall.

== Plot ==
In late-1910s Nischindipur, rural Bengal, Harihar Roy earns a meagre living as a pujari (priest) but dreams of a better career as a poet and playwright. His wife Sarbajaya cares for their children, Durga and Apu, and Harihar's elderly cousin, Indir Thakrun. Because of their limited resources, Sarbajaya resents having to share her home with the old Indir, who often steals food from their already bare kitchen. Durga is fond of Indir and often gives her fruit stolen from a wealthy neighbour's orchard. One day, the neighbour's wife accuses Durga of stealing a bead necklace—which Durga denies—and blames Sarbajaya for encouraging her tendency to steal.

In her role as the older sister, Durga looks after Apu with a protective care balanced with playful teasing. The siblings spend much of their time engaging in various local activities, such as resting together beneath trees, looking at images inside a traveling vendor's bioscope, pursuing the neighborhood confection seller, and observing a jatra folk theatre performance staged by a traveling theatrical group. During the evening hours, they regularly pause to listen to the acoustic sound of a train whistle echoing from a distant railway track.

Sarbajaya becomes more openly hostile towards Indir, causing Indir to take temporary refuge in the home of another relative. Increasingly unwell, she eventually goes back home while Durga and Apu are out catching a glimpse of the train. Upon their return, the children find that she has died.

With prospects drying up in the village, Harihar travels to the city to seek a better job. He promises that he will return with money to repair their dilapidated house, but is gone longer than expected. During his absence, the family sinks deeper into poverty, and Sarbajaya grows increasingly desperate and anxious. One day during the monsoon season, Durga catches a cold and develops a high fever after playing in the downpour. Her condition worsens as a thunderstorm batters the crumbling house, and she dies the next morning.

Harihar returns home and shows Sarbajaya the merchandise he has brought from the city. A silent Sarbajaya breaks down at her husband's feet, and Harihar cries out in grief as he discovers that Durga has died. The family decide to leave their ancestral home for Benaras. As they pack, Apu finds the necklace Durga had earlier denied stealing; he throws it into a pond. Apu and his parents leave the village on an ox-cart, while a snake is seen slithering into their now barren house.

== Cast ==
- Kanu Banerjee as Harihar Roy
- Karuna Banerjee as Sarbajaya Roy
- Subir Banerjee as Apurba "Apu" Roy
- Runki Banerjee as Durga Roy (child)
- Uma Dasgupta as Durga Roy (teenager)
- Chunibala Devi as Indir Thakrun, the old aunt
- Tulsi Chakraborty as Prasanna, the schoolteacher
- Haren Banerjee as Chinibas, the sweets seller
- Binoy Mukherjee as Baidyanath Majumdar, the village head .

== Production ==
=== Novel and Title ===
Bibhutibhushan Bandopadhyay's novel Pather Panchali is a classic bildungsroman (a type of coming-of-age story) in the canon of Bengali literature. It first appeared as a serial in a Calcutta periodical in 1928, and was published as a book the following year. The novel depicts a poor family's struggle to survive in their rural ancestral home and the upbringing of Apu, the son of the family. The later part of the novel, where Apu and his parents leave their village and settle in Benaras, formed the basis of Aparajito (The Unvanquished, 1956), the second film of the Apu trilogy.

Satyajit Ray (2 May 1921 – 23 April 1992), working as a graphic designer for Signet Press, created the illustrations for an abridged edition of the book in 1944. At that time, Ray read the unabridged novel; Signet's owner D. K. Gupta told Ray that the abridged version would make a great film. The idea appealed to Ray, and around 1946–47, when he considered making a film, he turned to Pather Panchali because of qualities that "made it a great book: its humanism, its lyricism, and its ring of truth". The author's widow permitted Ray to make a film based on the novel; the agreement was in principle only, and no financial arrangement was made.

The Bengali word path literally means path, and pather means "of the path". Panchali is a type of narrative folk song that used to be performed in Bengal and was the forerunner of another type of folk performance, the jatra. English translations of the Bengali title include Song of the Little Road, The Lament of the Path, Song of the Road, and Song of the Open Road.

=== Script ===
A page from the film's storyboard, created by Ray

Pather Panchali did not have a script; it was made from Ray's drawings and notes. Ray completed the first draft of the notes during his sea voyage to and from London in 1950. Before principal photography began, he created a storyboard dealing with details and continuity. Years later, he donated those drawings and notes to Cinémathèque Française.

In Apur Panchali (the Bengali translation of My Years with Apu: A Memoir, 1994), Ray wrote that he had omitted many of the novel's characters and that he had rearranged some of its sequences to make the narrative better as cinema. Changes include Indir's death, which occurs early in the novel at a village shrine in the presence of adults, while in the film Apu and Durga find her corpse in the open. The scene of Apu and Durga running to catch a glimpse of the train is not in the novel, in which neither child sees the train, although they try. Durga's fatal fever is attributed to a monsoon downpour in the film, but is unexplained in the novel. The ending of the film—the family's departure from the village—is not the end of the novel.

Ray tried to extract a simple theme from the random sequences of significant and trivial episodes of the Pather Panchali novel, while preserving what W. Andrew Robinson describes as the "loitering impression" it creates. According to Ray, "the script had to retain some of the rambling quality of the novel because that in itself contained a clue to the feel of authenticity: life in a poor Bengali village does ramble". For Robinson, Ray's adaptation focuses mainly on Apu and his family, while Bandopadhyay's original featured greater detail about village life in general.

=== Casting ===
Kanu Banerjee (who plays Harihar) was an established Bengali film actor. Karuna Banerjee (Sarbajaya) was an amateur actress from the Indian People's Theatre Association, and the wife of Ray's friend. Uma Dasgupta, who successfully auditioned for the part of Durga, also had prior theatre experience.

For the role of Apu, Ray advertised in newspapers for boys of ages five to seven. None of the candidates who auditioned fulfilled Ray's expectations, but his wife spotted a boy in their neighbourhood, and this boy, Subir Banerjee, was cast as Apu. The surname of three of the main actors and two supporting actors happened to be Banerjee, but they were not related to each other. The hardest role to fill was the wizened old Indir. Ray eventually found Chunibala Devi, a retired stage actress living in Calcutta's Pike-Para Lane, as the ideal candidate. Several minor roles were played by the villagers of Boral, where Pather Panchali was filmed.

=== Filming ===
Apu and Durga running to catch a glimpse of a train, a famous scene of the film

Shooting started on 27 October 1952. Boral, a village near Calcutta, was selected in early 1953 as the main location for principal photography, and night scenes were shot in-studio. The technical team included several first-timers, including Ray himself and cinematographer Subrata Mitra, who had never operated a film camera. Art director Bansi Chandragupta had professional experience, having worked with Jean Renoir on The River (1951). Both Mitra and Chandragupta went on to establish themselves as respected professionals.

Mitra had met Ray on the set of The River, where Mitra was allowed to observe the production, take photographs and make notes about lighting for personal reference. Having become friends, Mitra kept Ray informed about the production and showed his photographs. Ray was impressed enough by them to promise him an assistant's position on Pather Panchali, and when production neared, invited him to shoot the film. As the 21-year-old Mitra had no prior filmmaking experience, the choice was met with scepticism by those who knew of the production. Mitra himself later speculated that Ray was nervous about working with an established crew.

Funding was a problem from the outset. No producer was willing to finance the film, as it lacked stars, songs and action scenes. On learning of Ray's plan, one producer, Mr Bhattacharya of Kalpana Movies, contacted author Bibhutibhushan Bandyopadhyay's widow to request the filming rights and get the film made by Debaki Bose, a well-established director. The widow declined as she had already permitted Ray to make the film. The estimated budget for the production was ₹70,000 (about US$14,613 in 1955). One producer, Rana Dutta, gave money to continue shooting, but had to stop after some of his films flopped.

Ray thus had to borrow money to shoot enough footage to persuade prospective producers to finance the whole film. To raise funds, he continued to work as a graphic designer, pawned his life insurance policy and sold his collection of gramophone records. Production manager Anil Chowdhury convinced Ray's wife, Bijoya, to pawn her jewels. Ray still ran out of money partway through filming, which had to be suspended for nearly a year. Thereafter shooting was done only in intermittent bursts. Ray later admitted that the delays had made him tense and that three miracles saved the film: "One, Apu's voice did not break. Two, Durga did not grow up. Three, Indir Thakrun did not die".

Bidhan Chandra Roy, the Chief Minister of West Bengal, was requested by an influential friend of Ray's mother to help the production. The Chief Minister obliged, and government officials saw the footage. The Home Publicity Department of the West Bengal government assessed the cost of backing the film and sanctioned a loan, given in instalments, allowing Ray to finish production. (Note: Ray writes that the amount of loan was Rs 70,000. (Ray 2005, p. 77)) The government misunderstood the nature of the film, believing it to be a documentary for rural uplift, and recorded the loan as being for "roads improvement", a reference to the film's title.

Monroe Wheeler, head of the department of exhibitions and publications at New York's Museum of Modern Art (MoMA), who was in Calcutta in 1954, heard about the project and met Ray. He considered the incomplete footage to be of very high quality and encouraged Ray to finish the film so that it could be shown at a MoMA exhibition the following year. Six months later, American director John Huston visited India for some early location scouting for The Man Who Would Be King (eventually made in 1975). Wheeler had asked Huston to check the progress of Ray's project. Huston saw excerpts of the unfinished film and recognised "the work of a great film-maker". Because of Huston's positive feedback, MoMA helped Ray with additional money.

Kishore Kumar, a close friend and relative of Ray who he had immense respect for him gave 5000 rupees to save the film from being shut down.

Including the delays and hiatuses in production, it took three years to complete the shooting of Pather Panchali.

== Influences ==
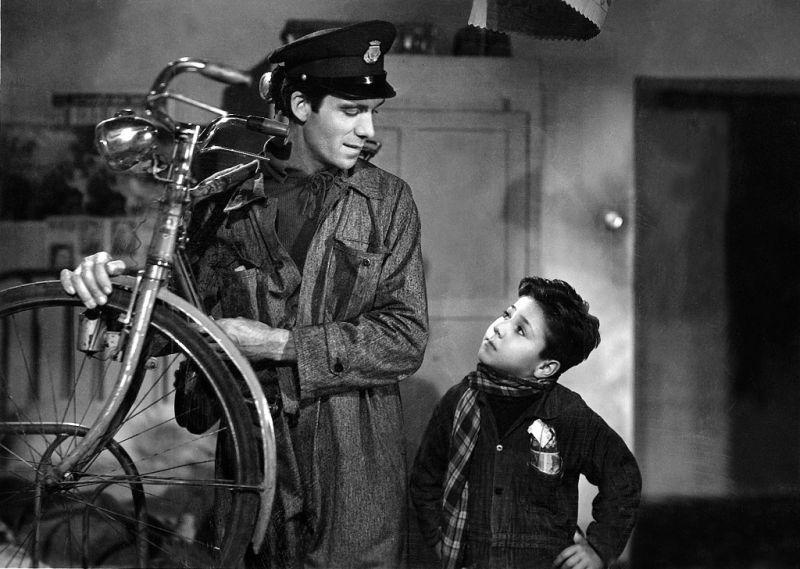
A still from Bicycle Thieves, the film which inspired Ray to become a filmmaker

The realist narrative style of Pather Panchali was influenced by Italian neorealism and the works of French director Jean Renoir. In 1949 Renoir came to Calcutta to shoot his film The River (1951). Ray, a founding member of the Calcutta Film Society (established in 1947), helped him scout for locations in the countryside. When Ray told him about his longstanding wish to film Pather Panchali, Renoir encouraged him to proceed. In 1950 Ray was sent to London by his employer, the advertising agency D.J. Keymer, to work at their headquarters. During his six months in London, he watched about 100 films. Among these, Vittorio De Sica's neorealist film Bicycle Thieves (1948) had a profound impact on him. In a 1982 lecture, Ray said that he had come out of the theatre determined to become a filmmaker. The film made him believe that it was possible to make realistic cinema that was shot on location with an amateur cast.

The international success of Akira Kurosawa's Japanese film Rashomon (1950) and Bimal Roy's 1953 Hindi film Do Bigha Zamin (which was shot partly on location and was about a peasant family) led Ray to believe that Pather Panchali would find an international audience. Ray also had more indigenous influences, such as Bengali literature and the native Indian theatrical tradition, particularly the rasa theory of classical Sanskrit drama. Darius Cooper describes the complicated doctrine of rasa as "center[ed] predominantly on feelings experienced not only by the characters but also conveyed in a certain artistic way to the spectator".

9 years later, Kishore Kumar made the movie Door Gagan Ki Chhaon Mein. He was heavily influenced by Pather Panchali and watched it thirteen times before making his own film.

== Soundtrack ==
The soundtrack of the film was composed by the sitar player Ravi Shankar, who was at an early stage of his career, having debuted in 1939. The background scores feature pieces based on several ragas of Indian classical music, played mostly on the sitar. The soundtrack, described in a 1995 issue of The Village Voice as "at once plaintive and exhilarating", is featured in The Guardian's 2007 list of 50 greatest film soundtracks. It has also been cited as an influence on The Beatles, specifically George Harrison.

Shankar saw about half the film in a roughly edited version before composing the background score, but he was already familiar with the story. According to Robinson, when Ray met Shankar the latter hummed a tune that was folk-based but had "a certain sophistication". This tune, usually played on a bamboo flute, became the main theme for the film. The majority of the score was composed within the duration of a single night, in a session that lasted for about eleven hours. Shankar also composed two solo sitar pieces—one based on the raga Desh (traditionally associated with rain), and one sombre piece based on the raga Todi. He created a piece based on the raga Patdeep, played on the tar shehnai, by Dakshina Mohan Tagore to accompany the scene in which Harihar learns of Durga's death. The film's cinematographer, Subrata Mitra, performed on the sitar for parts of the soundtrack.

== Release and reception ==
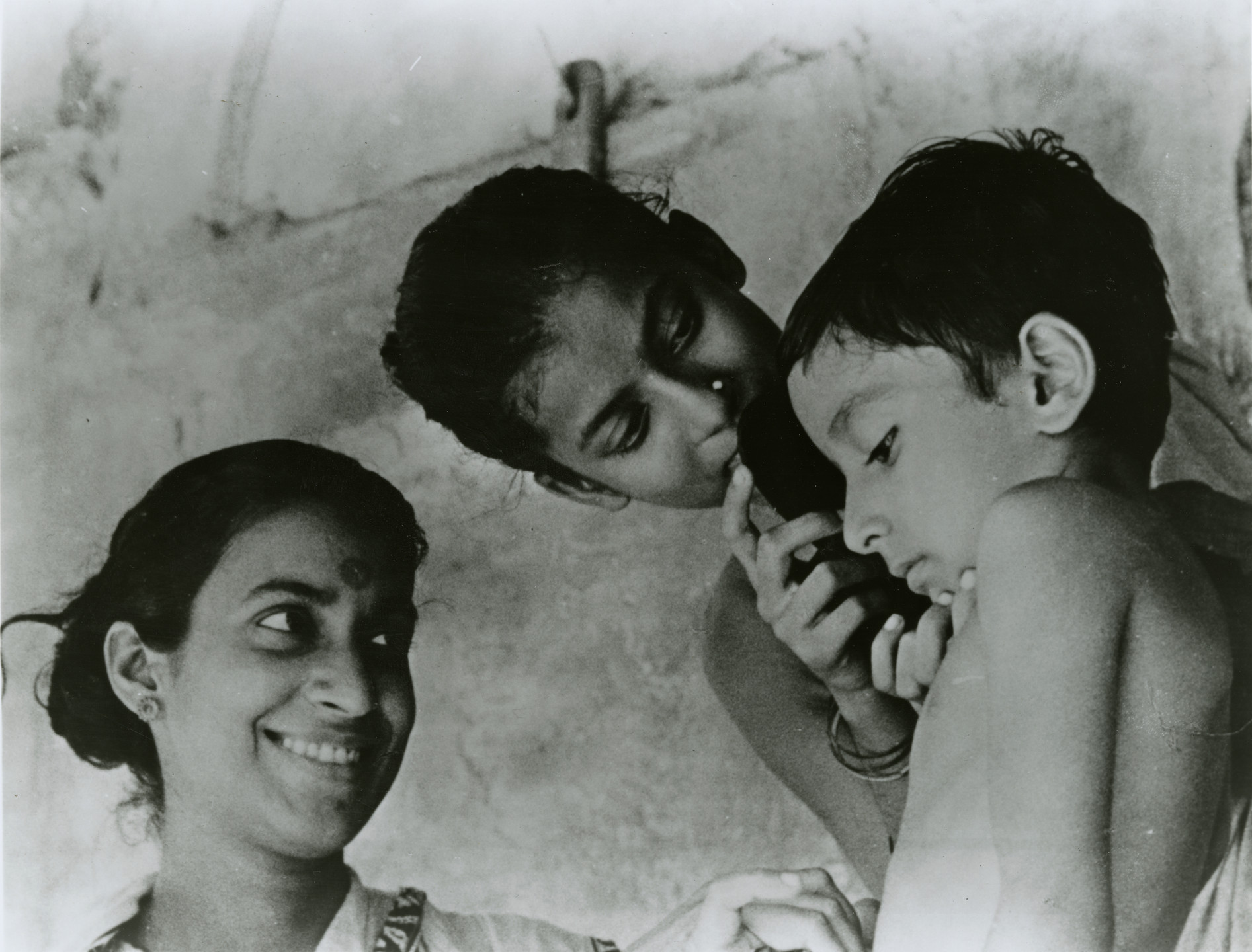
A film still featured in the 1955 MoMA exhibition "The Family of Man"

Ray and his crew worked long hours on post-production, managing to submit it just in time for Museum of Modern Art's Textiles and Ornamental Arts of India exhibition of May 1955. The film, billed as The Story of Apu and Durga, lacked subtitles. It was one of a series of six evening performances at MoMA, including the US debut of sarod player Ali Akbar Khan and the classical dancer Shanta Rao. Pather Panchali's MoMA opening on 3 May was well received. A film still of Apu having his hair brushed by his sister Durga and mother Sarbojaya was featured in The Family of Man, a 1955 MoMA exhibition.

Pather Panchali had its domestic premiere at the annual meeting of the Advertising Club of Calcutta; the response there was not positive, and Ray felt "extremely discouraged". Before its theatrical release in Calcutta, Ray designed large posters, including a neon sign showing Apu and Durga running, which was strategically placed in a busy location in the city. Pather Panchali was released in Basusree, a Calcutta cinema on 26 August 1955 and received a poor initial response. The screenings started filling up within a week or two, buoyed by word of mouth. It opened again at another cinema, where it ran for seven weeks. A delay in subtitling led to the postponement of the UK release until December 1957. It went on to achieve great success in the US in 1958, running for eight months at the Fifth Avenue Playhouse in New York. It was a record run for the Fifth Avenue cinema. The Bengali government earned a profit of $50,000 from its initial US release, and decades later the film grossed $402,723 from its 2015 limited release. The film reportedly grossed an estimated total of ₹100 million ($21 million) at the worldwide box office, as of 2017.

In India the film's reception was enthusiastic. The Times of India wrote: "It is absurd to compare it with any other Indian cinema... Pather Panchali is pure cinema". Chief Minister Roy arranged a special screening in Calcutta for Prime Minister Jawaharlal Nehru, who came out of the theatre impressed. Despite opposition from some within the governments of West Bengal and India because of its depiction of poverty, Pather Panchali was sent to the 1956 Cannes Film Festival with Nehru's personal approval. It was screened towards the end of the festival, coinciding with a party given by the Japanese delegation, and only a small number of critics attended. Although some were initially unenthusiastic at the prospect of yet another Indian melodrama, the film critic Arturo Lanocita found "the magic horse of poetry... invading the screen". Pather Panchali was subsequently named Best Human Document at the festival.

Lindsay Anderson commented after the Cannes screening that Pather Panchali had "the quality of ultimate unforgettable experience". In subsequent years, critics have given positive reviews. A 1958 review in Time described Pather Panchali as "perhaps the finest piece of filmed folklore since Robert Flaherty's Nanook of the North". In her 1982 book 5001 Nights at the Movies, Pauline Kael wrote: "Beautiful, sometimes funny, and full of love, it brought a new vision of India to the screen". Basil Wright considered it "a new and incontrovertible work of art". (Note: The comment by Basil Wright appears in James Chapman's 2003 book Cinemas of the World: Film and Society from 1895 to the Present. The year of the comment is not mentioned. (Chapman 2003, p. 323)) James Berardinelli wrote in 1996 that the film "touches the souls and minds of viewers, transcending cultural and linguistic barriers". In 2006 Philip French of The Observer called it "one of the greatest pictures ever made". Twenty years after the release of Pather Panchali, Akira Kurosawa summarised the effect of the film as overwhelming and lauded its ability "to stir up deep passions".

The reaction was not uniformly positive. On seeing the film, François Truffaut is reported to have said: "I don't want to see a movie of peasants eating with their hands". Bosley Crowther, the most influential critic of The New York Times, wrote in 1958, "any picture as loose in structure or as listless in tempo as this one is would barely pass as a 'rough cut' with the editors in Hollywood", even though he praised its gradually emerging poignancy and poetic quality. The Harvard Crimson argued in 1959 that its fragmentary nature "contributes to the film's great weakness: its general diffuseness, its inability to command sustained attention. For Pather Panchali, remarkable as it may be, is something of a chore to sit through". Early in the 1980s, Ray was criticised by Nargis Dutt, an Indian parliamentarian and former actress, for "exporting poverty". Darius Cooper writes that while many critics celebrated the Apu trilogy "as a eulogy of third-world culture, others criticized it for what they took to be its romanticization of such a culture". Stanley Kauffmann of The New Republic wrote that "its story is simple almost to the point of banality, it is rewarding if taken as a dramatized documentary".

As of May 2021, the film has a 97% fresh rating on Rotten Tomatoes based on an aggregate of 69 reviews with an average score of 9.3/10. The website's critical consensus reads: "A film that requires and rewards patience in equal measure, Pather Panchali finds director Satyajit Ray delivering a classic with his debut". In 2018 the film earned the 15th spot when BBC released the top 100 foreign language films ever, and filmmaker Christopher Nolan called it "one of the best films ever made".

=== 1990s restoration ===
In the 1990s, Merchant Ivory Productions, with assistance from the Academy Film Archive and Sony Pictures Classics, undertook a project to restore the prints. The restored prints, along with several other Ray films, were released in select US theatres. Pather Panchali is available in DVD in Region 2 (DVD region code) PAL and Region 1 NTSC formats. Artificial Eye Entertainment is the distributor of Region 2 while Columbia Tri-Star is the distributor of Region 1 format.

=== 2015 restoration ===
In 2013, the video distribution company The Criterion Collection, in collaboration with the Academy of Motion Picture Arts and Sciences' Film Archive, began the restoration of the original negatives of the Apu trilogy, including Pather Panchali. These negatives had been severely damaged by a fire in London in 1993, and all film cans and fragments belonging to the Ray films were sent to the Motion Picture Academy for storage, where they lay unseen for two decades. It was discovered upon re-examination that, although many parts of the films were indeed destroyed by fire or the effects of age, other parts were salvageable. The materials were shipped to a restoration laboratory in Bologna, Italy: L'Immagine Ritrovata. Over a thousand hours of labor by hand were expended in restoring and scanning the negatives and, in the end, about 40 percent of the Pather Panchali negative was restored. For those parts of the negative that were missing or unusable, duplicate negatives and fine-grain masters from various commercial or archival sources were used. The Criterion Collection's own lab then spent six months creating the digital version of all three films, at times choosing to preserve the distinctive look of the films even at the cost of retaining some imperfections.

On 4 May 2015, the restored Pather Panchali premiered at the Museum of Modern Art, a little more than 60 years to the day after the film's world premiere at the same venue. Several days later, all three films opened at New York's Film Forum, where they were originally scheduled to run for three weeks. Because of overwhelming public demand—with one writer commenting that "audiences can't seem to get enough"—the films were held over at that theater until 30 June. The trilogy was then sent to be exhibited in many other cities throughout the U.S. and Canada. The restoration work was widely acclaimed, with commentators calling the look of the restored films "gorgeous", "pristine" and "incredible".

== Themes ==
Author Andrew Robinson, in the book The Apu Trilogy: Satyajit Ray and the Making of an Epic (2010), notes that it is challenging to narrate the plot of Pather Panchali and the "essence of the film lies in the ebb and flow of its human relationships and in its everyday details and cannot be reduced to a tale of events". In his 1958 New York Times review, Crowther writes that Pather Panchali delicately illustrates how "poverty does not always nullify love" and how even very poor people can enjoy the little pleasures of their world. Marie Seton describes how the film intersperses the depiction of poverty and the delights and pleasures of youth. She represents the bond between Durga and Indir, and their fate, as signifying a philosophical core: that both the young and the old die. Seton writes of the film's "lyrical" qualities, noting especially the imagery immediately before the onset of monsoon. Robinson writes about a peculiar quality of "lyrical happiness" in the film, and states that Pather Panchali is "about unsophisticated people shot through with great sophistication, and without a trace of condescension or inflated sentiment".

Darius Cooper discusses the use of different rasa in the film, observing Apu's repeated "epiphany of wonder", (Note: Darius Cooper uses the term "epiphany of wonder" to denote the rasa of camatkara. He quotes Abhinavabharati by Abhinavagupta to explain the camatkara rasa: "... camatkara is an uninterrupted (acchina) state of immersion (avesha) in an enjoyment characterized by the presence of a sensation of inner fullness (trpti). It might be said indeed that camatkara is the action proper to a tasting (cam) or enjoying subject, i.e., to a person immersed in the inner movement (trpti) of a magical (adbhuta) enjoyment". (Cooper 2000, pp. 24–25) Cooper says that through Apu the "universe is revealed. To Apu is given the dominant quality of camatkara, and it is through this sense of wonder that Apu is made to discover and enjoy not only the world that constantly surrounds him but also that other world created by his pratibha or imagination".(Cooper 2000, p. 25)) brought about not only by what the boy sees around him, but also when he uses his imagination to create another world. For Cooper, the immersive experience of the film corresponds to this epiphany of wonder. Stephen Teo uses the scene in which Apu and Durga discover railway tracks as an example of the gradual build-up of epiphany and the resulting immersive experience.

Sharmishtha Gooptu discusses the idea that the idyllic village life portrayed in Pather Panchali represents authentic Bengali village life, which disappeared during the upheavals of Partition in 1947. She suggests that the film seeks to connect an idealised, pre-partition past with the actual present of partitioned Bengal, and that it uses prototypes of rural Bengal to construct an image of the ideal village. In contrast to this idealism, Mitali Pati and Suranjan Ganguly point out how Ray used eye-level shots, natural lighting, long takes and other techniques to achieve realism. Mainak Biswas has written that Pather Panchali comes very close to the concept of Italian neorealism, as it has several passages with no dramatic development, even though the usual realities of life, such as the changing of seasons or the passing of a day, are concretely filmed.

== Accolades ==
Pather Panchali has won many national and international awards. At India's 3rd National Film Awards in 1955, it was named Best Feature Film and Best Bengali Feature Film. The next year, it competed for the Palme d'Or at Cannes, where it won Best Human Document and an OCIC Award – Special Mention. More awards from film festivals across the world followed: the Vatican Award (Rome), the Golden Carabao (Manila), and the Diploma of Merit (Edinburgh) in 1956; the Selznick Golden Laurel for Best Film (Berlin), the Golden Gate for Best Director and Best Picture (San Francisco) in 1957; Best Film (Vancouver), and the Critics' Award for Best Film (Stratford) in 1958. It also won several awards for best foreign-language film: at the National Board of Review Awards 1958; at the Afro Arts Theater, New York, 1959; the Kinema Jumpo Award in Japan, 1966; and the Bodil Award in Denmark, 1969. In 1958 it had been nominated for Best Film at the 11th British Academy Film Awards. Chunibala Devi was awarded best actress for her role of Indir Thakrun posthumously at 1st Manila Film Festival in 1966, after 11 years of the film's release.

Sight & Sound, the British Film Institute's (BFI) magazine, has included Pather Panchali several times in its Critics' Polls of the greatest-ever films. In 1962, it ranked 11th; in 1992, 6th; and in 2002, 22nd. It also topped the British Film Institute's user poll of "Top 10 Indian Films" of all time in 2002. The magazine ranked the film 42nd in its 2012 critics' poll of "Top 50 Greatest Films of All Time" and 48th in its 2012 directors' poll. In the most recent 2022 edition of BFI's Greatest films of all time list the film ranked 35th in the critics poll and 22nd in the director's poll. In 1998, in a similar critics' poll from Asian film magazine Cinemaya, Pather Panchali was ranked the second-greatest film of all time. The Village Voice ranked the film at number 12 (tied with The Godfather) in its Top 250 "Best Films of the Century" list in 1999, based on a poll of critics. In 2010, The Guardian ranked the film 12th in its list of 25 greatest arthouse films.

Pather Panchali was included in various other all-time lists, including Time Out's "Centenary Top One Hundred Films" in 1995, the San Francisco Chronicle "Hot 100 Films From the Past" in 1997, the Rolling Stone "100 Maverick Movies of the Last 100 Years" in 1999, "The New York Times Guide to the Best 1,000 Movies Ever Made" in 2002, the BFI Top Fifty "Must See" Children's Films in 2005, and BFI's "Top 10 Indian Films" of all time. It was included in NDTV's list of "India's 20 greatest films", and in 2013 in CNN-IBN's list of "100 greatest Indian films of all time". Akira Kurosawa ranked Pather Panchali at No. 37 on his Top 100 favourite films of all time list. The Apu trilogy as a whole was included in film critic Roger Ebert's list of "100 Great Movies" in 2001 and in Time's All-Time 100 best movies list in 2005.

== Legacy ==
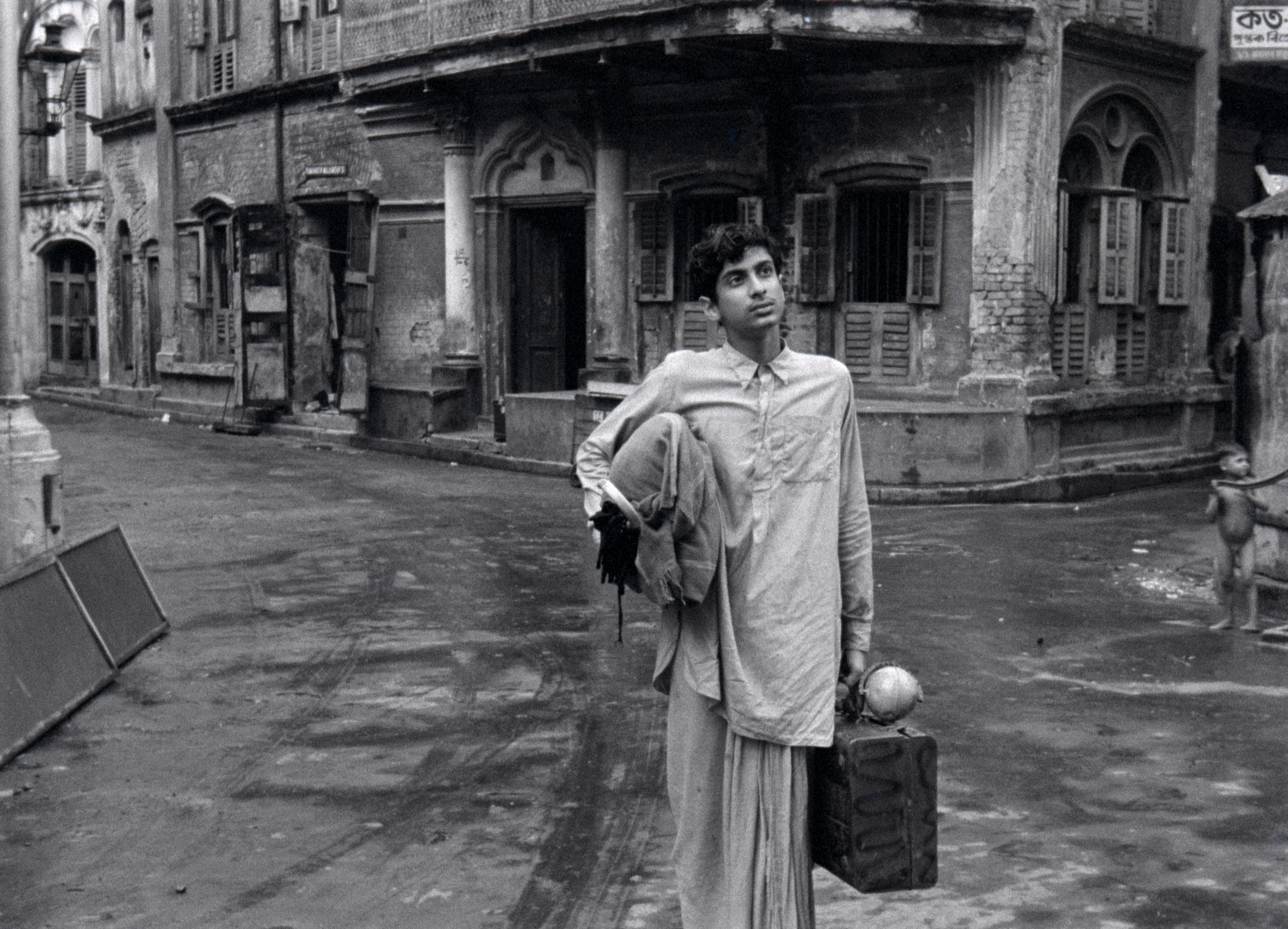
Adolescent Apu, as portrayed in the sequel Aparajito

Pather Panchali was followed by two films that continued the tale of Apu's life—Aparajito (The Unvanquished) in 1956 and Apur Sansar (The World of Apu) in 1959. Together, the three films constitute the Apu trilogy. Aparajito portrays the adolescent Apu, his education in a rural school and a Calcutta college. Its central theme is the poignant relationship between a doting mother and her ambitious young son. Apur Sansar depicts Apu's adult life, his reaction to his wife's premature death, and his final bonding with his son whom he abandoned as an infant. The sequels also won many national and international awards. Ray did not initially plan to make a trilogy: he decided to make the third film only after being asked about the possibility of a trilogy at the 1957 Venice Film Festival, where Aparajito won the Golden Lion. Apur Panchali (2014) is a Bengali film directed by Kaushik Ganguly, which depicts the real-life story of Subir Bannerjee, the actor who portrayed Apu in Pather Panchali. Aparajito, a 2022 Bengali film directed by Anik Dutta, tells the story of the making of Pather Panchali.

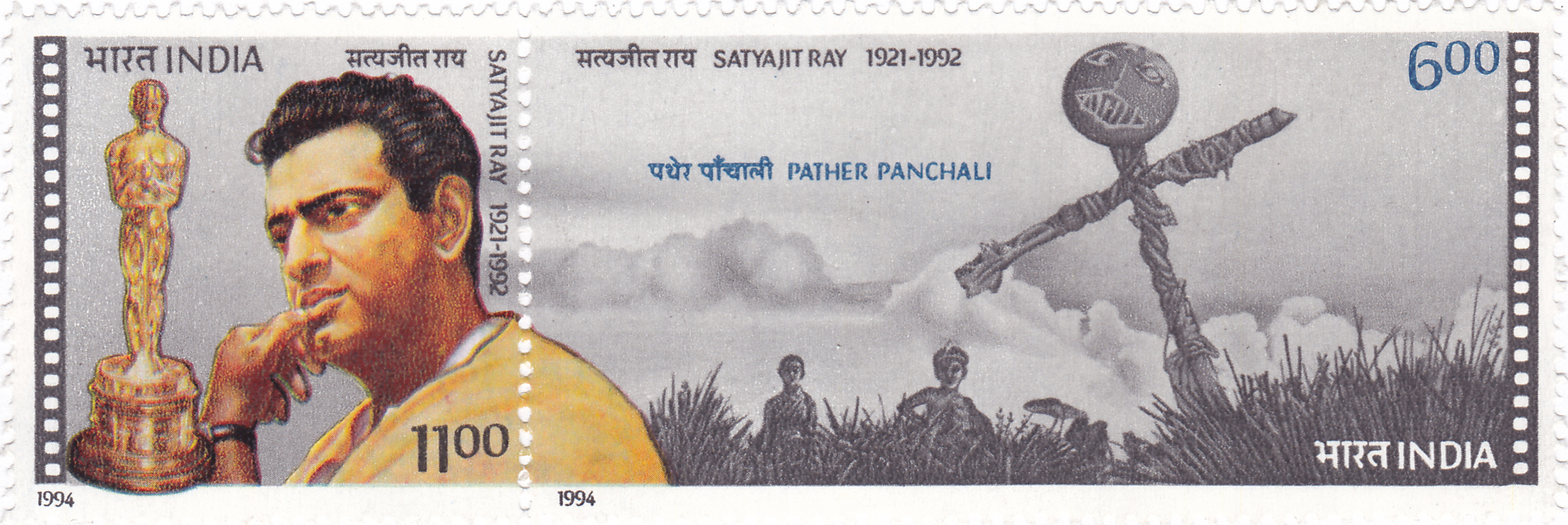
Commemorative stamp published by India in 1994

Pather Panchali was the first film made in independent India to receive major critical attention internationally, placing India on the world cinema map. It was one of the first examples of Parallel Cinema, a new tradition of Indian film-making in which authenticity and social realism were key themes, breaking the rule of the Indian film establishment. Although Pather Panchali was described as a turning point in Indian cinema, some commentators preferred the view that it refined a "realist textual principle" that was already there. In 1963 Time noted that thanks to Pather Panchali, Satyajit Ray was one of the "hardy little band of inspired pioneers" of a new cinematic movement that was enjoying a good number of imitators worldwide. The film has since been considered as a "global landmark" and "among the essential moviegoing experiences". On 2 May 2013, commemorating Ray's birthday, the Indian version of the search engine Google displayed a doodle featuring the train sequence.

After Pather Panchali, Ray went on to make 36 more films, including feature films, documentaries and shorts. He worked on scripting, casting, scoring, cinematography, art direction and editing, as well as designing his own credit titles and publicity material. He developed a distinctive style of film-making based, as was the case with Pather Panchali, on visual lyricism and strongly humanistic themes. Thus, Ray established himself as an internationally recognized auteur of cinema.

== Bibliography ==
- Bee, Harriet Schoenhotz; Hellczer, Cassandra; McFadden, Sarah, eds. (2013). MoMA Highlights: 350 Works from The Museum of Modern Art, New York. The Museum of Modern Art. ISBN 978-0-87070-846-6. Archived from the original on 3 January 2014.
- Bergan, Ronald (2006). Film. Dorking Kindersley. ISBN 978-1-4053-1280-6.
- Biswas, Moinak (2007). "In the mirror of an alternative globalism: the neorealist encounter in India". In Ruberto, Laura E.; Wilson, Kristi M. (eds.). Italian Neorealism and Global Cinema. Wayne State University Press. ISBN 978-0-8143-3324-2.
- Chapman, James (2003). Cinemas of the World: Film and Society from 1895 to the Present. Reaktion Books. ISBN 1-86189-162-8.
- Cooper, Darius (2000). The Cinema of Satyajit Ray: Between Tradition and Modernity. Cambridge University Press. ISBN 0-521-62980-2.
- Corrigan, Timothy; White, Patricia (2012). The Film Experience: An Introduction. Bedford/St. Martin's. ISBN 978-0-312-68170-8. Archived from the original on 27 June 2014.
- Cousins, Mark (2004). The Story of Film: A Worldwide History of Film from the Host of the BBC's Scene by Scene. Thunder's Mouth Press. ISBN 1-56025-612-5.
- Das Gupta, Chidananda (Autumn 1980). "New Directions in Indian Cinema". Film Quarterly. 34 (1). University of California Press: 32. doi:10.1525/fq.1980.34.1.04a00070. ISSN 0015-1386. OCLC 1569205.
- Ettedgui, Peter (1999). Cinematography: Screencraft. Focal Press. ISBN 0-240-80382-5.
- Gokulsing, K. Moti; Dissanayake, Wimal (2004). Indian Popular Cinema: A Narrative of Cultural Change. Trentham Books. ISBN 1-85856-329-1.
- Gokulsing, K. Moti; Dissanayake, Wimal (2013). Routledge Handbook of Indian Cinemas. Routledge. ISBN 978-1-136-77284-9.
- Gooptu, Sharmistha (2010). Bengali Cinema: 'An Other Nation'. Routledge. ISBN 978-0-203-84334-5. Archived from the original on 7 July 2021.
- Gugelberger, Georg M. (1996). The Real Thing: Testimonial Discourse and Latin America. Duke University Press. ISBN 978-0-8223-1844-6.
- Gulzar; Nihalni, Govind; Chatterjee, Saibal (2003). "Biographies". Encyclopaedia of Hindi Cinema. Popular Prakashan. ISBN 81-7991-066-0.
- Isaksson, Folke (2007). "Conversation with Satyajit Ray". In Cardullo, Bert (ed.). Satyajit Ray: Interviews. University Press of Mississippi. ISBN 978-1-57806-937-8. Archived from the original on 3 January 2014.
- Kael, Pauline (2011). 5001 Nights at the Movies. Henry Holt and Company. ISBN 978-1-250-03357-4. Archived from the original on 4 January 2014.
- Khair, Tabish (2005). Amitav Ghosh: A Critical Companion. Orient Longman. ISBN 81-7824-113-7.
- Lavezzoli, Peter (2006). The Dawn of Indian Music in the West. Continuum International Publishing Group. ISBN 0-8264-1815-5.
- Leng, Simon (2006). While My Guitar Gently Weeps: The Music of George Harrison. Hal Leonard Corporation. ISBN 1-4234-0609-5. Archived from the original on 19 August 2020.
- Lyden, John (2009). The Routledge Companion to Religion and Film. Taylor & Francis. ISBN 978-0-415-44853-6. Archived from the original on 27 July 2014.
- Mehta, Ved (1998). "City of Dreadful Night". A Ved Mehta Reader: The Craft of the Essay. Yale University Press. ISBN 0-300-07561-8.
- Pati, Mitali; Ganguly, Suranjan (1996). "Perspectives on Bengali film and literature". In Natarajan, Nalini; Nelson, Emmanuel Sampath (eds.). Handbook of Twentieth-century Literatures of India. Greenwood Publishing Group. ISBN 978-0-313-28778-7.
- Pratt, Douglas (2005). Doug Pratt's DVD: Movies, Television, Music, Art, Adult, and More!. UNET 2 Corporation. ISBN 978-1-932916-01-0. Archived from the original on 3 January 2014.
- Ray, Satyajit (2010). Apur Panchali (in Bengali). Ananda Publishers. ISBN 978-81-7215-367-0.
- Ray, Satyajit (1996). My Years with Apu. Penguin Books India. ISBN 978-0-14-024780-0. Archived from the original on 3 January 2014.
- Ray, Satyajit (2005). Our Films, Their Films. Orient Longman. ISBN 81-250-1565-5.
- Robinson, Andrew (1989). Satyajit Ray: The Inner Eye. University of California Press. ISBN 978-0-520-06946-6.
- Robinson, Andrew (2010). The Apu Trilogy: Satyajit Ray and the Making of an Epic. Bloomsbury Publishing. ISBN 978-1-78672-962-0. Archived from the original on 12 September 2022.
- Ruberto, Laura E.; Wilson, Kristi M. (2007). Italian Neorealism and Global Cinema. Wayne State University Press. ISBN 978-0-8143-3324-2.
- Santas, Constantine (2002). Responding to film: A Text Guide for Students of Cinema Art. Rowman & Littlefield. ISBN 0-8304-1580-7.
- Seton, Marie (2003). Portrait of a Director: Satyajit Ray. Penguin Books India. ISBN 978-0-14-302972-4.
- Teo, Stephen (2013). The Asian Cinema Experience: Styles, Spaces, Theory. Routledge. ISBN 978-0-415-57146-3. Archived from the original on 7 July 2021.
- Wood, R (1972). The Apu trilogy. November Books Ltd. ISBN 0-85631-003-4.
