= Basusree Cinema, Kolkata =

Basusree Cinema
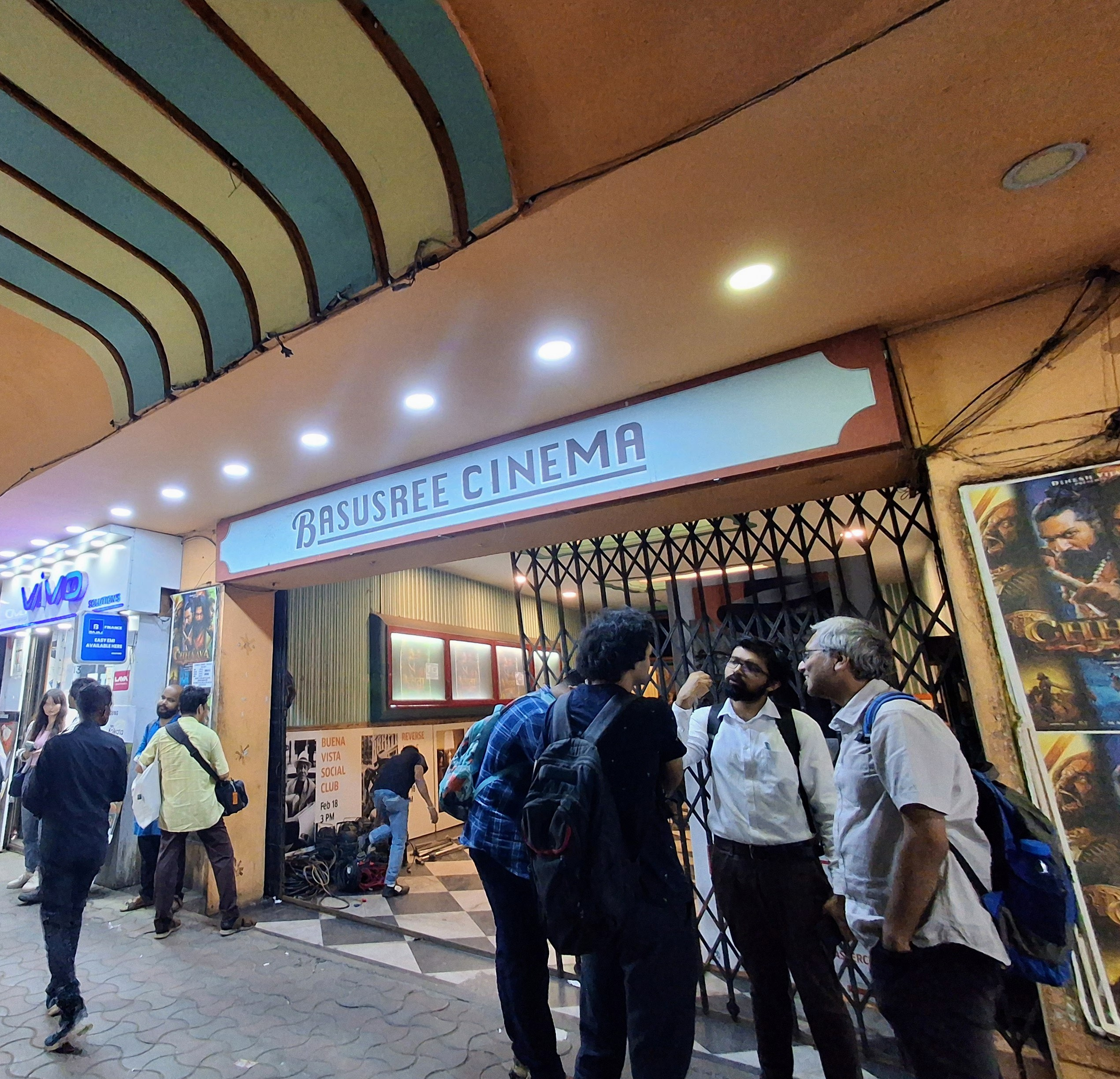
- Facade of Basusree Cinema in 2025

- Location in Kolkata

General information
- Status: Active
- Type: Cinema hall
- Location: 102, Shyamaprasad Mukherjee Road, Kalighat, Kolkata, India
- Coordinates: 22°31′22″N 88°20′47″E
- Opened: 19 December 1947
- Inaugurated: 19 December 1947

Website
- basusreecinema.com/Default.html

Basusree Cinema is a single screen cinema hall located on Shyama Prasad Mukherjee Road, near Jatin Das Park metro station in Kolkata, West Bengal, India. The cinema hall was inaugurated on 19 December 1947 by Satyabhushan Basu and is regarded as one of the city’s heritage theatres. The hall hosted the premiere of Satyajit Ray’s debut film Pather Panchali on 26 August 1955, which was attended by several prominent personalities, including the then Chief Minister, Bidhan Chandra Roy.

== History and legacy ==
Since its inauguration on 19 December 1947 by Satyabhushan Basu, Basusree Cinema has been one of Kolkata’s notable single-screen theatres. It opened with M. S. Subbulakshmi’s Meera. It later hosted the premiere of Satyajit Ray’s debut film, Pather Panchali in 1955, along with other Bengali films such as Aparajito, Sonar Kella, and Ritwik Ghatak’s Ajantrik. The theatre also screened notable Hindi films such as Mughal-e-Azam, Johny Mera Naam, Deewar etc.

Over the years, It also hosted cultural and musical programmes featuring artists like Pandit Ravi Shankar, Ali Akbar Khan, Alla Rakha, Vilayat Khan, Bade Ghulam Ali Khan, Lata Mangeshkar, Manna Dey and Hemanta Mukherjee.

In February 2025, Wim Wenders visited Basusree Cinema to attend a retrospective of his films, which was part of the King of the Road: India Tour organised by the Film Heritage Foundation.

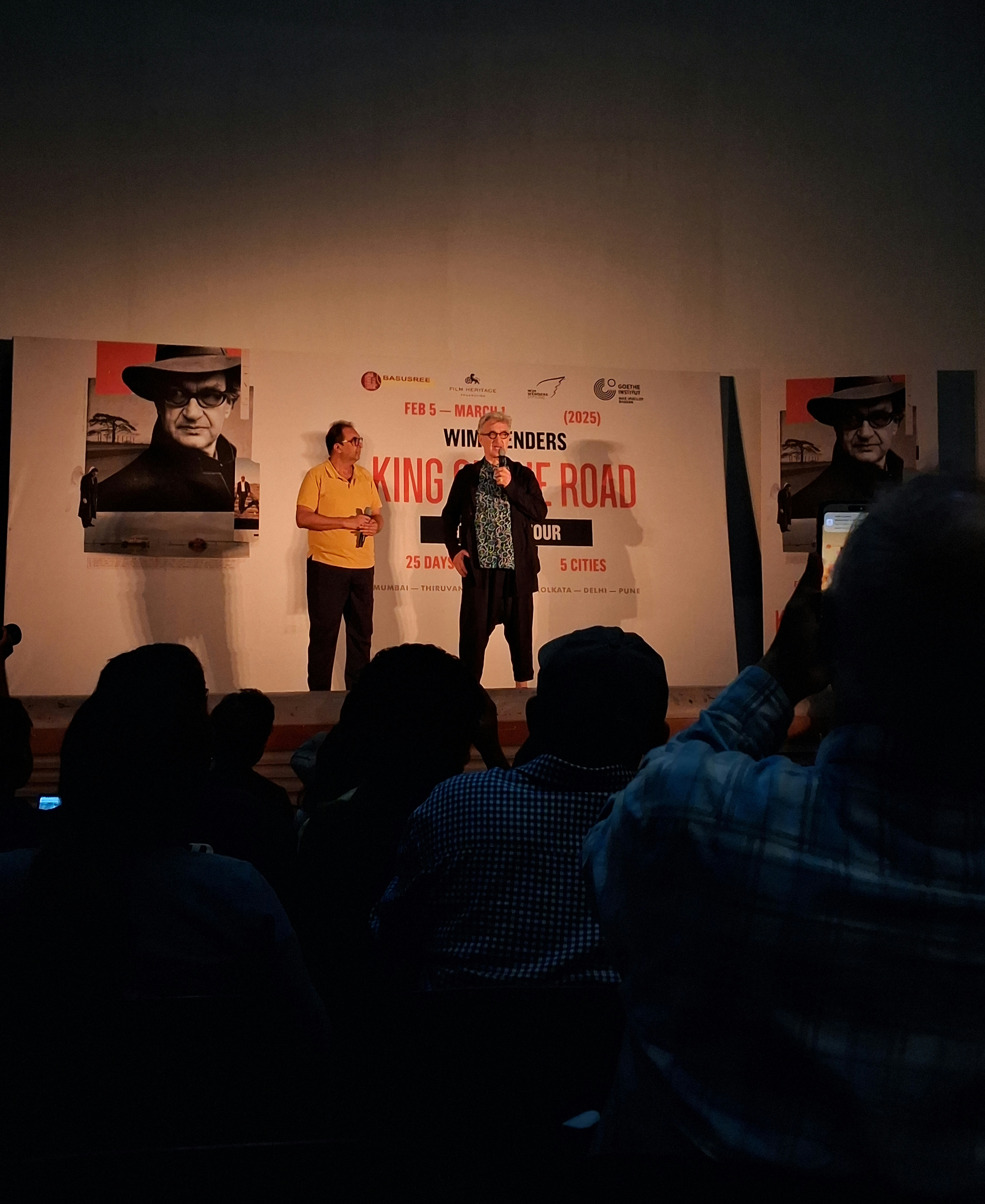
Wim Wenders addressing the audience at Basusree Cinema during the 2025 retrospective.
