= Aparajito =

1956 film by Satyajit Ray

- Theatrical release poster
- Directed by: Satyajit Ray
- Screenplay by: Satyajit Ray
- Based on: Pather Panchali and Aparajito by Bibhutibhushan Bandopadhyay
- Produced by: Satyajit Ray
- Starring: Pinaki Sengupta; Kanu Banerjee; Karuna Banerjee; Smaran Ghosal; Ramani Ranjan Sengupta; Charaprakash Ghosh; Subodh Ganguly
- Cinematography: Subrata Mitra
- Edited by: Dulal Dutta
- Music by: Ravi Shankar
- Production company: Epic Films
- Distributed by: Merchant Ivory Productions
- Release date: 11 October 1956
- Running time: 113 minutes
- Country: India
- Language: Bengali

Aparajito (pronounced [ɔpɔradʒito] Ôporajito; The Unvanquished) is a 1956 Indian Bengali-language drama film written and directed by Satyajit Ray, and is the second part of The Apu Trilogy. It is an adaptation of the last part of Bibhutibhushan Bannerjee's novel Pather Panchali and the first part of his followup novel Aparajito. The film starts off where the previous film Pather Panchali (1955) ended, with Apu's family moving to Varanasi, and chronicles Apu's life from childhood to adolescence in college.

When Ray started making Pather Panchali, he had no plans of following it up with a sequel, but the critical and commercial success of that film prompted him to start making Aparajito. Unlike his previous venture, where he stayed faithful to the novel, Ray took some bold artistic decisions here, such as portraying the relationship between Apu and his mother in a very different manner from the book. As a result, in contrast to its predecessor, the film was not received well locally; Ray recalled that "as for the suburban audience, it was shocked by the portrayal of the mother and son relationship, so sharply at variance with the conventional notion of mutual sweetness and devotion".

Critical reception outside of India, however, was overwhelmingly positive. The film won 11 international awards, including the Golden Lion and Critics Award at the Venice Film Festival, becoming the first film to ever win both awards. Veteran film-maker Mrinal Sen said he considered Aparajito to be one of the best Indian movies he had ever seen. Bosley Crowther wrote that "it is done with such rare feeling and skill at pictorial imagery, and with such sympathetic understanding of Indian character on the part of Mr. Ray, that it develops a sort of hypnotism for the serene and tolerant viewer". The critical acclaim this movie received encouraged Ray to make another sequel, Apur Sansar (1959), which was equally well received, and thus concluded one of the most critically acclaimed movie trilogies of all time, as Roger Ebert later pointed out: "The three films ... swept the top prizes at Cannes, Venice and London, and created a new cinema for India – whose prolific film industry had traditionally stayed within the narrow confines of swashbuckling musical romances. Never before had one man had such a decisive impact on the films of his culture".

== Plot ==
In 1920, Apu and his parents, who have left their home in rural Bengal, have settled into an apartment in Varanasi where his father Harihar works as a priest. Harihar is making headway in his new pursuits: praying, singing, and officiating among the ghats on the sacred river Ganges. Harihar catches a fever and soon dies, however, and his wife Sarbajaya is forced to begin work as a maid. With the assistance of a great uncle, Apu and his mother return to Bengal and settle in the village Mansapota. There Apu apprentices as a priest, but pines to attend the local school which his mother is persuaded to allow. He excels at his studies, impressing a visiting dignitary, and the headmaster takes special interest in him.

Within a few years, the teenaged Apu has done well enough to receive a scholarship to go to Kolkata for further studies. Sarbajaya feels abandoned and frightened by this, but gives in and lovingly packs his suitcase. Apu travels by train to the city and starts working at a printing press, after school hours, to subsist. He becomes more accustomed to the city life and feels out of place in the village. Sarbajaya expects visits from him, but he visits only a few times. Her loneliness and yearning for her son grow. She becomes seriously ill, but does not disclose her illness to Apu, lest his studies be disturbed. When Apu finally realises her poor health, he returns to the village to find that she has died. Bhabataran, Apu's great uncle, requests that he stay there and perform last rites of his mother. Apu replies that he will perform the last rites in Kolkata and begins his journey back to the city.

== Cast ==
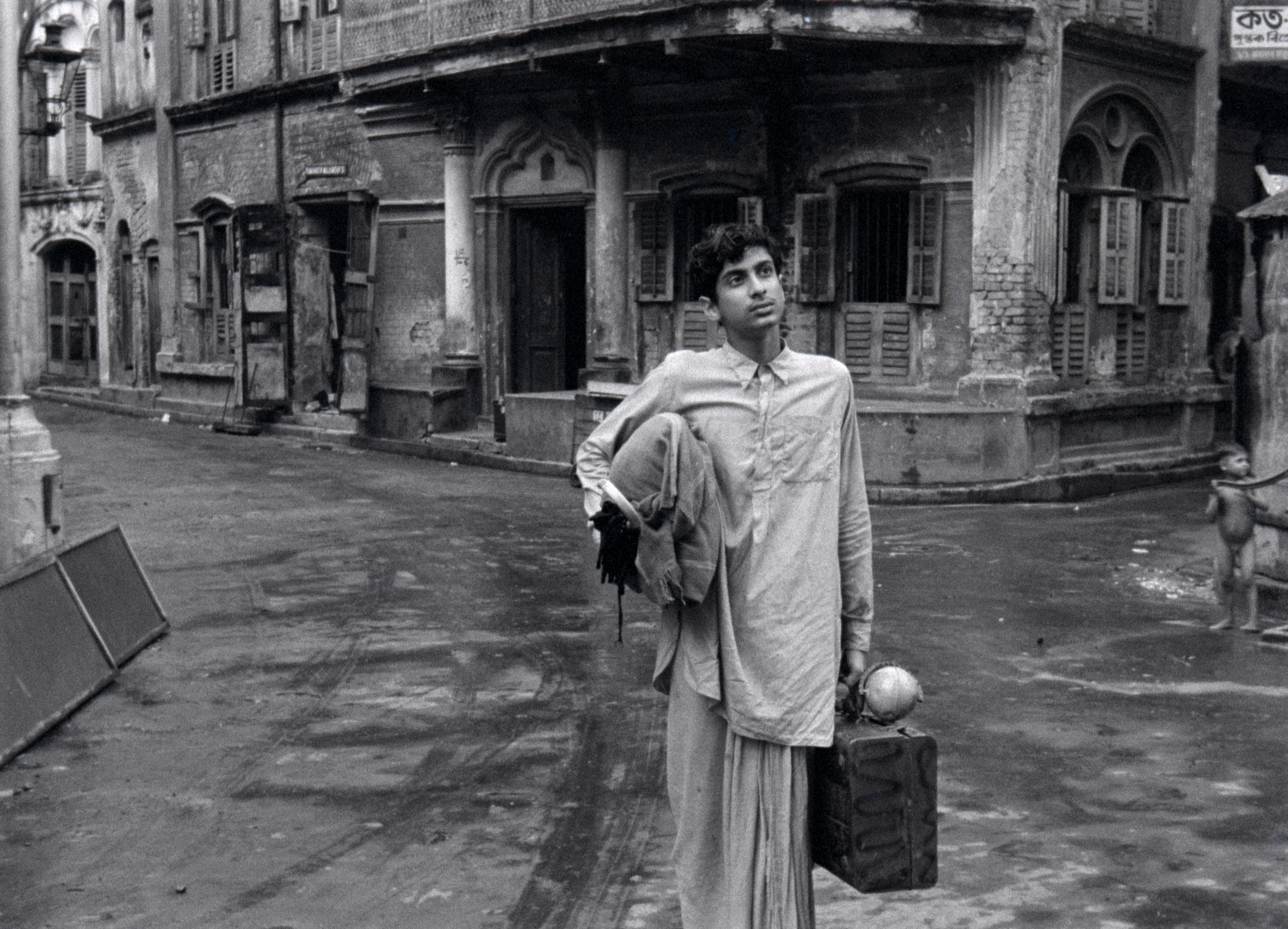
Smaran Ghosal in Aparajito

- Pinaki Sengupta as Apurba "Apu" Roy (boy)
- Smaran Ghosal as Apu (adolescent)
- Kanu Banerjee as Harihar Roy, Apu's father
- Karuna Banerjee as Sarbajaya Roy, Apu's mother
- Ramani Ranjan Sengupta as Bhabataran, Sarbajaya's uncle and Apu's great uncle
- Charu Prakash Ghosh as Nanda Babu
- Subodh Ganguly as Headmaster

== Production ==
=== Origin and development ===
Aparajito was based on the last fifth of the novel Pather Panchali and the first third of the novel Aparajito by Banerjee. The novel Pather Panchali is a classic bildungsroman (a type of coming-of-age story) in the canon of Bengali literature. It first appeared as a serial in a Calcutta periodical in 1928 and was published as a book the next year. According to Ray's biographer, Robinson, among the three films of the Apu trilogy, Aparajito bears the closest resemblance with its literary source. Banerjee's depiction of the mother-son relation fascinated Ray. Robinson writes: "Their relationship had some echoes on a purely psychological plane for him". Ray was in particular moved by Banerjee's "daring and profound revelation", that "for some time after Sarbajaya's death Apu becomes familiar with a strange sensation ... his immediate reaction had been one of pleasure, like a surge of release ... a delight in the breaking of bonds ... there was no doubt he loved his mother, but the news of her death had at first brought him pleasure—he couldn't avoid the truth". Ray's wife Bijoya also voiced her concerns when she discovered the plot, asking him "Do you think people in our country will accept a son's relief at having won his freedom at his mother's death?" Ray was aware of the risk, saying: "let's see what happens. After all, later Apu was full of regret at his initial reaction upon his mother's death. And as he realized, her death actually came as a very big blow to him".

=== Script and crew ===
The novel had a female character named Leela who influenced Apu's alienation from his mother when he was living in Calcutta. After rejecting two aspirants, Ray found one actress to portray the character, but the actress was not allowed to act in the film by her fiancé. Eventually, Ray reluctantly removed the character from the script. He later commented that he thought Leela, with whom Apu had an understated affair, was a strong reason behind Apu's attraction to Calcutta, and that, without her presence in the film, this attraction might seem to some extent artificial: "I'm never sure, whether Apu's attachment to the city without the element of the girlfriend is strong enough, the pull that the city exerts is a bit abstract". However, when he watched the movie later, he did not feel the absence of Leela.

Subrata Mitra, the cinematographer of The Apu Trilogy, made his first technical innovation with this film: the application of bounce lighting on large scale diffusers to match studio sets with location shooting. According to the Internet Encyclopedia of Cinematographers:

The fear of monsoon rain had forced the art director, Bansi Chandragupta, to abandon the original plan to build the inner courtyard of a typical Benares house in the open and the set was built inside a studio in Calcutta. Mitra recalls arguing in vain with both Chandragupta and Ray about the impossibilities of simulating shadowless diffused skylight. But this led him to innovate what became subsequently his most important tool—bounce lighting. Mitra placed a framed painter white cloth over the set resembling a patch of sky and arranged studio lights below to bounce off the fake sky.

== Critical reception ==
The film has been enthusiastically received by critics. James Berardinelli wrote:

Aparajito was filmed forty years ago, half way around the world, yet the themes and emotions embedded in the narrative are strikingly relevant to modern Western society (thus explaining why it is called a "timeless classic"). ... Aparajito is an amazing motion picture. Its rich, poetic composition is perfectly wed to the sublime emotional resonance of the narrative. For those who have seen Pather Panchali, Aparajito provides a nearly-flawless continuation of the journey begun there. Yet, for those who missed Ray's earlier effort, this film loses none of its impact. On its own or as part of the Apu Trilogy, Aparajito should not be missed.

Roger Ebert said that "the relationship between Apu and his mother observes truths that must exist in all cultures: how the parent makes sacrifices for years, only to see the child turn aside and move thoughtlessly away into adulthood. ... It is about a time, place and culture far removed from our own, and yet it connects directly and deeply with our human feelings. It is like a prayer, affirming that this is what the cinema can be, no matter how far in our cynicism we may stray".

During the Venice Film Festival, Penelope Houston, who was among the jury, broke protocol and told Ray personally: "I think it was magnificent". The chairman of the award ceremony, René Clair, was initially reluctant to give the film the festival's coveted top prize; he eventually acquiesced, but not before saying to Houston: "I hope Ray will go away and learn how to make films!" The Japanese director Akira Kurosawa had an important film entered in that year's festival competition, Throne of Blood (Kumonosu-jō), which lost to Ray's film. However, many years later, Kurosawa's daughter generated a list of 100 films admired by him; this list quoted him as having affirmed the jury's choice as "Absolutely right" (though he misidentified the winning film as Pather Panchali).

Emanuel Levy said: "Made in 1956 (and released in many countries a year later), Aparajito indicates India's processes of modernization and industrialization and their inevitable impact on both individual and culture. Nonetheless, in his upbeat outlook, Ray suggests that individuals can rise to the occasion and might not be compromised by the corruption that characterizes the society at large". Bosley Crowther, who had earlier given a lukewarm response to Pather Panchali, saying that it was so amateurish that "it would barely pass for a rough cut in Hollywood", praised Aparajito, saying that "Mr. Ray's remarkable camera catches beauty in so many things, from the softness of a mother's sad expression to the silhouette of a distant train, that innuendos take up the slack of drama. Hindu music and expressive natural sounds complete the stimulation of the senses in this strange, sad, evocative film". On Rotten Tomatoes, Aparajito has a 94% fresh rating based on an aggregate of 18 reviews, with an average rating of 8.7/10.

== Awards and nominations ==
Aparajito won the Golden Lion at the 1957 Venice Film Festival and, to date, remains the only film sequel to ever win the grand prize at the prestigious Venice, Berlin, or Cannes Film Festivals. Along with the Golden Lion, it received the Cinema Nuovo Award and the FIPRESCI Critics Award, becoming the first movie to win all three.

Ray won the Golden Gate awards for Best Picture and Best Director at the San Francisco International Film Festival in 1958, along with the Critics Award for this film.

The film won the Selznick Golden Laurel for Best Film at the Berlin International Film Festival, as well as the FIPRESCI Award and Wington Award at the British Film Institute Awards at London Film Festival. In Denmark, it won the Bodil Award for Best Non-European Film of the Year in 1967.

At the 1959 British Academy Film Awards, the film was nominated for Best Film and Karuna Banerjee was nominated for Best Foreign Actress for her role as Sarbajaya, Apu's mother.

== Accolades ==
In 1992, Sight & Sound (the British Film Institute's film magazine) ranked The Apu Trilogy at No. 88 in its Critics' Poll of all-time greatest films, while Aparajito itself was ranked separately at No. 127 on the same list. In 2002, a combined list of Sight & Sound critics' and directors' poll results included Aparajito in its top 160. In 1998, the Asian film magazine Cinemaya's critics' poll of all-time greatest films ranked The Apu Trilogy at No. 7. In 1999, The Village Voice ranked The Apu Trilogy at No. 54 in its Top 250 "Best Films of the Century" list, based on a poll of critics. In 2001, film critic Roger Ebert included The Apu Trilogy in his list of "100 Great Movies" of all time. In 2005, The Apu Trilogy was included in Time's All-Time 100 Movies list.

== Legacy ==
Smaran Ghosal, who, at the age of 14, played the role of adolescent Apu, only appeared in one more film, the documentary Rabindranath Tagore (1961), also made by Ray, in which he played a young Rabindranath Tagore. Smaran died in 2008 in Kolkata, at the age of 64.

Pather Panchali (1955), Aparajito, and Apur Sansar (The World of Apu) (1959) together constitute The Apu Trilogy. Pather Panchali portrays the childhood of Apu in his family's ancestral house. Apur Sansar depicts Apu's adult life, his reaction to his wife's premature death, and his final bonding with his son whom he abandoned as an infant. Ray did not initially plan to make a trilogy: he decided to make the third film only after being asked about the possibility of a trilogy at the 1957 Venice Film Festival, where Aparajito won the Golden Lion. Aparajito has been called the richest film of the trilogy in terms of its characterization.

According to Michael Sragow of The Atlantic Monthly in 1994: "The youthful coming-of-age dramas that have flooded art houses since the mid-fifties owe a tremendous debt to the Apu trilogy, which Terrence Rafferty has rightly called 'cinema's purest Bildungsroman'". Across the world, filmmakers such as Martin Scorsese, James Ivory, Abbas Kiarostami, Elia Kazan, and Wes Anderson have been influenced by The Apu Trilogy, with many others (such as Kurosawa) praising the work. After Aparajito, Ray went on to make 35 more films, including feature films, documentaries, and shorts. He worked on scripting, casting, scoring, cinematography, art direction, editing, and designing his own credit titles and publicity material, developing a distinctive style of film-making based on visual lyricism and strong humanism, as in his Apu trilogy, and established himself as an auteur of cinema.

== Preservation ==
The Academy Film Archive preserved the entire Apu Trilogy in 1996, including Aparajito. In 2013, the video distribution company The Criterion Collection, in collaboration with the Academy of Motion Picture Arts and Sciences' Film Archive, began the restoration of the original negatives of the Apu trilogy, including Aparajito. These negatives had been severely damaged by a fire in London in 1993, and all film cans and fragments belonging to the Ray films were sent to the Motion Picture Academy for storage, where they lay unseen for two decades. It was discovered upon reexamination that, although many parts of the films were indeed destroyed by fire or the effects of age, other parts were salvageable. The materials were shipped to a restoration laboratory in Bologna, Italy: L'Immagine Ritrovata. For those parts of the negative that were missing or unusable, duplicate negatives and fine-grain masters from various commercial or archival sources were used. The Criterion Collection's own lab then spent six months creating the digital version of all three films, at times choosing to preserve the distinctive look of the films even at the cost of retaining some imperfections.

== Bibliography ==
- Bergan, Ronald (2006). Film. Dorking Kindersley. ISBN 978-1-4053-1280-6.
- Ray, Bijoya (2012). Manik and I. Penguin. ISBN 978-0-14-341625-8.
- Gokulsing, K. Moti; Dissanayake, Wimal (2004). Indian Popular Cinema: A Narrative of Cultural Change. Trentham Books. ISBN 1-85856-329-1.
- Gokulsing, K. Moti; Dissanayake, Wimal (2013). Routledge Handbook of Indian Cinemas. Routledge. ISBN 978-1-136-77284-9.
- Gugelberger, Georg M. (1996). The Real Thing: Testimonial Discourse and Latin America. Duke University Press. ISBN 978-0-8223-1844-6.
- Ray, Satyajit (2013). Our Films, Their Films. Orient Blackswan. ISBN 978-81-250-1565-9.
- Robinson, Andrew (1989). Satyajit Ray: The Inner Eye. University of California Press. ISBN 978-0-520-06946-6.
- Robinson, A (2003). Satyajit Ray: The Inner Eye: The Biography of a Master Film-Maker. I. B. Tauris. ISBN 1-86064-965-3.
- Robinson, A (2010). The Apu Trilogy: Satyajit Ray and the Making of an Epic. Bloomsbury Publishing. ISBN 978-1-78672-962-0.
- Santas, Constantine (2002). Responding to film: A Text Guide for Students of Cinema Art. Rowman & Littlefield. ISBN 0-8304-1580-7.
- Seton, M. (2003). Portrait of a Director: Satyajit Ray. Penguin original: Film, biography. Penguin Books. ISBN 978-0-14-302972-4.
- Wood, R (1972). The Apu trilogy. November Books Ltd. ISBN 0-85631-003-4.
