= Karuna Banerjee =

Indian actress

- Karuna Banerjee in Pather Panchali (1955)
- Born: Karuna Sen; 25 December 1919; Payogram, Khulna District, Bengal Presidency, British India
- Died: 13 November 2001 (aged 81); Kolkata, West Bengal, India
- Education: University of Calcutta
- Occupation: Actress
- Spouse: Subrata Bandyopadhyay
- Awards: Nominated Best Actress; 1958 Aparajito

Karuna Banerjee (Bengali: করুণা ব্যানার্জী) (25 December 1919 – 13 November 2001) was a Bengali actress best known for her role in Satyajit Ray's The Apu Trilogy (1955–1959) as the long suffering mother, Sarbajaya. She was nominated for Best Actress at the 1959 BAFTA Awards for her performance in Aparajito (1956), the second part of The Apu Trilogy. She appeared in a number of other films after that, including Ray's Devi (1960) and Kanchenjungha (1962).

== Education ==
She graduated from the Jogamaya Devi College, an affiliated women's college of the University of Calcutta.

== Career ==
Banerjee's acting career expanded over more than two decades in Bengali cinema and theatre. She is best known for her memorable performance as Sarbajaya, the mother in the first two parts of Satyajit Ray's The Apu Trilogy: Pather Panchali (1955) and Aparajito (1956). Her performance in the latter earned her a Best Actress nomination at the 1959 BAFTA Awards. She acted in a few more films, including two more by Ray, two by Mrinal Sen, and one by Ritwik Ghatak that was never officially released.

== Filmography ==
- Mahakavi Kalidas (1942, directed by Niren Lahiri)
- Pather Panchali (1955, directed by Satyajit Ray) as Sarbojaya Ray
- Aparajito (1956, directed by Satyajit Ray) as Sarbojaya Ray
- Manmoyee Girls' School (1958, directed by Hemchandra Chunder)
- Headmaster (1959, directed by Agragami) as Labanya
- Kato Ajanare (1959, directed by Ritwik Ghatak)
- Shubha Bibaha (1959, directed by Sombhu Mitra and Amit Maitra) as Meja-boudi
- Devi (1960, directed by Satyajit Ray) as Harasundari
- Kanchenjungha (1962, directed by Satyajit Ray) as Labanya Roy Chaudhuri
- To Light a Candle (1970, directed by Shanti P. Chowdhury)
- Interview (1971, directed by Mrinal Sen) as Ma
- Calcutta 71 (1972, directed by Mrinal Sen)
- Sandhya Raag (1977, directed by Bhabendra Nath Saikia) (final film role)
