= Subir Banerjee =

Indian actor

- Born: 1946 (age 79–80); Kolkata, West Bengal
- Occupation: Actor
- Known for: Pather Panchali (film)

Subir Banerjee (born 1946 in Calcutta) is an Indian actor who played Apu in Satyajit Ray's Bengali film Pather Panchali (lit. 'Song of the Little Road', 1955), the first installment of The Apu Trilogy.

== Pather Panchali ==
During the pre-production of Pather Panchali, Satyajit Ray advertised in newspapers seeking boys between five and seven years of age for the role of Apu. Several boys arrived for the audition, but none of them met the expectation of the director. Finally, Ray's wife Bijoya Ray spotted a boy playing on the roof of a neighbouring building of their apartment. This boy, Subir Banerjee, was eventually cast for the role of Apu. Banerjee stayed at Lake Avenue in Kolkata, and later recounted his father's reluctance in allowing him take up the role. That is when Ray said, "Today, no one knows your son or me. But I'll make a film that will change Bengali cinema. Then, all of Bengal will know both of us." This convinced his father, thereafter the shooting continued from 1952 to 1954, with a year's break in between.

Andrew Robinson, in his book Satyajit Ray: The Inner Eye, describes that at the beginning of the shooting of Pather Panchali in 1952, Subir Banerjee was a "decidedly unresponsive actor". The first scene that the crew shot was a scene involving Apu and his elder sister Durga, played by another young actor Uma Dasgupta, walking through a field of kash (Saccharum spontaneum) and catching a glimpse of a train. The scene required that Apu walk haltingly, looking for his sister, who had gone ahead. However, Banerjee, without any acting experience, could not enact the halting walk. So the crew had to improvise and place small obstacles in Banerjee's path; also some crew members hid in different parts of the kash field and called Banerjee at pre-arranged times so that Banerjee looks in those directions at times, thereby giving his walk a halting and searching appearance.

The film had interrupted shooting schedules due to funding problems. One long break spanned eight months. Satyajit Ray became nervous, among other things, that the voice of Banerjee, a growing young boy, would break, thereby causing a problem in the continuity of the film. However, this did not happen.

== Later life ==
Banerjee did not appear in any film after Pather Panchali. He disappeared from the public eye. India Today, a magazine, tracked him down and published his details in an article, "Pather Panchali: An Odyssey Revisited", in March 1980. At that time, he worked as a millhand in a factory in the suburbs of Kolkata.

According to a report in NDTV, Banerjee became a clerk at a central government office, and later took voluntary retirement.

He is, as of March 2026, 78 years old and "completely detached" from films.

== In popular culture ==
Apur Panchali (2013) is a Bengali film based on Banerjee's life. Director Kaushik Ganguly won the award for best director for Apur Panchali in the 44th International Film Festival of India (IFFI) in November 2013. The director mentioned in an interview that he found similarities between certain parts of the life of Subir Banerjee and the iconic character Apu. In the film, actor Parambrata Chatterjee portrays a younger Subir Banerjee, while Ardhendu Bannerjee plays the role of the aged Banerjee.
