= Kanchenjungha =

- DVD cover
- Directed by: Satyajit Ray
- Written by: Satyajit Ray
- Produced by: Satyajit Ray
- Starring: Chhabi Biswas; Karuna Bannerjee; Anil Chatterjee; Anubha Gupta; Arun Mukherjee; Alokananda Roy; Nilima Roy Chowdhuri; Pahari Sanyal; Subrata Sensharma; Indrani Singh; N. Viswanathan
- Cinematography: Subrata Mitra
- Edited by: Dulal Dutta
- Music by: Satyajit Ray
- Production company: NCA Productions
- Distributed by: Edward Harrison(U.S.A.)
- Release date: 11 May 1962
- Running time: 102 minutes
- Country: India
- Language: Bengali

Kanchenjungha (Kanchonjônggha) is a 1962 Indian film directed by Satyajit Ray.

The film is about an upper class Bengali family on vacation in Darjeeling, a popular hill station and resort, near Kanchenjunga.

== Plot ==
A wealthy family from Calcutta is on the last day of their vacation in Darjeeling, a hill station at the foot of Mount Kanchenjungha, the second highest peak of the Himalayas. Until now, they have been unable to catch a glimpse of the peak of Kanchenjungha. The family members are dominated by the father, Indranath (Chhabi Biswas), an industrialist. He wants his daughter to marry a man of his choice and hopes that the man will propose if they are left together alone for some time.

Several long walks and long conversations form the main body of the film. The real-time drama unfolds the daughter's feelings about her father's idea, and the negative reactions to this by her mother and others. By accident, she meets an outsider, Ashoke, a young student who has refused a job offer from Indranath. Though nothing develops between them, his presence coupled with the setting of mountains and the failure of her sister's marriage prompts her to reject the proposed suitor.

At the end of his walk, the industrialist arrives at a rendezvous point, expecting to meet his family and the successful suitor. None of them is present to greet him. As the mist clears, the peak of Kanchenjungha is revealed in its full glory. But Indranath is too pre-occupied to admire it.

== Cast ==
- Chhabi Biswas: Indranath Roy
- Karuna Banerjee: Labanya, wife
- Anil Chatterjee: Anil, son
- Alokananda Roy: Monisha, unmarried daughter
- Anubha Gupta: Anima, elder daughter
- Arun Mukherjee: Ashoke, young man from Calcutta
- Subrata Sen: Sankar
- Sibani Singh: Tuklu
- Vidya Singh: Anil's girlfriend

*Pahari Sanyal: Jagadish

- N. Viswanathan: Bannerjee

== Production ==
Kanchenjungha was Ray's first original screenplay and for the first time, he was shooting in color. The film shows about 100 minutes (in real time) in the life of a group of rich Bengalis on vacation. Unlike the usual Ray films, it has a linear narrative with no central characters, and no straight narrative in the classical sense.

It is a very structured and composed film that uses color and nature to heighten the drama. Ray told his biographer Andrew Robinson: "The idea was to have the film starting with sunlight. Then clouds coming, then mist rising, and then mist disappearing, the cloud disappearing, and then the sun shining on the snow-peaks. There is an independent progression to Nature itself, and the story reflects this."

As the weather becomes misty - the young daughter and the suitor part at that point, Indranath meets Ashoke, and the elder daughter, Anima and her husband have a bitter moment between them. And then when the sun appears again - Anima's daughter comes back to her parents and they accept her, the misunderstanding is cleared up, and the younger daughter and Ashoke develop a tentative relationship with a hint of future prospects.

== Analysis ==
=== Narrative structure ===
The structure of the film contrasts a primary plot with a secondary plot. The secondary plot involves two characters, largely static, and is played out in scenes involving only them. The primary plot pulls in most of the characters, in various groups coming together and breaking apart, across many different locations, as they all walk the circular path rising and falling over the mountainside.

The film happens in linear realtime, i.e. the runtime of the film covers events happening over approximately the same period. However frequent inter-cutting between the different groups fractures this linearity, as does the thematically opposed trajectories of the two plots, one proceeding from family to the individual while the other proceeds from the individual to the family.

However there are elements cutting across this chopped up structure. The youngest child of the family, riding in circles and singing a counting rhyme, keeps moving across the background of the scenes like a metronome. The shifting states of weather are a constant backdrop, anchoring everything in time. In the end the climax of all trajectories is capped by the snowy peaks of Kanchenjungha finally appearing out of the clouds, suggesting an underlying unity of everybody's private struggles and their resolutions.

=== Characters ===
The characters and the Nature are interrelated in mood. In his later film Asani Sanket (Distant Thunder, 1973), Ray attempted quite the opposite. While the Nature is shown in its full glory and lushness, in contrast, the characters starve and do inhuman things.

As the characters do not change their clothes during the film (it being depiction of a real time event that happens in 100 odd minutes), the colors of clothes too add a dimension to the characters.

About Kanchenjungha, Ray told in an interview to Cineaste magazine, "(It was) a very personal film. It was a good ten to fifteen years ahead of its time... Kanchenjungha told the story of several groups of characters and it went back and forth. ... It's a very musical form, but it wasn't liked. The reaction was stupid. Even the reviews were not interesting. But, looking back now, I find that it is a very interesting film."

== Adaptation ==
Year	Title	Director	Cast	Note	Ref.
1972	Kanchenjunga	Ajitesh Bandyopadhyay	Bikash Roy, Nirmal Kumar	Bikash Roy played Indranath in this radio drama.	

== Trivia ==
Abar Kanchanjungha (2022) pays homage to Ray and the film.
