= Kanu Banerjee =

Indian actor and director (1905–1983)

- Kanu Banerjee in Pather Panchali (1955)
- Born: 20 June 1905; Jodhpur, Jodhpur State, British India
- Died: 27 January 1983 (aged 77); Calcutta, India
- Occupations: Theatre actor and director
- Notable work: Pather Panchali (1955); Aparajito (1956)

Kanu Banerjee (Kanu Bandyopadhyay; 20 June 1905 – 27 January 1983) was an Indian actor and director of Bengali cinema and theatre. He was best known for his portrayal of Harihar Ray, father of Apu, in Satyajit Ray's classic Pather Panchali (1955) and Aparajito (1956), part of the Apu Trilogy.

== Early life and career ==
He was born in Jodhpur, Rajasthan, India. He first appeared as an amateur artiste with Sisir Kumar Bhaduri in Biraj Bou (1934) as Netai at Naba Natyyamandir. In 1955, he also appeared as saint Ramakrishna in Prafulla Chakraborty's biographical film Bhagaban Sri Sri Ramakrishna.

== Legacy ==
In 2012, his memoirs titled, Hariharer Panchali, based on his long interview published in Sharadiya (Durga puja) magazine Baro Maas in 1979 and other interviews was published by Sutradhar and released by Sandip Ray, son of Satyajit Ray, at Nandan theater in Kolkata. Previously, on 20 June 2012, on the occasion of his 108th birth anniversary, his statue was unveiled on Banamali Chatterjee Street in Tala neighbourhood of North Kolkata, where he used to stay.

== Filmography ==
- Krishnakanter Will (1926)
- Durgesh Nandini (1927)
- Rajgee (1937) - Ramjadu
- Desher Mati (1938)
- Chanakya (1939) - Kaulak
- Rikta (1939)
- Shap Mukti (1940) - Astrologer
- Mayer Pran (1941)
- Epar Opar (1941) - Charan
- Nandini (1941)
- Pashan Devata (1942)
- Garmil (1942) - Nilmani Ghatak
- Avayer Biye (1942)
- Sahar Thekey Durey (1943)
- Dampati (1943)
- Sahadharmini (1943)
- Jogajog (1943) - Jayanta's friend
- Bideshini (1944)
- Nandita (1944)
- Pratikar (1944)
- Kato Door (1945)
- Bhabhi Kaal (1945)
- Mane Na Mane (1945) - Priest
- Grihalakhmi (1945)
- Mandir (1946)
- Swapna-o-Sadhana (1947)
- Purabi (1948)
- Jayjatra (1948)
- Sadharan Meye (1948)
- Abhijatya (1949)
- Kuasha (1949)
- Mandanda (1950)
- Baikunther Will (1950)
- Digbhranta (1950)
- Pandit Mashai (1951)
- Bindur Chhele (1952) - Priyababu
- Palli Samaj (1952)
- Siraj-Ud-Dowla (1952)
- Natun Yahudi (1953)
- Champadangar Bou (1954) - Setap Moral
- Mantra Shakti (1954)
- Moner Mayur (1954)
- Sadanander Mela (1954) - Jagadish
- Bhangagara (1954) - Biren (Sulata's brother)
- Dukhir Imaan (1954)
- Bir Hambir (1955)
- Sajher Pradip (1955)
- Pather Panchali (1955) - Harihar Ray
- Upahar (1955) - Kangalibabu
- Aparadhi (1955)
- Bhagavan Sri Ramakrishna (1955)
- Tonsil (1956)
- Aparajito (1956) - Harihar Ray
- Saheb Bibi Golam (1956)
- Nabajanma (1956)
- Bhola Master (1956)
- Daner Maryada (1956) - Prasanna Babu
- Subharatri (1956)
- Punar Milan (1957)
- Neelachaley Mahaprabhu (1957)
- Marmabani (1958)
- Pankatilak (1961)
- Kathin Maya (1961)
- Aaj Kal Parshu (1961)
- Ke Tumi? (1964)
- Mahashweta (1967) - Pandit Moshai (Mahashweta's father)
- Banajyotsna (1969)
- Eai Korecho Bhalo (1970) - Abhayankar
- Alo Amar Alo (1971) - Atashi's father
- Agnibhramar (1973) - (final film role)
