= My Years with Apu =

Memoir by Satyajit Ray

My Years with Apu: A Memoir, first published in 1994, is a memoir by the Indian film director Satyajit Ray.

== Synopsis ==
The memoir describes Ray's experience and thoughts during the making of the acclaimed Apu Trilogy.

== Publication history ==
The book was published posthumously two years after his death.

== Reception ==
It garnered praise for its "fascinating account" on making the trilogy.

== See also ==
- Cinema of India
- Modernist film
- Social realism
