= Subrata Mitra =

Indian cinematographer

- Born: 12 October 1930; Kolkata, West Bengal, India
- Died: 7 December 2001 (aged 71); Kolkata, West Bengal, India
- Awards: Padma Shri
- Scientific career
- Fields: Photography & Cinematography

Subrata Mitra (12 October 1930 – 7 December 2001) was an Indian cinematographer. Acclaimed for his work in The Apu Trilogy (1955–1959), Mitra often is considered one of the greatest Indian cinematographers.

== Early life and education ==
Mitra was born in Calcutta, Bengal (now Kolkata, West Bengal) to Shanti and Sudhangshu Bhushan Mitra. He was a great-grandson, on his paternal grandmother's side, of the orientalist Brajendranath Dey. He was a younger cousin of the singer Uma Bose and a nephew, even though he was older than him, of the historian Barun Dey. He was educated at Ballygunge Government High School, Kolkata.

== Work ==
At the age of 21, Mitra, who never had operated a motion picture camera, began his career as a cinematographer with Satyajit Ray, the legendary Indian film maker, for Pather Panchali (1955). He continued to work with him for many of Ray's later films. He is known for pioneering the technique of bounce lighting while filming The Apu Trilogy.

== Innovations ==
Satyajit Ray thought that "Subrata Mitra’s camera work is better than Raoul Coutard’s". At the time, Coutard was much more acclaimed than Mitra, having collaborated with Godard on many of his film projects. One of his most important technical innovations was his application of bounce lighting, pioneering the use of large scale diffusers to match studio lighting with location shooting. According to the Internet Encyclopedia of Cinematographers:

Mitra made his first technical innovation while shooting Aparajito. The fear of monsoon rain had forced the art director, Bansi Chandragupta, to abandon the original plan to build the inner courtyard of a typical Benares house in the open and the set was built inside a studio in Calcutta. Mitra recalls arguing in vain with both Chandragupta and Ray about the impossibilities of simulating shadowless diffused skylight. But this led him to innovate what became subsequently his most important tool - bounce lighting. Mitra placed a framed painter white cloth over the set resembling a patch of sky and arranged studio lights below to bounce off the fake sky.

Director Satyajit Ray also stated:

You know, about seven or eight years after Pather Panchali was made, I read an article in American Cinematographer written by Sven Nykvist — at the time of Bergman's Through a Glass Darkly, I think — claiming the invention of bounced light. But we had been using it since 1954.

Both Satyajit Ray and Subrata Mitra were greatly influenced by the photography of Henri Cartier-Bresson, in particular his use of natural light. The other great influence was Jean Renoir and it was in fact during the shooting of his film The River, the pair met in its sets.

Commenting on his own photography, Mitra said:

"Every cameraman has his own method of work innovated by his own conviction, taste, etc. One cameraman believes that he can please his audience and himself by glamourising the heroine only; another one believes that the main object of lighting and photography is to create various moods and feelings."

"I feel my most important technical innovation is the use of 'bounce lighting', induced by my love for naturalistic lighting."

"An actor can overact or underact. This equally applies to lighting and cameraman. He has to observe restraint in his work like the actor. I feel that in my own work I have a tendency to 'underact.'"

"My experience in Pather Panchali were rather unusual, because before this I had never touched a movie camera or even worked as an assistant to a cameraman...Almost every shot of Pather Panchali posed a problem for me, innumerable problems, many sleepless nights spent on ruminating over the prospects of the next day's shooting...Pather Panchali had many excellent shots--both technically and artistically, but it had many bad shots too."

== Post-retirement ==
From 1997 until his death, Mitra was an emeritus professor of cinematography at the Satyajit Ray Film and Television Institute (SRFTI) at Kolkata.

== Filmography ==
- 1955 : Pather Panchali - Directed: Satyajit Ray
- 1956: Aparajito - Directed: Satyajit Ray
- 1957: Parash Pathar - Directed: Satyajit Ray
- 1958: Jalsaghar - Directed: Satyajit Ray
- 1959: Apur Sansar - Directed: Satyajit Ray
- 1960: Devi - Directed: Satyajit Ray
- 1962: Kanchenjungha - Directed: Satyajit Ray
- 1963: The Householder - Directed: James Ivory
- 1963: Mahanagar - Directed: Satyajit Ray
- 1964: Charulata - Directed: Satyajit Ray
- 1965: Shakespeare Wallah - Directed: James Ivory
- 1966: Nayak - Directed: Satyajit Ray
- 1966: Teesri Kasam - Directed: Basu Bhattacharya
- 1969: The Arch - Directed: Tang Shu Shuen
- 1969: The Guru - Directed: James Ivory
- 1970: Bombay Talkie - Directed: James Ivory
- 1974: Mahatma and the Mad Boy - Directed: Ismail Merchant
- 1985: New Delhi Times - Directed: Ramesh Sharma

== Awards ==
- 1986: National Film Award for Best Cinematography : New Delhi Times
- 1986: Padma Shri
- 1992: Eastman Kodak Lifetime Achievement Award for Excellence in Cinematography
