= Travels in the Scriptorium =

2006 novel by Paul Auster

- First edition
- Author: Paul Auster
- Language: English
- Genre: Metafiction
- Publisher: Henry Holt and Co.
- Publication date: 2006
- Publication place: United States
- Media type: Print (hardback & paperback)
- Pages: 160 pp
- ISBN: 0-8050-8145-3
- OCLC: 62421289
- Dewey Decimal: 813/.54 22
- LC Class: PS3551.U77 T73 2007
- Preceded by: The Brooklyn Follies
- Followed by: Man in the Dark

Travels in the Scriptorium is a novel by Paul Auster first published in 2006.

Elements from most past Auster novels all converge in this book: every character other than the protagonist, Mr. Blank, is taken from a previous novel, with yet more characters mentioned peripherally.

== Plot ==
An old man is disoriented within an unknown chamber and has no memory about who he is or how he has arrived there. He tries to understand something from the relics on the desk, examining the circumstances of his confinement and searching for reasons and a method to exit.

Determining that he is locked in, the man — identified only as Mr. Blank — begins reading a manuscript he finds on the desk, the story of another prisoner, set in an alternate world the man doesn't recognize. Nevertheless, the pages seem to have been left for him, along with a haunting set of photographs. As the day passes, various characters call on the man in his cell — vaguely familiar people, some who seem to resent him for crimes he can't remember — and each brings frustrating hints of his identity and his past. All the while an overhead camera clicks and clicks, recording his movements, and a microphone records every sound in the room. Someone is watching.

== See also ==
- Scriptorium
- Waiting for the Barbarians

== Reviews ==
- "Mr Writer Man": a review in the TLS by Deborah Friedell, October 2006.
- Travels in the Scriptorium by Paul Auster, Strange Horizons
- "Sure Shot, or a Round of Blanks?": a review for WritersNewsWeekly.com by Jeff LeJeune, May 2008.
