= 12th British Academy Film Awards =

1959 film awards ceremony

- Date: 1959

Highlights
- Best Film: Room at the Top
- Best British Film: Room at the Top
- Most awards: Orders to Kill and Room at the Top (3)
- Most nominations: Room at the Top (7)

The 12th British Academy Film Awards, given by the British Academy of Film and Television Arts in 1959, honoured the best films of 1958.

== Winners and nominees ==
=== Best Film ===
Room at the Top

- Aparajito
- Cat on a Hot Tin Roof
- The Cranes Are Flying
- The Defiant Ones
- Ice Cold in Alex
- Indiscreet
- Le Notti di Cabiria
- No Down Payment
- Orders to Kill
- Sea of Sand
- The Sheepman
- Wild Strawberries
- The Young Lions

=== Best British Film ===
Room at the Top

- Ice Cold in Alex
- Indiscreet
- Orders to Kill
- Sea of Sand

=== Best Foreign Actor ===
Sidney Poitier in The Defiant Ones

- Paul Newman in Cat on a Hot Tin Roof
- Tony Curtis in The Defiant Ones
- Curd Jürgens in The Enemy Below
- Curd Jürgens in The Inn of the Sixth Happiness
- Spencer Tracy in The Last Hurrah
- Glenn Ford in The Sheepman
- Victor Sjöström in Wild Strawberries
- Charles Laughton in Witness for the Prosecution
- Marlon Brando in The Young Lions

=== Best British Actor ===
Trevor Howard in The Key

- I. S. Johar in Harry Black
- Anthony Quayle in Ice Cold in Alex
- Laurence Harvey in Room at the Top
- Donald Wolfit in Room at the Top
- Michael Craig in Sea of Sand
- Terry-Thomas in tom thumb

=== Best British Actress ===
Irene Worth in Orders to Kill

- Virginia McKenna in Carve Her Name with Pride
- Elizabeth Taylor in Cat on a Hot Tin Roof
- Hermione Baddeley in Room at the Top

=== Best Foreign Actress ===
Simone Signoret in Room at the Top

- Karuna Banerjee in Aparajito
- Tatiana Samoilova in The Cranes Are Flying
- Ingrid Bergman in The Inn of the Sixth Happiness
- Giulietta Masina in Nights of Cabiria
- Joanne Woodward in No Down Payment
- Anna Magnani in Wild Is the Wind

=== Best British Screenplay ===
Orders to Kill – Paul Dehn
