= Chunibala Devi =

Indian actress

- Born: 1872
- Died: 1955 (aged 82–83)
- Occupation: Actress
- Known for: Pather Panchali

Chunibala Devi (c. 1872–1955) was an Indian character actress best known for her performance in Satyajit Ray's Pather Panchali, where she played the old aunt, Indir Thakrun, to Apu and Durga. She was awarded Best Actress for the role in the 1st Manila Film Festival in 1966, almost 11 years after her death.

== Life and Career ==
Formerly a theatre actress, Chunibala Devi made her film debut with Bigraha in 1930, though after her second film, Rikta in 1939 she retired. She also acted in Natir Puja in 1932 directed by Rabindranath Tagore. She was brought out of her retirement at the age of 80 by Satyajit Ray to act in the pivotal role of her career.

== Awards ==
She was awarded posthumously the best actress at 1st Manila Film Festival for her role of Indir Thakrun in Pather Panchali in 1966, after almost 11 years of the film's release.

== Death ==
She died in Kolkata, of influenza, in 1955, before the release of Pather Panchali, although Ray had been to her house to show her a projection.

== Filmography ==
- Bigraha – The God and the Image (1930)
- Rikta (1939)
- Pather Panchali – Song of the Road (1955)
