= Man in the Dark (novel) =

2008 novel by Paul Auster

- First edition
- Author: Paul Auster
- Language: English
- Publisher: Henry Holt and Co.
- Publication date: August 19, 2008
- Publication place: United States
- Media type: Print (Hardback) and Audio CD
- Pages: 180 pp
- ISBN: 978-0-571-24076-0
- OCLC: 229464027
- Preceded by: Travels in the Scriptorium
- Followed by: Invisible

Man in the Dark is a novel by Paul Auster published in August 2008. Its topic is a dystopian scenario of the present-day United States being torn apart by a new secession and civil war after the presidential elections of 2000. (The fictional division between the secessionist and loyal states is very similar to the "Jesusland" map.) This is told within a frame narrative of an aging journalist reflecting on his family and the death of his wife.

== Editions ==
- Man in the Dark, Henry Holt and Co. 2008. ISBN 978-0-571-24076-0

== Reviews ==
- California Literary Review, by Garan Holcombe
- San Francisco Chronicle, by Stephen Elliott
- The Telegraph, by Ruth Scurr
- The New York Review of Books, by Michael Dirda
- The Washington Post, by Jeff Turrentine (Washington Post Best Books of the Year)
