= Time's All-Time 100 Movies =

List of greatest films from 1923 to 2005

Time's All-Time 100 Movies is a list compiled by Time magazine of the 100 "greatest" films that were released between March 3, 1923—when the first issue of Time was published—and early 2005, when the list was compiled. Compiled by critics Richard Schickel and Richard Corliss, the list generated significant attention, receiving 7.8 million hits in its first week alone.

== The list ==
There are 106 films in this list, with Olympia (1938; directed by Leni Riefenstahl), The Apu Trilogy (1955, 1956, 1959; Satyajit Ray), The Godfather and The Godfather Part II (1972, 1974; Francis Ford Coppola), and The Lord of the Rings film trilogy (2001–03; Peter Jackson) each listed as single entries. Riefenstahl's film is also the only one out of the 100 that was not directed by a man.

Martin Scorsese also had three films on the list: Taxi Driver (1976), Raging Bull (1980), and Goodfellas (1990). More than any other actor, Robert De Niro had five of his films on the list, including the three directed by Scorsese. Ingmar Bergman, Stanley Donen, Alfred Hitchcock, Elia Kazan, Stanley Kubrick, Akira Kurosawa, Sergio Leone, Ernst Lubitsch, Kenji Mizoguchi, Yasujirō Ozu, Steven Spielberg, François Truffaut, Billy Wilder, and William Wyler all had two films each on the list.

Films on the list span a period of 80 years, starting with Sherlock Jr. (1924) directed by Buster Keaton, and finishing with Finding Nemo (2003) directed by Andrew Stanton. Of the 33 films in the list that were released before 1950, only 6 were produced outside Hollywood, and 13 of those 27 American films were directed by men born abroad:

- three in England (Alfred Hitchcock, Charlie Chaplin, and James Whale)
- three in Germany (William Wyler, Ernst Lubitsch, and F. W. Murnau)
- three in Austria (Billy Wilder, Josef von Sternberg, and Edgar G. Ulmer)
- one in Hungary (Michael Curtiz)
- one in France (Jacques Tourneur)
- one in Italy (Frank Capra)

Of the 11 non-Caucasian directors, all were of Asian descent: Japanese, Chinese, or Indian.

=== Supplementary lists ===
The list is also complemented by three sidebars, each with 10 contributions by Richard Schickel and Richard Corliss. These sections are:

- "10 Best Soundtracks" — A. R. Rahman's Roja (2004) was the only debut album in the list
- "Great Performances" — a top-10 list of acting performances
- "Guilty Pleasures" — a top-10 list of 'guilty pleasure' films

== Method ==
Richard Schickel and Richard Corliss each compiled a list of 115–120 films that they judged worthy of inclusion and weighed each choice until they agreed on the top 100. The process took about four months. An effort was made to make the list as diverse as possible in terms of directors, actors, countries, and genres represented.

== Reception ==
According to Richard Corliss, the list's web pages "attracted a record-busting 7.8 million page views in its first week, including 3.5 million on May 23, its opening day. Thousands of readers have written in to cheer or challenge our selections, and thousands more have voted for their own favorites. The response simply underscores Richard's and my long-held belief that everybody has two jobs: his own and movie critic."

== See also ==
- AFI's 100 Years...100 Movies
- List of films voted the best
