= Pather Panchali (novel) =

Book by Bibhutibhushan Bandyopadhyay

- Author: Bibhutibhushan Bandyopadhyay
- Language: Bengali
- Series: Bichitra
- Genre: Bildungsroman, tragedy, family drama
- Publisher: Ranjan Prakashalay, BY 1336,
- Publication date: BY 1336, CE 1929
- Publication place: British India
- Followed by: Aparajito

Pather Panchali (Pôther Pãchali; transl. Song of the Little Road) is a 1929 novel written by Bibhutibhushan Bandyopadhyay and was later adapted into a 1955 film of the same name by Satyajit Ray. Considered to be one of the greatest literary works describing rural life, Pather Panchali deals with the life of the Roy family, both in their ancestral village in rural Bengal and later when they move to Varanasi in search of a better life, as well as the anguish and loss they face during their travels.

== History ==
It first appeared as a serial in a Calcutta periodical in 1928 and was published as a book the next year; it was the first published novel written by the author. It was followed in 1932 by a sequel Aparajito, which was adapted into a 1956 film of the same name by Satyajit Ray.

== Plot ==
Horihor Roy, an impoverished Brahmin, lives in the village of Nischindipur. Indir Thakrun, an old widowed woman, who had nobody to look after her, takes shelter in the house of Horihor, to whom she is distantly related. Horihor's wife Shorbojoya, an ill-tempered lady, cannot bear the sight of the old woman. She is therefore given a tumble-down thatched hut to live in. However, Durga, Shorbojoya's six-year-old daughter, is very fond of Indir Thakrun and stays with her for hours to listen to fairy-tales.

After some time, Shorbojoya gives birth to a son. Shorbojoya is jealous of Indir Thakrun as she thinks that Durga is more fond of the old woman than of her mother. Indir Thakrun is mercilessly turned out of the hut for a trifling reason. The helpless old woman implores for shelter in her dying moments but she is heartlessly refused; she passes away in a rice-barn.

Four or five years later, the boy named Apu grows up to be very inquisitive and sensitive to the beauty and mystery of nature. He and his elder sister Durga are always out for some new adventures like roaming through the forests, taking part in indigenous games and plucking flowers and fruits stealthily. Apu is admitted into the village school where many village elders assemble and talk on diverse subjects. Apu is taken by his father to a client's house. It is the first time that Apu gets a glimpse of the outside world which fills his mind with joy and excitement. The village festivity, the fair, and the Jatra performance, all bring variety and thrill to the monotonous flow of village life. Durga, restless yet innocent, dies suddenly, plunging the whole family into grief and leaving her little brother all alone. Horihor leaves home for a long period and struggles desperately to earn a livelihood. After returning home he decides to leave Nischindipur. They pack up and go to the railway station. As the train steams in, they board the train leaving behind Nischindipur forever with its many sweet and sour memories.

== Translations ==
Pather Panchali was translated first to Telugu under the same name by Maddipatla Suri in 1960 and published. It was translated to Sinhalese under the name Mawathe Geethaya by Chintha Lakshmi Sinhaarachchi and published in 1986. This was immensely popular in Sri Lanka and was followed by the translations of the other two books of the Apu trilogy by the same translator.

Pather Panchali was translated into Malayalam under the name, Pather Panchali - Paathayuday Sangeetham by Mr M. K. N. Potty, which was first published in April 2009 by Green Books Pvt Ltd., Trichur, Kerala.

An English translation by T. W. Clark and Tarapada Mukherji was published in 1968 by Indiana University Press as part of the UNESCO Collection of Representative Works, and an abridged translation by K. Roy and Margaret Chatterjee followed in 1976.

An adaptation for radio by Tanika Gupta was broadcast on BBC Radio 4 on 24 February & 3 March 2013 as a "Classic Serial".
