= Banarsidas Chaturvedi =

Indian Hindi-language writer (1892–1985)

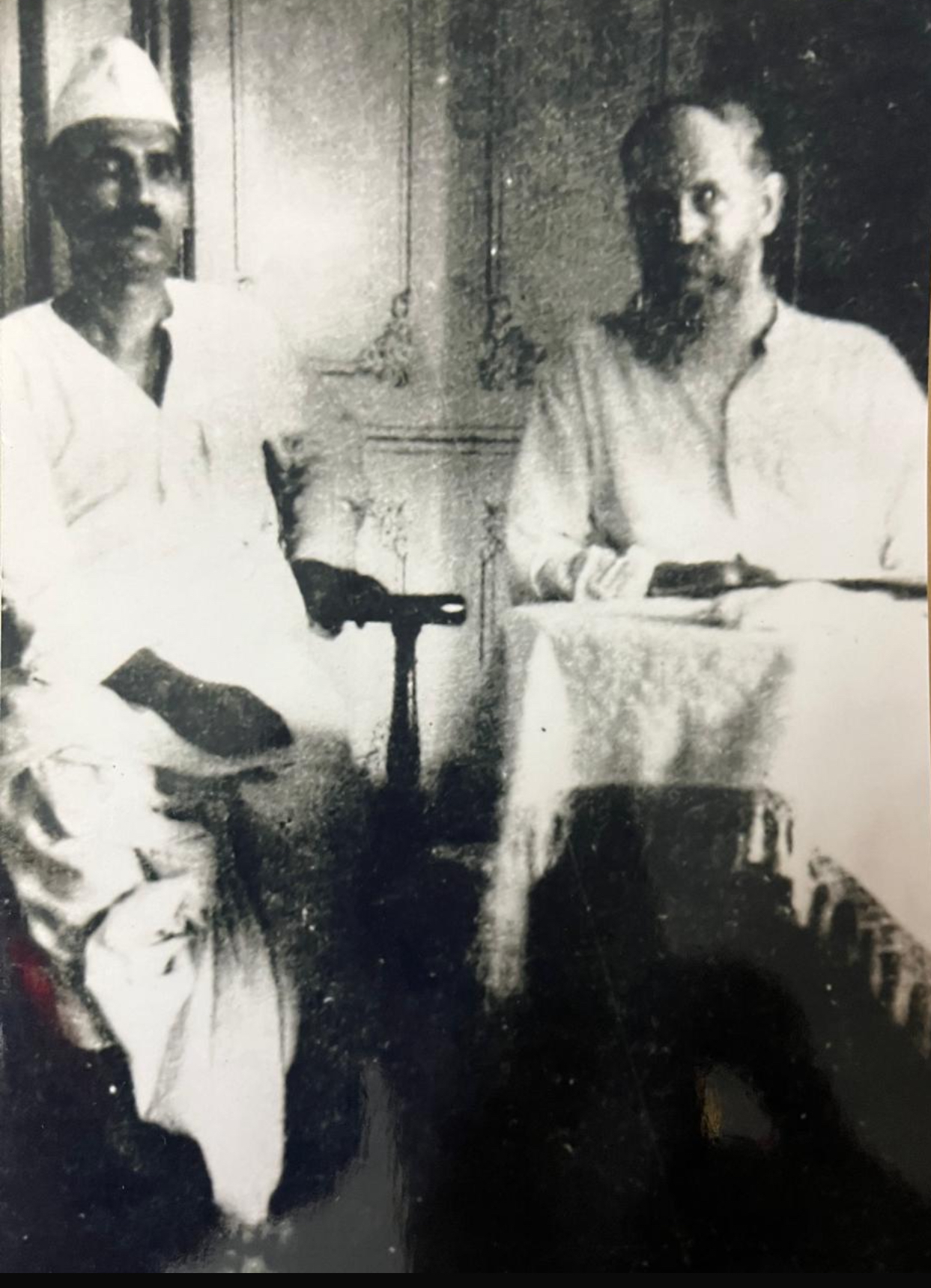
Banarsidas Chaturvedi ji with Deenbandhu Charles Freer Andrews Courtesy: Dr. Nikhil Chaturvedi (Agra)

Banarsidas Chaturvedi (24 December 1892 – 2 May 1985) was a Hindi-language writer and journalist. He received the Padma Bhushan from the Government of India in 1973. He was born in Firozabad in the North-Western Provinces of British India. His work connected themes of nationalism, social reform, and the experiences of Indians overseas. He was associated with India's cultural and political movements and with intellectuals, reformers, and writers of his time. These associations influenced his writing and contributed to his role in Hindi literature and Indian public life.

== Early life ==
Banarsidas Chaturvedi was born on 24 December 1892 in Firozabad, Uttar Pradesh, India. He was the son of Pandit Ganeshilal Chaube (1852–24 December 1944), a village schoolteacher. He married Chhabili Devi Chaturvedi in 1912.

He began his education in 1900 and passed his First Arts (FA) examination in 1913. He received a scholarship from Chaube Boarding House in Agra, which was run by Raja Jai Kishan Das. He passed the examination in English with first-class honours, but could not continue his college education because of financial constraints. He graduated at the top of his class and received an award from Madan Mohan Malviya. His first article, "Svavlamban", was published in Navjeevan magazine in 1912.

He began teaching at a government high school in Farrukhabad for a monthly salary of Rs. 30. He later became a teacher at Daly College in Indore. While he was teaching at the college, the annual session of the Hindi Sahitya Sammelan was held in Indore under the presidency of Mahatma Gandhi. During this period, Chaturvedi came into contact with Gandhi and prominent literary figures. As a journalist, he considered Ganesh Shankar Vidyarthi his role model.

Chaturvedi gave an interview to Doordarshan about his life and works. It is available in the Prasar Bharti Archives.

== Career ==
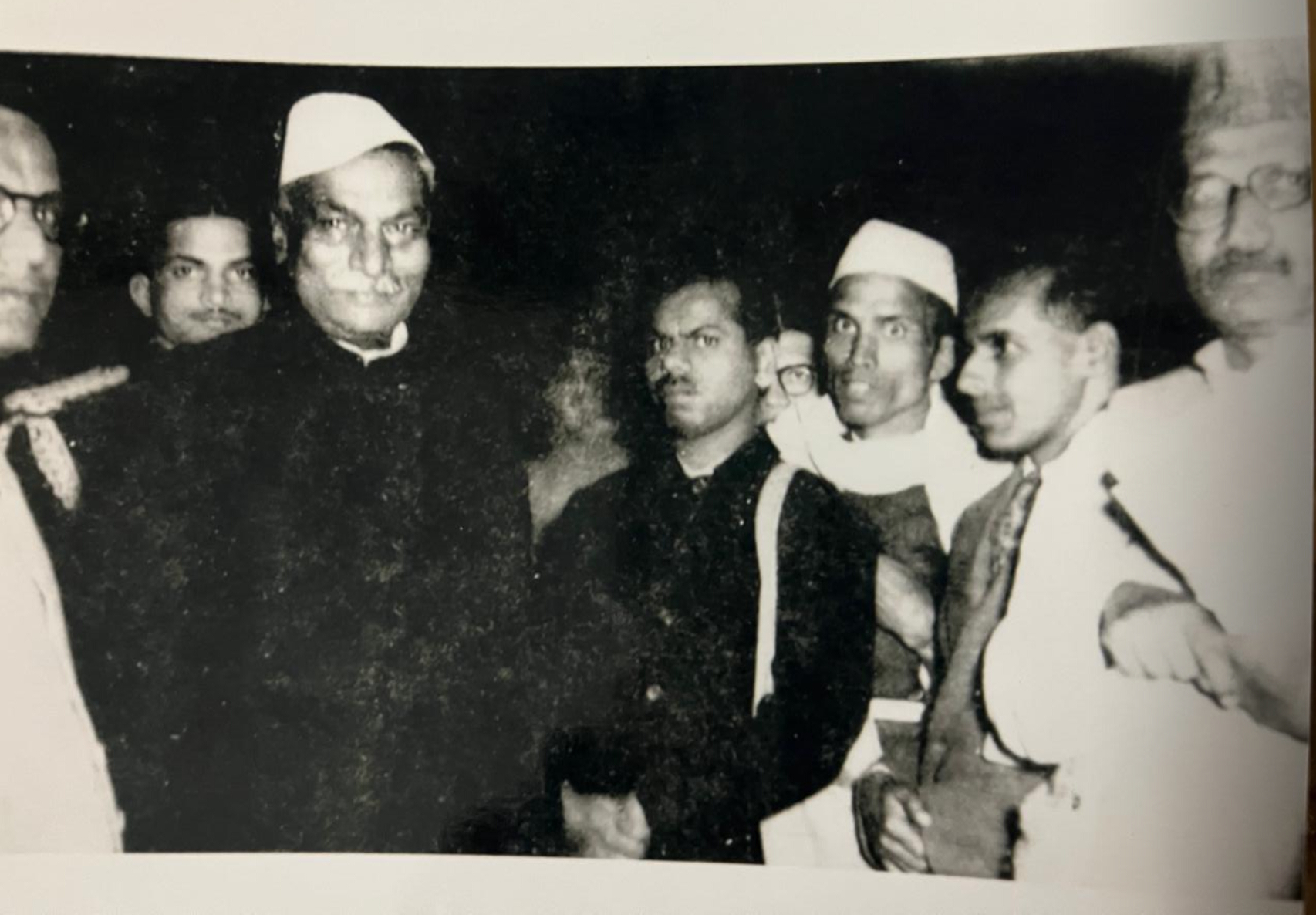
Banarsidas ji with Dr Rajendra Prasad Courtesy: Dr. Nikhil Chaturvedi (Agra)

Chaturvedi's journalism career began with the editorship of the magazine Vishal Bharat. Ramananda Chatterjee, who owned Modern Review and Vishal Bharat, was impressed by Chaturvedi's work. While living in Calcutta, Chaturvedi became acquainted with prominent national leaders. He had a special interest in issues facing overseas Indians, which brought him into contact with Mahatma Gandhi, C.F. Andrews, and Srinivasa Sastri, who were also connected with issues faced by the Indian diaspora.

Chaturvedi went to Shantiniketan with C.F. Andrews. At Gandhi's suggestion, he later became a teacher at Gujarat Vidyapith in Ahmedabad, though he did not stay there for long and left teaching in 1920. He developed Vishal Bharat into a monthly magazine covering literature and general knowledge. Works by leading writers of the time were published in its columns.

After leaving Vishal Bharat, Chaturvedi began editing Madhukar from Tikamgarh.

== Abolition of indentured labour (coolie system) ==
Chaturvedi became interested in the conditions of indentured labourers (Girmitiya) of Indian origin in Fiji, where he spent several years. He wrote extensively about Indians in Fiji. With the intervention of Reverend C. F. Andrews, the system of indentured labour in Fiji formally ended in 1920.

Chaturvedi helped bring attention to the experiences of Indians in Fiji through My Twenty-One Years in the Fiji Islands (Hindi: Fiji Mein Mere Ikkis Varsh), originally written in Hindi by Totaram Sanadhya, an Indian indentured labourer who spent 21 years in Fiji. After returning to India in 1914, Sanadhya collaborated with Chaturvedi to publish his experiences. Chaturvedi helped edit and disseminate the book, which described the hardships faced by indentured labourers, known as Girmitiya, in Fiji under British colonial rule. The book helped draw attention to the conditions of indentured labourers abroad and was part of wider efforts that preceded the abolition of the indenture system in 1920.

An English translation titled My Twenty-One Years in the Fiji Islands; and, The Story of the Haunted Line was published by the Fiji Museum in 1991. Chaturvedi's collaboration with Totaram Sanadhya helped make Sanadhya's account of indentured labour in Fiji available to a wider readership, providing a record of this aspect of colonial history.

== Friendship with C.F. Andrews ==
Although Chaturvedi and C.F. Andrews came from different backgrounds, they shared interests in truth, nonviolence, and human dignity. Their association represented a cross-cultural partnership before such partnerships became common in post-colonial discourse.

Shortly after Fiji Mein Mere Ikkis Varsh was published in 1917, Andrews wrote the English introduction to the book's translated version, framing it for international audiences and policymakers. Chaturvedi met Andrews in Prayagraj in 1915, soon after Andrews returned from his fact-finding mission to Fiji concerning indentured Indian labourers.

Andrews praised Sanadhya's courage and Chaturvedi's editorial efforts. He also lobbied the British government using the book as evidence in his campaigns. The work of Andrews and Chaturvedi helped build public pressure on the British Indian government. In March 1917, after sustained campaigns, the Indian indenture system was officially abolished. The ban on new unfair labour agreements came first, and by 1920, the system was entirely dismantled.

Their collaboration contributed to this historical outcome. Both men remained engaged with marginalised communities long after the system ended. They often exchanged letters and met in Delhi, Calcutta, and Santiniketan, where Andrews was closely involved with Tagore's Visva-Bharati. The collaboration between Chaturvedi and Andrews has been described as an example of how writing, advocacy, and journalism contributed to campaigns against oppressive systems. Their friendship has been cited as an example of intercultural solidarity during India's movement toward independence.

Andrews died in Calcutta in 1940 and was widely known in India as "Deenbandhu" (Friend of the Poor).

== Preservation of regional dialects (Janpad Andolan) ==
The term "Janpad Andolan" (जनपद आंदोलन) refers to a cultural and literary movement aimed at recognising and promoting regional languages and folk traditions within India. Chaturvedi contributed to this movement. The Janpad Andolan gained momentum through the efforts of scholars such as Professor Rajendra Chaturvedi, who is known for his work in promoting regional languages and folk traditions. He has acknowledged the influence of Chaturvedi in shaping his perspectives.

Initial research on regional dialects of Hindi was conducted at the Institute of Oriental Studies at Moscow University.

Chaturvedi worked with Rahul Sankrityayan and Bahadur Shah Agrawal to support the Janpad movement. He promoted literature in local dialects and the preservation of regional vocabulary by creating regional language dictionaries. He patronised writers and poets in the Awadhi language, including Ramai Kaka and Banshidhar Shukla; Bhojpuri writer Uday Narayan Tiwari; Garhwali writers; Maithili writer Ram Iqbal Singh Rakesh; and many writers in Bundeli, Magahi, and Braj Bhasha.

== Collaboration with Hindi writers and journalists ==
Chaturvedi's legacy included his essays and journalistic work, as well as his associations with writers and thinkers with whom he collaborated and debated. His friendships with Mahadevi Verma, Harivansh Rai Bachchan, Ramdhari Singh Dinkar, Hazari Prasad Dwivedi, Jainendra Kumar, Rahul Sankrityayan, Atal Bihari Vajpayee, and others reflected his view of Hindi literature as both a cultural expression and a national project.

Chaturvedi interacted with Munshi Premchand during literary conferences in the 1920s and 1930s, especially the Hindi Sahitya Sammelan in Kashi (Varanasi) in 1922. Both writers focused on realism, social critique, and rural India. Chaturvedi praised Premchand's courage in writing Godaan (1936), while Premchand respected Chaturvedi's journalism. Their works were often discussed in journals such as Madhuri and Vishal Bharat, which Chaturvedi helped edit.

Chaturvedi and Mahadevi Verma met at the Prayag Mahila Vidyapeeth in the 1930s and again during literary meets in Allahabad, where both lived and worked. Both were involved with Chand and Vishal Bharat magazines and supported women's education and rural reform. Chaturvedi reviewed her essays and helped promote her prose writings at a time when she was primarily known for poetry.

He frequently visited Santiniketan between 1930 and 1940, often at the invitation of Andrews and Tagore. He gave lectures on Hindi journalism and the Indian diaspora and interacted with Tagore's circle, including Kshitimohan Sen and Leonard Elmhirst. These visits contributed to Chaturvedi's role as a link between Hindi writers and the Bengali Renaissance movement.

Chaturvedi considered Ganesh Shankar Vidyarthi his role model. Both were journalists committed to truth and justice. In late 1921, Chaturvedi visited Kanpur, where he and Vidyarthi held several long conversations about editorial ethics, the responsibility of a nationalist press, and the role of vernacular journalism in shaping public opinion. He worked briefly with Pratap, Vidyarthi's newspaper in Kanpur, around 1921–22, contributing columns on caste oppression and colonial injustices. During the 1921–1922 period, Chaturvedi contributed a series of essays and reports to Pratap, focusing on the condition of rural peasants under zamindari oppression, the plight of Indian labourers in Burma and Fiji, and the cultural neglect of Hindi-speaking communities by colonial authorities.

These essays complemented Vidyarthi's own editorials. Chaturvedi also helped organise local Hindi writers and poets in Kanpur and Prayagraj to write politically conscious pieces for the newspaper.

After Vidyarthi was killed in 1931 during communal violence in Kanpur, Chaturvedi wrote a tribute titled "Ek Satyagrahi Patrakar Ki Mrityu". Vidyarthi's death influenced Chaturvedi's writing in the 1930s and 1940s, especially on communal harmony and nonviolent activism.

He also forged close associations with Rahul Sankrityayan, Hazari Prasad Dwivedi, Ramdhari Singh Dinkar, Harivansh Rai Bachchan, Jainendra Kumar, and Kamta Prasad Guru. He was both a participant and a facilitator in literary and social movements, connecting writers, movements, and ideologies through his belief that literature should serve truth, justice, and human dignity.

Chaturvedi regularly met his literary associates at Hindi Sahitya Sammelans, held in Kashi, Allahabad, and Delhi, and at All India Hindi Writers' Conferences from the 1930s to the 1960s.

== Rajya Sabha Member of Parliament (1952–64) ==
Chaturvedi served as a nominated member of the Rajya Sabha, the upper house of India's Parliament, from 1952 to 1964. As a Hindi writer and journalist, he used this position to support Hindi literature and education. He also supported efforts to advance Hindi as a national language and to promote literary initiatives across India.

As an MP, he worked for the welfare of freedom fighters and their families. He organised "Shaheedon ke Shradh" to pay homage to figures such as Chandra Shekhar Azad, Ram Prasad Bismil, Sachindranath Sanyal, Ashfaqulla Khan, and Jatindra Nath Das. He helped arrange pensions for their families and worked on issues concerning their well-being.

Chaturvedi was associated with the founding and construction of Hindi Bhavana at Rabindranath Tagore's Visva Bharati in Santiniketan in 1939.

== Notable works ==
Among his notable works are the following:

- Charles Freer Andrews, a Narrative an English-language book written by Chaturvedi with Marjorie Sykes as co-author and a foreword by Mahatma Gandhi, published in 1949.
- Fiji Mein Mere Ikkis Varsh, a co-authored and edited memoir of Totaram Sanadhya describing the experiences of Indian indentured labourers in Fiji. The book contributed to discussions surrounding the abolition of the indenture system and was translated into English as My Twenty-One Years in the Fiji Islands.
- Rekhachitra (1952), a collection of character sketches of literary and political figures.
- Sahitya aur Jeevan (1954), a collection of essays on the relationship between literature and life.
- Bharatbhakt Andrews, a biography of C.F. Andrews, the British missionary who supported the Indian independence movement and the rights of indentured Indians.
- Satyanarayan Kaviratna, a biographical and critical work on the life and writings of a literary figure.
- Sansmaran, a memoir containing personal recollections and anecdotes about the cultural and intellectual milieu of early 20th-century India.
- Vishal Bharat, a monthly magazine edited by Chaturvedi that published works by Hindi writers and intellectuals and covered national and international issues.
- Setubandh (1962), a collection of stories about foreign social workers in India.
