= Jogesh Chandra Bagal =

Indian journalist, historian and writer

- Born: 27 May 1903; Chalisa, Backergunge district, Bengal, British India
- Died: 7 January 1972 (aged 68); Barrackpore, Calcutta, West Bengal, India
- Occupations: Journalist, historian

Jogesh Chandra Bagal (1903–1972) was an Indian journalist, historian and writer.

== Early life ==
Bagal was born Jagadbandhu and Tarangini Devi at Chalisa village in Barisal district on 27 May 1903. After completing his secondary education he took admission to City College and finally graduated from the University of Calcutta.

== Career ==
At the age of 26, he joined Prabasi and Modern Review as a journalist. His colleagues were Brajendranath Bandyopadhyay, Sajanikanta Das and Nirad Chandra Chaudhuri. In 1935, he became a columnist in Desh on international affairs. In 1940, at the age of 37, Bagal completed his first research work Bharater Muktisandhani. In 1960, he founded Sahityika, a literary organization in New Barrackpore-Madhyamgram area. The organization is still existent and is headed by Purnendu Basu. By 1961, he completely lost his sight. He continued his studies and research and completed five research works through dictation.

He died on 7 January 1972 in Kolkata.

== Books ==
- 1953. History of the Indian Association. Indian Association. Library of Congress: DS401.I3553 B33.
- 1953. Peasant Revolution in Bengal. Bhrati Library. OCLC Number: 17606172.
- History of the Government College of Arts and Crafts.
- 1972. Muktir Sandhane Bharat. University of Michigan. Library of Congress: DS485.B48 B27.
- 1963. Unavimsha Shataker Bangla. Rañjana Pābliśiṃ Hāusa. Library of Congress: DS486.B46 B3.
- Kalkatar Samskriti Kendra.
- 1968. Hindu Melar Itibritta. Maitri. OCLC Number: 417390882.
- 1971. Banga Samskritir Katha. Basudhārā Prakāśanī. Library of Congress: HS81.I5 B3.
- 1976. Dirojio. Kalikātā: Jijñāsā. Library of Congress: LA2383.I62 D453.

== Awards ==
- Rampran Guha Puraskar by Bangiya Sahitya Parishad
- Shishir Kumar Ghosh Smriti Puraskar by Bangiya Sahitya Parishad
- Sarojini Basu Gold Medal by University of Calcutta, 1962

== Legacy ==
In 2003, the municipality named a road after him and erected a bronze statue of him.
