= Mukunda Das =

Bengali composer and poet (1878–1934)

- মুকুন্দদাস
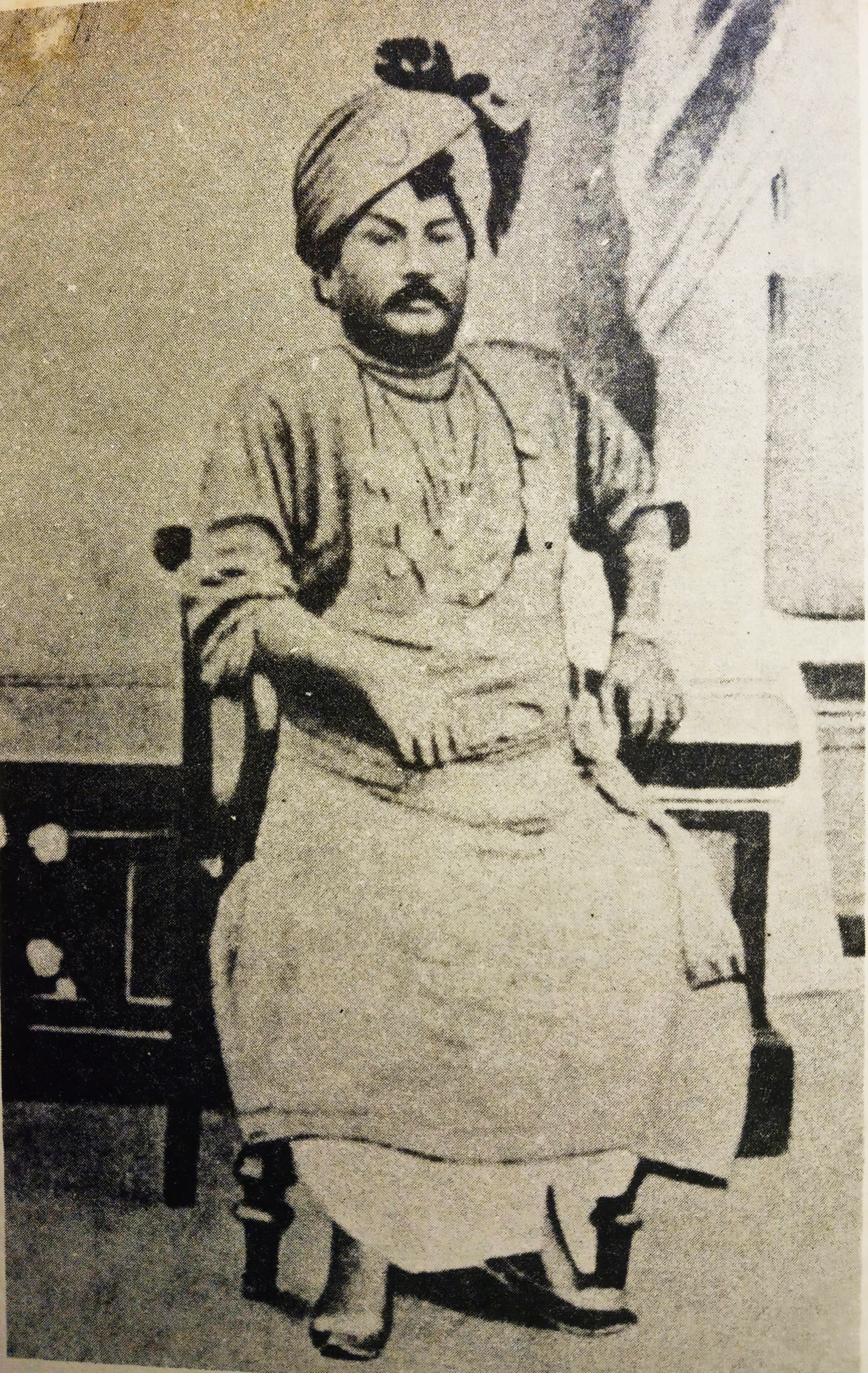
- Born: Yajneshwar De; 22 February 1878; Dhaka, Bengal, British India
- Died: 18 May 1934 (aged 56); Kolkata, Bengal, British India
- Occupations: Playwright, lyricist
- Spouse: Shatadalbasini Devi
- Children: 1

Mukunda Das (Bengali: মুকুন্দদাস; 22 February 1878 – 18 May 1934) was a Bengali poet, ballad singer, composer and patriot, who contributed to the spread of Swadeshi movement in rural Bengal. He was commonly referred to as "Charankabi" (The Writer of Ballads) during his time. His composed "Zatra" plays like "Matripuja" (Worship of Mothers) gained much popularity among the rural folk especially during the British Raj.

== Early life ==
Mukunda Das came from a modest background. His grandfather was a boatman and his father was a grocer. He was born as Yajneshwar De to Gurudayal De and Shyamasundari Devi on 22 February 1878, in the village of Banari, in the Bikrampur pargana of Dhaka District (currently part of Munshiganj District, Bangladesh). When he was seven, the family migrated to Barisal where they settled permanently. His father set up a grocery store in the Alekanda region of Barisal town. Being Vaishnavas, his father used to sing devotional songs while running the store. The Deputy Magistrate of Barisal, pleased with his melodious voice offered him the job of an orderly in the Barisal court. Yajneshwar's father took up the job and he began to run the store.

Yajneshwar too was gifted with a melodious voice. He, from his very childhood, began to compose and sing songs on his own. He attended the Barisal Zilla School, but he did not like studies and was irregular at school. He spent most of his time fishing, capturing bird's nests and playing with neighbourhood boys. In 1893, he was admitted to the Brojomohun School. He attended the Brojomohun School for six years, but dropped out after the eighth standard. Ashwini Kumar Dutta, upset at the failure of a pupil of his own institution, decided to speak to Yajneshwar himself. Datta had heard his melodious voice before and had realized the potential and talent in him. He called Yajneshwar to his house and initiated him into the patriotic movement.

== Career ==
In 1897, after dropping out from school, Yajneshwar joined the group of Bireshwar Dutta, the kirtan singer of Barisal at that time. After the death of Bireshwar Dutta, he formed a kirtan group of his own. In 1900, he took initiation in Vaishavism from a monk Rasananda Thakur, sometimes also known as Haribolananda. His guru gave him the name Mukunda Das.

In 1905, Ashwini Kumar Dutta gave an inspiring speech at the Barisal Town Hall, against the proposed Partition of Bengal. Stressing on the need to spread the message far and wide, he wished that message from the leaders could be carried to the villages through dramas and plays. Mukunda Das was deeply moved by Ashwini Kumar Dutta's speech. He resolved to fulfil the wish of the great patriot. Within three months he composed his masterpiece 'Matripuja'. The primary theme of his drama was patriotism and freedom movement. The goal of the freedom movement was to free Bharat Mata from the yoke of British imperialism. The children of Bharat Mata would lay down their lives to attain freedom. He raised a Swadeshi theatre group to stage plays across the villages of Bengal. In 1906, Mukunda Das staged his plays at different places of Barisal and then travelled to Noakhali and Tripura and returned to Barisal before the monsoons. In June 1906, he staged his drama at the Swadeshi Utsav in Barisal, where his play was highly praised by the national leadership. In October, he travelled with his group to Madaripur in Faridpur district, and from there to many places finally returning to Barisal in April 1907. On 16 April, he staged the play in the palace of the Rai Bahadur.

After a run of two years, 'Matripuja' was successful in arousing the patriotic feelings of the masses of Bengal. The play was further popularized by the press. Bande Mataram, Yugantar, Sandhya, Nabashakti, Prabasi and Modern Review, each of them played a part in popularizing the drama. The government of newly formed Eastern Bengal and Assam clamped down, citing incitement to violence. In 1908, he staged the drama in few places in Khulna district, then in truncated Bengal, but he was stopped by the police when he tried to stage the play in Bagerhat. In October 1908, the drama stepped in to the fourth season. In 1908, he was arrested and imprisoned for three years on charges of sedition.

In 1921, Mohandas Gandhi gave the call of Non-Cooperation Movement. Mukunda Das joined the movement with his proven repertoire of drama. Around 1923 the movement was called off and Mukunda Das settled with his group in Kolkata. 'Matripuja' was banned by the government at that time. He began to compose social plays in order to avoid being banned. In 1932, the government banned all his plays.

== Later life ==
After the ban, he was restricted to singing only. He along with his group performed only musical shows. His health deteriorated. On 17 May 1934, he returned late from a performance and died in his sleep.

== Works ==
Mukunda Das composed five dramas - Palliseva, Brahmacharini, Samaj o Path.

== In popular culture ==
Charan Kavi Mukundadas is a 1954 Indian Bengali-language biographical film about the poet, directed by Nirmal Choudhury.

== See also ==
- Ashwini Kumar Dutta
