= Taranath Tantrik =

Fictional character by Bibhutibhushan Bandyopadhyay

- First appearance: Tarnath Tantrik-er Golpo by Bibhutibhushan Bandyopadhyay
- Last appearance: Abar Taranath by Taradas Bandyopadhyay
- Created by: Bibhutibhushan Bandyopadhyay; Taradas Bandyopadhyay
- Portrayed by: Tota Roy Chowdhury; Koushik Roy; Jayanta Kripalni

In-universe information
- Full name: Taranath Chakraborty
- Occupation: Astrologer Practitioner of Occult Practices
- Family: Chari (Daughter)
- Religion: Hinduism
- Home: Mott Lane, Central Kolkata (Previously Vagabond Saint) (Ancestral Home at Rudrapur Village of Maliara region of Bankura
- Nationality: Indian

Taranath Tantrik is a fictional character of Bengali literature created by the legendary Bengali novelist Bibhutibhushan Bandyopadhyay. Later his son Taradas Bandyopadhyay wrote several more stories featuring the character. The elder son of Taradas Bandyopadhyay, Tathagata Bandyopadhyay is continuing the legacy of Taranath. Younger son Trinankur Bandyopadhyay also wrote a story on Taranath Tantrik, but it is likely that Tathagata Bandyopadhyay will be continuing the family legacy.

== Character ==
Taranath Tantrik is a mystic figure and practitioner of occult. He lives with his daughter Chari and his wife in a house of Mott lane in central Kolkata after having lost most of his supernatural powers because of misuse of Tantra. The person looked like a man in his mid fifties. He is an astrologer by profession and had many encounters with the supernatural forces in his extensive travels throughout the Bengal. He shares those experiences with two young friends Writer and Kishori in his Mott lane house over cups of tea, telebhaja-muri and cigarettes. It is stated that the writer is a regular visitor at Taranath's house, sometimes with his friend, sometimes alone.

== Stories ==
=== Bibhutibhushan Bandyopadhyay ===
In 1940, Bibhutibhushan Bandyopadhyay created the character Taranath but he wrote only two short stories featuring this character and much of Taranath's life is displayed prominently through these two stories:

1. Tarnath Tantrik-er Golpo
2. Madhusundari Debi'r Abirbhab

=== Taradas Bandyopadhyay ===
After Bibhutibhushan Bandyopadhyay, his son Taradas Bandyopadhyay continued writing stories featuring Taranath Tantrik. He wrote total six stories and novels. All the stories are supernatural and paranormal, based on dark arts, mystery and magic realism.

1. Taranath Tantrik (10 Stories)
2. Panchamundi'r Asan
3. Tinti Kaak-er Golpo
4. Brojobhushan-er Biswasprapti
5. Taranath Tantrik O Brahmapishach
6. Taranath Tantrik-er Aschorjyo Duniya
7. Alatchakra (Novel)
8. Abar Taranath

Tathagata Bandyopadhyay

After Taradas Bandyopadhyay, his son Tathagata Bandyopadhyay started writing stories featuring Taranath Tantrik. He has written three stories so far (June 2026), and a fourth is said to be coming soon. According to him, he started writing Taranath stories to stop fan fiction writers who are not doing justice to the character.

1. Bhondo Taranath
2. Taranather Bramhastra
3. Rudradeb Taranath
4. Dashachakre Taranath

Trinankur Bandyopadhyay

1. Kolkataye Taranath

But both of the new-gen stories have not been able to create stir among the general public. Critics believe that they are trying to make the simple character , who was closer to the soil, a very complex superhero.

== Adaptations ==
Stories of Taranath was broadcast in Sunday Suspense at Kolkata Radio Mirchi. Many stories of Taranath Tantrik were also aired later on Goppo mir er Thek a podcast directed by Mir Afsar Ali. Bengali filmmaker Q alias Qaushiq Mukherjee has made Hoichoi web series named Taranath Tantrik based on the stories of Taranath. Koushik Roy and Jayanta Kripalni played the title role. The character was reimagined as TNT for a series of graphic novels by Shamik Dasgupta. In the year 2016, actor Tota Roy Chowdhury played Taranath in Taranath Tantrik, a modern adaptation TV Series of Colors Bangla. Bhutoporbo, a horror anthology film released in 2025, has a Taranath Tantrik adaptation in one of its three stories. Saptarshi Moulik plays a young Taranath, and Rupanjana Mitra plays Matu Pagli.
