= Aranyak =

1976 novel by Bibhutibhushan Bandopadhyay

- Aranyak
- Author: Bibhutibhushan Bandopadhyay
- Language: Bengali
- Genre: Novel
- Publisher: Mitra & Ghosh Publishers Pvt. Ltd (Presently)
- Publication date: May 1976
- Publication place: India
- Media type: Print (Paperback)
- Pages: 168
- ISBN: 81-7293-120-4

Aranyak (Bengali: আরণ্যক [aɾonːok], literally "forest-grown, of the forest") composed between 1937 and 1939 and published in 1939, is a Bengali-language novel by Bibhutibhushan Bandopadhyay, based on his years in northern Bihar, mainly in the districts of Purnea and Bhagalpur. The novel explores the journey of its protagonist Satyacharan through the contrasting landscapes of the jungle and the city.

== Background ==
From 1924 to 1930, Bandopadhyay worked in the villages of Azamabad, Fulkia, Lobtulia and Baihar in the state of Bihar as an agent for the estate of Khilat Chandra Ghosh, overseeing land clearances by deforestation and administering to local tenants. His experience left him with a lasting impression of the beauty of the area and of the poverty of its people, including peasants, impoverished Brahmins, migrant laborers and adivasis, all of whom appear in the novel. On 12 February 1928 he wrote in his personal diary (Smritir Lekha): I shall write something about the lives around this jungle. A portrait of tough, courageous, short, neglected lives. This jungle, its loneliness, getting lost while riding a horse — darkness — to live in this jungle building temporary thatch settlements ... The poverty, simplicity of these people, this virile, active life, the picture of this dense forest in the pitch darkness of this evening — all of this. (Bibhutibhushan Rachanasamagra 1, page 417). In an unpublished diary entry he added, in 1934: A novel on forests. It will have the stories of loneliness, stories of trees and plants ... In this novel I shall bring out the divide between the wealthy landlords and the poor, sad peasants. They are homeless ... They don't get to eat.

Aranyak was published serially in a monthly magazine titled Prabasi. It was first published as a book by Katyayani Book Sellers; the current Bengali edition is published by Mitra & Ghosh Publishers. The novel was dedicated to Bandopadhyay's first wife Gauri Devi.

== Plot ==
After studying as a university student in Calcutta, Satyacharan accepts a job offer to manage a wealthy landowner's estate in Bhagalpur district in Bihar. Initially his urban lifestyle leaves him alienated and unprepared for an isolated existence in the jungle, but gradually he is hypnotized by the environment, including the simple lives of its inhabitants. He finds himself increasingly drawn to the peace of the forest while making return trips to the city.

Satyacharan and his partner Jugalprasad, a perfect match to the nature-loving soul of Satyacharan decorated the forest by planting many rare species of herbs and saplings. But Satyacharan is an estate manager and his job was to reclaim the forest land and distribute to the people for more revenue earnings. He has no other way but to destroy this wonderful creation of the forest-Goddess against his own will and distribute it amongst the local people. Age old gigantic trees as well as plants and herbs of rare species are being destroyed to make way for human encroachment. The novel ends with a deep feeling of guilt and sadness in Satyacharan.

== Characters ==
=== Satyacharan ===
The novel "Aranyak" is written in first person. The protagonist of the novel is Satyacharan — a young man who has had to travel out of Kolkata in search of a job. He is the sole bridge that connects the forest with the so-called civilized outer world. The unsaid comparison between the two worlds that is hidden almost everywhere in the novel, would have never been possible without the presence of this character. Satyacharan is one of the most important characters in this novel. However, it will be a grave mistake to think of him as the central character of this novel. He is an outsider- who has no connection with the forest or the forest people. He is a mere audience of the daily mystery drama that is played in the stage of the jungle every day. He can only witness the acting in this beautiful drama from outside, he does not have the capability to go up onto the stage and take part in that drama. Basically there is no central character in the novel "Aranyak". The forest itself is the central character — which introduces itself through the beauty of the forest and the lives of the forest people at every point. Satyacharan stands outside of all of this. Through his sharp intellect and intense feelings he can understand and enjoy whatever he watches, but he can not engross himself into any of it. Because he does not belong to the forest, he is an outsider.

=== Raju Pnaare ===
He is a poor, shy and religious man who spends the entire day in worship and had to lead his life eating only grains of Chinese grass. He got two bighas of land courtesy of Satyacharan but could not deforest it in two years time. Satyacharan gave him some more land but his habit did not change. Raju was more of a poetic and philosophical nature than that of a financial nature.

=== Aditya Narayan Dash ===
When a short boy named Dhaturia came to perform dance here his age was not more than twelve or thirteen. In the Southern parts there was a famine due to drought, hence the people of those lands went out to perform dances. Dhaturia came along with such a party — he was only paid with meals, that too only as meager as Chinese grass grains with salt, and at most some jungle vegetables.

=== Dhaotal Sahu ===
Dhaotal Sahu is a wealthy moneylender living in the village of Naogachia. Unlike most money lenders, he is not greedy. Everyone around the forest knows and transacts with him. He is a kind, simple and non-egtistic person, who does not mind wearing dusty clothes or having simple meals such as sattu.

=== Matuknath Pnaare ===
Matuknath Pnaare is a descendant of an educated Brahmin family, who used to teach in a tol or a small primary school in his village. Once the school closed down, he wandered in search of a job and landed in the office of Satyacharan one day. He thinks — if the manager favors him then there would be an opportunity of earning. There could be no arrangements made for him in the office as he knew nothing about the work, but he stayed there for a few days. Satyacharan also did not object in that, because may be he liked this simple, almost callous ever happy man somewhat.

=== Jugalprasad ===
Jugalprasad is one of the mystic characters of the novel. He is an ardent lover of Nature. He has a goal of beautifying the forest until his death. He had collected ornamental plants likes-Rangon, Baganbilash from Kolkata city to plant. Also collect water-lilies to beautify the forest.

=== Kunta ===
Kunta is a holly sati as drawn by the author. She was daughter of a Baiji. But later she was married by a Rajput. Soon after her marriage she lost her husband. She was then captured by Rasbihari Singh, who wanted to marry her. Kunta escaped from Rasbihari's hand and started life in great hardship. Later she was graced by Satya and got some land in free. At the end of the story, she was found crying as Satya left for ever.

=== Venkateshwar Prasad ===
Venkateswar was a local poet and lived with his wife at the vicinity of the forest. Once he invited Satya to listen his poems. Though Satya did not enjoy the poems, still he pressed Venkateswar for his hearty effort.

=== Manchi ===
Manchi is a young Gangota (aq tribe caste) girl, unfortunately married to an old Sardar, Naxedi. She has got a tremendous life in her which attracted Satya. She gossiped with Satya several times and started thinking that Bengali people (Satya) are very good writers. She asked Satya to write about Their fallacy of poverty and untouchability. She had great interest in cheap fancy commodities. One day she was found to be missing. Satya suspected that anyone tempted her by fancy things and took her to tea estate to employ her as a female-labour. Later Naxedi and his first wife along with their daughters (Suratia) got some land from Satya and escaped their vagabond life.

=== Raja Dobru Panna and Princess Bhanumati ===
Raja Doboru Panna is truly a raja (king) of a few Santals. He is an old man who lost all of his royal powers after independence. Still, his personality takes after a king. Satya pays him a visit, and Doboru invites him cordially. After a few months of this visit, the news of Doboru's death comes to Satya. Later on, Satya goes to Santal Pargana (residence of Doboru). Jagaru Panna is the son of Doboru, who has no such influence on the plot. But Bhanumati, granddaughter of Doboru, had a friendly relationship with Satya. At the fag end of the novel, when Satya is about to leave the forest forever, he goes to visit Bhanumati for the last time. We find much to our exclamation that on his return, Satya thinks, "If I could marry Bhanumati and build a happy nest for us.. Bhanu would speak out of some imaginative giant, and I would be her listener."

=== Rashbehari Singh ===
Rasbehari is one of the most cruel zamindars who ruled poor tribes by his weapon and manpower. He has no such clash with Satya though he joins to Chote Singh and Nandlal Ojha Golaoala to drive out the honest manager Satya by influencing higher authority. Even he invites Satya in a ceremony of Holy to show off his power. He once captured Kunta in order to marry her. He can be considered as the perfect villain of the novel.

=== Nandalal Ojha ===
Nandalal Ojha is one of the few bad men in the novel. He knows how to cajole people to his own advantage. Those who does not make him happy becomes his enemy. He is really a dangerous person.

== Publishing ==
Aranyak used to be published serially in a monthly magazine titled Prabasi. It was first published as a book by Katyayani Book Stall. Presently the edition available is the one published by Mitra & Ghosh Publishers Pvt. Ltd. It was first published in May, 1976 and the present paperback classic edition is the 24th print which is dated January, 2010. This edition was edited by Shri Taradas Bandyopadhyay, son of the author.

== Translations ==
Aranyak has been translated into Sinhala language by Chintha Lakshmi Sinhaarachchi (චින්තා ලක්‍ෂ්මී සිංහආරච්චි) as Aranakata Pem Banda (අරණකට පෙම් බැඳ). The novel has been translated into English by Rimli Bhattacharya as Aranyak: Of the Forest (2002). The book has been translated into English in January 2017 by Lucknow-based Suchismita Banerjee Rai. The English version is published by Kolkata-based Mitra and Ghosh Publishers. The book’s Hindi version was translated by Kallol Chakraborty and was published by Ananya Prakashan in 2022.The book has been translated into Malayalam as "Aaranyakam" by Leela Sarkar in 2008. This novel has been translated into French (De la forêt) by France Bhattacharya and published by Zulma in 2020.
