= Taranath Tantrik (TV series) =

Indian Bengali web series

- Release Poster
- Genre: Mystery
- Directed by: Qaushiq Mukherjee
- Country of origin: India
- Original language: Bengali
- No. of seasons: 1
- No. of episodes: 10

Production
- Production company: ODDJOINT

Original release
- Release: 18 January 2019

Taranath Tantrik is a Bengali horror web series streaming on Bengali OTT platform hoichoi. Bibhutibhushan wrote two short stories about the character of necromancer and Hindu esoteric occult practitioner Taranath Tantrik. It is directed by Qaushiq Mukherjee who also known as Q.

== Cast ==
- Jayant Kripalani
- Koushik Roy
- Satrajit Sarkar
- Joyraj Bhattacharya
- Sweta Chaudhuri
- Uma Banerjee
- Geetanjali Dang

== Episodes ==
Series	Episodes	Originally released
1	10	18 January 2019

== Season 1 (2019) ==
The series first started streaming on the OTT platform on 18 January 2019 with 10 episodes.

== Episodes ==
No.	Title	Directed by	Original release date
1	"Taranath Tantrik"	Qaushiq Mukherjee	18 January 2019
2	"Matu Pagli"	Qaushiq Mukherjee	18 January 2019
3	"Subala"	Qaushiq Mukherjee	18 January 2019
4	"Jawrashur"	Qaushiq Mukherjee	18 January 2019
5	"Betal"	Qaushiq Mukherjee	18 January 2019
6	"kalbhairav"	Qaushiq Mukherjee	18 January 2019
7	"Birjabala"	Qaushiq Mukherjee	18 January 2019
8	"Tarabhoirobi"	Qaushiq Mukherjee	18 January 2019
9	"Madhsundari Debi"	Qaushiq Mukherjee	18 January 2019
10	"Bathtob"	Qaushiq Mukherjee	18 January 2019
