= Sarasibala Basu =

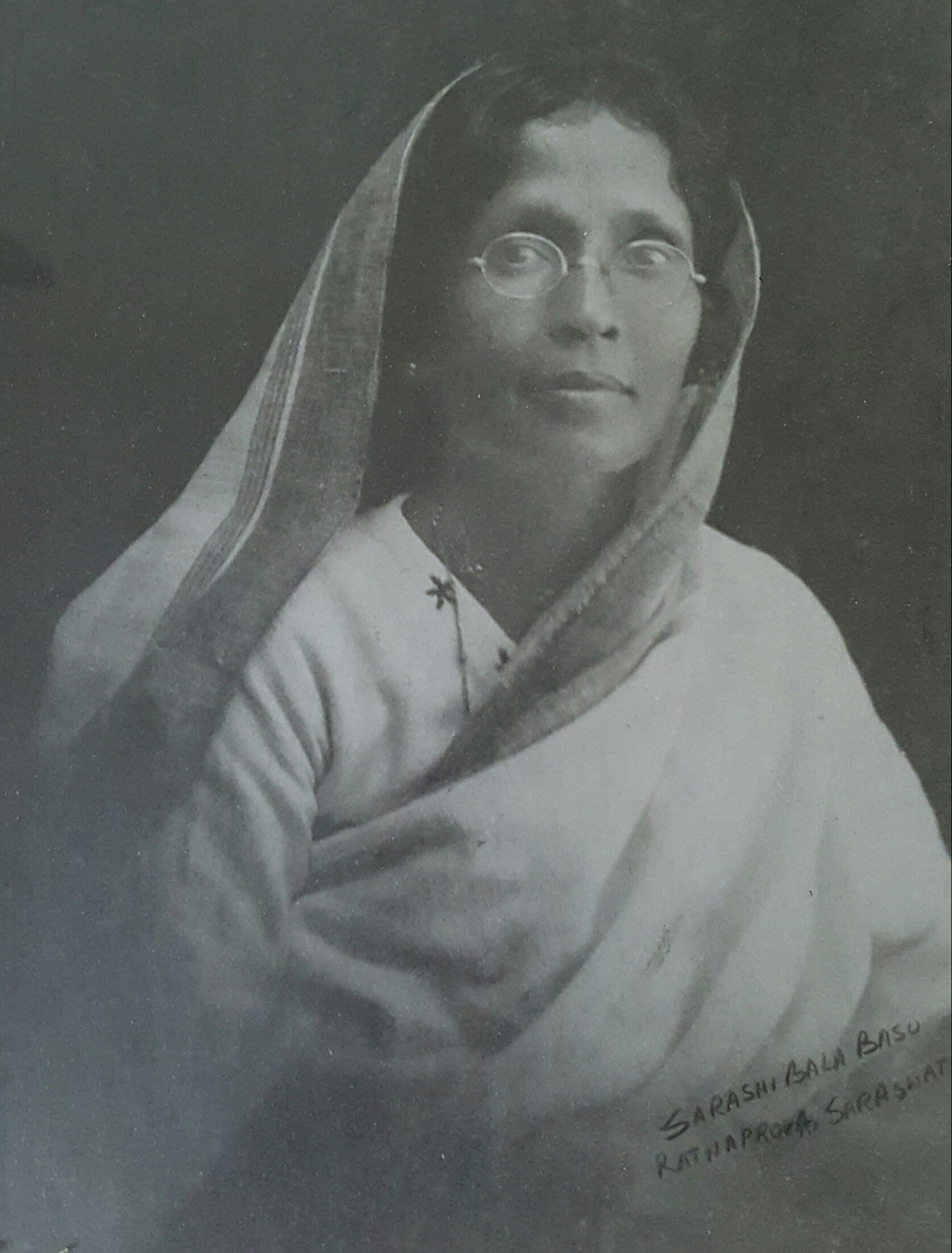
- Picture of Sarasibala Basu: novelist, story teller, poet, women's rights activist, social activist
- Born: 1886; Kolkata, India
- Died: 1929 (aged 42–43)
- Known for: Novelist, Story teller, Poet

Sarasibala Basu (1886–1929) was a novelist, story teller, poet from the Bengal region of the Indian subcontinent. She belonged to the generation of writers of the Bengali Renaissance. In her short lifespan, she had published more than twenty novels, many short stories and poems, and made a big impact on Bengali literature. An equal quantity of her writings had remained unpublished. Sarasibala wrote passionately about the social issues of that period and the world around her.

== Early life and education ==
Sarasibala Basu was born in Kolkata in 1886. Her childhood education began in a missionary school and thereafter she was admitted into another school, Mahakali Pathsala, in North Kolkata. After just one year, she was taken out of the school because of the Hindu prejudice of the time against women's education. At home she learned many things by listening to her brother's reading aloud his lessons. After her early marriage around the year 1900, she came to Giridih in Jharkhand. Her liberal minded husband, Phanindranath Basu, engaged a private tutor for her education at home. She also learned English and art from him.

== Career ==
With continuous encouragement from her husband, she began to nurture her love of Bengali literature and social work. Her writings, novels and poems, were published in the prestigious periodicals of the day, including, Bharatbarsha, Prabasi, Manashi, and Marmabani. Though she never belonged to the Brahmo Samaj, a social reform movement pioneered by the great Raja Rammohan Roy, its influences are apparent in her writings. She was free from the many prejudices and blind notions of the stagnant Hindu society of her time. Social service and brotherhood of mankind were her most cherished ideals. She became a didi, an elder sister, to many rising stars of Bengali literature, including, Probodh Sanyal, Ashapurna Devi, Narendra Deb, and Nirmal Baral.

She found time to write in the early hours of the morning when others in the house would be sleeping.

In her later life, Sarasibala responded to Mahatma Gandhi's call and worked for reform in the Hindu religion, particularly the rejection of the caste system and a society free of caste prejudice. She lectured widely on the promotion of women's education and other social welfare activities.

== Personal life ==
Sarasibala had a difficult family life; with her husband's modest income, she managed to raise her nine children, maintain a kitchen garden, a mangrove, a few cattle and do all the housework, and as much social service to the needy as she could squeeze in. All her activities took a toll on her health and she fell a victim to cancer, and died in 1929.
