= Hire Manik Jale =

1946 novella by Bibhutibhushan Bandopadhyay

- Cover page of the book
- Author: Bibhutibhushan Bandopadhyay
- Language: Bengali
- Genre: Adventure novel
- Publisher: Sishu Sahitya Sansad
- Publication date: 1946
- Publication place: India
- Media type: Print (hardback & paperback)
- Pages: 97 pp (2013 edition)
- ISBN: 978-81-7955-191-2

Hire Manik Jale (transl. The Hunt for Glittering Treasures) is a Bengali adventure novella written by Bibhutibhushan Bandopadhyay published in 1946.

== Synopsis ==
Sushil, a brave Bengali boy meets Jamatullah and goes to an adventure to an island of Dutch East Indies with Sanat and Jamatullah, where they find a cave and many diamonds and other precious stones. But unfortunately dangers await for them there.

The impact of "Hire Manik Jale" on Bengali literature is significant. While the novel centers around a thrilling treasure hunt, it also delves into deeper themes such as human nature, greed, and camaraderie.

The island, with its hidden treasures and lurking dangers, serves as a metaphor for the human quest for wealth and glory, as well as the unforeseen consequences that such a quest can bring about.

At last Sanat dies and Sushil divides the treasure money between everyone even with Sanat's mother.

Moreover, the interaction between the main characters offers a reflection on trust, betrayal, and the bonds that tie individuals together in challenging circumstances.

== Characters ==
- Sushil
- Jamatullah
- Sanat
- Yaar Hossein
