= Debjan =

Novel by Bibhutibhushan Bandyopadhyay

- Book cover
- Author: Bibhutibhushan Bandyopadhyay
- Language: Bengali
- Genre: Novel
- Publication place: India

Debjan is a Bengali novel written by Bibhutibhushan Bandyopadhyay. The work is a fiction and deals with life after death. The name Debjan is derived from the Sanskrit word "Devyaan" which literally translated as the path of Gods. This is the path of no return, i.e. a soul traversing this path will be liberated according to the ancient Indian scriptures. The description of this path occurs in Upanishads and also in Gita. The other path is known as Pitr Yaan. A soul traversing this path will have to return to the world again for reaping the fruits of Karma. Gita refers to these two paths as the "White" and the "Black" paths, one which leads to eternal life and the other compels one to return to the world. The exact sloka, however does not take the name "Devyaan".

== Synopsis ==
Jatin, the male protagonist of the novel, a Brahmin lives in a village. Though he is highly educated yet he is unemployed and poor. His wife Ashalata has deserted him and lives in her maternal house with their children. Jatin has met neither his wife nor his children for years. After suffering from high fever Jatin dies. Right after his death Jatin discovers Pushpa, his very intimate childhood friend who died 13 years ago is standing beside his bed. Pushpa tells Jatin that she has come to take him with her. And from here the main story begins. Jatin learns death is not the end of everything, but, it is just a beginning of a new life. Jatin meets many characters who shape his knowledge and wisdom on death, human relationship and its existence beyond human life, life after death, God, Atman, reincarnations, divine manifestations or avatars and Karma. There is a certain goddess who in the novel is referred to as Karuna Devi or goddess of compassion, who, out of the desire for the welfare and well being of ordinary mortals, comes to the earth to help people. He also meets a sannyasin or ascetic monk who attained the nirvikalpa samadhi and hence is a liberated soul. He meets the great Vaishnava saint Raghunath Das who worships the living image of his personal God. He meets Valmiki, the ancient poet who composed Ramayana. Jatin stays in the third sphere along with Pushpa. In this sphere it is possible to create environment out of imagination and Pushpa creates the same scenery as was present in her native place consisting of the river Ganga and its bank where she and Jatin used to play as children. There are still higher spheres where people have great powers by which they can create any object by a mere thought. There is no language of communication and people can communicate using thought waves as medium. There are also nether regions which are inhabited by souls of inferior nature. The higher regions are occupied by the celestial beings. God or the Supreme Being is beyond all regions and spheres. Every sphere is governed by a very powerful being who is a very advanced soul. Most of the souls of the higher realms are believer in God and they spend their time meditating upon the Supreme Being. Jatin also met advanced souls who are world travelers but are agnostic. It is made clear that in the universe there are an infinite number of spheres where people may be born and the purpose of life is to evolve spiritually by learning vital lessons from the life's experiences and thereby gaining wisdom. When all ignorance is dispelled people are liberated from the earthly existence and they go to the higher spheres or realms from where they progress even further. It is possible for the earthlings to degenerate and go to nether lands or to inferior regions in the after life if that helps them in gaining knowledge and wisdom in the hard way.

Jatin and Pushpa along with Karuna Devi and a few other advanced souls try to help several mortals, including Jatin's wife Ashalata who had gone astray. Jatin could not relinquish his infatuation for Ashalata which landed him in trouble as he had to born again in a poor rural household in Bengal. However, Pushpa intervened to free him from the misery of a mortal life. Pushpa was in love with Jatin but she was an advanced soul. In the book Jatin visits many spheres courtesy the different souls of higher realms who help him in his quest of knowledge, but he is unable to get rid of his infatuation and therefore has to be born again. In the end, even though Ashalata's karma was not in favour, she was given a new lease of life because of Jatin's love for her and she and Jatin were born again, destined to be united again in new bodies. Pushpa had to go back to the realms of immortality, leaving the hope for being ever united with Jatin. She made the sacrifice for Jatin's sake.

The book ends with a description of what the Supreme Being is and what is His relationship with the world, in accordance with the different scriptures in Hinduism. The book also touches upon long standing debates in Hindu theology like that between Advaita Vedanta which believes that one Supreme Impersonal Godhead Brahman permeates the entire Universe and the creation is the superimposition of this impersonal through Maya, and Vaishnavism, which is a dualist doctrine, i.e. it believes in God separate from the creation, viz. world. The book also emphasizes on love as a potent medium of progress and spiritual development and the transcendental love for God or bhakti as the highest means of emancipation.

The book depicts the concept of life after death as it appears in Hindu scriptures, esp. the Upanishads. The concepts of different Lokas or hierarchical regions beyond the material sphere is influenced by a similar depiction in Brihadaranyaka Upanishad.

== Characters ==
- Jatin
- Pushpa
- Ashalata (wife of Jatin)
- Pranay Devi
- Karuna Devi
- The universe wanderer
- Vaishnava monk
- Vedantin Sannyasin
