= Prabasi =

Bengali literary magazine

Probasi প্রবাসী
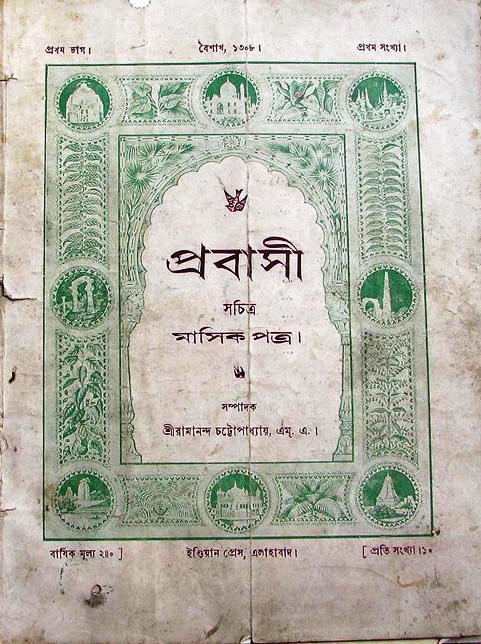
- Prabasi magazines, 1st number, 1308 BS
- Editor: Ramananda Chatterjee; Ashutosh Chakroborty (কার্য্যাধ্যহ্ম)
- Frequency: Monthly
- Publisher: Indian press
- Founded: 1901
- Country: British India
- Based in: Allahabad; Kolkata
- Language: Bengali

Prabasi (Bengali: প্রবাসী) was a monthly Bengali language literary magazine edited by Ramananda Chatterjee.

== History and profile ==
Prabasi was founded by Ramananda Chatterjee in 1901 and it ran for over 60 years. The magazine published many important Bengali authors, the most significant being Nobel laureate Rabindranath Tagore who published regularly in it from 1914 until his death. "It is no exaggeration to say that [Tagore's] major creations reached Bengali homes through [Prabasi]." There were over 350 contributors during its existence, including most of the major poet and prose writers of the day. The National Encyclopedia of Bangladesh said "Prabasi's fame remains almost unsurpassed by any other Bengali periodical". From 1901 to 1905 it was published in Allahabad. Then it was headquartered in Kolkata.

When Prabasi first appeared, it pioneered a mix of book excerpts, poetry, and one-act plays, alongside reviews and essays. It also included serialized fiction, including Rabindranath Tagore's Gora (1907-1909). It also included articles on history, art, archaeology, sociology, education, literature and literary theories, scientific topics, and travelogues. The magazine was known for its art and illustrations. It was the first ever periodical in Bengali to feature a reproduction of a photograph on its cover purely for the sake of illustration. Prabasi gave women the equal opportunity prove themselves as writers.

"Prabasi" literally means a "Bengali living outside Bengal", which can be translated as "Exile". Chatterjee wrote in 1903, "In truth, we are Indians first and Bengalis next".

The sister magazine of Prabasi was Modern Review. Unsatisfied with the limited reach of Prabasi, Ramananda Chatterjee launched Modern Review in 1907, targeted to English-speaking Indians. Modern Review was a great success and was read nationwide.

== Authors and works ==
Some of the authors and works featured in the magazine include:

- Premendra Mitra
- Rabindranath Tagore
- Nirad C. Chaudhuri
- Rakhaldas Bandyopadhyay
- Dwijendranath Tagore
- Gopal Chandra Bhattacharya
- Aranyak by Bibhutibhushan Bandopadhyay
- Sarasibala Basu
- Mukunda Das
- Jogesh Chandra Bagal
