= Vishal Bharat (magazine) =

Vishal Bharat (lit. 'Greater India') was an Indian Hindi-language magazine founded by Ramananda Chatterjee in 1929, initially edited by the prominent journalist Banarsidas Chaturvedi. It was nationalist and pro-Gandhi, covering the whole of India and its diaspora, with a particular emphasis on rural matters (particularly through its column 'Hamaare Gram' ['our villages']).
