= Adarsha Hindu Hotel =

1940 novel by Bibhutibhushan Bandyopadhyay

- Third edition title page
- Author: Bibhutibhushan Bandyopadhyay
- Original title: আদর্শ হিন্দু হোটেল
- Language: Bengali
- Genre: Novel
- Set in: Bengal
- Published: 1940
- Publication place: India

Adarsha Hindu Hotel (Ideal Hindu Hotel) is a Bengali novel written by Bibhutibhushan Bandyopadhyay. The novel was first published in 1940.

== Plot ==
Hajari Thakur, a middle-aged Bengali Brahmin is the male protagonist of the novel. He works as a cook in a hotel owned by Bechu Chakraborty near Ranaghat railway station. Here customers are often cheated and Padma, a maid at the establishment, steals the hotel's food. Hajari is strictly against these, but being just a cook, he does not have right to say anything. Here he is regularly mocked and insulted by Padma, who, though only a maid, is the owner's paramour and has immense influence over him. Hajari dreams to start his own hotel, but for that he needs Rs.200. Kusum is a young widow, whom Hajari considers as his daughter. One day utensils of Hajari's shop are stolen and police arrests Hajari. Following this incident, he loses his job.

After getting a loan from Kusum and Atashi, a girl from his village, Hajari starts his own hotel. Here he works hard with dedication and sincerity. In just a year his hotel becomes the most popular hotel of the area. Two other hotels of the area: one of Bechu Chakraborty and another of Jadu Banerjee almost get shut down. Hajari also gets a railway tender to manage a government-run hotel in the railway platform. At the end of the novel, Hazari signs a contract to manage a large railway hotels which are owned by a gujrati company and goes to Bombay. Before leaving, he appoints Bechu Chakraborty (whose own hotel was sealed recently) as a manager of the market area hotel. He also gives Padma a job, who used to insult him every now and then.

== Adaptations ==
- In 1957 a Bengali film Adarsha Hindu Hotel was made based on this novel. The film was directed by Ardhendu Sen.
- In 1989, a 13 episodes television serial was also made by director Raja Sen based on the novel. Actor Manoj Mitra played the role of Hajari thakur.
- A film is to be released in 2024 based on this novel. It will be directed by Arindam Sil and the role of Hajari thakur will be played by Mosharraf Karim.
