= Chintha Lakshmi Sinhaarachchi =

Sri Lankan writer

- Born: Sri Lanka
- Occupation: Writer, translator

Chintha Lakshmi Sinhaarachchi (Sinhala: චින්තා ලක්‍ෂ්මී සිංහආරච්චි) was a Sri Lankan writer who is best known for her translation of Bengali novels to Sinhalese.

== Works ==
=== Translations ===
- Mawathe Geethaya (Sinhala මාව‍තේ ගීතය) Sinhala translation of Pather Panchali ISBN 9789556520279
- Aparajitha Jeewithayak (Sinhala අපරාජිත ජීවිතයක්) Sinhala translation of first half of Aparajito ISBN 955-96040-0-7
- Apuge Lokaya (Sinhala අපූගේ ලෝකය) Sinhala translation of second half of Aparajito ISBN 955-96040-8-2
- Binduge Daruwa (Sinhala බිංදුගේ දරුවා) ISBN 955-1387-12-0
- Isiwaraya (Sinhala ඉසිවරයා)
- Shri Kaantha (Sinhala ශ්‍රී කාන්ත) Sinhala translation of first part of Srikanta ISBN 955-95147-8-4
- Shri Kantha Ha Raja Lakshmi (Sinhala ශ්‍රී කාන්ත හා රාජලක්‍ෂ්මී) ISBN 955-652-002-3 Sinhala translation of second part of Srikanta
- Aranakata Pem Banda (Sinhala අරණකට පෙම් බැඳ) Sinhala translation of Aranyak
- Gora (Sinhala ගෝරා) ISBN 955-652-042-2
- Go Danaya (Sinhala ගෝදානය) Sinhala translation of Godaan ISBN 9789556520422

=== Other works ===
- Rabindranaatha Takur Saha Bauddha Sanskruthiya (Sinhala රබීන්ද්‍රනාථ ඨාකූර් සහ බෞද්ධ සංස්කෘතිය)
