= Garbage (film) =

2018 Hindi-language film

- Directed by: Q
- Written by: Q
- Produced by: Shailesh R Singh; Hansal Mehta; Q Hina Saiyada; Dipankar Chaki
- Starring: Shruthi Viswan; Trimala Adhikari; Tanmay Dhanania; Satarupa Das; Satchit Puranik
- Cinematography: Q Lakshman Anand
- Edited by: Hina Saiyada
- Music by: Neel Adhikari
- Production companies: Karma Media and Entertainment; Oddjoint
- Release date: 17 February 2018 (Berlin)
- Running time: 109 minutes
- Country: India
- Language: Hindi

Garbage is a 2018 drama film written and directed by director Qaushiq Mukherjee (Q). Jointly produced by Mukherjee, Shailesh R Singh, Hansal Mehta, Hina Saiyada and Dipankar Chaki, the film stars Trimala Adhikari, Tanmay Dhanania, Shruti Viswan, Satarupa Das and Satchit Puranik in the lead roles. It was premiered in the panorama section at the 68th Berlin International Film Festival. The story follows Phanishwar, a taxi driver in Goa who has held a woman captive in his home. He encounters Rami, a victim of revenge porn and their worlds collide. Garbage became available on Netflix during 2018.

== Cast ==
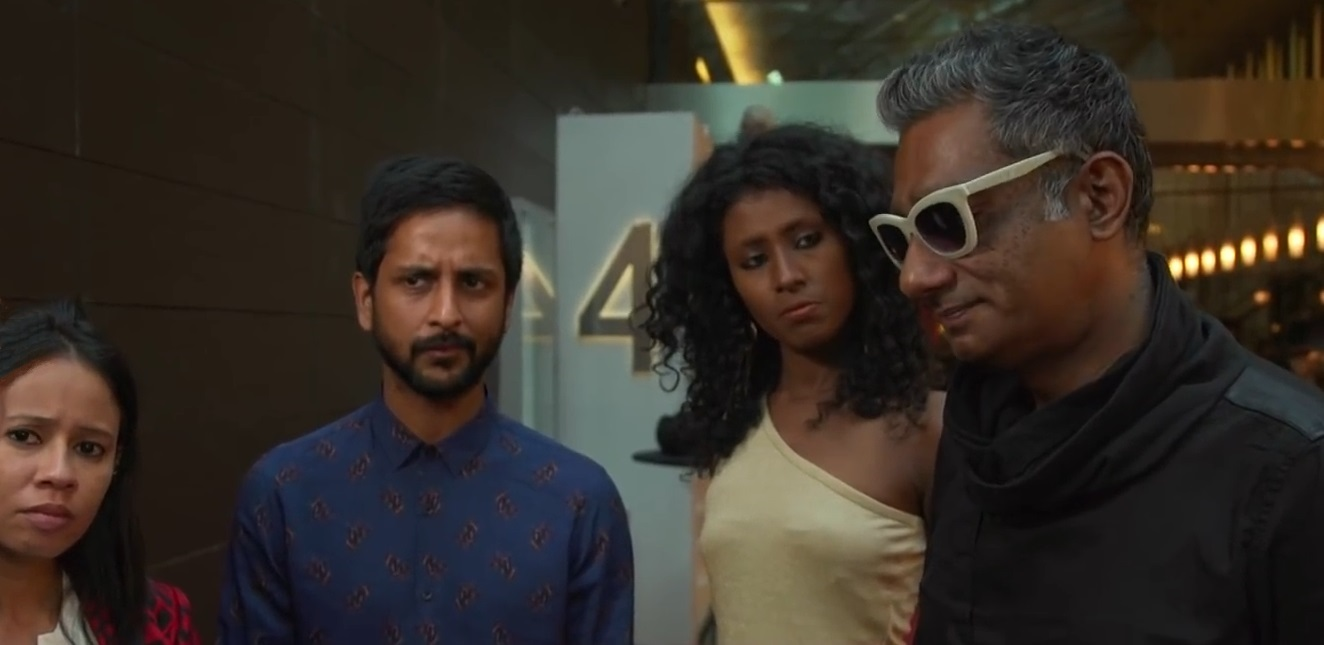
Q and cast of film 'Garbage' 2018

- Trimala Adhikari as Rami Kumar
- Tanmay Dhanania as Phanishwar
- Satarupa Das as Nanaam
- Satchit Puranik as Baba Satchitanand
- Shruti Viswan as Arri
- Gitanjali Dang as Simon

== Production ==
Director Qaushiq Mukherjee said that Garbage reflected "the kind of time I was living in for the last two years, personally and social speaking." He began writing the script which was initially titled The fucked. He said that several parts of the film were based on real characters and incidents. The taxi driver and the captive girl were "composites of different people" while the protagonist was based on his friend who had died in 2017. Mukherjee said that the film was mostly unscripted and "workshop-driven." To prepare for his character, Tanmay worked as a production driver for the team for a month. Mukherjee wrote the script while dealing with the deaths of a few close ones when he said he realised that "death is the only reality."

== Reception ==
Deborah Young of The Hollywood Reporter wrote: "For lovers of his angry, dreamy, sexually violent aesthetic, Garbage does not disappoint. Jay Weissberg of Variety called it a "tiresome torture porn disguised as a femme-empowering revenge thriller." Anupam Kant Verma of Firstpost wrote: "For a film that wants to stand out from the saccharine infested world of Bollywood, Garbage ends up emulating its black and white, good and evil charms." Soumya Rao of Scroll.in felt that "the shock and horror are not just narrative tools but symptoms of the times in which we live." She also praised Trimala and Tanmay's performance, calling them "fearless".

Shubhra Gupta of The Indian Express noted that the film is "sometimes too in-your-face, the way it takes two young women and a man, flings them into terrible situations, and observes them, pitilessly, trying to negotiate those tough tangles." J Hurtado of Screen Anarchy called the film a "bold, no holds barred attack on the hypocrisy of the religious right wing in India today." Further calling it "too violent, too unafraid, and too real to even be considered as a commercial viability." He also included it in his list of 14 Favorite Indian Films of 2018.
