= Taradas Bandyopadhyay =

Bengali novelist

- তারাদাস বন্দ্যোপাধ্যায়
- Born: 15 October 1947; Barrackpore, North 24 Parganas, West Bengal, India
- Died: 18 July 2010 (aged 62); Barrackpore, North 24 Parganas, West Bengal, India
- Education: Rahara Ramakrishna Mission Boys' Home High School; Maulana Azad College; University of Calcutta
- Occupations: Short story writer, Novelist
- Children: Tathagata Bandyopadhyay
- Writing career
- Language: Bengali

Taradas Bandyopadhyay (15 October 1947 – 18 July 2010) was a Bengali novelist, short story writer and editor.

== Biography ==
Bandyopadhyay was the son of late legendary writer Bibhutibhushan Bandyopadhyay. He was born in 1947 at his maternal grandparent's home at Barrackpore in North 24 Parganas and finished his schooling at the Rahara Ramakrishna Mission Boys' Home High School in Rahara. Bandyopadhyay passed B.A. (Honours) in English from Maulana Azad College and completed post-graduation from the University of Calcutta. He worked under Government of West Bengal in the Information and Cultural Affairs Department. He spent his childhood at his paternal village-home in Bongaon.

== Literary career ==
Taradas wrote number of short stories and novels like Kaal Nirabadhi, Saptarshir Alo, Kakkhopath. His novel Kajol was a sequel to Aparajito, written by his father. Taradas had started writing Kajol immediately after passing his Higher Secondary examination. Bandyopadhyay's most notable contribution was Taranath Tantrik, an occult practitioner. The character was created by Bibhutibhushan and continued by him. Those stories were published in two books namely Taranath Tantrik (1985) and Awlatchokro (2003). Bandyopadhyay also edited Aranyak. In the year 2008, Taradas started writing his interpretation of Bibhutibhusan's life in a biography-styled series called Pita Nohsi for Udbodhan magazine, but couldn't complete it because of his death in 2010.

== Books ==
- Saptarshir Alo
- Kakkhopath
- Bandhu, Raho Raho
- Kaal Nirabodhi
- Kajol
- Tritiya Purush
- Awlatchakra
- Taranath Tantrik
