= Bibhutibhushan Bandyopadhyay =

Indian Bengali author (1894–1950)

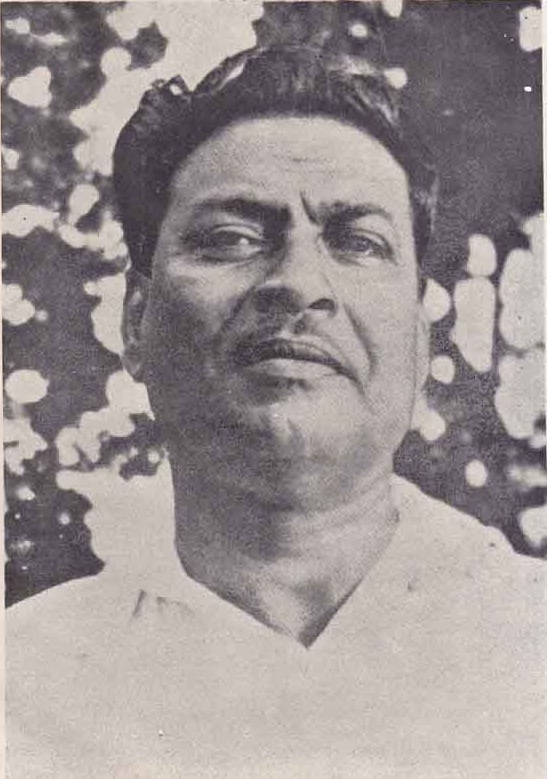
- Born: 12 September 1894; Muratipur, Bengal Presidency, British India
- Died: 1 November 1950 (aged 56); Ghatshila, Bihar, India
- Citizenship: India
- Education: Surendranath College
- Occupations: Writer, novelist, songwriter
- Spouses: Gouri Devi; Rama Chattopadhyay
- Children: Taradas Bandyopadhyay
- Parents: Mahananda Bandyopadhyay; Mrinalini Devi
- Writing career
- Notable works: Pather Panchali; Aranyak; Adarsha Hindu Hotel; Debjan; Hire Manik Jale; Chander Pahar
- Notable awards: Rabindra Puraskar (posthumous) (1951)
- Website: bibhutibhushan.in

Bibhutibhushan Bandyopadhyay (12 September 1894 – 1 November 1950) was an Indian novelist and short story writer in the Bengali language. His best known works are the autobiographical novel Pather Panchali (Song of the Road), Aparajito (Undefeated), Chander Pahar (Mountain of the Moon) and Aranyak (of the forest).

== Early life and education ==
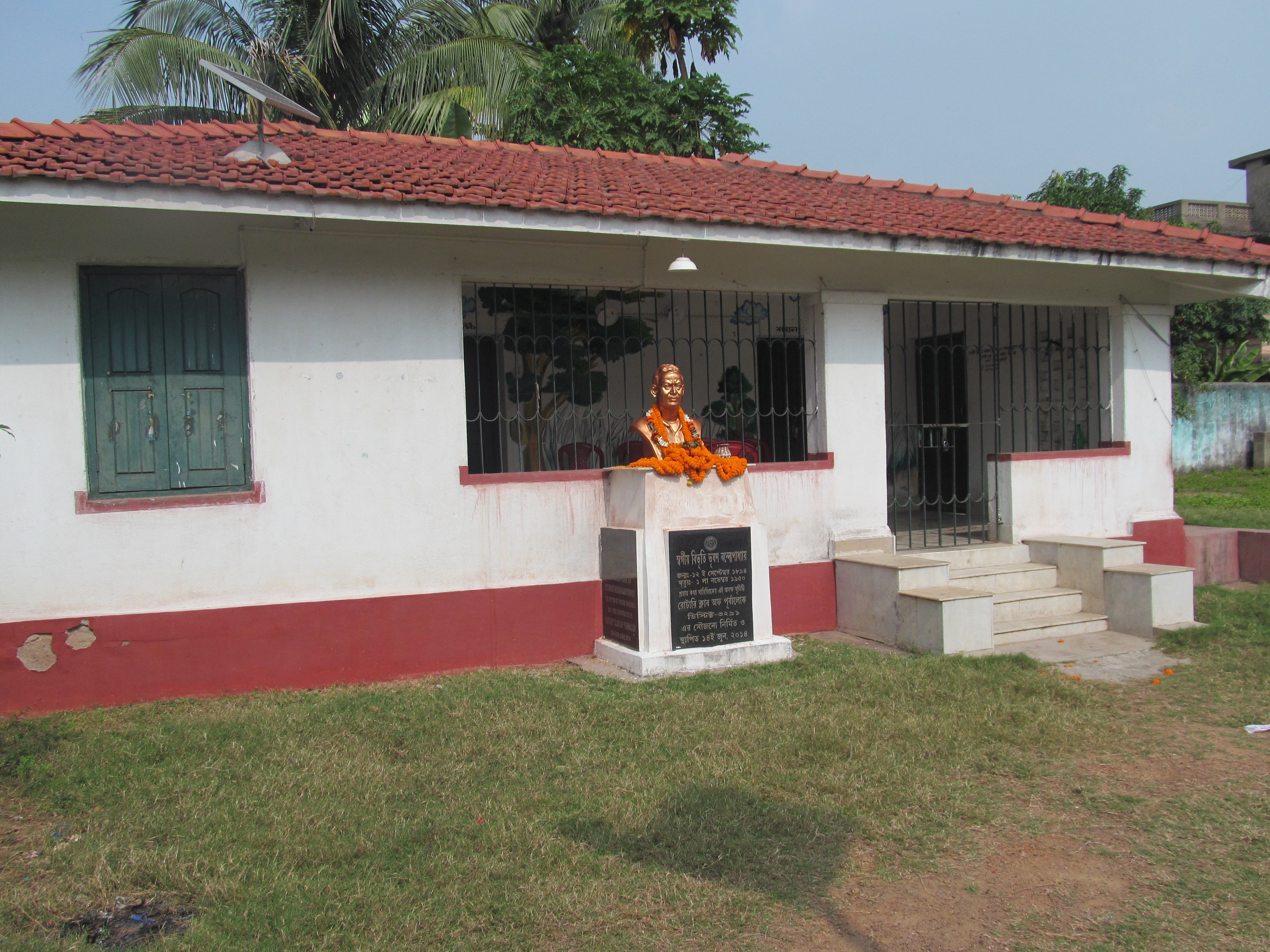
Bibhutibhusan's House Gouri Kunja at Ghatshila

The Bandyopadhyay family originated in the Panitar village near Basirhat, located in the North 24 Parganas district of modern-day West Bengal. Bandyopadhyay's great-grandfather, who was an Ayurvedic physician, eventually settled in Barrackpore village, near Gopalnagar, Banagram (now Bangaon), North 24 Parganas. However, Bandyopadhyay was born in Muratipur village, near Kalyani in Nadia, at his maternal uncle's house. His father, Mahananda Bandyopadhyay, was a Sanskrit scholar and story-teller by profession. Bandyopadhyay was the eldest of the five children of Mahananda and his wife Mrinalini. His childhood home was at Barrackpore village, near Gopalnagar, Banagram (now Bangaon), North 24 Parganas. of West Bengal.

From the fifth grade, Bandyopadhyay studied at Bongaon High School, one of the oldest institutions in British India, and was considered as a talented student. Following a first division placement in the Entrance and Intermediate Arts examinations, Bandyopadhyay completed his undergraduate degree in economics, history, and sanskrit at the Surendranath College (then Ripon College) in Kolkata. He was admitted to the master's degree (MA) and Law classes, but could not afford to enroll for the postgraduate course at the University of Calcutta, and joined as a teacher in a school in Jangipara, Jangipara D N High School, Hooghly.

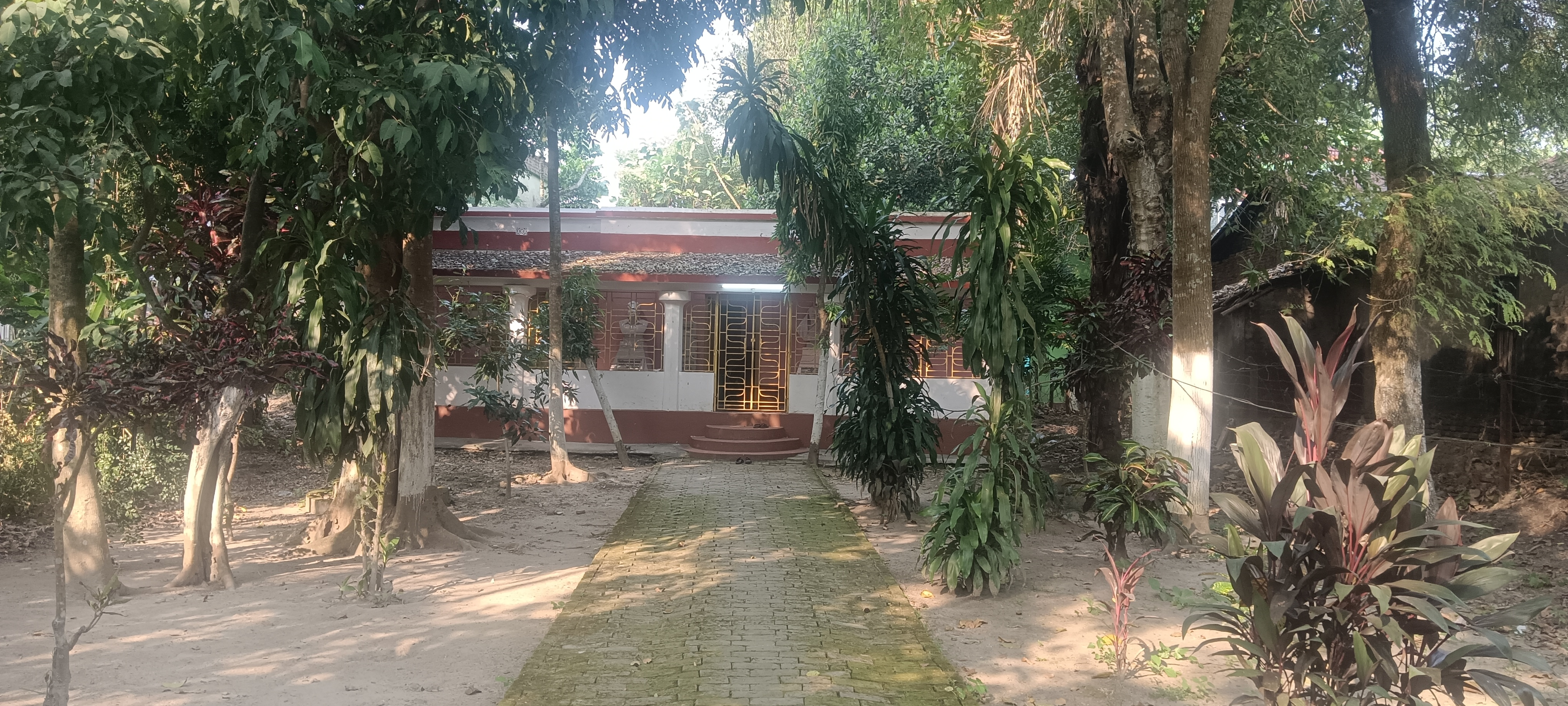
Bibhutibhushan Bandhopadhyay's ancestral home is in Barakpur village near Bangaon in North 24 Parganas district.

== Career ==
Bandyopadhyay worked in a variety of jobs to support both himself and his family before becoming a writer. His first job was as a teacher, but he also served as a travelling publicist for Goraksini Sabha, and later as a secretary for Khelatchandra Ghosh, a role that included the management of his Bhagalpur estate. He became involved with Khelatchandra, a prominent name in music and charity, while tutoring his family. He also taught at the Khelatchandra Memorial School. Eventually, Bandyopadhyay returned to his native place. He started working as a teacher in the Gopalnagar Haripada Institution, which he continued alongside his literary work, until his death. He wrote and published Pather Panchali while staying at Ghatshila, a town in Jharkhand.

== Works ==
Bandyopadhyay's works are largely set in rural Bengal, with characters from that area. Several of his novels are set in Bongaon, including Pather Panchali, Adarsha Hindu Hotel, Ichamati, and Bipiner Sansar while his Aranyak is set in a forest in Bhagalpur. In 1921, Bandyopadhyay's first published short story, "Upekshita" appeared in Prabasi, at the time one of Bengal's leading literary magazines. However, he did not receive any critical attention until 1928, when his first novel Pather Panchali (also known in English as Song of the Little Road) was published (initially as a serial, then as a book in 1929). Pather Panchali brought Bandyopadhyay to prominence in Bengali literature, and the novel and its sequel Aparajito, were subsequently translated into numerous languages. Additionally, these two were made into films by Satyajit Ray, and together with Apur Sansar, formed the highly successful Apu Trilogy. Ray referred aspiring scriptwriters to the works of Bandyopadhyay, and praised him by saying, "His lines fit the characters so well, they are so revealing that even when the author provides no physical description, every character seems to present itself before us simply through the words it speaks". His creation Taranath Tantrik was popular for the Bengali reader and the series was extended by his son Taradas.

=== Critical reception ===
Amit Chaudhuri has translated a few excerpts from the novel for inclusion in the anthology, The Picador Book of Modern Indian Literature. In his introduction to these excerpts, Chaudhuri wrote, "Unique for its tenderness and poetry ... Pather Panchali rejects both nineteenth-century realism and social realism (the social milieu described in it would have logically lent itself to the latter) for an inquiry into perception and memory." The complete text of Aparajito has been translated into English by Gopa Majumdar. The novel Aranyak has been translated into English in January 2017 by Suchismita Banerjee Rai, and it has been published by Mitra and Ghosh Publishers based in Kolkata. His novels Ashani Sanket and Ichhamati have been translated into English respectively as Distant Thunder and Ichhamoti by Chhanda Chattopadhyay Bewtra and published by Parabaas.

Martin Seymour-Smith, in his Guide to Modern World Literature (1973), describes Bandyopadhyay (he uses the form Banerji) as "perhaps the best of all modern Indian novelists", going on to write that, "probably nothing in twentieth-century Indian literature, in prose or poetry, comes to the level of Pather Panchali". He was posthumously awarded the Rabindra Puraskar in 1951, a literary award in West Bengal, for his novel Ichhamati.

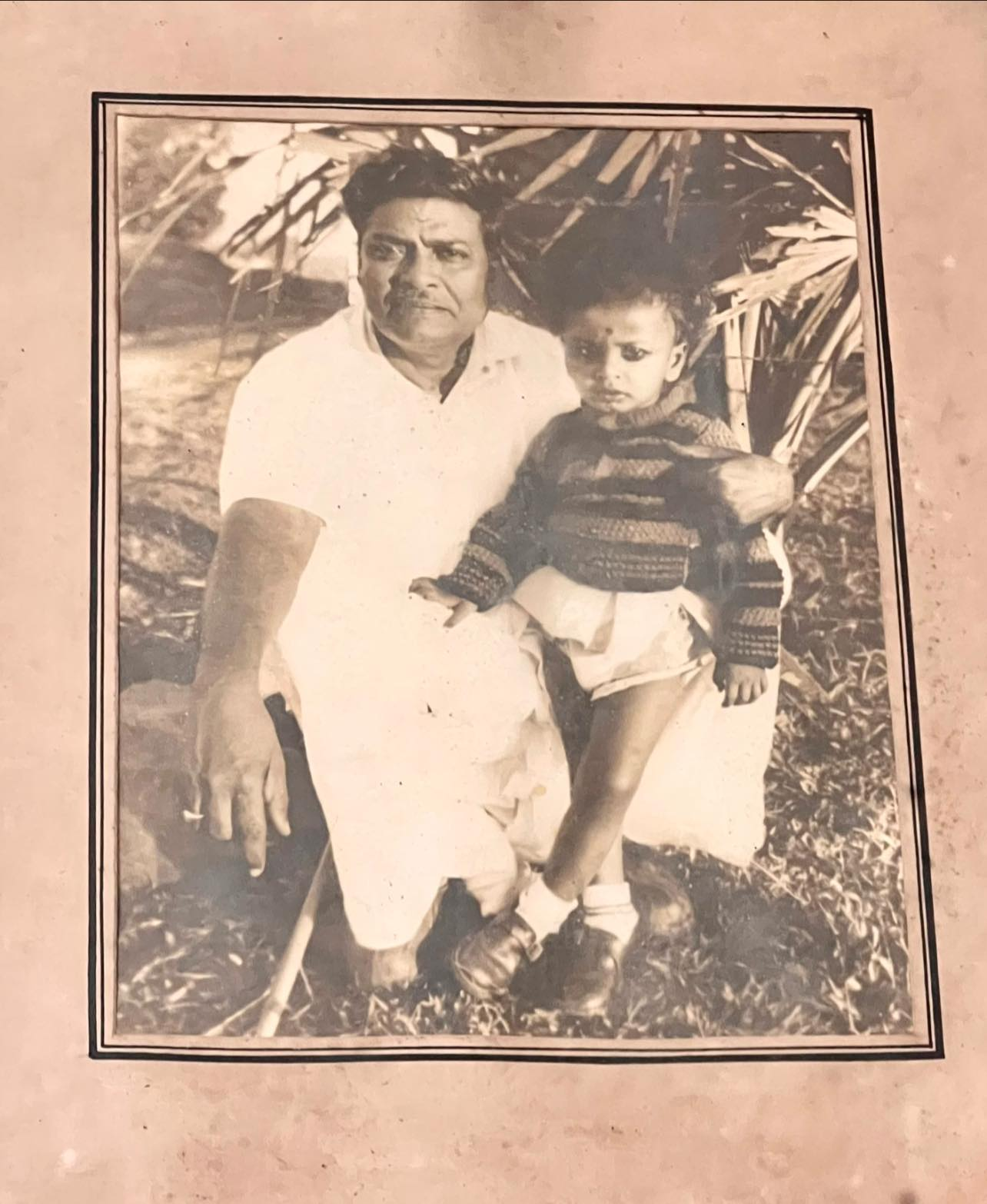
Author Bibhutibhusan Bandhopadhyay and his son Taradas Bandhopadhyay

=== Death ===
Bandopadhyay died on 1 November 1950, in Ghatshila. The cause of death was identified as a heart attack. His house in Ghatshila, named Gouri Kunj after his wife has been preserved by the Government of Jharkhand.

== Bibliography ==
Complete list of novels

- Pather Panchali (Song of the Road)
- Aparajito
- Aranyak (In the Forest)
- Adarsha Hindu Hotel
- Ichhamati (Rabindra Puraskar 1950–51)
- Dristi Pradeep
- Chander Pahar
- Hire Manik Jale
- Debjan
- Bipiner Sangsar
- Anubartan
- Ashani Sanket
- Kedar Raja
- Dampati
- Sundarbane Sat Batsar
- Dui Bari
- Maroner Danka Baje
- Mismider Kabach

Partial list of short story collections

- Megha Mallar
- Mauriphool
- Jatrabadol
- Jonmo o Mrittu
- Kinnardal
- Taal Nabami
- Benigir Fulbari
- Nabagata

== Filmography ==
Filmography based on his Bibliography are

- Pather Panchali (1955)
- Aparajito (1956)
- Adarsha Hindu Hotel (1957)
- Apur Sansar (1959)
- Baksa Badal (1970)
- Nishi Padma (1970) based on short story Hinger Kochuri.
- Amar Prem (1972) based on short story Hinger Kochuri.
- Nimantran (1971)
- Ashani Sanket (1973)
- Alo (2003)
- Talnabami (2003)
- Bhalobasar Onek Naam (2006)
- Chander Pahar (2013)
- Sahaj Paather Gappo (Colours of Innocence) (2017) based on the story Taal Nabami.
- Avijatrik (2021) based on the concluding part of the novel Aparajito

== See also ==
- List of Indian writers
