= Adarsha Hindu Hotel (film) =

1957 Bengali film

Adarsha Hindu Hotel is a Bengali drama film directed by Ardhendu Sen based on the same name novel of Bibhutibhushan Bandyopadhyay. This film was released on 31 May 1957 under the banner of Sreelekha Pictures.

== Plot ==
The plot revolves around two rival hotels near Ranaghat railway station. One run by Bechu Chakraborty with an excellent cook, Hajari Thakur. Padma, a maidservant of the hotel, steals some utensils and falsely alleges Hajari and the police arrest him. After he is release from the jail, Hajari starts his new business of Adarsha Hindu Hotel which becomes the most popular in the town. He gets the railway contract to start the hotel in the station.

== Cast ==
- Chhabi Biswas
- Dhiraj Bhattacharya as Hajari Thakur
- Jahar Ganguly as Bechu
- Sabitri Chatterjee
- Tulsi Chakraborty
- Jahor Roy
- Anup Kumar
- Sova Sen
- Sandhyarani as Padma
- Sikha Bag
