= Gopalnagar, North 24 Parganas =

Gopalnagar
- Village
- Location in West Bengal, India Gopalnagar (India)
- Coordinates: 23.06479°N 88.760568°E
- Country: India
- State: West Bengal
- District: North 24 Parganas

Population (2011)
  - Total: 2,174

Languages
  - Official: Bengali, English
- Time zone: UTC+5:30 (IST)
- PIN: 743262 (Gopalnagar)
- Telephone/STD code: 03215
- Lok Sabha constituency: Bangaon
- Vidhan Sabha constituency: Bangaon Uttar
- Website: north24parganas.nic.in

Gopalnagar is a village and a gram panchayat in the Bangaon CD block in the Bangaon subdivision of the North 24 Parganas district in the state of West Bengal, India.

== Geography ==
Cities, towns and locations in Bangaon subdivision, North 24 Parganas district
M: municipal town, CT: census town, R: rural/ urban centre, T: place of tourist interest
Owing to space constraints in the small map, the actual locations in a larger map may vary slightly

=== Location ===
Gopalnagar is located at 23.06479°N 88.760568°E.

=== Area overview ===
The area shown in the map was a part of Jessore district from 1883. At the time of Partition of Bengal (1947) the Radcliffe Line placed the police station areas of Bangaon and Gaighata of Jessore district in India and the area was made a part of 24 Parganas district.

The renowned novelist Bibhutibhushan Bandopadhyay (of Pather Panchali fame) belonged to this area and many of his writings portray his experience in the area.

It is a flat plain located in the lower Ganges Delta.

In the densely populated area, 16.33% of the population lives in the urban areas and 83.67% lives in the rural areas.

Note: The map alongside presents some of the notable locations in the subdivision. All places marked in the map are linked in the larger full screen map.

== Civic administration ==
=== Police station ===
Gopalnagar police station covers an area of 169 km^{2} and serves a population of 380,793. It has jurisdiction over Bangaon CD Block.

== Demographics ==
According to the 2011 Census of India, Gopalnagar had a total population of 2,174, of which 1,106 (51%) were males and 1,068 (49%) were females. Population in the age range 0–6 years was 199. The total number of literate persons in Gopalnagar was 1,688 (85.47% of the population over 6 years).

== Economy ==
There four banks located in the village, belonging to the Gopalnagar branch of the State Bank of India, Punjab National Bank, Bandhan Bank & RBL Bank.

== Transport ==
SH 1 runs through Gopalnagar.

Gopalnagar-Ranaghat road via Majhergram, Gopalnagar-Duttapulia road via sindrani, and Gopalnagar-Chowberia road are some important roads of Gopalnagar.

Gopalnagar railway station is part of the Kolkata Suburban Railway system. It is located on the Bangaon–Ranaghat line.

=== Bus service ===
- Route 20-Chakdaha-Bangaon (via Bishnupur, Gopalnagar)
- Route 28-Chakdaha-Bangaon (via Nimtala, Gopalnagar)
- Route 95-Ashoknagar-Bangaon (via Habra, Gopalnagar)

== Education ==
Gopalnagar Haripada Institution is a boys school from V to X and co-educational school from XI to XII. The renowned author Bibhutibhushan Bandyopadhyay taught in this school.

Gopalnagar Giribala Balika Vidyalaya is a girls only higher secondary school.

== Notable residents ==
- Bibhutibhushan Bandyopadhyay
- Dinabandhu Mitra - playwright born in the village
