= Qaushiq Mukherjee =

Indian film director

Qaushiq Mukherjee (born 1973), popularly known as Q, dubbed as "India's most dangerous filmmaker", is an independent film director known for his avant-garde cinematography. He is perhaps most famous for directing his controversial feature Gandu, which became the first Indian film to feature graphical nudity and unsimulated sex. Many of his films and webseries include such transgressive elements. An online magazine referred to him as the "Gaspar Noe of India".

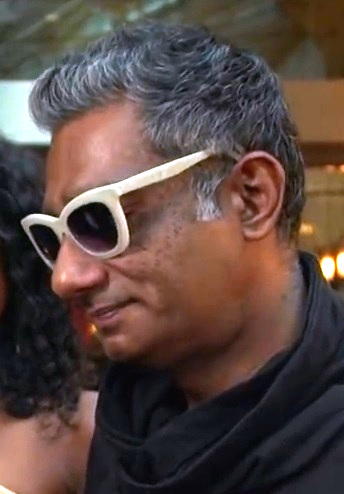
Q (Qaushiq Mukherjee) in 2018

== Criticism of Satyajit Ray ==
In 2016, when Sandip Ray's Double Feluda was released, Q vouched criticism for the film by posting a link to a blog post, with captions containing "F**k Manik. F**k felu. F**k babu." Q was harshly criticised in Tollywood, particularly by Saheb Bhattacharya and Srijit Mukherjee. Since then, he expressed openly his disdain for Satyajit Ray, claiming that the Tollywood industry has become stale for Bengalis love clinging to Ray's legacy.

== Filmography ==
- 2019: Taranath Tantrik (web-series)
- 2018: Zero KMS (web-series)
- 2018: Garbage
- 2018: Nabarun (documentary on writer Nabarun Bhattacharya)
- 2020: Sari (documentary)
- 2016: Brahman Naman
- 2015: Ludo
- 2015: X: Past Is Present
- 2012: Tasher Desh
- 2010: Gandu
- 2009: Love in India
- 2009: Bishh
- 2004: Le Pocha
