= Azamabad =

Azamabad اعظم آباد
- Village
- Location within Iran
- Coordinates: 34°49′56″N 46°58′56″E
- Country: Iran
- Province: Kurdistan
- County: Kamyaran
- Bakhsh: Central
- Rural District: Bilavar

Population (2006)
  - Total: 216
- Time zone: UTC+3:30 (IRST)
  - Summer (DST): UTC+4:30 (IRDT)

Azamabad (Persian: اعظم آباد, also Romanized as A‘zamābād and ‘Az̧amābād) is a village in Bilavar Rural District, in the Central District of Kamyaran County, Kurdistan Province, Iran. At the 2006 census, its population was 216, in 53 families. The village is populated by Kurds.
