= Ramananda Chatterjee =

Indian magazine editor

Ramananda Chatterjee রামানন্দ চট্টোপাধ্যায়
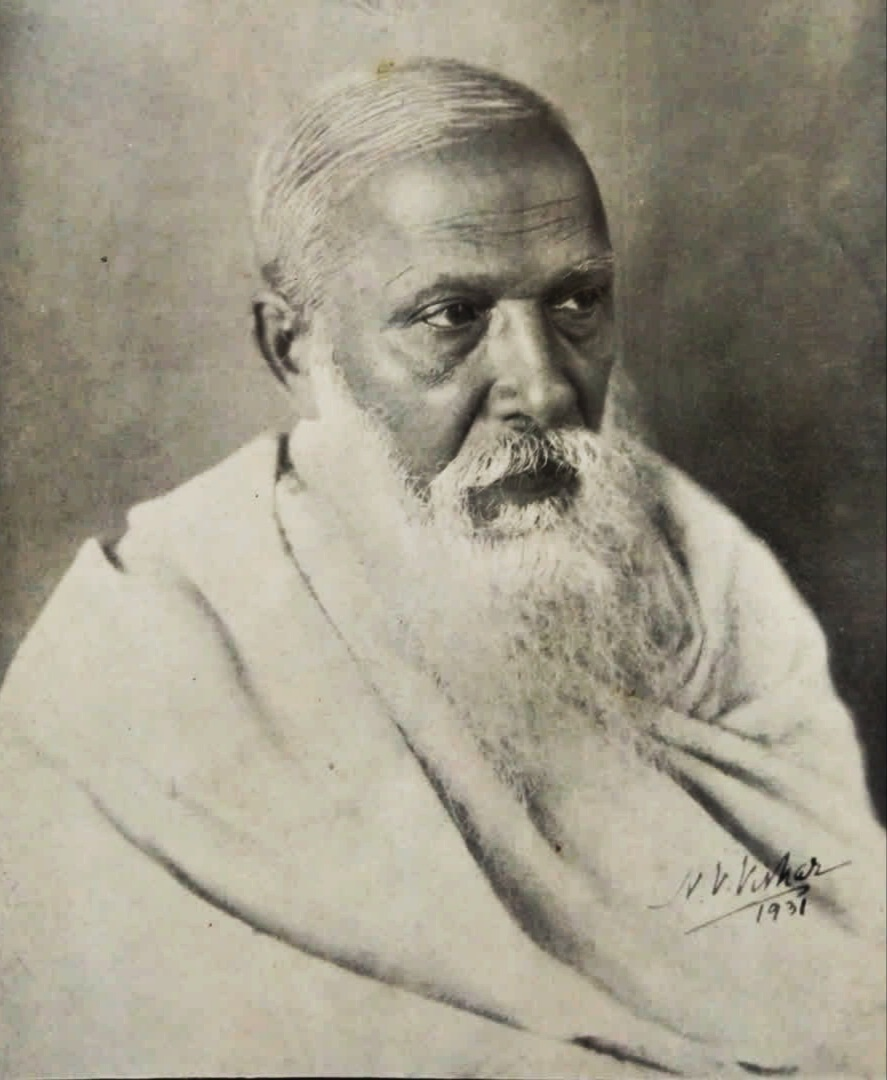
- Born: 29 May 1865; Bankura, Bengal, British India (present-day West Bengal, India)
- Died: 30 September 1943 (aged 78); Kolkata, Bengal, British India
- Occupations: Journalist, Editor
- Children: Kedarnath Chattopadhyay
- Parent(s): Srinath Chattopadhyay; Harasundari Devi

Ramananda Chatterjee (Bengali: রামানন্দ চট্টোপাধ্যায়; 29 May 1865 – 30 September 1943) was the founder, editor, and owner of the Calcutta based magazine, the Modern Review. He has been described as the Father of Indian Journalism.

== Early life ==
Chatterjee was born in 1865 to a middle class Bengali Hindu Brahmin family, the third child to Srinath Chattopadhyay and Harasundari Devi, in the village of Pathakpara in the district of Bankura. He received his primary education in a Bengali medium school, even though primary education the English medium had become available by then in Bankura. As a child he liked poetry and soon he was drawn to patriotism through the poems of Rangalal Bandyopadhyay.

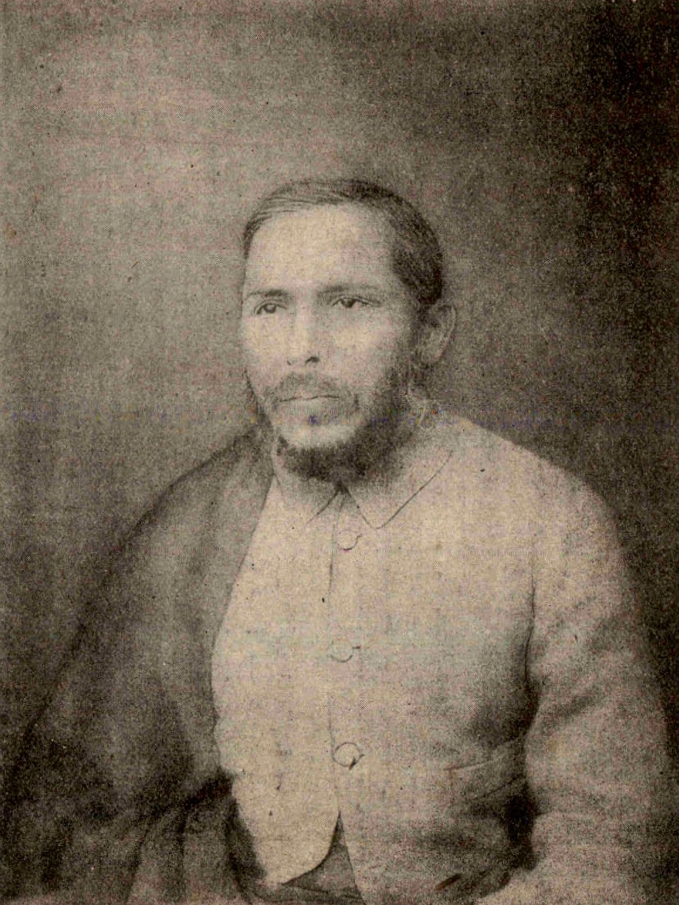
Chatterjee in 1909

Chaterjee passed Student-Scholarship Examination in 1875 from Bankura Banga Vidyalaya. He passed the Entrance from Bankura Zilla School in 1883 arrived at Kolkata to pursue higher education. In 1885, he passed the F.A. from the St. Xavier's College and took admission in the City College. In 1888, he appeared in the B.A. from City College and stood first class first in the University of Calcutta. He won the Ripon Scholarship of rupees fifty per month. Pleased at the success of Chatterjee, Heramba Chandra Maitra offered him the post of assistant editor at the Indian Messenger, the mouthpiece of Sadharan Brahmo Samaj, of which he was the editor at that time. This offer opened up Chatterjee's future career in journalism.

In 1890, he completed his Master of Arts degree in English at the University of Calcutta.

== Career ==
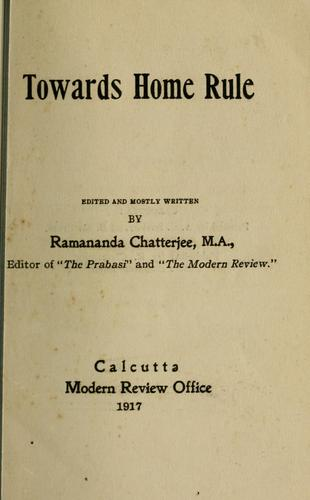
Towards Home Rule, written in 1917.

In 1893, Chatterjee joined the City College as a lecturer. Along with Jagadish Chandra Bose, he founded the illustrated children's magazine Mukul with Sivanath Sastri as the editor.

In 1895, Chatterjee moved to Allahabad to teach at the Kayastha Pathshala. In 1897, Chatterjee became the chief editor of Bengali language literary magazine Pradip. He left Pradip owing to differences in opinion and subsequently launched Prabasi in 1901. Prabasi means a Bengali living outside Bengal.

In 1907, Chatterjee launched the English language magazine Modern Review, which he edited until 1942. He went on to found two others, the third being the Hindi language Vishal Bharat (magazine).

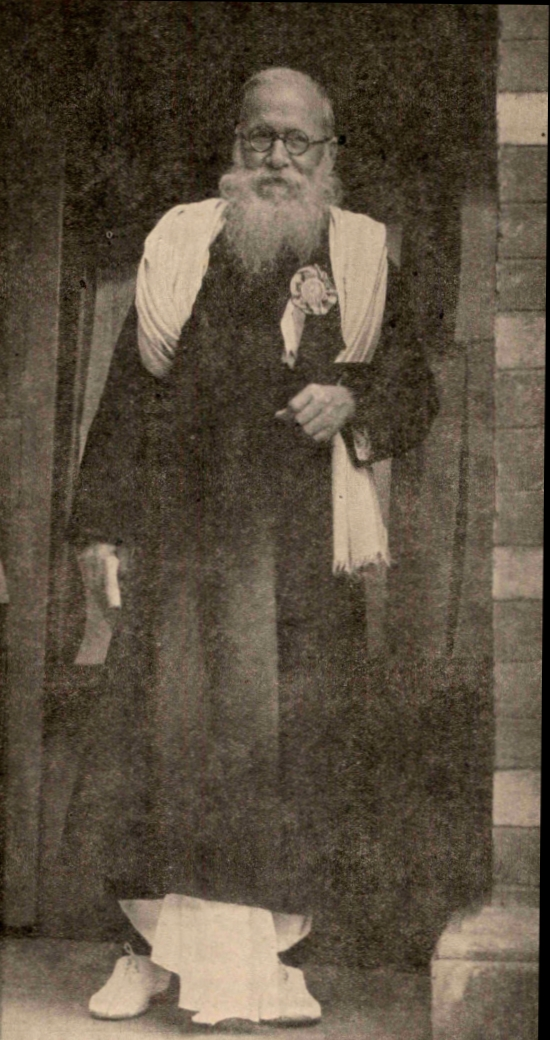
Chatterjee in 1940

In 1929, Chaterjee published an Indian edition of India in Bondage Her Right to Freedom, written by American Unitarian minister Jabez T. Sunderland, with his printer Sajami Das. For his publication of the work, Chaterjee was charged with sedition, was arrested and was given a fine of 1,000 rupees and a jail sentence of three months. The book was also banned.

In 1932, Chaterjee attended a Unity Conference in Allahabad, representing Bengali Hindus.

== Death ==
Chatterjee died in 1943.
