= Modern Review (Calcutta) =

English language Indian magazine

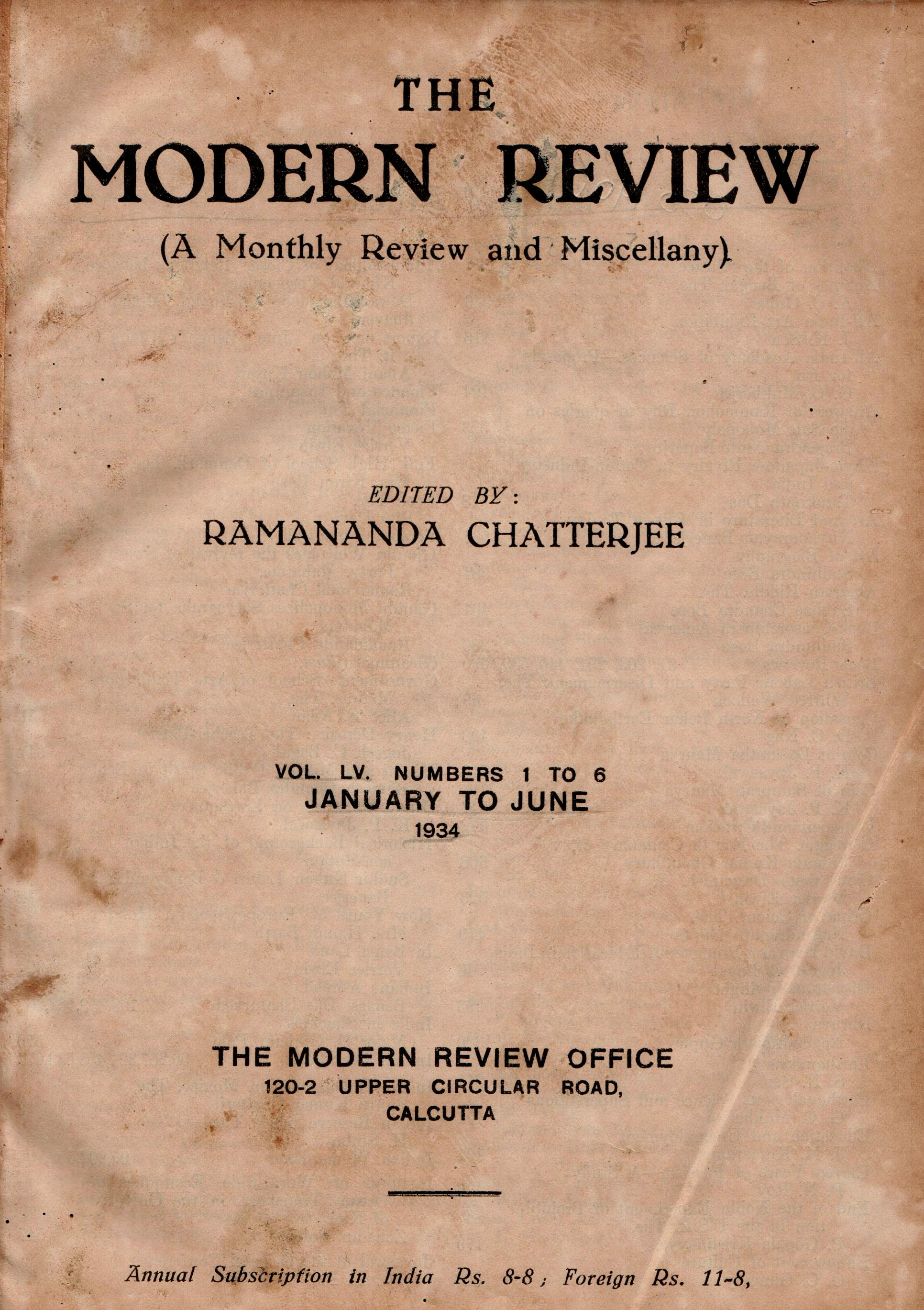
- Title page
- Editor: Ramananda Chatterjee
- Categories: Political magazine
- Frequency: Monthly
- First issue: January 1907
- Final issue: 1995
- Country: British India
- Language: English

The Modern Review was a monthly magazine published in Calcutta founded and edited by Ramananda Chatterjee. It was in circulation between 1907 and 1995. The magazine emerged as an important forum for the Indian nationalist intelligentsia. It carried essays on politics, economics, sociology, as well as poems, stories, travelogues, and sketches. Radhakamal Mukerjee published his early, pioneering essays on environmental degradation in India here and Verrier Elwin reports from the Gond country were first published here. Numerous other friends of India including Rev. Jabez T. Sunderland wrote regularly for the magazine. Another indication of the journal's stature was the publication, within its pages, of Jawaharlal Nehru's pseudonymous autocritique Rashtrapati, by 'Chanakya' in November 1937. Ramachandra Guha indicates that alone was evidence that it was "leading journal of the progressive Indian intelligentsia."

== Overview ==
The Modern Review had a sister magazine Prabasi, which was published in Bengali — Modern Review appeared in English. With a broadly nationalistic outlook, it did not follow the line of any particular political party. This meant that it could act as an all-India forum and that it stood apart from party journals concurrently run by the Indian National Congress, the Communists, the Muslim League, the Khaksar Tehrik Hindu Mahasabha, and the Scheduled Castes Federation. Its only real competitor was the Indian Social Reformer.

The Hindu Guru Swami Nigamananda's collection Thakurer Chithi was published in this magazine in 1941 (other reference date:26 December 1938).

== See also ==
- Thakurer Chithi
- Drighangchoo
