= Peter Handke bibliography =

Peter Handke (born 6 December 1942) is an Austrian novelist, playwright, translator, poet, film director, and screenwriter.

== Bibliography ==
=== Prose fiction ===
- 1966 Die Hornissen, (The Hornets), novel
- 1967 Begrüßung des Aufsichtsrates, (Welcoming the Supervisor), prose texts
- 1967 Der Hausierer, (The Peddler), novel
- 1970 Die Angst des Tormanns beim Elfmeter, (The Goalie's Anxiety at the Penalty Kick), novel and screenplay of the 1972 film of the same name
- 1970 Geschichten aus dem Wienerwald von Ödön von Horvath, (Stories from the Wienerwald by Ödön von Horvath), re-narration
- 1971 Chronik der laufenden Ereignisse, (Chronicle of Current Events), novel
- 1972 Der kurze Brief zum langen Abschied, (Short Letter, Long Farewell), novel
- 1972 Wunschloses Unglück, (A Sorrow Beyond Dreams: A Life Story), memoir
- 1975 Die Stunde der wahren Empfindung, (A Moment of True Feeling), novel
- 1975 Falsche Bewegung, (Wrong Move), novel
- 1976 Die linkshänige Frau (The Left-Handed Woman), novel
- 1979 Langsame Heimkehr, (The Long Way Round), novella, first part of Slow Homecoming
- 1980 Die Lehre der Sainte-Victoire, (The Lesson of Mount Sainte-Victoire), novella, second part of Slow Homecoming
- 1981 Kindergeschichte, (Children's Story), novella, third part of Slow Homecoming
- 1983 Der Chinese des Schmerzes, (Across), story
- 1986 Die Wiederholung, (Repetition), novel
- 1987 Nachmittag eines Schriftstellers, (Afternoon of a Writer), story
- 1994 Mein Jahr in der Niemandsbucht. Ein Märchen aus den neuen Zeiten, (My Year in the No-Man's-Bay), novel
- 1997 In einer dunklen Nacht ging ich aus meinem stillen Haus, (On a Dark Night I Left My Silent House), story
- 2002 Der Bildverlust oder Durch die Sierra de Gredos, (Crossing the Sierra de Gredos), novel
- 2004 Don Juan (erzählt von ihm selbst), (Don Juan - His Own Version), novel
- 2007 Kali. Eine Vorwintergeschichte, novel
- 2008 Die morawische Nacht, (The Moravian Night), novel
- 2017 Die Obstdiebin. Oder Einfache Fahrt ins Landesinnere, novel ISBN 978-3-518-42757-6
- 2020 Das zweite Schwert, novel ISBN 978-3-518-42940-2
- 2011 Der große Fall, ISBN 978-3-518-42218-2, story
- 2011 Die Geschichte des Dragoljub Milanović, ISBN 978-3-902497-93-2, story
- 2012 Versuch über den Stillen Ort, ISBN 978-3-518-42317-2, story
- 2013 Versuch über den Pilznarren. Eine Geschichte für sich, ISBN 978-3-518-42383-7, story
- 2023 Die Ballade des letzten Gastes, ISBN 978-3-518-43154-2, novel

=== Poetry ===
- 1969 Die Innenwelt der Außenwelt der Innenwelt, (The Innerworld of the Outerworld of the Innerworld), text collages
- 1969 Deutsche Gedichte, German Poems, poetry
- 1977 Das Ende des Flanierens. Gedichte, (Strolling Comes to an End. Poems)
- 1986 Gedicht an die Dauer, (To Duration), long poem
- 1987 Gedichte, (Poems)

=== Plays and screenplays ===
- 1966 Publikumsbeschimpfung und andere Sprechstücke, (Offending the Audience and Other Spoken Plays), play, English version in Offending the Audience and Self-accusation
- 1967 Kaspar, play, English version also in Kaspar and Other Plays
- 1969 Das Mündel will Vormund sein, (The Ward Wants To Be Warden), play
- 1970 Wind und Meer. Vier Hörspiele, (Wind and Sea: Four Radio Plays)
- 1971 Der Ritt über den Bodensee, (The Ride across Lake Constance), play
- 1972 Stücke 1, (Plays 1)
- 1973 Die Unvernünftigen sterben aus, (They Are Dying Out), play
- 1973 Stücke 2, (Plays 2)
- 1976 Die linkshändige Frau, (The Left-Handed Woman), film version 1977
- 1981 Über die Dörfer, (Walk about the Villages), verse drama
- 1987 Der Himmel über Berlin, (Wings of Desire) with Wim Wenders, screenplay
- 1987 Die Abwesenheit. Ein Märchen, (Absence), film version directed by Handke in 1992
- 1989 Das Spiel vom Fragen oder Die Reise zum sonoren Land, (Voyage to the Sonorous Land or the Art of Asking), play
- 1992 Die Stunde, da wir nichts voneinander wußten, (The Hour We Knew Nothing Of Each Other), wordless play
- 1992 Die Theaterstücke, (The Theatrical Plays)
- 1997 Zurüstungen für die Unsterblichkeit. Königsdrama, (Preparations for Immortality: A Royal Drama), play
- 2002 Untertagblues. Ein Stationendrama, (Underground Blues: a Station Play), play
- 2006 Spuren der Verirrten, play
- 2010 Immer noch Sturm (Storm Still), a play about the Slovenian uprising against Hitler in 1945, ISBN 978-3-518-42131-4; first performance: Salzburg Festival 2011
- 2012 Die schönen Tage von Aranjuez. Ein Sommerdialog, ISBN 978-3-518-42311-0, play
- 2015 Die Unschuldigen, ich und die Unbekannte am Rand der Landstraße. Ein Schauspiel in vier Jahreszeiten, ISBN 978-3-518-42472-8, play

=== Miscellaneous ===
- 1969 Prosa, Gedichte, Theaterstücke, Hörspiele, Aufsätze, (Prose, Poems, Plays, Radio Plays, Essays), collected texts
- 1974 Als das Wünschen noch geholfen hat. Gedichte, Aufsätze, Texte, Fotos, (When Hope still Helped: Poems, Essays, Texts, Photos)
- 1975 Der Rand der Wörter. Erzählungen, Gedichte, Stücke, (The Words' Edge: Stories, Poems, Plays)

=== Non-fiction ===
- 1972 Ich bin ein Bewohner des Elfenbeinturms, (I Am a Resident of the Ivory Tower), essays
- 1977 Das Gewicht der Welt. Ein Journal, (The Weight of the World. A Journal), texts
- 1982 Die Geschichte des Bleistifts, (History of the Pencil), texts
- 1984 Phantasien der Wiederholung, (Phantasies of Repetition), journal
- 1989 Versuch über die Müdigkeit, (Essay About Tiredness), essay
- 1990 Noch einmal für Thukydides, (Once Again for Thucydides)', texts
- 1990 Versuch über die Jukebox, (Essay About the Jukebox), Engl. version in The Jukebox and Other Essays on Storytelling.
- 1991 Abschied des Träumers vom Neunten Land, (The Dreamer's Farewell to the Ninth Country), texts
- 1991 Versuch über den geglückten Tag. Ein Wintertagtraum, (Essay about the Successful Day: A Winter Day's Dream), essay
- 1992 Drei Versuche. Versuch über die Müdigkeit. Versuch über die Jukebox. Versuch über den geglückten Tag, (Three Essays: about Tiredness; Essay about the Jukebox; Essay about the Successful Day), essay
- 1992 Langsam im Schatten. Gesammelte Verzettelungen 1980-1992, (Slowly in the Shade: Collected Dispersals 1980-1992), texts
- 1994 Die Kunst des Fragens, (The Art of Questioning), texts
- 1996 Eine winterliche Reise zu den Flüssen Donau, Save, Morawa und Drina oder Gerechtigkeit für Serbien, (A Journey to the Rivers: Justice for Serbia), essay
- 1996 Sommerlicher Nachtrag zu einer winterlichen Reise, (A Summer Addendum to a Winter's Journey), essay
- 1998 Am Felsfenster morgens. Und andere Ortszeiten 1982 - 1987, (At the Mountain Window in the Morning: And Other Local Times 1982 - 1987), texts
- 1998 Ein Wortland. Eine Reise durch Kärnten, Slowenien, Friaul, Istrien und Dalmatien, with Liesl Ponger, (A Land of Words: A Journey through Carinthia, Slovenia, Friaul, Istria and Dalmatia), essay
- 1999 Die Fahrt im Einbaum oder Das Stück zum Film vom Krieg, (Voyage by Dugout), play
- 1999 Lucie im Wald mit den Dingsda. Mit 11 Skizzen des Autors, (Lucie in the Forest with the Thingie), texts
- 2000 Unter Tränen fragend. Nachträgliche Aufzeichnungen von zwei Jugoslawien-Durchquerungen im Krieg, März und April 1999, (Asking through the Tears: Belated Chronicle from two Crossings through Yugoslavia During the War, March and April 1999), texts
- 2002 Mündliches und Schriftliches. Zu Büchern, Bildern und Filmen 1992-2000, (Spoken and Written: about Books, Images and Films 1992-2000), essays
- 2005 Die Tablas von Daimiel, (The Tablas of Daimiel), essay
- 2005 Gestern unterwegs, (Travelling Yesterday), texts
- 2009 Die Kuckucke von Velica Hoca, intimate reportage of a Serbian enclave in Kosovo
- 2015 Tage und Werke. Begleitschreiben, ISBN 978-3-518-42492-6, essay
- 2015 Notizbuch - 31. August 1978 – 18. Oktober 1978, ISBN 978-3-458-19367-8, journal
- 2016 Vor der Baumschattenwand nachts. Zeichen und Anflüge von der Peripherie 2007–2015, ISBN 978-3-99027-083-7, journal

== English editions ==
Many of Handke's works have been published in several English-speaking countries by different publishers. Only one edition of each work is listed.

- 1970 Kaspar and Other Plays, Hill and Wang, ISBN 0-8090-1546-3
- 1971 Offending the Audience/Self-accusation, Methuen Publishing Ltd, ISBN 0-416-19570-9
- 1972 The Goalie's Anxiety at the Penalty Kick, Farrar Straus & Giroux, ISBN 0-374-16376-6
- 1973 The Ride Across Lake Constance, Methuen Publishing Ltd, ISBN 0-413-29690-3
- 1974 Slow Homecoming, Collier Books, ISBN 0-02-051530-8
- 1974 Short Letter, Long Farewell, Farrar Straus & Giroux, ISBN 0-374-26318-3
- 1974 The Innerworld of the Outerworld of the Innerworld, A Continuum Book/The Seabury Press, ISBN 0-374-28745-7
- 1976 They Are Dying Out, Eyre Methuen, ISBN 0-413-33690-5
- 1976 Ride Across Lake Constance and Other Plays, Noonday Press, ISBN 0-374-51272-8
- 1976 Nonsense and Happiness, Urizen Books, ISBN 0-916354-20-2
- 1977 A Moment of True Feeling, Farrar Straus & Giroux, ISBN 0-374-17291-9
- 1978 The Left-Handed Woman, Farrar Straus & Giroux, ISBN 0-374-18497-6
- 1979 Two Novels by Peter Handke, Avon, ISBN 0-380-48033-6
- 1984 3 X Handke, Collier Books, ISBN 0-02-020761-1
- 1984 The Weight of the World, Farrar Straus & Giroux, ISBN 0-374-28745-7
- 1985 Three by Peter Handke, Avon, ISBN 0-380-00968-4
- 1986 Across, Farrar Straus & Giroux, ISBN 0-374-52764-4
- 1988 Repetition, Farrar Straus & Giroux, ISBN 0-374-24934-2
- 1989 The Afternoon of a Writer, Farrar Straus & Giroux, ISBN 0-374-10207-4
- 1990 Absence, Farrar Straus & Giroux, ISBN 0-374-10022-5
- 1994 The Jukebox and Other Essays on Storytelling, Farrar Straus & Giroux, ISBN 0-374-18054-7
- 1996 Walk About the Villages : A Dramatic Poem, Farrar Straus & Giroux, ISBN 1-57241-000-0
- 1996 Voyage to the Sonorous Land : Or the Art of Asking and the Hour We Knew Nothing of Each Other, Yale University Press, ISBN 0-300-06273-7
- 1997 A Journey to the Rivers : Justice for Serbia, Viking, ISBN 0-670-87341-1
- 1998 Once Again for Thucydides, New Directions Publishing Corporation, ISBN 0-8112-1388-9
- 1998 My Year in the No-Man's-Bay , Farrar Straus & Giroux, ISBN 0-374-17547-0
- 2000 On a Dark Night I Left My Silent House, Farrar Straus & Giroux, ISBN 0-374-17547-0
- 2001 A Sorrow Beyond Dreams, Pushkin Press, ISBN 978-1-901285-17-8
- 2002 A Sorrow Beyond Dreams, New York Review Books Classics, ISBN 1-59017-019-9
- 2003 Handke Plays, Methuen Publishing Ltd, ISBN 0-413-68090-8
- 2007 Crossing the Sierra de Gredos, Farrar Straus & Giroux, ISBN 0-374-28154-8
- 2009 Voyage by Dugout, Performing Arts Journal, May 2012
- 2009 Slow Homecoming, NYRB Classics, ISBN 978-1-59017-307-7
- 2010 Don Juan - His Own Version, Farrar, Straus & Giroux, ISBN 978-0-374-14231-5
- 2010 Till day you do part, or, A question of light, Seagull Books, ISBN 978-1-906-49773-6
- 2014 Storm Still, Seagull Books, ISBN 978-0857421814
- 2015 To Duration, The Last Books, ISBN 978-94-91780-01-1
- 2016 The Moravian Night, Farrar, Straus & Giroux, ISBN 978-0-374-21255-1
- 2016 The Great Fall, Seagull Books, ISBN 978-0-857-42534-8
- 2022 The Fruit Thief: or, One-Way Journey into the Interior, Farrar, Straus & Giroux, ISBN 9780374906504
- 2022 Quiet Places: Collected Essays, Farrar, Straus & Giroux, ISBN 9780374125592
