= 2019 Nobel Prize in Literature =

- Peter Handke
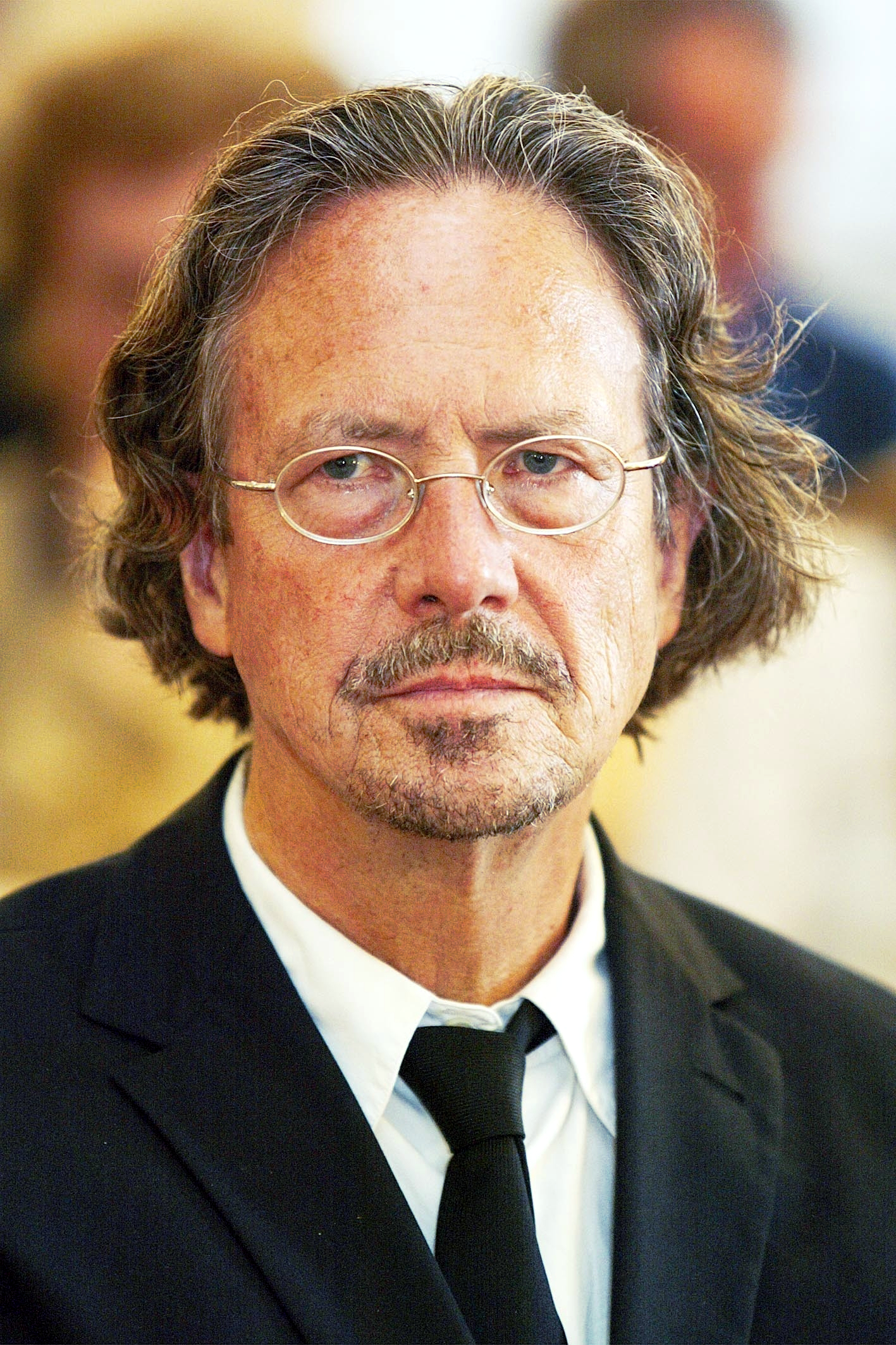
- "for an influential work that with linguistic ingenuity has explored the periphery and the specificity of human experience".
- Date: 10 October 2019 (announcement); 10 December 2019 (ceremony)
- Location: Stockholm, Sweden
- Presented by: Swedish Academy
- First award: 1901
- Website: Official website

The 2019 Nobel Prize in Literature was awarded to the Austrian writer Peter Handke (born 1942) "for an influential work that with linguistic ingenuity has explored the periphery and the specificity of human experience". The prize was announced by the Swedish Academy on 10 October 2019. Handke is the second Austrian Nobel laureate in Literature after Elfriede Jelinek, who won the prize in 2004.

== Laureate ==
Peter Handke is one of the most influential writers in Europe after the Second World War. His bibliography contains novels, essays, note books, dramatic works and screenplays. Already in the 1960s, Handke set his mark on the literary scene. He distanced himself from prevailing demands on community-oriented and political positions. His works are filled with a strong desire to discover and to bring his discoveries to life by finding new literary expressions for them. One of his books is Wunschloses Unglück ("A Sorrow Beyond Dreams", 1972), written after his mother's suicide. Among his important works are Publikumsbeschimpfung ("Offending the Audience", 1966), Die Angst des Tormanns beim Elfmeter ("The Goalie's Anxiety at the Penalty Kick", 1970), Die linkshändige Frau ("The Left-Handed Woman", 1976), and Die morawische Nacht ("The Moravian Nights", 2008).

== Candidates ==
According to the site Nicer Odds, who compile odds from various betting sites, favourites to be awarded the prize were the Canadian poet and essayist Anne Carson, French-Guadeloupe author Maryse Condé, Chinese Can Xue, Russian Lyudmila Ulitskaya, Japanese Haruki Murakami and Kenyan Ngugi Wa Thiong’o, closely followed by Olga Tokarczuk (who was awarded the postponed 2018 Nobel Prize in Literature), Canadian Margaret Atwood, American Marilynne Robinson and Hungarian Péter Nádas. The odds for Peter Handke were 20/1, behind perennial favourites such as Syrian poet Adonis, Albanian novelist Ismail Kadare and Romanian author Mircea Cărtărescu.

== Handke's reaction ==
Interviewed by Adam Smith, Chief Scientific Officer of Nobel Media, Handke described a sense of inexplicable freedom on hearing the news, the fact that he felt the need for another metamorphosis and discusses ways in which his writing brought him the most fulfilment. Asked what drives him to write productively and explore many genres, he responded saying:

"To dream... before I start to write, the dreaming about the book, about the voyage, about the expedition. And then, then sometimes at the end of the day when I've finished the day what I wrote comes back to me like a strange kind of sea. This is a very good feeling. Sometimes writing comes back like, like a vague [French: wave] of... vague of happiness. Sometimes, not always!

== International controversy ==
Countries that boycotted the 2019 Nobel Prize Award Ceremony in Stockholm, Sweden, in protest of Handke's award of the 2019 Nobel Prize in Literature.

The decision of the Nobel Committee to award Handke a Nobel Prize in literature in 2019 was denounced internationally by a variety of public and academic intellectuals, writers and journalists. Criticism focuses on the writer's view on the breakup of Yugoslavia and Yugoslav Wars, which has been described as pro-Serbian, his support of the late Slobodan Milošević, and Bosnian genocide denial. The high-profile figures who decried the decision of the Swedish Academy include individuals such as Deborah Lipstadt, Holocaust historian, who in her letter published in The New York Times wrote that the Nobel committee has awarded Handke a platform which "he does not deserve and the public does not need him to have", adding that such platform could convince some that his "false claims must have some legitimacy"; Miha Mazzini, who said that "some artists sold their human souls for ideologies (Hamsun and Nazism), some for hate (Céline and his rabid antisemitism), some for money and power (Kusturica) but the one that offended me the most was Handke with his naivety for the Milošević regime. ... I found him cruel and totally self-absorbed in his naivety"; Hari Kunzru, who said that Handke is "a troubling choice for a Nobel committee" and that he is "a fine writer, who combines great insight with shocking ethical blindness"; Salman Rushdie, who also criticized Handke's support for wartime Serbia in 1999; and Slavoj Žižek, Aleksandar Hemon, Bora Ćosić, and others.

The award was met with negative criticism in Kosovo, Bosnia and Herzegovina, Albania, Croatia, and Turkey, resulting in public statements of disapproval. Afghanistan, Albania, Bosnia and Herzegovina, Croatia, Kosovo, North Macedonia and Turkey boycotted the 2019 Nobel Prize Award Ceremony in Stockholm, Sweden in protest against Handke's award of the 2019 Nobel Prize in Literature. Expressing "deep regret", the decision was condemned by PEN America, PEN England and Wales, PEN Norway, PEN Bosnia and Herzegovina, and PEN Croatia. A group of demonstrators protested against the writer when he arrived to receive the prize. Mothers of Srebrenica protested against the award with messages to oppose the "spreading lies", while Women – Victims of War association from Republika Srpska organized a rally in Stockholm in support of Handke, saying that they support all people "who speak accurately and correctly and who think with their head".

PEN International issued the following statement from its President Jennifer Clement in response to the awarding of the 2019 Nobel Prize in Literature:

"The Nobel prize for literature does not only recognise the literary works and prowess of a writer, but also legitimises the entire body of a writer's work, including any works which comment on current affairs. As PEN members we are dedicated to embodying the principles of our Charter. We work to 'dispel all hatreds and to champion the ideal of one humanity living in peace and equality in one world.' The Academy's choice to recognise an author who has repeatedly questioned the legitimacy of well-documented war crimes is highly regrettable, particularly as it will, no doubt, be distressing to the many victims. At a time when leaders and public figures sow division and intolerance, and court populism, we must celebrate the works and voices of those among us who seek to do the opposite."

Support for Handke came from Jon Fosse, former recipient of the Ibsen Award, who welcomed the decision of the Swedish Academy to award Handke the Nobel Prize, saying that he was a worthy recipient and deserved it. The Nobel laureate Elfriede Jelinek said: "The great poet Handke has earned the Nobel prize 10 times." Norwegian novelist Karl Ove Knausgård reacted to the Nobel Prize for Handke: "I can’t think of a more obvious Nobel laureate than him." He added that the Austrian had written masterpieces in every decade of his career. Olga Tokarczuk, who was awarded the Nobel Prize for 2018 at the same ceremony, said she was proud to be with Handke, whom she greatly values, and tо the fact that both awards go to Central Europe. Award-winning filmmakers Wim Wenders and Emir Kusturica publicly congratulated Handke and traveled to Stockholm for the award ceremony to support him. Austrian president Alexander Van der Bellen called Handke's voice "unfussy and unique ... We have a lot to thank Peter Handke for. I hope he knows that."

Both the Swedish academy and Nobel Committee for Literature members defended their decision to award Handke the Nobel prize. Academy members Mats Malm and Eric M. Runesson wrote in the Swedish paper Dagens Nyheter that Handke had "definitely made provocative, inappropriate and unclear statements on political issues" but that they had "found nothing in what he has written that involves attacks on civil society or respect for the equal value of all people". The Swedish Academy quoted an article published in Libération and the Süddeutsche Zeitung in 2006, in which Handke said that "the Srebrenica massacre was the worst crime against humanity in Europe since World War II". Additionally, Handke stated the following in 2019 through the publishing house Suhrkamp Verlag: "In 2006 I wrote: 'Srebrenica massacre was the worst crime against humanity in Europe since World War II'. I would like to add: of course the genocide has caused infinite suffering, which I have never denied. A suffering that cannot be extinguished by anything. I regret my remarks, should they have conveyed something else." Nobel Committee's external member Henrik Petersen described Handke as "radically unpolitical" in his writings and that this support for Serbs had been misunderstood, while Rebecka Kärde said: "When we give the award to Handke, we argue that the task of literature is other than to confirm and reproduce what society’s central view believes is morally right" adding that the author "absolutely deserves a Nobel Prize."

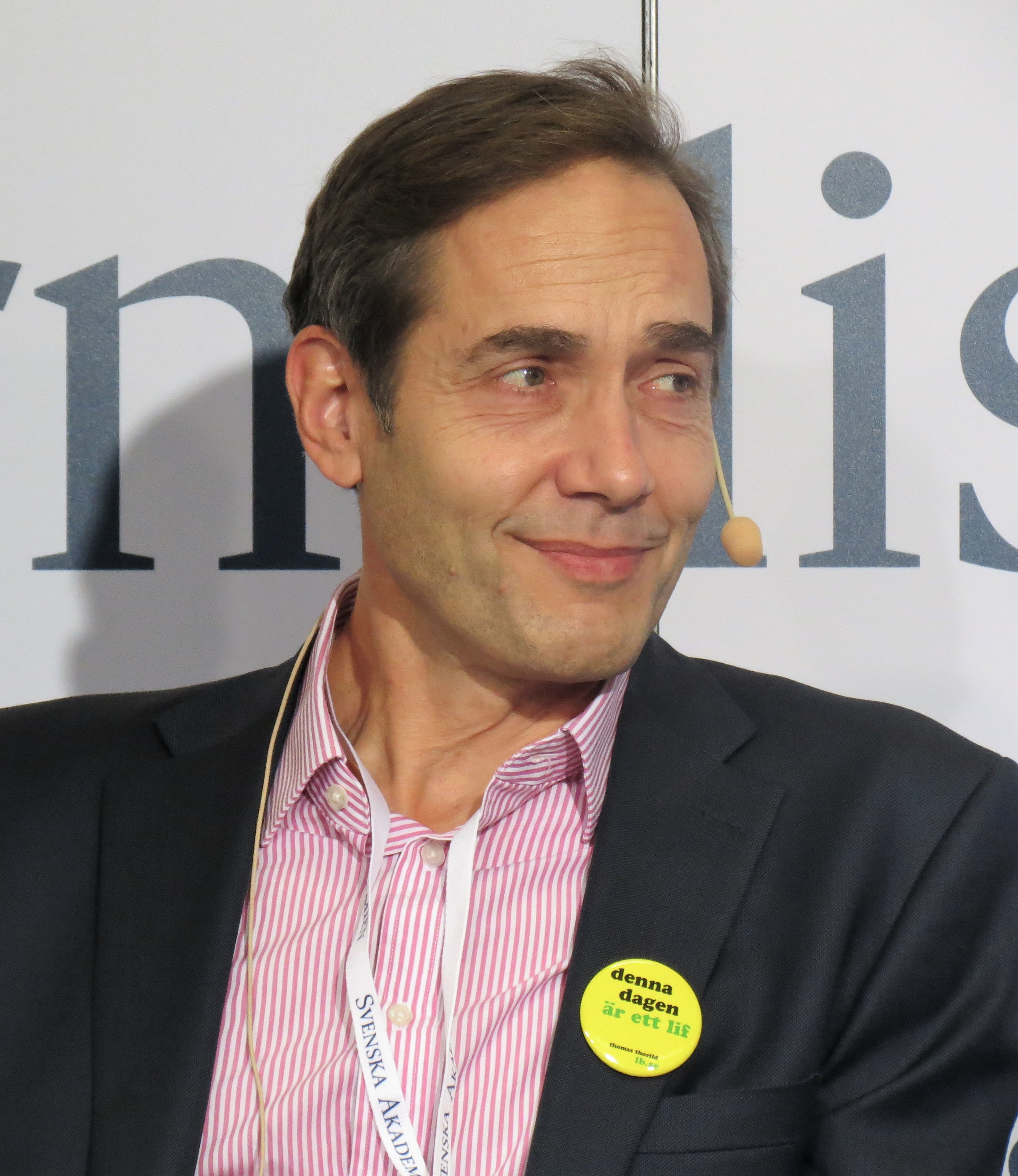
Mats Malm, permanent secretary of Swedish Academy since 2019.

The Intercept published a series of articles by war correspondent Peter Maass, who had covered the Bosnia War for The Washington Post. He criticized the Swedish Academy for awarding Handke the Nobel Prize, largely because of his attitude toward the Srebrenica massacre committed by the Bosnian Serbs. In another article by Intercept, Maass went to great length to call Handke an "exponent of white nationalism". Subsequently, in an interview conducted by Maass in December 2019, asking Handke whether the 1995 Srebrenica massacre (8,000 unarmed Muslim men and boys were killed by the Bosnian Serb Army of Republika Srpska) had happened, Handke responded: "I prefer toilet paper, an anonymous letter with toilet paper inside, to your empty and ignorant questions." Maass also contends that two Nobel prize jurors, Henrik Petersen and Eric Runesson, were adhering to conspiracy theories with regard to American involvement in the Balkan conflict and that they were "misinformed" about Handke's literary achievements.

Germany's Eugen Ruge protested against the scale of the criticism. In November 2019, around 120 authors, literary scholars, translators, and artists expressed their unease in an open letter. They felt that the criticism against Handke was no longer rational. The letter stated that the criticism of Handke "consists almost entirely of hatred, resentment, insinuations, distortions and the like. It has degenerated into anti-Handke propaganda."

On December 10, 2019, Christina Doctare participated in a demonstration at Norrmalmstorg in Stockholm wherein she returned her Nobel Peace Prize medal from 1988, which she was awarded jointly in her capacity as a member of the United Nations peacekeeping forces. "The academy has shown arrogance, ignorance and a lack of knowledge by giving Handke the award," she said. "Literature can never be above war crimes. Those who say so have blood on their hands."

== Award ceremony ==
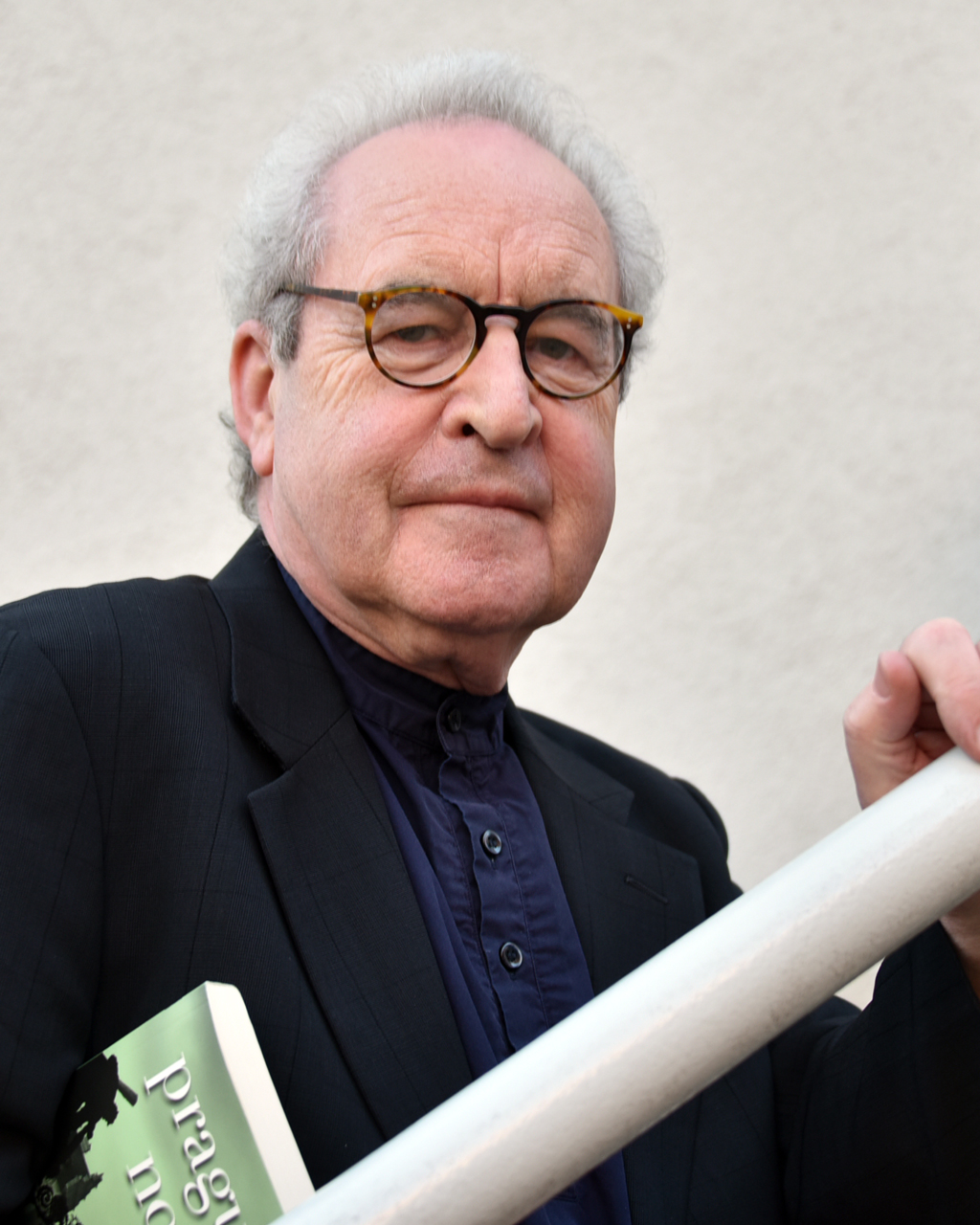
John Banville received a "prank call" hours before the Swedish Academy announced the official winner, informing him that he was among the newest Nobel laureates.

=== Prize presentation ===
The presentation speech delivered by Prof. Anders Olsson, Nobel Committee Chairman, on December 10, 2019, described Handke's style of writing, saying:

"Peter Handke's work is suffused with a strong spirit of discovery, a desire to write the world fresh. In his debut year, 1966, he attacked the literary world for its short- comings in describing reality, but over fifty years later, with about 80 works behind him – including films and about a score of plays – it is evident not only that he has realised his dream of a new prose, but also how his writing has become influential for several generations of writers in post-war Europe... [His] writing is often about returning to origins to remember the dead, but no strict iteration is possible.

"Handke's groundbreaking artistry with language emerges when his hyperactive sense for the particular compels investigation of his own medium. In his books we are often on foot, and his 'epic steps' appear with full effect in his story Slow Homecoming 1979. The story being told has almost dissolved in description, but the telling still lives on, guided by the narrators grounded feet and a gaze gifted with linguistic eyes. He has written: To be receptive is everything... [He] has said that the classics not only saved him but also preserved him. But he is also a deeply contemporary writer who must confront a paternal heritage perverted by the Nazis' occupation of Austria in the war. He represents a Slovenian maternal lineage, which motivates his anti-nationalistic myth of his origin.

=== Banquet speech ===
At the Nobel Banquet held at the Blue Hall, Stockholm City Hall's main hall, Handke delivered the following short speech:

"This is the first 'toast' in my life. In my old English dictionary 'to toast' means: 'to greet, in distance a beautiful lady'. This is the second time in my life, I address myself to a King and a Queen. The other time I found myself confronted to – Saint Louis, King of France, and his beloved wife, Margareta de Navarra. But this was in the twelfth century and it was a dream... Thank you all for your presence. My wish, my greetings: they go to the WILD GEESE in Nils Holgerssons underbara resa genom Sverige and the wish is: that the geese should in the future, beyond Sweden, also overfly every landscape not only in Europe and so transform even the smallest country into a world wide one! Selma Lagerlöf's wild geese forever... Strawberry Fields for ever. Wild Strawberries for ever."

== Other Nobel-related events ==
=== Banville's "Prank Call" ===
A man impersonating Malm rang the novelist John Banville on the day that the Swedish Academy intended to announce the recipients of the 2019 and 2018 Nobel Prizes in Literature. The man purporting to be Malm told Banville he had won and even read out the customary citation and asked if he would prefer to be designated the 2018 or 2019 laureate. Banville was attending a physiotherapy appointment at the time and was lying face down on a couch when the call came. He informed his daughter; she called her father back while watching the live announcement at midday to tell him his name had not been mentioned. After the announcement, a voicemail to Banville (again from the man posing as Malm) claimed the Swedish Academy had withdrawn his prize due a disagreement. Banville felt sorry for the man purporting to be Malm: "He certainly sounded upset, he was a very good actor". But he later compared the voice of the speaker to that of the real Malm, at which point he realised that neither man sounded alike. However, despite this, when Banville rang the number back he found himself in contact with the offices of the Swedish Academy.

== Nobel Committee ==
The Swedish Academy's Nobel Committee for the 2019 and 2020 Nobel Prize in Literature were the following members:

Committee Members
Seat No.	Picture	Name	Elected	Position	Profession
12		Per Wästberg (b. 1933)	1997	committee chair	novelist, journalist, poet, essayist
11		Mats Malm (b. 1964)	2018	associate member permanent secretary	translator, literary historian, editor
14		Kristina Lugn (1948–2020)	2006	member	poet, dramatist, writer
8		Jesper Svenbro (b. 1944)	2006	member	poet, classical philologist
4		Anders Olsson (b. 1949)	2008	member	literary critic, literary historian
External Members
		Kristoffer Leandoer (b. 1962)	2019	member	author, literary critic, translator
		Gun-Britt Sundström (b. 1945)	2019	member	author, literary critic, translator
		Rebecka Kärde (b. 1991)	2019	member	literary critic, translator
		Mikaela Blomqvist (b. 1987)	2019	member	literary critic, theatre critic
		Henrik Petersen (b. 1973)	2019	member	translator, literary critic, publisher
