= Once Again for Thucydides =

1990 book by Peter Handke

- Author: Peter Handke
- Original title: Noch einmal für Thukydides
- Translator: Tess Lewis
- Language: German
- Genre: travel literature
- Publisher: Residenz Verlag
- Publication date: 1990
- Publication place: Austria
- English publication date: 1998
- Pages: 38
- ISBN: 978-3-7017-0666-2

Once Again for Thucydides (German: Noch einmal für Thukydides) is a 1990 book of travel literature by the Austrian writer Peter Handke. It describes impressions from different places in the world in 17 short vignettes.

== Reception ==
Liam Callanan of The New York Times says the book changes the more closely it is read, because what first seems simple begins to appear more complex. He says it primarily is a poetic work and that Handke's occasional questioning of his role as an observer "rescues the book from fussy preciosity". Publishers Weekly says it is a book for niche readers and calls the texts simple and elegant in how they describe perceptions in "precise, carefully honed language that eschews metaphor". The critic compares the book to Handke's novel My Year in the No-Man's-Bay (1994), writing that both works avoid conventional definitions of fiction and are written from an elusive character's perspective. Kirkus Reviews says Once Again for Thucydides is pleasing and the way it shows Handke from a different, less austere side is refreshing.

== See also ==
- Thucydides
