= Silvia Glogner =

German actress (1940–2011)

Silvia Glogner (19 November 1940 – 7 September 2011) was a German actress.

== Biography ==
Glogner was born in Berlin. In 1956, she attended the Fritz-Kirchhot-Schule (also known as "Der Kreis"), one of the oldest drama schools in Berlin, where she studied with Paul Günther and received ballet training. She had her first engagement at the age of 16 at the Staatstheater Braunschweig. This was followed by engagements at the Komödie Basel, the city theaters of Karlsruhe, Augsburg, Cologne, Dortmund and Lübeck.

In 1976, she was brought to the Linz State Theatre by theater director Alfred Stögmüller. After working there for eleven years, she had a two and a half year long engagement in St. Gallen, after which she came back to Linz.

She died in Linz on the night of September 6-7, at the age of 70, as a result of a breast cancer, that was diagnosed in 2006.

== Selected roles ==
Throughout her career, she played hundreds of roles such as:

- "Gretchen" in Goethe's Faust
- "Mutter Wolffen" in Biberpelz by Gerhart Hauptmann
- "Mutter Courage" in Mother Courage and Her Children by Bertolt Brecht
- "Maria Stuart" in Mary Stuart by Friedrich Schiller
- "Atossa" in The Persians
- "Grollfeuer" in Volksvernichtung oder mein Leben ist sinnlos by Werner Schwab
- "Frau Zittel" in Heldenplatz by Thomas Bernhard

== Awards ==
- 2004: Kulturmedaille of the state of Upper Austria
- 2008: Ehrenzeichen of the state of Upper Austria
- September 4, 2011: The honorary title of Kammerschauspieler
- 2012: The Glognerweg, a street in Pichling in south-east Linz was named after her.
