= Franz Nabl Prize =

Austrian literature award

The Franz Nabl Prize is an biennial Austrian literature award. The prize was first awarded in 1975 by the city of Graz. The prize money is €14,500 (since 2019: €15,000). It is awarded as part of a jury meeting in cooperation with the Franz Nabl Institute for Literary Research at the Karl Franzens University of Graz.

== Recipients ==
- 1975 Elias Canetti
- 1977 Manès Sperber
- 1979 Ilse Aichinger
- 1981 Hermann Lenz
- 1983 Christa Wolf
- 1985 Peter Handke (Prize passed on to Michael Donhauser and Walter Grond)
- 1987 Wolfgang Koeppen
- 1989 H.C. Artmann
- 1991 Wilhelm Muster
- 1993 Martin Walser
- 1995 Christoph Ransmayr
- 1997 Herta Müller
- 1999 Barbara Frischmuth
- 2001 Urs Widmer
- 2003 Norbert Gstrein
- 2005 Josef Winkler
- 2007 Terézia Mora
- 2009 Alfred Kolleritsch
- 2011 Angela Krauß
- 2013 Florjan Lipuš
- 2015 Marlene Streeruwitz
- 2017 Dževad Karahasan
- 2019 Olga Flor
- 2021 Kathrin Röggla
- 2023 Clemens Johann Setz
- 2025 Fiston Mwanza Mujila
