= A Moment of True Feeling =

1975 novel by Peter Handke

- Author: Peter Handke
- Original title: Die Stunde der wahren Empfindung
- Translator: Ralph Manheim
- Language: German
- Publisher: Suhrkamp Verlag
- Publication date: 17 March 1975
- Publication place: Germany
- English publication date: 1977
- Pages: 167
- ISBN: 978-3-518-03029-5

A Moment of True Feeling (German: Die Stunde der wahren Empfindung) is a 1975 novel by the Austrian writer Peter Handke.

== Plot ==
Gregor Keuschnig works for the Embassy of Austria in Paris. One day he wakes up from a dream where he murdered a woman. From this moment his life seems pointless and the world around him distant. He goes through his daily routine and interacts with his colleagues, his mistress and his family, but feels lost and out of balance. He observes everything around him in search for a sensation that feels genuine.

== Reception ==
Kirkus Reviews wrote: "There are indeed moments of true feeling and moments of fine, precise, ironic writing here, but this ultimately seems a slim exercise, with personal commitment (a quality so evident in Handke's memoir, A Sorrow Beyond Dreams) painstakingly filtered through a familiar experimental literary convention." Stanley Kauffmann wrote in the Saturday Review: "What Handke is moving toward, I think, moving toward stunningly and courageously, is the novel as poem." Kauffmann distinguished this from "a poetic novel", which he described Handke's The Goalie's Anxiety at the Penalty Kick as, and argued that A Moment of True Feeling is closer to being a long prose poem.

== Adaptation ==
The novel was the basis for the 1988 French film Foreign City directed by Didier Goldschmidt.
