= The Ballad of the Last Guest =

2023 novel by Peter Handke

- Author: Peter Handke
- Original title: Die Ballade des letzten Gastes
- Translator: Krishna Winston
- Language: German
- Publisher: Suhrkamp Verlag
- Publication date: 29 October 2023
- Publication place: Germany
- English publication date: 2 December 2025
- Pages: 185
- ISBN: 978-3-518-43154-2

The Ballad of the Last Guest (German: Die Ballade des letzten Gastes) is a novel by the Austrian writer Peter Handke, published in 2023 by Suhrkamp Verlag.

== Plot ==
It is about a man who due to his younger brother's death makes a rare visit to his place of origin, which has changed from countryside to urban sprawl, and his family, which both is similar and changed, making him observe the surroundings and reminisce as he walks around the area. Gregor, the protagonist, is a recurring character in Handke's works who first appeared in his debut novel Die Hornissen in 1966.

== Reception ==
Florian Eichel of Die Zeit wrote that "the uncanny is reflected in Handke's notorious habit of speaking less to the reader than to himself" and that "Handke does not write like a poet, but like a brilliant editor" who incorporates comments like "[sic]" and criticism of his own repetitions. Eichel related the novel's theme of an alien guest to his own home to Handke's status as "the last of the great old German-language writers", following the deaths of Hans Magnus Enzensberger and Martin Walser.
