= Slow Homecoming =

1979–1981 tetralogy by Peter Handke

- The Long Way Around; The Lesson of Mont Sainte-Victoire; Child Story; Walk about the Villages
- Author: Peter Handke
- Country: Germany
- Language: German
- Publisher: Suhrkamp Verlag
- Published: 1979–1981

Slow Homecoming (German: Langsame Heimkehr) is a tetralogy by the Austrian writer Peter Handke, consisting in three novellas and one dramatic poem, published in 1979–1981.

== Plot ==
The Long Way Around (German: Langsame Heimkehr) is about a European scientist who relocates from Alaska to California, which disrupts his sense of space. It was published in 1979.

The Lesson of Mont Sainte-Victoire (German: Die Lehre der Sainte-Victoire) is about a trip to Paul Cézanne's Provence in search of renewed vitality. It was published in 1980.

Child Story (German: Kindergeschichte) is about a father who feels isolated but loves his young daughter. It was published in 1981.

Walk about the Villages (German: Über die Dörfer) is about the writer Gregor's return to his home village, where he ends up in conflict with his construction worker brother and shopkeeper sister over their parents' house and land. It is subtitled A Dramatic Poem, was published in 1981, and premiered as a play at the 1982 Salzburg Festival, where it was directed by Wim Wenders.

== Reception ==
The four works have been published both separately and in one volume in German and several other languages. In English translation, the novellas were published in one volume titled Slow Homecoming in 1981, and Walk about the Villages was published separately in 1996.

The tetralogy has been named as a turning point in Handke's writing, when he became increasingly subjective and his expression became more solemn, which led to some negative reactions when the stories first were published. Cecile Cazort Zorach of Monatshefte called The Long Way Around a "difficult and irritating book", more complex than Handke's earlier portrayal of the United States in Short Letter, Long Farewell (1972). Cazort Zorach wrote that it has traits of Bildungsroman along with "brief excursions into surrealistic metamorphoses, grotesque humor, veiled literary allusions, ponderous (but also parodistic) Heideggerian prose, and, finally, a shift from third-person narration to an 'ich'," the latter revealing that the book is as much about its narrator as its characters. Publishers Weekly wrote that Slow Homecoming is powerful in its reflections but suffers from its lack of storytelling and characterisation.
