= Grazer Gruppe =

The Grazer Gruppe is an Austrian writers group centred on Graz, with notable writers among its ranks such as Peter Handke and Elfriede Jelinek and Barbara Frischmuth.
