= A Journey to the Rivers =

1996 book by Peter Handke

A Journey to the Rivers: Justice for Serbia
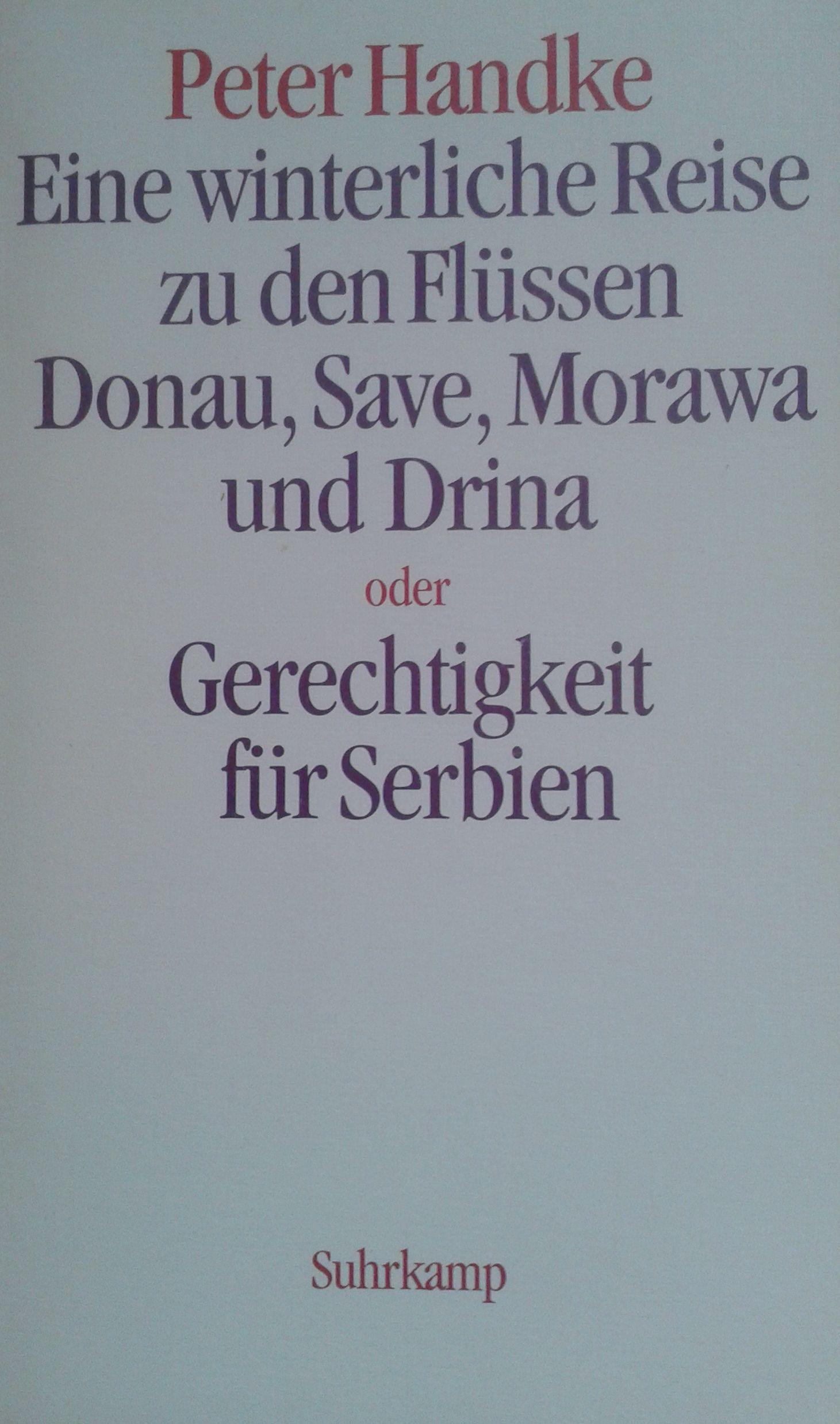
- Author: Peter Handke
- Original title: Eine winterliche Reise zu den Flüssen Donau, Save, Morawa und Drina, oder Gerechtigkeit für Serbien
- Translator: Scott Abbott
- Language: German
- Genre: travel literature
- Publisher: Suhrkamp Verlag
- Publication date: 1996
- Publication place: Germany
- English publication date: 1997
- Pages: 134
- ISBN: 978-3-518-40790-5

A Journey to the Rivers: Justice for Serbia (German: Eine winterliche Reise zu den Flüssen Donau, Save, Morawa und Drina, oder Gerechtigkeit für Serbien) is a 1996 book by the Austrian writer Peter Handke. It is a travelogue about Serbia with political and cultural commentary, written in the context of the Yugoslav Wars. Handke gives a positive assessment of Serbia and attacks the media reporting about the wars, which made the book the centre of heated discussion.

== Summary ==
A Journey to the Rivers: Justice for Serbia collects Peter Handke's travel writings originally published as a series of articles in the Sunday edition of Süddeutsche Zeitung. It is based on a journey through Bosnia and Serbia that Handke made in late 1995 together with two Serbian friends. Handke thought Serbia had been treated unfairly in the media during the Yugoslav Wars and set out to give a countering picture of the country. Rejecting the media picture of the Serbs as aggressors and the Croats as victims, Handke blames the Croats for having started the war and Germany for having worsened the situation by prematurely recognizing Croatia as an independent country, which turned a large Serbian minority into a second-class ethnic group.

== Reception ==
The book became highly controversial in Germany and Europe in general, resulting in heated polemics upon the publication. Discussions about the relationship between Handke's pro-Serbian positions and his writings led to comparisons to Martin Heidegger's Nazi involvement. Florian Grosser says Journey to the Rivers avoids "the violent ethnic conflicts on the Balkan peninsula to the point of distorting historical facts", citing the 1995 Srebrenica massacre as the most flagrant example of this. He says the book portrays Serbia as Handke's "Phantasieheimat, a last bastion that defends a 'buoyant' (heiter), 'original' (ursprünglich) and 'traditional' (volkstümlich) way of life against the hegemonial reach of a disenchanted West".

The New York Times's Lawrence Weschler called it "an appalling piece of work", writing that Handke "likes to float misgivings, raise doubts, posit questions with regard to specific factual details", and "engages in puerile ad hominem attacks on the newspapers, journalists and writers whose job it is to provide the details". Publishers Weekly wrote that the book's self-conscious style and "hairsplitting analysis of European journalism, films and TV news coverage" made it less likely to cause the same uproar in the United States as it had in Europe. Kirkus Reviews wrote that Handke "attempts to apply his aesthetic philosophy to the real world and fails miserably".
