= The Goalkeeper's Fear of the Penalty =

1972 film

- Home video cover art
- Directed by: Wim Wenders
- Written by: Peter Handke; Wim Wenders
- Based on: The Goalie's Anxiety at the Penalty Kick by Peter Handke
- Produced by: Peter Genée; Thomas Schamoni
- Starring: Arthur Brauss; Erika Pluhar; Kai Fischer
- Cinematography: Robby Müller
- Edited by: Peter Przygodda
- Music by: Jürgen Knieper
- Distributed by: Bauer International (U.S.)
- Release date: 19 February 1972
- Running time: 101 minutes
- Countries: West Germany; Austria
- Language: German
- Budget: DM 620,000 (estimated)

The Goalkeeper's Fear of the Penalty (German: Die Angst des Tormanns beim Elfmeter) is a 1972 German-language detective film, directed by Wim Wenders. It is also known as The Goalie's Anxiety at the Penalty Kick. It was adapted from the short story with the same title by Peter Handke and won the Fipresci Prize at the Venice Film Festival in 1972.

In the film, a goalkeeper has a one-night stand with a woman and proceeds to kill her. He returns to his home town and hides in plain sight, uncertain whether the police is searching for him.

== Plot ==
A goalkeeper is sent off during a game for dissent. He spends the night with a cinema cashier, whom he afterwards kills. Although a type of detective film, it is more slow moving and contemplative than other films of the genre. It explores the monotony of the murderer's existence and, like many of Wenders' films, the overwhelming cultural influence of the United States in post-war West Germany.

=== Origin of the title ===
Late in the film, the goalkeeper and a traveling salesman attend a football game, and witness a penalty kick. The goalkeeper describes what it is like to face a penalty: should he dive to one side, and if he does will the kicker aim for the other? It is a psychological confrontation in which each tries to outfox the other.

In parallel with this, the goalkeeper, rather than go on the run, has returned to his home town and is living in plain sight. He doesn't know if the police are looking for him in particular, and the police are not necessarily looking for someone who isn't trying to hide.

=== Restoration ===
In 2012, the Wim Wenders Foundation financed the restoration of the film, which had been unavailable for decades.

== See also ==
- The Beautiful Days of Aranjuez
- Wings of Desire
