= Crossing the Sierra de Gredos =

2002 novel by Peter Handke

- Cover of the first edition
- Author: Peter Handke
- Original title: Der Bildverlust oder Durch die Sierra de Gredos
- Translator: Krishna Winston
- Language: German
- Publisher: Suhrkamp Verlag
- Publication date: 15 January 2002
- Publication place: Germany
- English publication date: 10 July 2007
- Pages: 760
- ISBN: 978-3-518-41310-4

Crossing the Sierra de Gredos (German: Der Bildverlust oder Durch die Sierra de Gredos) is a 2002 novel by the Austrian writer Peter Handke. It tells the story of a successful female banker who makes a journey through the Sierra de Gredos mountain range in Spain to meet a famous author in La Mancha who will write her biography. On the way she makes stops where she is confronted with the unheroic and commercialised world she wishes to escape. Handke describes the book as "a medieval novel about modern times."

== Publication ==
The book was published through Suhrkamp Verlag on 15 January 2002. An English translation by Krishna Winston was published by Farrar, Straus and Giroux on 17 July 2007.

== Reception ==
In the San Francisco Chronicle, Christopher Byrd wrote: "Handke's aesthetic agenda in Crossing the Sierra de Gredos is unmistakable. It's executed by a form of philosophically inspired writing that leans less on existentialism, the go-to mode for many cerebral writers in the past, than on deconstruction. By zeroing in on the many things adventure stories leave out - for instance, the quality of the soil that the hero treads underfoot - Handke subverts the genre, so as to unmask our complacency with cliches." Kirkus Reviews wrote: "This newest fiction shows [Handke] at his best and worst. ... The result is a work that embraces a disciplined attempt to acknowledge and celebrate the matter of everyday life (before it vanishes forever?), and a species of literate wool-gathering which seems to confirm Handke’s frequently reiterated assertion that all that exists is grist for the artist’s mill. ... Nobody writing today surpasses Peter Handke at trying to make sense of it all." Guy Vanderhaeghe of The Washington Post called the book "a beautifully hallucinatory, eerily compelling novel".
