= Nonsense and Happiness =

1974 book by Peter Handke

- Author: Peter Handke
- Original title: Als das Wünschen noch geholfen hat
- Translator: Michael Roloff
- Language: German
- Publisher: Suhrkamp Verlag
- Publication date: 6 January 1974
- Publication place: West Germany
- English publication date: 1976
- Pages: 128
- ISBN: 978-3-518-36708-7

Nonsense and Happiness (German: Als das Wünschen noch geholfen hat, lit. 'When Wishing Still Helped') is a 1974 book by the Austrian writer Peter Handke. It is a collection of poems, reviews and other previously published texts, including Handke's acceptance speech for the 1973 Georg Büchner Prize. Michael Wood of The New York Review of Books described it as "a book of rambling meditative poems". The German title appears in the opening of several tales from the Brothers Grimm, notably "The Frog Prince".
