= Walk about the Villages =

1981 play by Peter Handke

- Original title: Über die Dörfer
- Original language: German
- Written by: Peter Handke
- Characters: Nova; Gregor; Hans; Sophie

Premiere
- Date: 8 August 1982
- Place: Salzburg Festival

Walk about the Villages: A Dramatic Poem (German: Über die Dörfer. Dramatisches Gedicht) is a 1981 play by the Austrian writer Peter Handke. It is about a writer who returns to his home village where he becomes involved in a dispute with his brother and sister over their parents' house. It is the final part of Handke's Slow Homecoming tetralogy.

Walk about the Villages was published as a book in 1981. It premiered on stage at the 1982 Salzburg Festival, where it was performed on 8, 15 and 22 August. It was directed by Wim Wenders and starred Libgart Schwarz as Nova, Martin Schwab as Gregor, Rüdiger Vogler as Hans and Elisabeth Schwarz as Sophie.

Handke quoted at length from Walk about the Villages in his Nobel lecture after he was awarded the 2019 Nobel Prize in Literature. Reflecting in 2026 on Handke, his political views and his Nobel Prize, Alexander Schimmelbusch of the Frankfurter Allgemeine Zeitung wrote that Walk about the Villages marked "the end point of his golden decade from about 1970 to 1981", when Handke produced a series of works for which he deserved the Nobel Prize. Schimmelbusch described Walk about the Villages as "in places lyrical, almost hypnotic prose, evocative like a children's church service, but quite open in the evocation".

The play was the basis for the opera Über die Dörfer by the composer Walter Zimmermann with Handke as librettist. The opera was commissioned by the Musiktheater Nürnberg where it premiered on 23 June 1988.
