= The Innerworld of the Outerworld of the Innerworld =

1969 poetry collection by Peter Handke

- Author: Peter Handke
- Original title: Die Innenwelt der Außenwelt der Innenwelt
- Translator: Michael Roloff
- Language: German
- Publisher: Suhrkamp Verlag
- Publication date: 10 March 1969
- Publication place: West Germany
- English publication date: 1 December 1974
- Pages: 149

The Innerworld of the Outerworld of the Innerworld (German: Die Innenwelt der Außenwelt der Innenwelt) is the first poetry collection by the Austrian writer Peter Handke, published by Suhrkamp Verlag in 1969. A selection from the book was published in English translation by Michael Roloff in 1974. Kirkus Reviews described the poems as based almost exclusively on the ability of philosophical language to delight readers, resulting in "litanies of the distinctions and ambiguities in form" or "just word games".
