= Eva Heller =

German writer and social scientist (1948–2008)

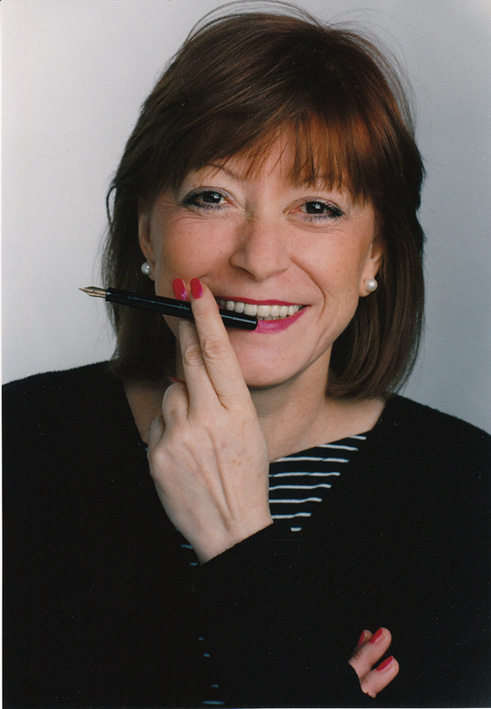
- Born: April 8, 1948; Esslingen am Neckar, Allied-occupied Germany
- Died: January 31, 2008 (aged 59)
- Occupation: Writer

Eva Heller (8 April 1948 – 31 January 2008) was a German writer and social scientist. She was born in Esslingen am Neckar.

== Career ==
As a writer, she published in a wide range of genres, including novels, children's books and non-fiction works. Her work has been translated into English. Her novel With the Next Man Everything Will Be Different was translated by Krishna Winston and won the Schlegel-Tieck Prize.
