= To Duration =

1986 poem by Peter Handke

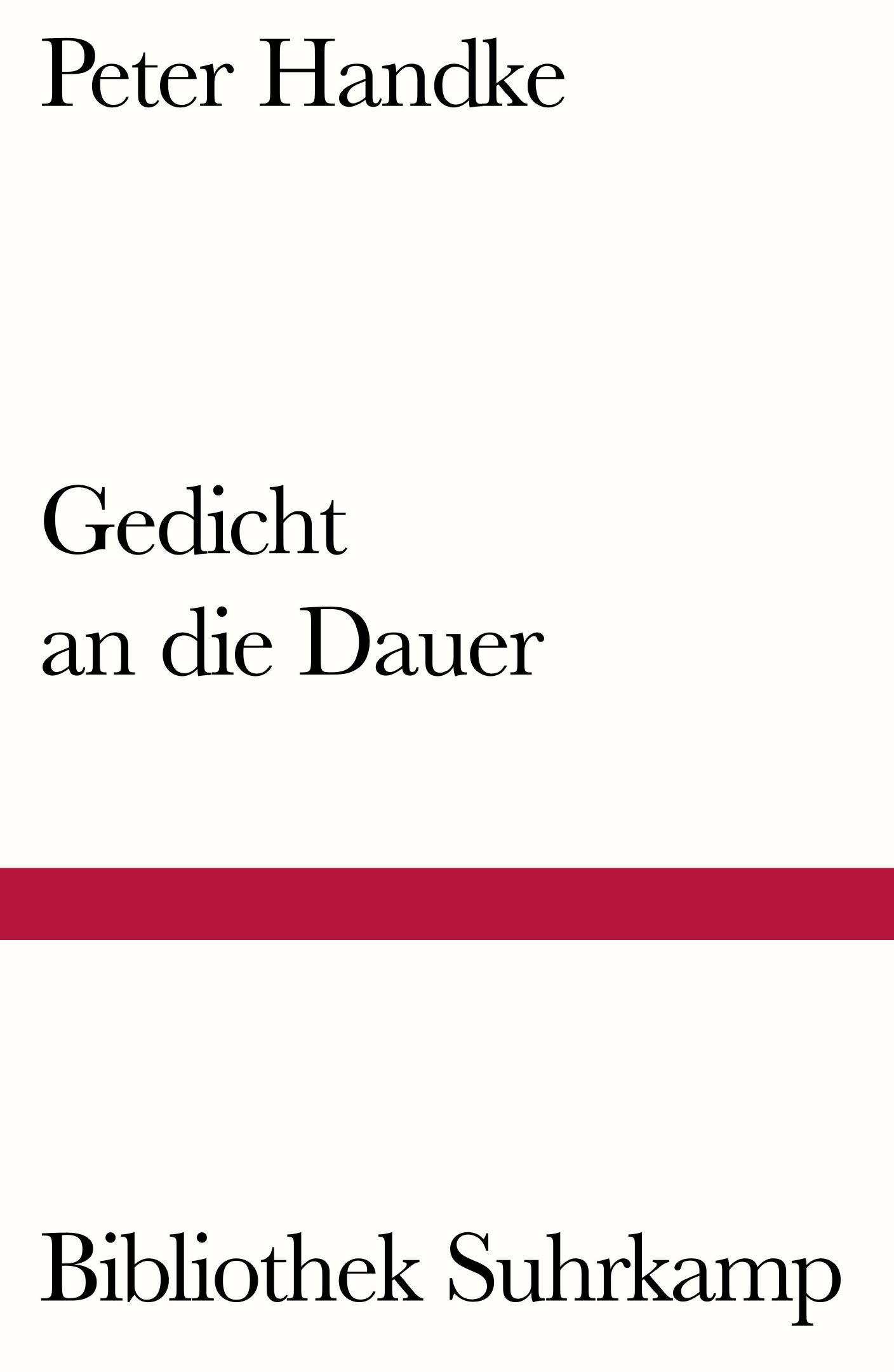
- Author: Peter Handke
- Original title: Gedicht an die Dauer
- Translator: Scott Abbott
- Language: German
- Publisher: Suhrkamp Verlag
- Publication date: 1986
- Publication place: West Germany
- English publication date: 2015
- Pages: 54
- ISBN: 3518019309

To Duration (German: Gedicht an die Dauer) is a long poem by the Austrian writer Peter Handke, published as a book by Suhrkamp Verlag in 1986. It is about duration in relation to time, material things, locations and personal origin, combined with memories from a sailing trip along the Turkish coast, the longing for a home, relationships and exploration of the self.

The poem is inspired by Johann Wolfgang von Goethe's writings about individuality and Henri Bergson's conception of duration in "Introduction to Metaphysics". It uses inner dialectic to engage in self-discovery through images of the past, their relation to the present, poetic intuition and self-awareness in the process of writing.

The Last Books published To Duration in English interpretation by Scott Abbott in 2015.

The poem is the central focus in Canto alla durata. Omaggio a Peter Handke, a 2017 documentary film about Handke directed by Didi Gnocchi.
