= Claus Peymann =

German theatre director and manager (1937–2025)

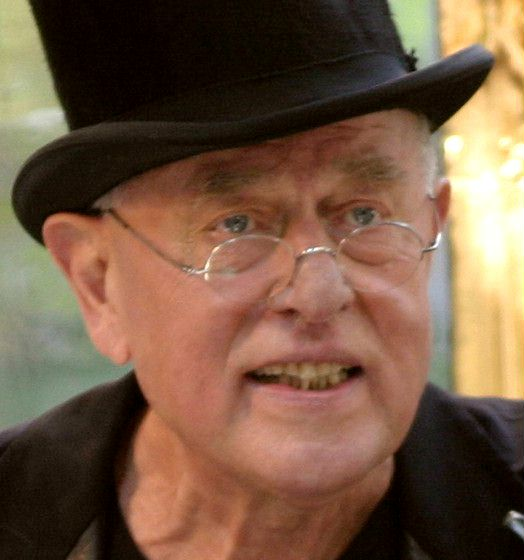
- Peymann, in 2011
- Born: Klaus Eberhard Peymann; 7 June 1937; Bremen, Gau Weser-Ems, Germany
- Died: 16 July 2025 (aged 88); Berlin, Germany
- Occupations: Theatre director; Theatre manager
- Organizations: Schauspiel Stuttgart; Schauspielhaus Bochum; Burgtheater; Berliner Ensemble
- Partner: Jutta Ferbers
- Awards: Nestroy Theatre Prize

Claus Peymann (born Klaus Eberhard Peymann, German: [ˈklaʊs ˈeːbɐʁhaʁt ˈpaɪ̯man]; 7 June 1937 – 16 July 2025) was a German theatre director and manager. He headed the Schauspiel Stuttgart from 1974, the Schauspielhaus Bochum from 1979, the Burgtheater in Vienna from 1986 to 1999, and the Berliner Ensemble from 1999 to 2017. In all positions, he focused on world premieres of plays and invited new directors, often causing controversy. He produced Handke's Publikumsbeschimpfung in 1966 and Bernhard's Heldenplatz in 1988, many more by these two authors, and also plays by Peter Turrini and Elfriede Jelinek. He collaborated with actors who followed him when he moved to a different post, such as Gert Voss and Traugott Buhre. Peymann was regarded as an already legendary figure in German theatre during his lifetime.

== Life and career ==
Peymann was born in Bremen on 7 June 1937, the son of the teacher Karl Peymann and his wife Käthe. After completing school in Hamburg with the Abitur in 1956, he studied German studies, literature and theatre sciences at the University of Hamburg, where he at times led a theatre studio of students.

=== Early work ===
Peymann began work in the 1966/67 season as an assistant to Otto Sander und Ulrich Wildgruber at the Stadttheater Heidelberg and was then Oberspielleiter at the Theater am Turm in Frankfurt until 1969. He directed there the world premieres of Handke's Publikumsbeschimpfung (Offending the Audience) in 1966, Kaspar and Das Mündel will Vormund sein and of Gerlind Reinshagen's Doppelkopf. He was one director of the late 1960s who wanted to create a new theatre, presenting a new better society to an audience of a criticised society, planting ideas of social criticism into classical plays such as Goethe's Torquato Tasso and Kleist's Der Prinz von Homburg.

With Peter Stein, he founded the new Schaubühne am Halleschen Ufer with the 1970/71 season. He directed his first world premiere of a play by Thomas Bernhard, Ein Fest für Boris (A Feast for Boris), at the Deutsches Schauspielhaus in Hamburg in 1970, beginning a collaboration with the author for life. He directed the world premiere of Handke's Der Ritt über den Bodensee in Berlin in 1971. Because of disagreements with Peter Stein, Peymann worked freelance from 1971 to 1974. He directed Bernhard's Der Ignorant und der Wahnsinnige (The Ignorant and the Madman), at the Salzburg Festival in 1972, with Bruno Ganz and Ulrich Wildgruber.

=== Stuttgart ===
Peymann became intendant at the Schauspiel Stuttgart in 1974, where his productions of classical plays such as Schiller's Die Räuber, Kleist's Käthchen von Heilbronn, and Goethe's Faust I, Faust II and Iphigenie auf Tauris were recognised. He there attracted an ensemble of actors who would follow him to Bochum and later Vienna, including Gert Voss, Kirsten Dene, Traugott Buhre and Branko Samarovski. He worked continuously also with dramaturges Hermann Beil, and Jutta Ferbers, his partner. In 1976 he staged Faust on a stage designed by Achim Freyer, with Martin Lüttge as Faust, a capitalist, and Samarovski as Mephisto, a jester. He made Dene as Iphigenie sit at a typewriter in 1977.

=== Bochum ===
In 1979 Peymann became Intendant at the Schauspielhaus Bochum, succeeding Peter Zadek. In 1980, Samarovski, as Tasso, was kept in a glass cage, and he staged Bernhard's Der Weltverbesserer with Bernhard Minetti and Edith Heerdegen as his mute partner. He staged in 1982 Kleist's Hermannsschlacht with Voss as Hermann, a Che Guevara lookalike who instigated the partisan fight against the Roman occupiers like a rascal's prank, as a reviewer from the Frankfurter Allgemeine Zeitung noted, who concluding that he reconciled student theatre and municipal theatre. In almost seven years in Bochum, Peymann developed the troupe into one of the leading theatres in German, according to critics.

=== Vienna Burgtheater ===
Peymann headed the Burgtheater in Vienna from 1986 to 1999, where he staged 252 productions, including 51 world premieres. In 1987 he staged Shakespeare's Richard III with Gert Voss as a pickpocket. His focus on new plays by Austrian authors, such as Bernhard's Heldenplatz in 1988, often caused scandal and arguments in the Vienna press. Besides Handke and Bernhard, he also offered new works by Peter Turrini and Elfriede Jelinek, whose Ein Sportstück was produced in 1998, directed by Einar Schleef. He also invited other different directors, including Ruth Berghaus, George Tabori, Giorgio Strehler, Peter Zadek, Hans Neuenfels and Bob Wilson. Actors favoured by the audience also included Ilse Ritter and Martin Schwab. He offered attractive tickets for students and young people.

=== Berliner Ensemble ===
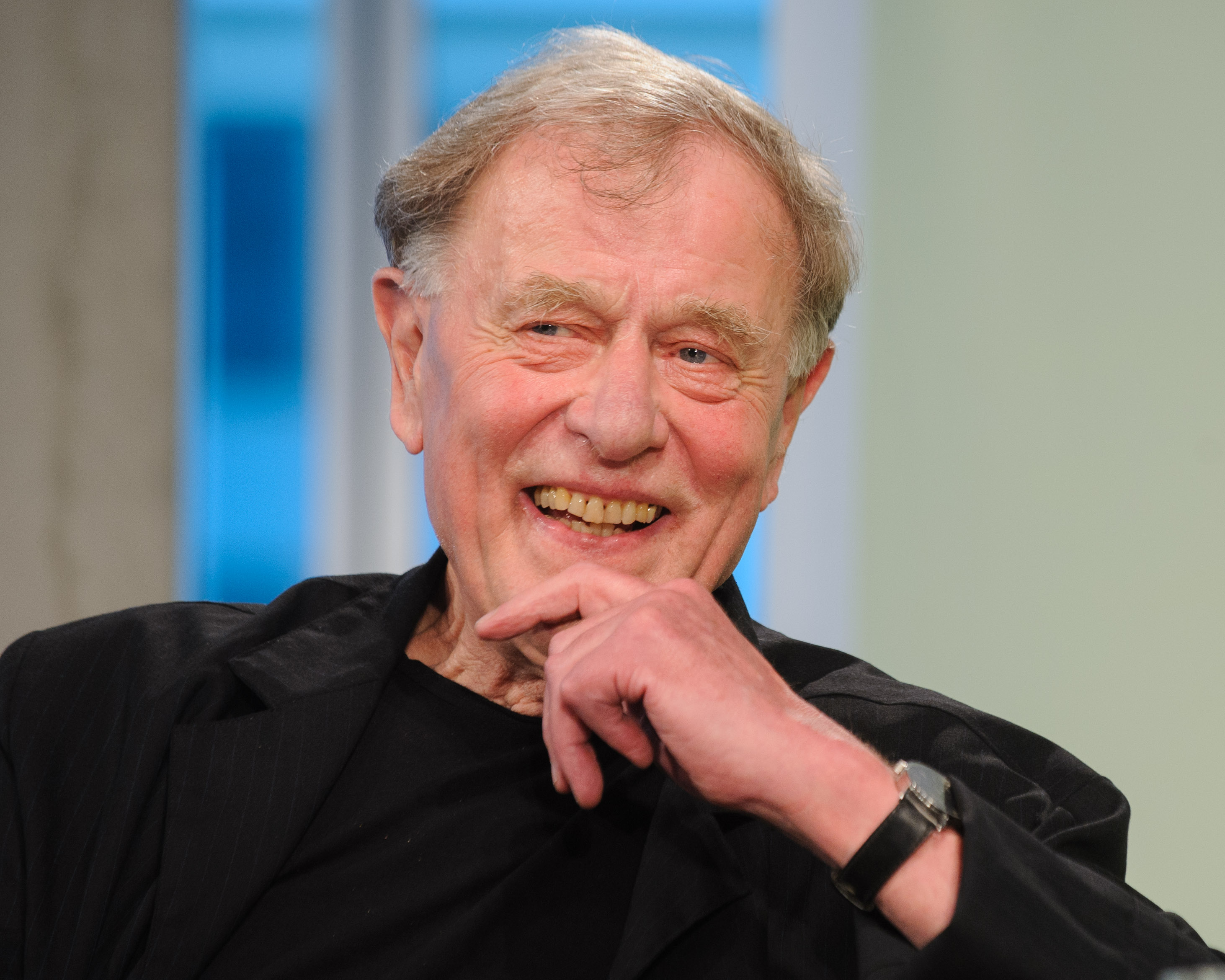
Peymann in 2013

Peymann was Intendant, artistic director and manager of the Berliner Ensemble from 1999. The ensemble was founded by Bertolt Brecht in 1949 and played mainly his works at the Theater am Schiffbauerdamm. Peymann continued the tradition, but also staged contemporary dramas such as Bernhard's works. The theatre was often full, and reviews predictably negative. He used the theatre as a place for political statement and resistance.

In 2002 Peymann was awarded the Nestroy Theatre Prize for his life achievements. Comments on the ceremony and their interpretation in the press caused him to return the award. He accepted it ten years later. Peymann concluded his term on 2 July 2017 with a long evening at the theatre, attended by artistic friends such as Nina Hagen, Katharina Thalbach, Georgette Dee, Angela Winkler and Herbert Grönemeyer.

=== Later years ===
Peymann worked as a freelance director when his health permitted, such as at the Stadttheater Ingolstadt and Bernhard's Minetti at the Residenztheater in Munich. His last production was Beckett's Warten auf Godot at the Theater in der Josefstadt in Vienna in 2023.

Peymann lived with his partner, Jutta Ferbers, in Berlin-Köpenick. He died at his home on 16 July 2025 following a long illness, aged 88.

== Awards ==
- 1995: Theaterpreis Berlin
- 2002: Nestroy Theatre Prize (returned)
- 2012: Lessing-Preis für Kritik
- 2012: Honorary membership of the Burgtheater
