= Barbara Frischmuth =

Austrian writer (1941–2025)

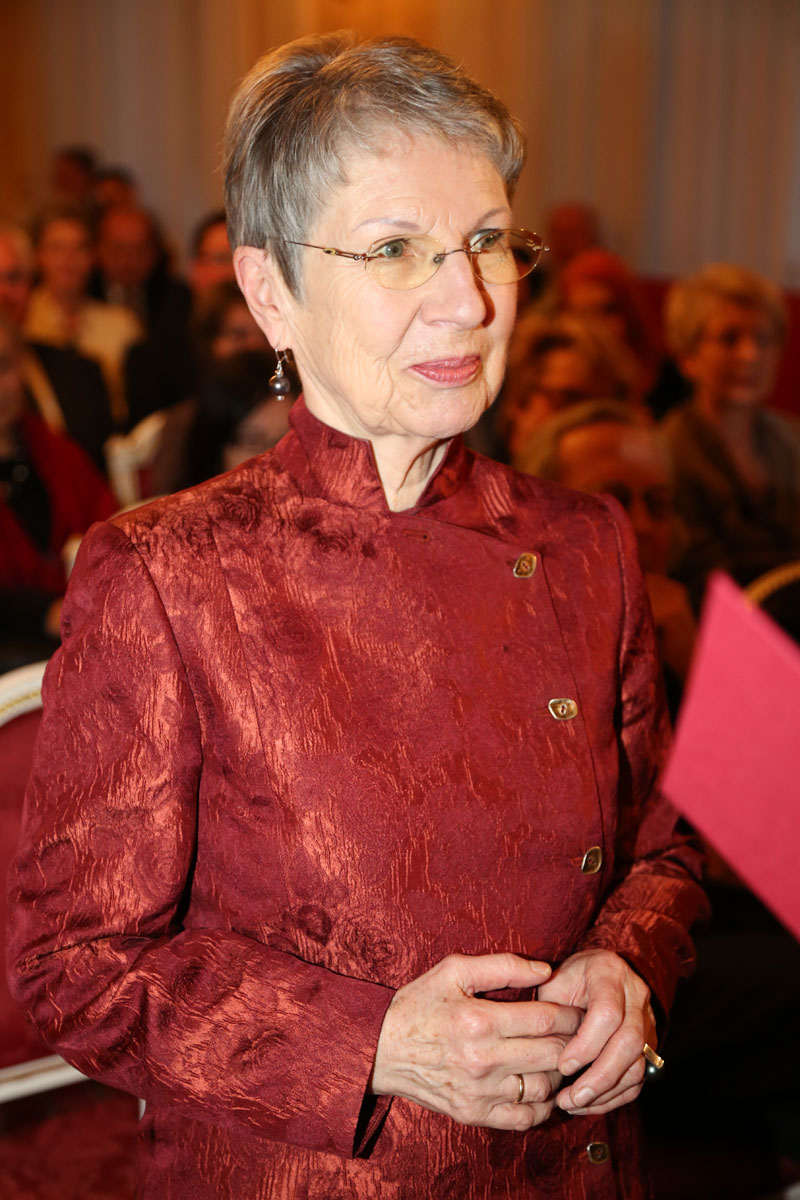
- Frischmuth in 2013
- Born: 5 July 1941; Altaussee, Reichsgau Steiermark, Nazi Germany (now Austria)
- Died: 30 March 2025 (aged 83); Altaussee, Styria, Austria
- Education: University of Graz
- Occupations: Novelist; translator
- Writing career
- Notable awards: Anton Wildgans Prize; Franz Nabl Prize; Austrian Decoration for Science and Art
- Website: barbarafrischmuth.at

Barbara Frischmuth (Austrian German: [ˈbarbara ˈfrɪʃmuːt]; 5 July 1941 – 30 March 2025) was an Austrian writer and translator. She travelled the world, open to other cultures, which influenced her works. Her first novel, Die Klosterschule, shows a student's experiences in a convent school, as well as a feminist attitude and criticism of authorities. She wrote two trilogies of novels in the 1970s and 1980s, as well as a series of "garden books" in the 2000s.

== Life and career ==
Frischmuth was born in Altaussee on 5 July 1941. Her mother ran a hotel after her father had died as a soldier in Russia. She became interested in the Orient after reading One Thousand and One Nights. She moved with her mother to Graz in 1956. She studied Turkish and English to be a translator, going to Erzurum in Anatolia in 1960 for a year to study Turkish on a scholarship. She invested the first money she earned as translator to buy Arno Schmidt's Zettels Traum.

Frischmuth held the first reading from her works in 1961. She published in the Graz literary magazine Manuskripte from 1962, while studying, and remained a friend of the magazine for life. She became a member of the Grazer Gruppe, a group of authors, the same year, meeting authors such as Wolfgang Bauer, Gunter Falk, Peter Handke, Klaus Hoffer and Alfred Kolleritsch.

She studied Hungarian in Graz, and then from 1963 for a year at the University of Debrecen, graduating as a licensed translator. Originally pursuing Turkology, Iranian studies and Islamic studies in Vienna from 1964, she turned to writing shortly afterwards. She travelled to Egypt, Morocco, and Iran, as well as to India, China and Japan. She was open to cultural differences which influenced her works. In addition to novels, she wrote non-fiction books, poetry volumes, audio plays, translations, and a libretto.

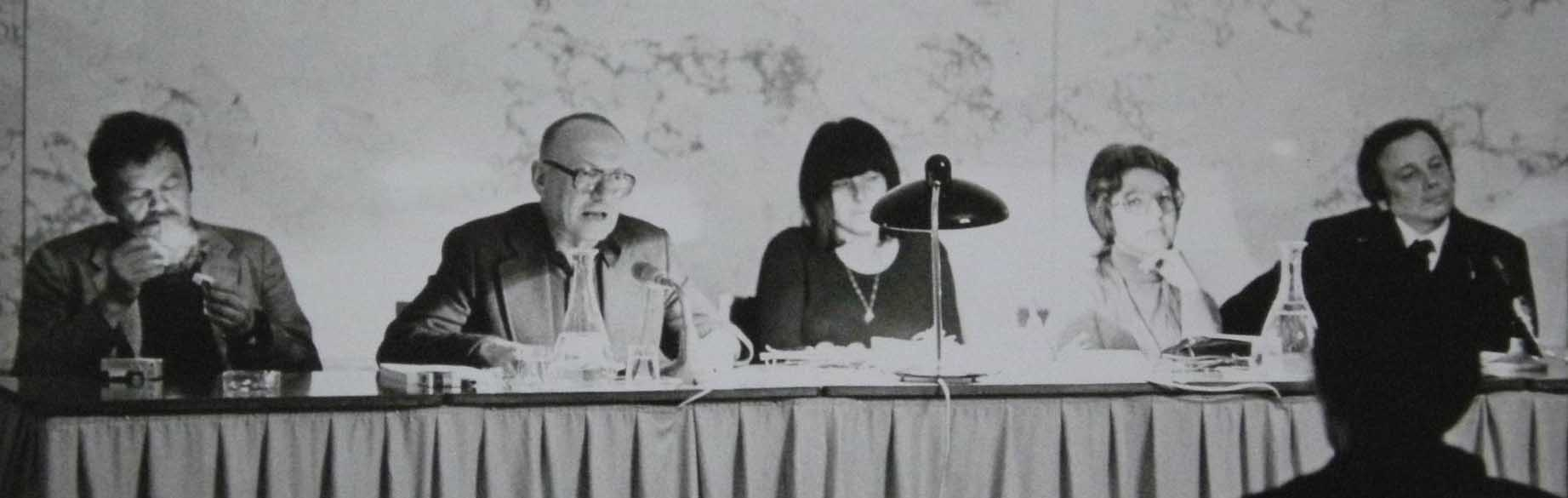
Frischmuth on a podium at the 1974 Buchwoche in Vienna Alfred Hrdlicka (from l.) Ernst Jandl, and Friederike Mayröcker

Before publishing her own works, she translated the diary of Anna Novac, written in a concentration camp. Her 1968 debut novel, Die Klosterschule (The Convent School) (1968), was a success. Its theme is the narrow atmosphere of a convent school, seen by a girl critical of an oppressive education. It also showed feminist aspects, which became a continued topic in her work. Criticism of authorities and openness for foreign cultures also remained themes. Twice in her life she wrote a trilogy of novels, the Sternwieser-Trilogie in the 1970s and the Demeter-Trilogie in the 1980s. She travelled for readings to England and North America, being writer in residence both at the Oberlin College in Ohio in 1976 and at the Washington University in St. Louis in 1987. She lectured poetry at LMU Munich in 1990, with her course titled "Traum der Literatur – Literatur des Traums", about dreams in poetry.

She was active in her hometown, for example as co-leader of the Literaturmuseum. In the 2000s she authored a set of garden books, in addition to other works. In her lecture "Natur und die Versuche, ihr mit Sprache beizukommen" (Nature and the attempts to come to terms with it through language), she argued that humans are just one of many species on Earth and should not presume to rule over others, a longstanding position that influenced many of her later works.

== Personal life and death ==
Frischmuth was married to Günther Grün, a sulky driver; they had a son born in 1973, Florian Anastasius Grün. She married Dirk Penner, a psychiatrist and neurologist, in 1988. She moved back to Altaussee in the 1990s.

Frischmuth died after a long illness in Altaussee, on 30 March 2025, at the age of 83.

== Books ==
- Die Klosterschule, 1968
- Das Verschwinden des Schattens in der Sonne, 1973
- Sternwieser-Trilogie (1976–1979)
  - Die Mystifikationen der Sophie Silber
  - Amy oder Die Metamorphose
  - Kai und die Liebe zu den Modellen*
- Demeter-Trilogie (1986–1990)
  - Herrin der Tiere
  - Über die Verhältnisse
  - Einander Kind
- Die Schrift des Freundes, 1998
- Fingerkraut und Feenhandschuh. Ein literarisches Gartentagebuch, 1999
- Die Entschlüsselung, 2003
- Der Sommer, in dem Anna verschwunden war, 2004
- Löwenmaul und Irisschwert, 2003
- Marder, Rose, Fink und Laus, 2007
- Vergiss Ägypten, 2008
- Woher wir kommen, 2012
- Der unwiderstehliche Garten, 2015
- Verschüttete Milch, 2019

== Awards ==
- 1972 Österreichischer Kinder- und Jugendbuchpreis
- 1973 Anton Wildgans Prize
- 1999 Franz Nabl Prize
- 2003 Josef Krainer Prize
- 2005 Ehrenpreis des österreichischen Buchhandels für Toleranz in Denken und Handeln
- 2013 Austrian Decoration for Science and Art
- 2019 Goldenes Ehrenzeichen für Verdienste um das Land Wien
- 2019 Ehrenring des Landes Steiermark
- 2024 Ehrenzeichen des Landes Steiermark für Wissenschaft, Forschung und Kunst
