= Conquest of the Useless =

2004 book by Werner Herzog

- Author: Werner Herzog
- Original title: Die Eroberung des Nutzlosen
- Translator: Krishna Winston
- Language: German
- Publisher: Carl Hanser Verlag
- Publication date: 2004
- Publication place: Germany
- English publication date: 2009
- Pages: 334
- ISBN: 9783446204577

Conquest of the Useless: Reflections from the Making of Fitzcarraldo (German: Die Eroberung des Nutzlosen) is a 2004 book by the German filmmaker Werner Herzog. It is Herzog's diaries from the troubled, three years long production of the 1982 film Fitzcarraldo.

Kirkus Reviews called the book a "valuable historical record and a strangely stylish, hypnotic literary work". Jonathan Levi of the Los Angeles Times wrote that it reveals Herzog "to be witty, compassionate, microscopically observant and -- your call -- either maniacally determined or admirably persevering".

The book was the basis for the composition Sweat of the Sun by David Fennessy. It premiered at the Munich Biennale in 2016 and was performed at the Theater Osnabrück in 2017. Presented as a work of music theatre, the 65 minutes long performance had solo singers dressed up as Herzog and Klaus Kinski, although it featured no opera plot. Der Opernfreund treated it as a concert piece and wrote it was reminiscent of works by Bernd Alois Zimmermann.
