= The Weight of the World (book) =

1977 book by Peter Handke

- Author: Peter Handke
- Original title: Das Gewicht der Welt
- Translator: Ralph Manheim
- Language: German
- Publisher: Residenz Verlag
- Publication date: 1977
- Publication place: Austria
- English publication date: 1985
- Pages: 324

The Weight of the World: A Journal (German: Das Gewicht der Welt. Ein Journal (Nov. 1975–März 1977)) is a 1977 book by the Austrian writer Peter Handke. It is Handke's notes or diary entries from a stay in Paris with his daughter from November 1975 to March 1977. It consists of descriptions of events including a mild heart attack and a love affair, and reflections about subjects such as fatherhood, middle age and fear of death. The book was published in German by Residenz Verlag in 1977 and in Ralph Manheim's English translation by Farrar, Straus and Giroux in 1984.
