= Repetition (Handke novel) =

1986 novel by Peter Handke

- Author: Peter Handke
- Original title: Die Wiederholung
- Translator: Ralph Manheim
- Language: German
- Publisher: Suhrkamp Verlag
- Publication date: 1986
- Publication place: Germany
- English publication date: 1988
- Pages: 333
- ISBN: 3518025805

Repetition (German: Die Wiederholung) is a 1986 novel by the Austrian writer Peter Handke. It tells the story of an Austrian of mixed German and Slovenian heritage, who goes to communist Yugoslavia in a search for identity.

== Reception ==
David Pryce-Jones of The New York Times wrote "The intention is to shatter Austrian complacency, utterly to reject the national conspiracy of silence and evasion, so that the Austrian at last can be his own man. Admirable as this would be, Mr. Handke is not the writer for it. To some extent, the alienation of this novel is attributable to the deliberate distancing of its style." Pryce-Jones continued: "More crucially, Repetition reveals one man set so implacably against his fellows that he can do nothing but pity himself and hate them. Surrender to these reactions serves to extend the Nazi legacy rather than to destroy it. New beginnings without humanity are not new beginnings at all."

The German writer W.G. Sebald, in his essay "Across the Border", discussed the influence of Repetition on his own work, and closed his essay as follows: “In Repetition, Handke allows the peculiar light which illuminates the space under a leafy canopy or a tent canvas to glisten between words, placed here with astounding caution and precision; in doing so, he succeeds in making the text into a sort of refuge amid the arid lands which, even in the culture industry, grow larger day by day.”

Gabriel Josipovici of The Guardian closed his review by stating that "[Handke's] narrative ... is one of the most dignified and moving evocations I have ever read of what it means to be alive, to walk upon this earth."

== See also ==
- 1986 in literature
- Austrian literature
