= The Moravian Night =

2008 novel by Peter Handke

- Author: Peter Handke
- Original title: Die morawische Nacht
- Translator: Krishna Winston
- Language: German
- Publisher: Suhrkamp Verlag
- Publication date: 12 January 2008
- Publication place: Germany
- English publication date: 6 December 2016
- Pages: 560
- ISBN: 978-3-518-41950-2

The Moravian Night (German: Die morawische Nacht) is a 2008 novel by the Austrian writer Peter Handke. It tells the story of a retired writer who talks about a recent journey and the state of Europe in front of a small crowd on his houseboat, while anchored outside the village Porodin on the river Morava in Serbia.

The book was published in English in 2016, translated by Krishna Winston.

== Reception ==
=== Critical response ===
Publishers Weekly wrote: "In this story where memory and reality battle, Handke (The Goalie's Anxiety at the Penalty Kick) once again showcases his valuable insight and imagination." Kirkus Reviews wrote: "A sad story—perhaps, but one in which fantasy and history dance nimbly. Stellar." Joshua Cohen wrote in The New York Times that The Moravian Night "might be the most important novel of Handke's career", and that "Handke has written a poignant book almost despite himself, or to spite the day, out of the grim confusion of his ruins". The Moravian Night was subsequently reviewed in The New York Review of Books, The Times Literary Supplement and Bookforum.

=== Accolades ===
The Moravian Night was longlisted for the 2008 German Book Prize, although the nomination was rejected by Handke, according to himself out of respect for the younger writers on the list. The book was also longlisted for the 2008 European Book Prize.
