= My Year in the No-Man's-Bay =

1994 novel by Peter Handke

- Author: Peter Handke
- Original title: Mein Jahr in der Niemandsbucht
- Translator: Krishna Winston
- Language: German
- Publisher: Suhrkamp Verlag
- Publication date: 5 November 1994
- Publication place: Germany
- English publication date: 5 August 1998
- Pages: 1066
- ISBN: 978-3-518-40608-3

My Year in the No-Man's-Bay (German: Mein Jahr in der Niemandsbucht) is a 1994 novel by the Austrian writer Peter Handke. It follows a writer's attempt to describe a metamorphosis he went through two decades earlier, when he stopped being confrontative and instead became a passive observer. The task proves to be difficult and most of the book is instead concerned with the lives of the narrator, his family and the people in the Paris suburb where he lives. The book is 1066 pages long in its original German. It was published in English in 1998, translated by Krishna Winston.

== Reception ==
Volker Hage of Der Spiegel compared the book to works by Botho Strauß, as both Strauß and Handke use literature to reflect on the activity of writing. Hage wrote that My Year in the No-Man's-Bay may be described as "postmodern literati-literature", something critics have anticipated with horror, but continued: "What does such a label matter, when the prose is as intense as relaxed, as surprising as obvious, as beautiful as original".

When the English translation was published in 1998, Publishers Weekly's critic wrote: "Despite attaining moments of stylistic lucidity worthy of Montaigne, the narrator more often comes across as gloomy and hostile. Nonetheless, numerous trenchant moments of insight make this work intriguing and provocative." Lee Siegel reviewed the book for The New York Times. He described it as "one carefully observed image after another expanding into a cinematically eternal present tense", which according to Siegel means that "in a sense, then, Handke's novel is an argument for the superiority of film to the novel". The critic continued: "Though at times intellectually bracing, this can make for pretty arid reading. And Handke's attempts at elevating his epic of self-regarding banality often make matters worse. Rejecting character, plot and psychology as mere fictions, he relies on an ostentatious thematic framework that winds up being more implausible than any old-fashioned novelistic trick." Publishers Weekly called the English translation "impeccable", while Siegel called it "clumsy and overliteral".
