= Heldenplatz (play) =

1988 stage drama by Thomas Bernhard

- Written by: Thomas Bernhard
- Original language: German
- Subject: Nationalism antisemitism
- Setting: Vienna

Premiere
- Date premiered: November 4, 1988
- Place premiered: Burgtheater

Heldenplatz (English: Heroes' Square) is a 1988 stage drama by Austrian playwright Thomas Bernhard. The final play written by Bernhard, it premiered on November 4, 1988, and sparked one of the biggest theater scandals in the history of post-war Austria.

== History ==
Heldenplatz was commissioned by Claus Peymann, director of the Viennese Burgtheater, to be performed for the hundredth anniversary of the theater's opening. The year also coincided with the 50th anniversary of the Anschluss when Nazi Germany annexed Austria. Heldenplatz is the square where Adolf Hitler was greeted on March 15, 1938, and he addressed thousands of jubilant Austrians.

Bernhard wrote his play as a tragic reflection on the obsessive politics of nationalism, the denial of the past and the continued antisemitism within modern Austria. Although the play was to be published only after the premiere, selected extracts were leaked to the press in the days prior to the first performance. On October 7, 1988, Kronen Zeitung, the Austrian tabloid newspaper with the highest circulation, published a story about the play titled "Austria, 6.5 million idiots", quoting excerpts from the play. The quotations, taken out of context, caused a public uproar, and Bernhard was vilified. Heldenplatz was also understood as a veiled attack on the election of Austria's president Kurt Waldheim, who called the play "an insult to the Austrian people". Critics of the play questioned whether the state should subsidize art critical of Austria. Demonstrations were held and Bernhard, in one instance, was physically assaulted.

Bernhard's sudden death by a heart attack only a few months after the premiere only increased media attention on the play's subject.

In a 2024 Burgtheater staging of the play by Frank Castorf the location is moved to 1930s New York City. According to one critic added texts by Thomas Wolfe took up as much time as the originals.

In his 1989 will Thomas Bernhard had forbidden the publication or performance of his works in Austria for 70 years.

== Summary ==
It is the day of the funeral of Josef Schuster, a Jewish university professor. Through the three-act play, his wife Hedwig Schuster, their children, Olga, Anna and Luka, his brother, Robert Schuster, Mrs. Zittel, the housekeeper and Herta, the maid, discuss Josef. it is revealed that fifty years after March 15, 1938, Josef could no longer bear the clamor that always resonated in his head. The couple had decided to return to Oxford where they had lived for ten years in exile before returning to Vienna "for the love of music". A few days before their departure, considering that "now everything is worse than fifty years ago" and that "there are now more Nazis in Vienna than in 1938", Joseph Schuster commits suicide by throwing himself out the window from their apartment overlooking Heldenplatz. The play includes a line about "a nation of 6.5 million idiots living in a country that is rotting away, falling apart, run by the political parties in an unholy alliance with the Catholic Church."

Thomas Bernhard, through his characters, critiques the persistent antisemitism in Austria, lamenting how he could not "listen to Beethoven without thinking of Nuremberg," and expressing his disbelief that "the Austrians after the war would be much more hateful and anti-Semitic than before the war."

== English publication ==
Heldenplatz was first translated by Gita Honegger and published in issue 33 of Conjunctions in 1999. A separate translation, by Meredith Oakes and Andrea Tierney, was published by Oberon Books in 2010 and premiered on stage in London that same year.
