= Theater am Turm =

Theatre in Frankfurt, Germany

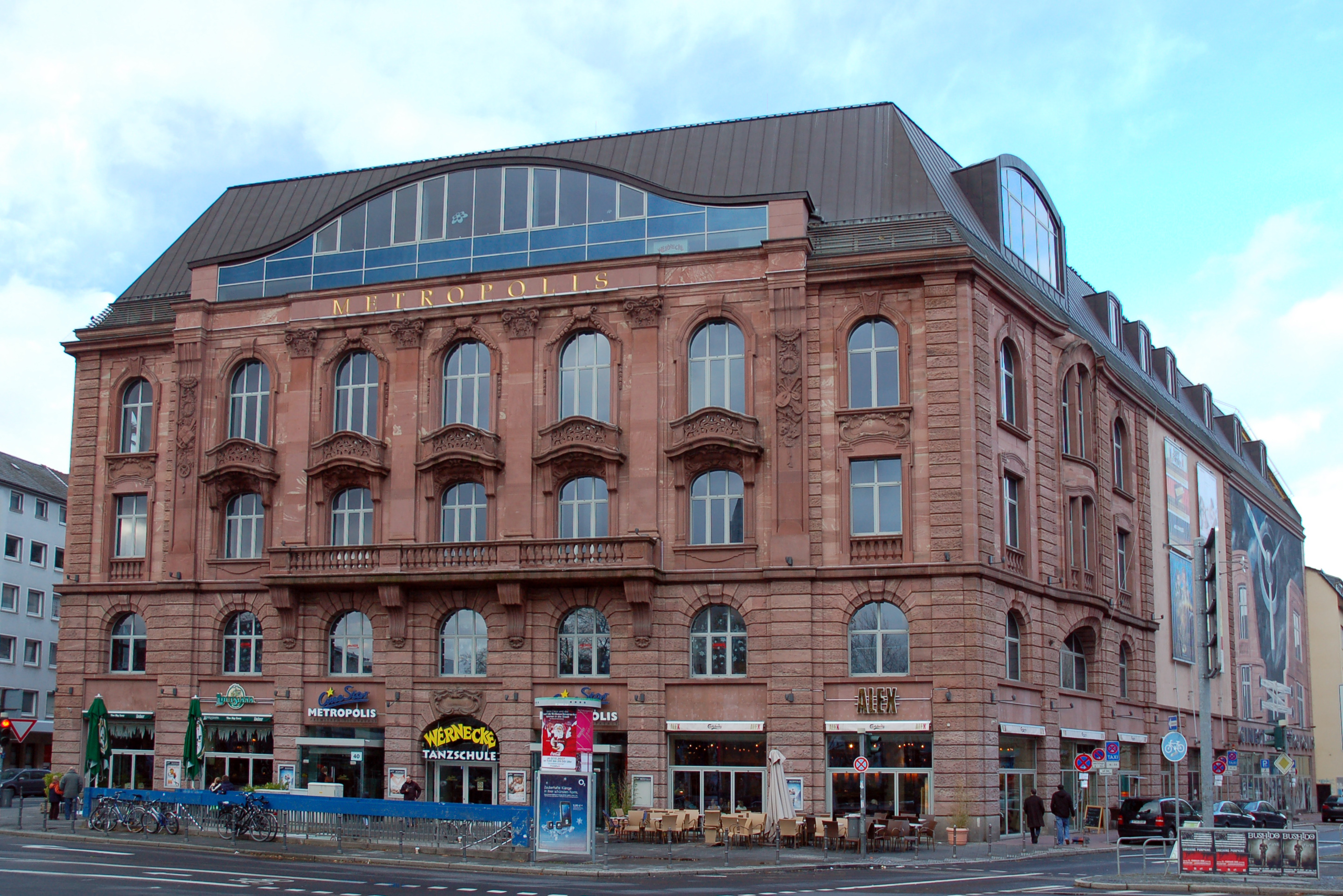
- Venue 1963 to 1995: the former Volksbildungsheim
- Interactive map of Theater am Turm
- Address: Frankfurt, Hesse; Germany
- Coordinates: 50°7′15″N 8°39′7″E
- Type: Theatre

Construction
- Closed: 2004

Theater am Turm (theatre at the tower), styled TAT, was a theatre in Frankfurt, Hesse, Germany. It was founded in 1956. The tower in the title first meant the Eschenheimer Turm near an early venue, and could be applied to the Bockenheimer Warte after the theatre moved to the Bockenheimer Depot.

The theatre was widely recognised in the 1960s and 1970s, when it was close to the student movement and produced a series called experimenta. The 1966 world premiere of Peter Handke's Publikumsbeschimpfung (Offending the Audience), directed by Claus Peymann, made theatre history. In the 1980s, after a period of restoration of the building, the theatre became a venue for experimental performances. From 1995 the TAT was run by the Frankfurt municipal stages and the venue moved, but it was closed in 2004 due to lack of funding.

== History ==
=== Background ===
Frankfurt's municipal stages, the opera house and the Schauspielhaus were destroyed in World War II. When the Schauspielhaus was finally rebuilt in 1951, it was used for operas, while dramas were played on provisional stages; the Börsensaal and a school gym.

Another theatre was founded in 1953, named Landesbühne Rhein-Main (State theatre Rhein-Main), by the Frankfurter Bund für Volksbildung, an association for adult education. Among the managers of the early period was the director and actor Georg Aufenanger.

=== TAT ===
in 1963 the theatre moved to the former Volksbildungsheim at the Eschenheimer Tor. It was named Theater am Turm (TAT), alluding to the Eschenheimer Turm, part of the historic city fortification. It presented classical plays, boulevard theatre and plays in Hessian dialect.

In the mid-1960s, the standard was raised and the theatre became politically and socially relevant, with Felix Müller as Intendant and Claus Peymann first as director, later also Intendant. In 1966 Peymann directed, as part of the experimenta I, the world premiere of Peter Handke's Publikumsbeschimpfung (Offending the Audience). The play features four actors in jeans and sweaters addressing the mostly formally dressed audience, making them the topic of the production and telling them "You are not a nice idea. You are not a rewarding topic. You are a dramatic mistake." In the final scene offending terms such as "warmongers" and "subhumans" were thrown at them in staccato speed, also "you outcasts of society, you gawkers, you neck-shooting specialists". At the time of the Beatles and the Rolling Stones, it was a revolt against the establishment. Part of the audience in the premiere was amused and offered long applause, but there was riot, hissing and booing; the second performance, recorded for television, ended in brawl in the audience, to the author's delight. The production was recognised throughout Germany and discussed controversially. The theatre critic Günther Rühle regarded the performance as the beginning of modern theatre. It made the theatre, the author and the director trade marks; the theatre was called "politically courageous and innovative".

In the following years, the TAT was close to the student movement and the fight against the German Emergency Acts. In 1969 a Mitbestimmungstheater, a model of collective decision-making, was established, and the program featured not only drama but also discussions and lectures in Marxism. Rainer Werner Fassbinder's play Die bitteren Tränen der Petra von Kant had its world premiere at the TAT as part of the experimenta series in 1972 Invited by Hilmar Hoffmann, responsible for culture in Frankfurt, he became Intendant of the TAT in 1974. He began with an adaption of Germinal, a novel by Emile Zola, which had roles for almost all ensemble members. He was initially impressed by the Mitbestimmungstheater, but became disillusioned by the tedious discussions that came with it. A productions of Strindberg's Fräulein Julie, with him in the main male role, caused frictions, and the performance of his 1974 play Der Müll, die Stadt und der Tod, dealing with the Frankfurter Häuserkampf, was cancelled after protests against antisemitic stereotypes, which made Fassbinder leave after only eight months.

==== 1980s ====
The TAT was rebuilt and opened again in 1980 with a new concept. It had no ensemble but offered a stage for free experimental groups and international performers such as the dance company of Vivienne Newport. From 1986, inspired by dramaturge Tom Stromberg, the theatre showed again more house productions.

==== Bockenheimer Depot ====
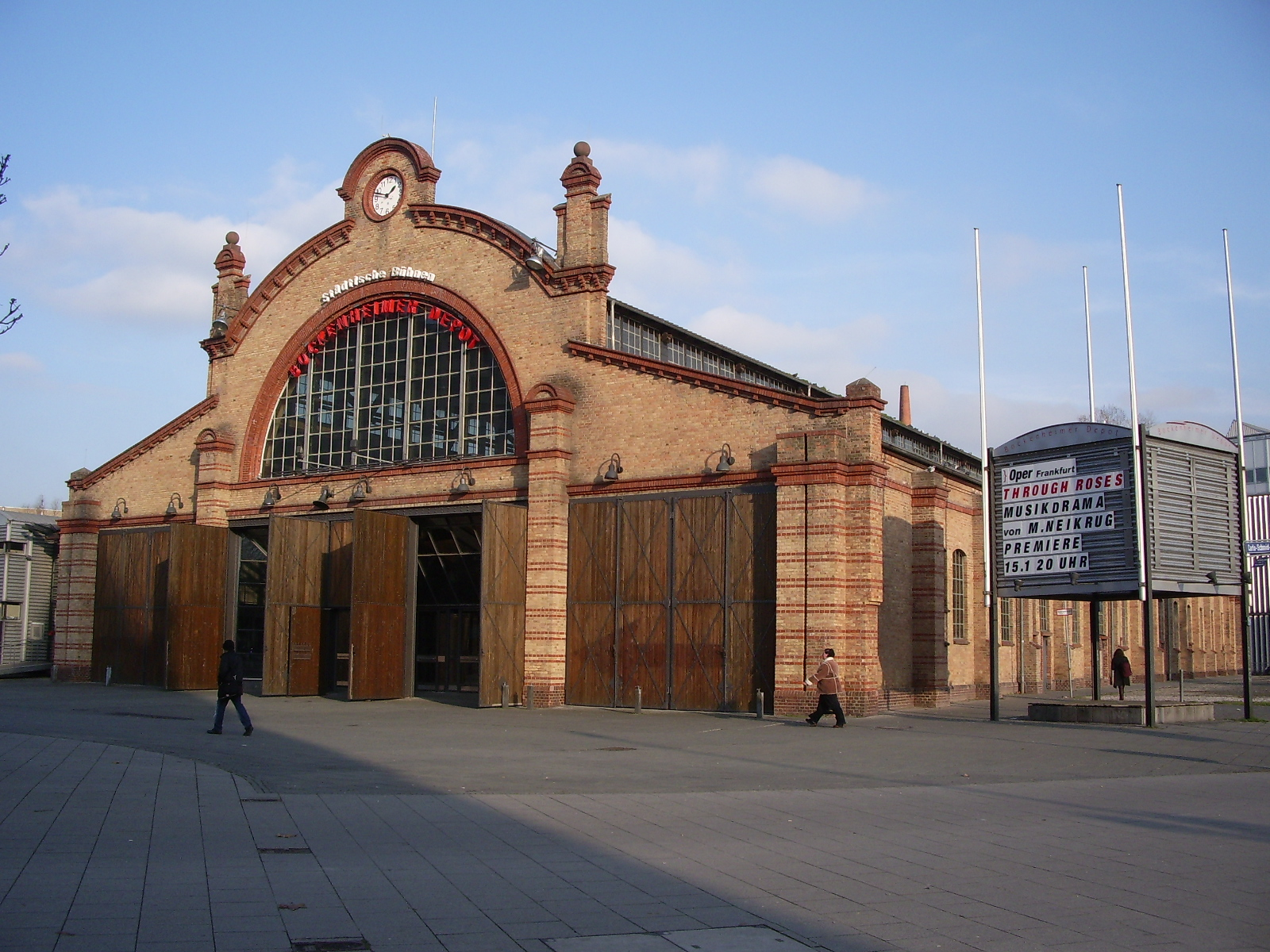
Last venue: Bockenheimer Depot, 1995 to 2004

In 1995 the TAT moved to a new location of the Frankfurt municipal theatres, the Bockenheimer Depot, because the former venue was rebuilt as a cinema, Metropolis. It was located next to the Bockenheimer Warte tower, leaving the name fitting. At the time, the TAT became part of the Städtische Bühnen Frankfurt. It was close to being closed several times because of reduced financial support from the city. From 1999 a team of choreographer William Forsythe as artistic director and Tom Kühnel and Robert Schuster as drama directors ran the theatre. In May 2004, it was closed for financial reasons.
