= The Beautiful Days of Aranjuez =

2016 film

- Film poster
- Directed by: Wim Wenders
- Screenplay by: Wim Wenders
- Based on: Les Beaux Jours d'Aranjuez by Peter Handke
- Produced by: Paulo Branco; Gian-Piero Ringel
- Starring: Reda Kateb; Sophie Semin; Jens Harzer; Nick Cave
- Cinematography: Benoît Debie
- Edited by: Beatrice Babin
- Production companies: Alfama Films; Neue Road Movies
- Release dates: 1 September 2016 (Venice); 5 October 2016 (France); 24 November 2016 (Germany)
- Running time: 97 minutes
- Countries: France; Germany
- Language: French

The Beautiful Days of Aranjuez (French: Les Beaux Jours d'Aranjuez) is a 2016 drama film directed by Wim Wenders. It is based on the 2012 play Die schönen Tage von Aranjuez by Peter Handke. It was selected to compete for the Golden Lion at the 73rd Venice International Film Festival.

== Plot ==
A man (Reda Kateb) and a woman (Sophie Semin) are sitting on chairs in a garden outside of Paris on a bright summer day. All day long they talk about life and love.

== Cast ==
- Reda Kateb as the man
- Sophie Semin as the woman
- Nick Cave as himself
- Peter Handke as the gardener
- Jens Harzer as the writer

== Reception ==
The film garnered a 30% approval rating from 10 critics, with an average rating of 4.1 out of 10, on Rotten Tomatoes. Metacritic provides a score of 32 out of 100 from 6 critics, which indicates "generally unfavorable" reviews.

Peter Bradshaw of The Guardian gave the film 2 stars out of 5, calling it "an inert and exasperatingly supercilious two-hander: self-conscious, tedious, with a dated and cumbersome theatricality, tricked out in a 3D presentation that adds nothing to its dull stereoscopic tableaux of an idealised French garden outside Paris." Deborah Young of The Hollywood Reporter praised Virginie Hernvann's production design.

Ben Croll of IndieWire gave the film a grade of D, saying, "I think it could live on as a curiosity, as an answer to the question, 'What is the most uniquely spoiler-impervious film since Andy Warhol aimed his camera at the Empire State Building and let it roll for eight hours?'" Guy Lodge of Variety said, "Even for Wenders completists, the film is of mostly academic interest: an intermediate entry in the filmmaker's ongoing investigation into the possibilities of stereoscopic imagery, thus far deployed to far more vibrant effect in his documentaries than in his narrative work."
