= Storm Still =

2010 play by Peter Handke

Immer noch Sturm Storm Still
- First edition (German)
- Author: Peter Handke
- Genre: Drama
- Publisher: Suhrkamp Verlag
- Publication date: 2010
- Publication place: Austria

Storm Still (German: Immer noch Sturm) is a 2010 play by the Austrian writer Peter Handke. The narrator, with traces of Handke himself, looks back at the National Socialist era, when one Slovenian family in Carinthia collaborates with the Germans, while another opposes them.

The play was published as a book on 20 September 2010 through Suhrkamp Verlag. It premiered on stage in August 2011, directed by Dimiter Gotscheff for the Salzburg Festival, as a co-production between the festival and Hamburg's Thalia Theater. It received the Mülheimer Dramatikerpreis in 2012. It was published in English in 2013, translated by Martin Chalmers.
