= Short Letter, Long Farewell =

1972 novel by Peter Handke

- First edition
- Author: Peter Handke
- Original title: Der kurze Brief zum langen Abschied
- Translator: Ralph Manheim
- Language: German
- Publisher: Suhrkamp Verlag
- Publication date: 1972
- Publication place: Germany
- English publication date: 1974
- Pages: 194

Short Letter, Long Farewell (German: Der kurze Brief zum langen Abschied) is a 1972 novel by the Austrian writer Peter Handke. It tells the story of a young Austrian writer who travels across the United States in search of his wife from whom he is estranged. The film-director John Ford appears as a character who brings resolution at the end of the road on the coast of California. His film Young Mr. Lincoln also serves as a point of reference and an antidote to the alienation experienced by the stranger crossing the States. The novel shares many themes and motifs with the film Alice in the Cities from 1974, directed by Handke's frequent collaborator Wim Wenders; the film can be seen as a response to the book.

== See also ==
- 1972 in literature
- Austrian literature
