= Offending the Audience =

Play by Peter Handke

Publikumsbeschimpfung Offending the Audience
- Written by: Peter Handke
- Characters: four speakers
- Original language: German
- Genre: "anti-play"

Premiere
- Date premiered: 1966
- Place premiered: Theater am Turm, Frankfurt

Offending the Audience (Publikumsbeschimpfung) is a play by Austrian writer Peter Handke. It is sometimes called an anti-play because of its renouncements of theatricality. It was originally published in German under the title Publikumsbeschimpfung (which better translates as "Insulting the Audience") in 1966. It premiered in June 1966 at the Theater am Turm in Frankfurt as part of the "Experimental Theatre Week", directed by Claus Peymann. The play was first produced in London in 1970 at the Almost Free Theatre in Soho by the Interaction Arts Cooperative's TOC (The Other Company) directed by Israeli writer and theatre director Naftali Yavin; the cast included Andrew Norton, Judy Monahan, Jane Bond, Robert Walker and Jan Chappell.

== Contextual information ==
In a 1970 interview Handke said that the idea behind his plays was "making people aware of the world of the theatre--not of the outside world." He goes on to say that specifically in the case of Offending the Audience, his "point was to use words to encircle the audience so they'd want to free themselves by heckling; they might feel naked and get involved." He further goes on to explain his intentions:

The idea was to have the spectators in the orchestra thrown back upon themselves. What mattered to me was making them feel like going to the theatre more, making them see all plays more consciously and with a different consciousness. My theatrical plan is to have the audience always look upon my play as a means of testing other plays. I first intended to write an essay, a pamphlet, against the theatre, but then I realized that a paperback isn't an effective way to publish an anti-theatre statement. And so the outcome was, paradoxically, doing something onstage against the stage, using the theatre to protest against the theatre of the moment--I don't mean theatre as such, the Absolute, I mean theatre as a historical phenomenon, as it is to this day.

== Plot synopsis ==
In Offending the Audience there is no plot. No story is being told at all. Instead, the audience is made aware that what they see is not a representation of anything else, but is in fact quite literal. The actors continuously repeat the point that this is not a play, and that nothing theatrical will happen.

The first lines of the performance are "You are welcome. This piece is a prologue." A prologue, that is, to all future theatrical performances.

== Analysis ==
Handke used this rejection of traditional play structure to reinforce his anti-theatre intention. His point was to get the audience to consider what exactly theatre does, in particular, the role of language in the theatre.

== Character guide ==
The only cast the play calls for are 'Four Speakers'. However, this has been performed with a cast of upwards of twenty actors. Rather than placing the focus on themselves, the actors instead turn the audience into the main point of interest by making them aware of how they are breathing, sitting, thinking, etc. They draw attention to what they are wearing and how they have gone through the motions of "going to the theatre."

== Character analysis ==
Four Speakers, a mixed group of men and women. The four characters in this play do not assume a "role" in any traditional sense. The speakers remain merely anonymous actors who address the audience in the author's words. They are also largely indistinguishable from one another and even from the members of the audience. Their clothing is ordinary casual dress. It is expected that the men, in both the audience and on stage, will be wearing dark jackets and white shirts with plain ties. Women are expected to be dressed in subdued colors. During their time onstage, the four speakers address the audience directly without singling out any specific individuals. They speak in a bland litany, free of emotion, vocal inflection, or any significant gestures. Nor are any specific lines assigned to the individual speakers. The characters merely pick up and leave off the discourse in a random order, speaking for varying lengths of time. Frequently, and without explanation, they contradict themselves and one another. In doing so, however, they give no indication of their own feelings about what they are saying beyond a general statement to the audience that their opinions may (or may not) be the same as those of the author. At the end of the performance, the four speakers react to the audience in exactly the same manner regardless of whether the audience's response to their work has been favorable or unfavorable.

Since there are no actual characters, the actors' job is merely to recite the lines to the audience. The more objective they are, the closer they are to Handke's intention of isolating the actors from the audience in order to emphasize the language. Handke listed some "Rules for the actors" at the beginning of the script including such things as watching "the behaviour of tramps and idlers as they amble on the street and play the machines in the penny arcades."

== Genre ==
It is difficult to classify such a non-play play into a specific genre. In some ways Offending the Audience could be considered a dark comedy since it utilizes irony so heavily. However, Handke's intention was for it to be unclassifiable as anti-genre and anti-form.

== Style ==
Offending the Audience falls under the style of epic theater as established by dramatist Bertolt Brecht. A major characteristic of epic theater is alienation, which is used to prevent the audience from becoming emotionally involved and distracted from the underlying issue of the play. In this particular case, the fact that the actors are not pretending to be other characters and are instead speaking straightforwardly to the audience is an alienation effect. Some other aspects of epic theater are minimal staging, anti-illusionment, and telling what is to come—all of which are seen in Offending the Audience.

== Language ==
Handke wished to challenge the relationship of language and reality and to make the audience "intensely, unbearably conscious of the fundamentally arbitrary connections between words and things, until the linguistic mucilage that holds the world and our minds together crumbles." The most prominent way of how Handke challenged the meaning of language is found at the very end of the play. The actors first begin to compliment the audience on how perfect they were and then proceed to call them various insults. The names the actors call the audience seem to become more and more random. The point here is to create acoustic patterns in the words so that they eventually become meaningless.

== Theme ==
As is evident from the name, the whole show leads up to the point at the end where the audience gets "offended." The significance of the insults at the end is questioned—-what exactly makes these words (any words for that matter) more than just noise, but items which hold meaning.

Handke wanted to take the ideas of language and theatre—two subjects which were often accepted as they were without question—and point out why they didn't get questioned or challenged very often.

== Spectacle ==
In theme with the whole anti-theatre idea, Offending the Audience has very minimalistic production values. The stage is usually bare, but there could be a false set in order to deceive the audience into thinking that it will be a conventional play.

== Music ==
Handke was influenced and inspired by the music of the time. One of his "Rules for the actors" is to listen to "Tell Me" by the Rolling Stones. He was especially influenced by the Beatles. Two more of his rules are to see the Beatles' movies and "watch Ringo's smile" in A Hard Day's Night.

== Sample production history ==
Offending the Audience has been performed all over Europe since its German premiere in 1966, and after its translation was published in English in 1970. The first performance was by Michael Locascio's troupe at various locations in New York City in 1969.

Subsequently, it was produced at numerous locations, especially colleges, in the U.S., Australia, China, South Africa and the UK. It was revived in 2008 at The Flea Theater in New York City.
