= Krishna Winston =

American academic and translator of German literature

Krishna Winston is an American academic and translator of German literature. She is the daughter of translators Richard and Clara Winston. She obtained her BA at Smith College, followed by an MPhil and a doctorate from Yale University. She is currently the Marcus L. Taft Professor of German Language and Literature at Wesleyan University.

She has translated more than 30 books, including works by Oskar Schlemmer, Golo Mann, Grete Weil, Christoph Hein, Peter Handke, Werner Herzog, and Günter Grass. She has received several prizes for excellence in translation. These include the Schlegel-Tieck Prize (twice) and the Kurt and Helen Wolff Prize.

== Selected translations ==
- The Moravian Night, Peter Handke. FSG.
- The Great Fall, Peter Handke. Seagull.
- Starlite Terrace, Patrick Roth. Seagull.2013
- From Germany to Germany, Günter Grass. Harcourt. 2012
- The Box. Günter Grass. Harcourt, 2010
- Conquest of the Useless, Werner Herzog. HarperCollins/Echo, 2009.
- Memoirs, Hans Jonas. Brandeis/Tauber Institute, 2008.
- Crabwalk, Günter Grass. Harcourt, 2003.
- On a Dark Night I Left My Quiet House, Peter Handke. FSG, 2000.
- Too Far Afield, Günter Grass. Harcourt, 2000. (Schlegel-Tieck Prize, Helen and Kurt Wolff Translator's Prize)
- My Year in the No-Man's Bay, Peter Handke. FSG, 1998.
- Joseph Goebbels, Ralf Georg Reuth. Harcourt, 1993. (Schlegel-Tieck Prize)
- The Anarchy of the Imagination, Rainer Werner Fassbinder. Johns Hopkins for PAJ Books, 1992.
- With the Next Man Everything Will Be Different, Eva Heller. Random House, 1992.
- The Hour of the Women, Count Christian von Krockow. HarperCollins, 1991.
- Two States, One Nation, Günter Grass. Harcourt, 1990.
- Reminiscences and Reflections, Golo Mann. Norton, 1990.
- The Distant Lover, Christoph Hein. Pantheon, 1989.
- Wilhelm Meister's Journeyman Years, Goethe. Suhrkamp, 1989.
