= Kaspar (play) =

Play written by Austrian playwright Peter Handke (1967)

Kaspar & Other Plays
- First English edition
- Author: Peter Handke
- Genre: Drama
- Publisher: Farrar, Straus and Giroux
- Publication date: Published in English in 1967
- Publication place: Austria
- ISBN: 0809015463

Kaspar is a play written by Austrian playwright Peter Handke. It was published in 1967. It was Handke's first full-length drama and was hailed by Max Frisch as the "play of the decade". It depicts "the foundling Kaspar Hauser as a near-speechless innocent destroyed by society’s attempts to impose on him its language and its own rational values."

== Plot summary ==
Kaspar is loosely based on the story of Kaspar Hauser. "Raised in a dark hole, at 17 he wandered into a 1824 German town knowing only a single sentence and became a scientific curiosity: a nearly-adult human without language and external influences, a tabula rasa upon which society and its scientific teachers could write with impunity."

== Major Themes ==
Kaspar is about language and its ability to torture. In this play Handke "allows us to listen differently and to reflect on how language is forced upon us by a society where conformism is the norm and received speech an almost tyrannical exploitation of the individual."

It is also a play that suggests individuals are bound to negate themselves under the pressure of the societies that they live in. "What Kaspar experiences on stage can happen daily: The need or desire to conform, to observe and imitate someone else’s words and actions, to assert oneself and at the same time, negate oneself."

Individuals can also invent themselves using the language. In Kaspar, Handke writes: "Already you have a sentence with which you can make yourself noticeable . . . You can explain to yourself how it goes with you . . . You have a sentence with which you can bring order into every disorder . . ."

Handke himself wrote in the prologue to the play: "The play Kaspar does not show how IT REALLY IS or REALLY WAS with Kaspar Hauser. It shows what is POSSIBLE with someone. It shows how someone can be made to speak through speaking. The play could also be called speech torture."

One critique summarised the theme of Kaspar thus: "the inherent authoritative power of language itself to shape, twist, expand, delimit, and mediate human experience, the ultimate tragicomic story of socialization and civilization.

== Kaspar in Iran ==
Mohsen Moeini was the dramaturgist and director of the play, produced by Negin Mirhasani Vahed. It went on stage in Av Hall and run was extended three time and was widely praised by the audience.
