= A Sorrow Beyond Dreams =

1972 novella by Peter Handke

- First edition
- Author: Peter Handke
- Original title: Wunschloses Unglück
- Translator: Ralph Manheim
- Language: German
- Publisher: 1972 Residenz Verlag; 1975 (English)
- Publication place: Austria
- Pages: 98

A Sorrow Beyond Dreams (German: Wunschloses Unglück) is a 1972 semi-autobiographical novella by the Austrian writer Peter Handke. It describes the life of Handke's mother Maria, who committed suicide on 19 November 1971.

== Reception ==
Thomas Curwen of the Los Angeles Times wrote in 2003: "Mental illness is a phrase you won't find in Handke's account of his mother's death, yet it surely waits in the wings. ... While the pleasure, if this is the word, of reading Handke comes from the existential assumptions of his story, it is important to realize that suicide -- the reality, as opposed to the idea (which Camus seemed to savor) -- is not an existential dilemma. It is the final, tragic outcome of a psychiatric illness. Yet how prepared are we for this knowledge?" Karl Ove Knausgård described the novella as one of the “most important books written in German in our time”.

== See also ==
- 1972 in literature
- Austrian literature
