= The Goalie's Anxiety at the Penalty Kick =

1970 novel by Peter Handke

- First edition
- Author: Peter Handke
- Original title: Die Angst des Tormanns beim Elfmeter
- Translator: Michael Roloff
- Language: German
- Publisher: Suhrkamp Verlag
- Publication date: 1970
- Publication place: Germany
- English publication date: 1972
- Pages: 124

The Goalie's Anxiety at the Penalty Kick (German: Die Angst des Tormanns beim Elfmeter) is a 1970 short novel by the Austrian Nobel Prize winning writer Peter Handke. It was adapted into a 1972 film with the same title, directed by Wim Wenders.

== See also ==
- 1970 in literature
- Austrian literature
