= Peter Handke =

Austrian Nobel laureate novelist (born 1942)

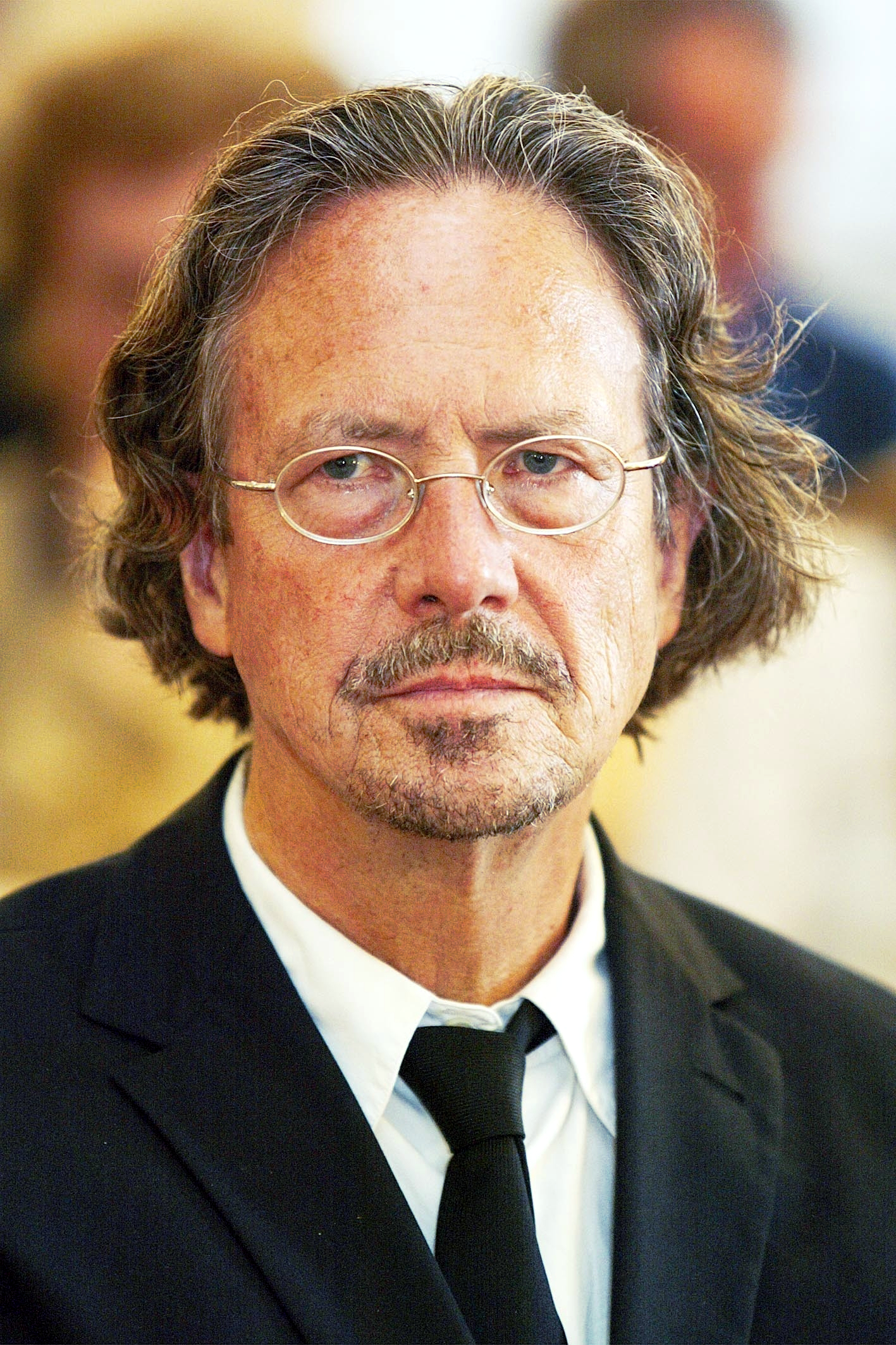
- Handke in 2006
- Born: 6 December 1942 (age 83); Griffen, Austria
- Education: University of Graz
- Occupations: Novelist; Playwright
- Spouse: Sophie Semin (m. 1995)
- Writing career
- Notable works: Offending the Audience; Kaspar; A Sorrow Beyond Dreams; Repetition
- Notable awards: Georg Büchner Prize (1973); Vilenica International Literary Prize (1987); International Ibsen Award (2014); Nobel Prize in Literature (2019)

Peter Handke (German: [ˈpeːtɐ ˈhantkə]; born 6 December 1942) is an Austrian novelist, playwright, translator, poet, film director, and screenwriter. He was awarded the 2019 Nobel Prize in Literature "for an influential work that with linguistic ingenuity has explored the periphery and the specificity of human experience." Handke is considered to be one of the most influential and original German-language writers in the second half of the 20th century.

In the late 1960s, he earned his reputation as a member of the avant-garde with such plays as Offending the Audience (1966) in which actors analyze the nature of theatre and alternately insult the audience and praise its "performance", and Kaspar (1967). His novels, mostly ultra objective, deadpan accounts of characters in extreme states of mind, include The Goalie's Anxiety at the Penalty Kick (1970) and The Left-Handed Woman (1976). Prompted by his mother's suicide in 1971, he reflected her life in the novella A Sorrow Beyond Dreams (1972). In 1973, he won the Georg Büchner Prize, the most important literary prize for German-language literature.

A dominant theme of his works is the deadening effects and underlying irrationality of ordinary language, everyday reality, and rational order. Handke was a member of the Grazer Gruppe (an association of authors) and the Grazer Autorenversammlung, and co-founded the Verlag der Autoren publishing house in Frankfurt. He collaborated with director Wim Wenders, and wrote such screenplays as The Wrong Move and Wings of Desire.

In 1999, as a protest against the NATO bombing of Yugoslavia, Handke returned the prize money for the Büchner Prize to the German Academy for Language and Literature. Handke has provoked intense controversy and accusations of genocide denial for his public support of Serbian nationalism in the Yugoslav Wars.

== Life ==
=== Early life and family ===
Handke was born in Griffen, in Carinthia, Austria (then an annexed part of Germany). His father, Erich Schönemann, was a bank clerk and German soldier whom Handke did not meet until adulthood. His mother Maria, a Carinthian Slovene, married Bruno Handke, a tram conductor and Wehrmacht soldier from Berlin, before Peter was born. The family lived in the Soviet-occupied Pankow district of Berlin from 1944 to 1948, where Maria Handke had two more children: Peter's half-sister and half-brother. Then the family moved to his mother's home town of Griffen. Peter experienced his stepfather as more and more violent due to alcoholism.

In 1954, Handke was sent to the Catholic Marianum boys' boarding school at Tanzenberg Castle in Sankt Veit an der Glan. There, he published his first writing in the school newspaper, Fackel. In 1959, he moved to Klagenfurt, where he went to high school, and commenced law studies at the University of Graz in 1961.

Handke's mother took her own life in 1971, reflected in his novel Wunschloses Unglück (A Sorrow Beyond Dreams).

After leaving Graz, Handke lived in Düsseldorf, Berlin, Kronberg, Paris, the U.S. (1978–1979) and Salzburg (1979–1988). Since 1990, he has resided in Chaville near Paris. He is the subject of the documentary film Peter Handke: In the Woods, Might Be Late (2016), directed by Corinna Belz. Since 2012, Handke has been a member of the Serbian Academy of Sciences and Arts. He is a member of the Serbian Orthodox Church.

In November 2019, Austrian authorities investigated reports that Handke had obtained a Yugoslav passport and possibly Yugoslav nationality during the 1990s, which could have triggered automatic loss of his Austrian citizenship. The investigation was closed in 2021.

=== Career ===
While studying, Handke established himself as a writer, linking up with the Grazer Gruppe (the Graz Authors' Assembly), an association of young writers. The group published a magazine on literature, manuskripte, which published Handke's early works. Group members included Wolfgang Bauer and Barbara Frischmuth.

Handke abandoned his studies in 1965, after the German publishing house Suhrkamp Verlag accepted his novel Die Hornissen (The Hornets) for publication. He gained international attention after an appearance at a meeting of avant-garde artists belonging to the Gruppe 47 in Princeton, New Jersey, in 1966. The same year, his play Publikumsbeschimpfung (Offending the Audience) premiered at the Theater am Turm in Frankfurt, directed by Claus Peymann. Handke became one of the co-founders of the publishing house Verlag der Autoren in 1969 with a new commercial concept, as it belonged to the authors. He co-founded the Grazer Autorenversammlung in 1973 and was a member until 1977.

Handke's first play, Publikumsbeschimpfung (Offending the Audience), which premiered in Frankfurt in 1966 and made him well known, was the first of several experimental plays without a conventional plot. In his second play, Kaspar, he treated the story of Kaspar Hauser as "an allegory of conformist social pressures".

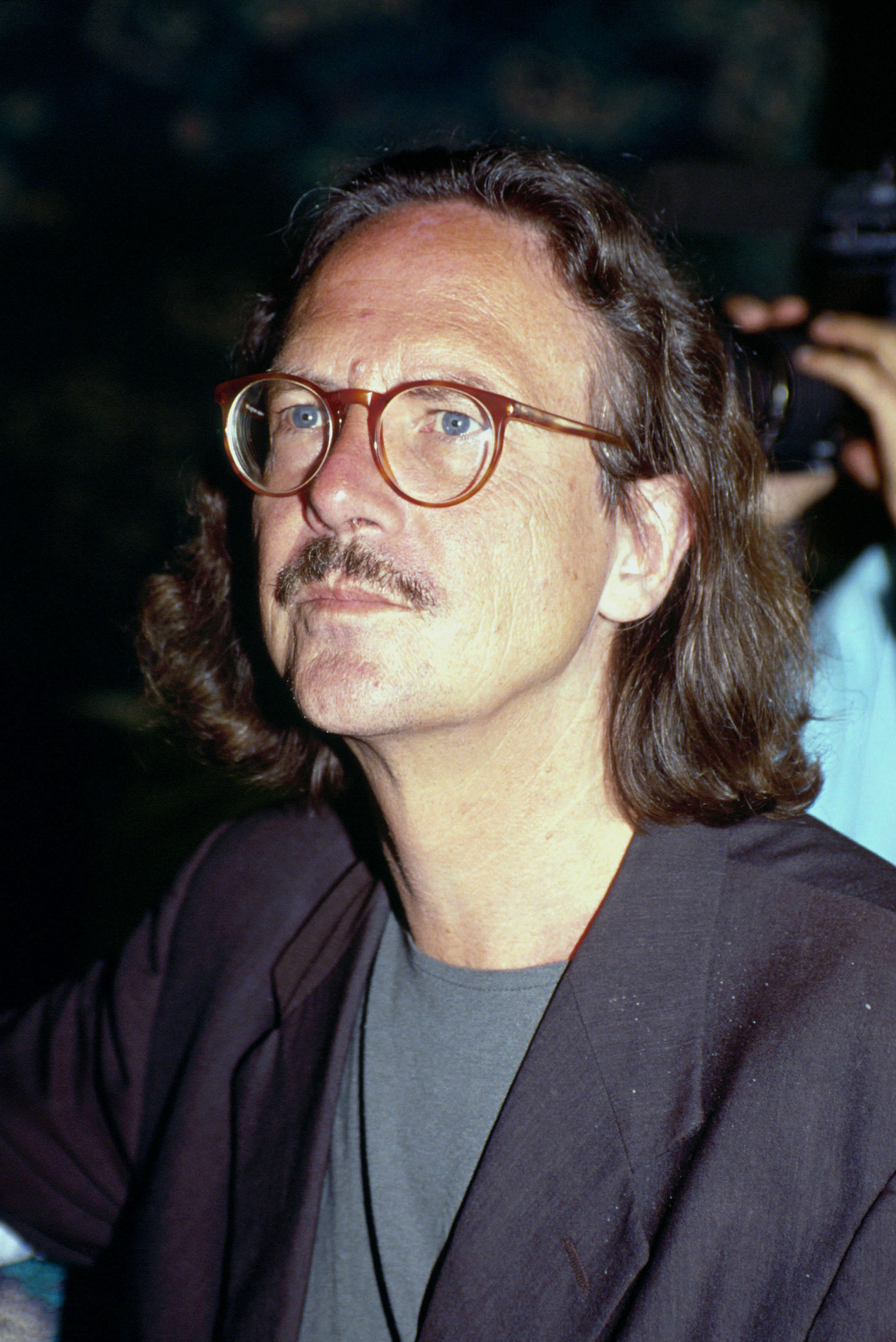
Handke in 1983

Handke collaborated with director Wim Wenders on a film version of Die Angst des Tormanns beim Elfmeter, wrote the script for Falsche Bewegung (The Wrong Move) and co-wrote the screenplay for Der Himmel über Berlin (Wings of Desire) including the poem at its opening and Les Beaux Jours d'Aranjuez (The Beautiful Days of Aranjuez). He also directed films, including adaptations from his novels The Left-Handed Woman after Die linkshändige Frau, and The Absence after Die Abwesenheit. The Left-Handed Woman, was released in 1978 and was nominated for the Golden Palm Award at the Cannes Film Festival in 1978 and won the Gold Award for German Arthouse Cinema in 1980. Leonard Maltin's Movie Guide's description of the film is that a woman demands that her husband leave and he complies. "Time passes... and the audience falls asleep." Handke also won the 1975 German Film Award in Gold for his screenplay for Falsche Bewegung (The Wrong Move). Since 1975, Handke has been a jury member of the European literary award Petrarca-Preis.

In 2019, Handke was awarded the Nobel Prize in Literature "for an influential work that with linguistic ingenuity has explored the periphery and the specificity of human experience."

== Literary reception ==
In 1977, reviewing A Moment of True Feeling, Stanley Kauffmann wrote that Handke "is the most important new writer on the international scene since Samuel Beckett." John Updike reviewed the same novel in The New Yorker and was equally impressed, noting that "there is no denying his [Handke's] willful intensity and knifelike clarity of evocation. He writes from an area beyond psychology, where feelings acquire the adamancy of randomly encountered, geologically analyzed pebbles." The Frankfurter Allgemeine Zeitung described him as "the darling of the West German critics." Hugo Hamilton stated that, since his debut, Handke "has tested, inspired and shocked audiences." Joshua Cohen noted that Handke "commands one of the great German-language prose styles of the post-war period, a riverine rhetoric deep and swift and contrary of current," while Gabriel Josipovici described him, "despite reservations about some of his recent work," as one of the most significant German-language writers of the post-war era. W. G. Sebald was inspired by Handke's intricate prose. In an essay on Repetition, he wrote about "a great and, as I have since learned, lasting impression" the book made on him. "I don’t know," he lauded, "if the forced relation between hard drudgery and airy magic, particularly significant for the literary art, has ever been more beautifully documented than in the pages of Repetition." Karl Ove Knausgård described A Sorrow Beyond Dreams as one of the "most important books written in German in our time." The book and its author were also praised in Knausgård's My Struggle.

== Controversies ==
In 1996, Handke's travelogue Eine winterliche Reise zu den Flüssen Donau, Save, Morawa und Drina oder Gerechtigkeit für Serbien (published in English as A Journey to the Rivers: Justice for Serbia) created controversy, as Handke portrayed Serbia as being among the victims of the Yugoslav Wars. In the same essay, Handke also criticised Western media for misrepresenting the causes and consequences of the war.

Sebastian Hammelehle wrote that Handke's view of the Yugoslav Wars, which has provoked numerous controversies, was probably romanticized, but that it represented the view of a writer, not a war reporter. The American translator Scott Abbott, who travelled with Handke through Yugoslavia after which numerous essays were published, stated that Handke considered Yugoslavia as the "incredible, rich multicultural state that lacked the kind of nationalisms that he saw in Germany and Austria". Abbott added that Handke viewed the disintegration of country as the disappearance of utopia. Reviewing The Moravian Night, Joshua Cohen stated that Handke's Yugoslavia was not a country, but a symbol of himself, a symbol of literature or the "European Novel". Volker Hage wrote that The Moravian Night is "extremely cosmopolitan" and connected to the present, while also that the book represents the autobiographical summary of Handke's life as a writer. Tanjil Rashid noted that "Handke’s novels, plays and memoirs demonstrate the evil of banality".

After his play Voyage by Dugout was staged in 1999, Handke was condemned by other writers: Susan Sontag proclaimed Handke to be "finished" in New York. Salman Rushdie declared him as a candidate for "International Moron of the Year" due to his "idiocies", while Alain Finkielkraut said that he was an "ideological monster", and Slavoj Žižek stated that his "glorification of the Serbs is cynicism". When Handke was awarded the International Ibsen Award in 2014, the Norwegian author Øyvind Berg called for the jury to resign.

However, disputing such interpretations of his work as listed above as misinterpreted by the English press, Handke has described the Srebrenica massacre as an "infernal vengeance, eternal shame for the Bosnian Serbs responsible." This concern about the imprecision and political nature of language, carries through Handke's view. In a 2006 interview, Handke commented on concerns about the stereotyped language of the media that "knew everything", endlessly recycling words like "the butcher of Belgrade".

Handke’s literary fame was overshadowed in 2006 by his politics. The writer’s public support of Slobodan Milošević, the former president of Yugoslavia who died that year while on trial for genocide and war crimes, caused controversy after Handke spoke at his funeral. Because of this the administrator of the theatre Comédie-Française, Marcel Bozonnet, removed Handke's play "Voyage au pays sonore ou L'art de la question" from the forthcoming 2007 schedule. This event once again drew both supportive and critical voices. Renaud Donnedieu de Vabres, the French minister of culture, implicitly criticized Bozonnet's action in a letter addressed to him, and by deciding to invite Handke to the ministry. A petition against the censorship of his work was signed by Emir Kusturica, Patrick Modiano (winner of the Nobel Prize for Literature in 2014), Paul Nizon, Bulle Ogier, Luc Bondy and Handke’s compatriot Elfriede Jelinek (winner of the Nobel Prize for Literature in 2004). Handke was subsequently selected to receive that year’s Heinrich Heine Prize, though he refused it before it was to be revoked from him.

In 2013, Tomislav Nikolić, as the President of Serbia, expressed gratitude saying that some people still remember those who suffered for Christianity, implying that Handke was a victim of scorn for his views, to which Handke replied with an explanation, "I was not anyone's victim, the Serbian people is victim." This was said during the ceremony at which Handke received the Gold Medal of Merit of the Republic of Serbia.

In February 2020, Handke was decorated with the Order of Karađorđe's Star for "special merits in representing Serbia and its citizens" as he "wholeheartedly defended the Serbian truth". The current President of Serbia Aleksandar Vučić presented recipients on the occasion of the Serbian Statehood Day.

=== Reactions to the Nobel Prize ===
In 2019, The Intercept published a series of articles by war correspondent Peter Maass, who had covered the Bosnia War for The Washington Post. He criticized the Swedish Academy for awarding Handke the Nobel Prize. In another article by Intercept, Maass went to great lengths accusing Handke of being an "exponent of white nationalism". Subsequently in an interview conducted by Maass in December 2019, asking Handke whether the 1995 Srebrenica massacre had happened, Handke responded: “I prefer waste paper, an anonymous letter with waste paper inside, to your empty and ignorant questions.” Maass also contends that two Nobel Prize jurors were adhering to "conspiracy theories" with regard to American involvement in the Yugoslav conflicts, and that the jurors were "misinformed" about Handke's literary achievements.

Handke received countless mails that included threats, or unsanitary content. Germany's Eugen Ruge also protested against the scale of the criticism. In November, around 120 authors, literary scholars, translators and artists expressed their unease in an open letter. They felt that the criticism against Handke was no longer rational.

== Awards ==
- 1973: Georg Büchner Prize
- 1987: Vilenica International Literary Prize
- 2000: Brothers Karić Award
- 2002: America Award
- 2002: Honorary Doctor, University of Klagenfurt
- 2003: Honorary Doctor, University of Salzburg
- 2008: Thomas-Mann-Preis
- 2009: Franz Kafka Prize
- 2012: Mülheimer Dramatikerpreis
- 2014: International Ibsen Award
- 2018: Nestroy Theatre Prize for Lifetime Achievement
- 2019: Nobel Prize in Literature
- 2020: Order of Karađorđe's Star
- 2021: Order of the Republika Srpska
- 2024: Grand Decoration of Honour in Gold with Sash for Services to the Republic of Austria

== Works ==
Handke has written novels, plays, screenplays, essays and poems, often published by Suhrkamp. Many works were translated into English. His works are held by the German National Library, including:

=== Prose fiction ===
- 1966 Die Hornissen (The Hornets), novel
- 1970 Die Angst des Tormanns beim Elfmeter (The Goalie's Anxiety at the Penalty Kick), novel and screenplay of the film The Goalkeeper's Fear of the Penalty (1972)
- 1972 Der kurze Brief zum langen Abschied (Short Letter, Long Farewell), novel
- 1972 Wunschloses Unglück (A Sorrow Beyond Dreams: A Life Story), memoir
- 1975 Die Stunde der wahren Empfindung (A Moment of True Feeling), novel
- 1976 Die linkshändige Frau (The Left-Handed Woman)
- 1979 Langsame Heimkehr (Slow Homecoming), start of a tetralogy of stories, including Die Lehre der Sainte-Victoire (1980), Über die Dörfer and Kindergeschichte (1981)
- 1983 Der Chinese des Schmerzes (Across), story
- 1986 Die Wiederholung (Repetition), novel
- 1987 Nachmittag eines Schriftstellers (The Afternoon of a Writer)
- 1987 Die Abswesenhait (The Absence)
- 1994 Mein Jahr in der Niemandsbucht. Ein Märchen aus den neuen Zeiten (My Year in the No-Man's-Bay), novel
- 1997 In einer dunklen Nacht ging ich aus meinem stillen Haus (On a Dark Night I Left My Silent House)
- 2002 Der Bildverlust oder Durch die Sierra de Gredos (Crossing the Sierra de Gredos), novel
- 2004 Don Juan (erzählt von ihm selbst) (Don Juan: His Own Version)
- 2008 Die morawische Nacht (The Moravian Night), novel
- 2009 Bis dass der Tag euch scheidet oder Eine Frage des Lichts: ein Monolog (Till Day You Do Part or A Question of Light)
- 2010 Immer noch Sturm (Storm Still)
- 2011 Der Große Fall (The Great Fall)
- 2017 Die Obstdiebin oder Einfache Fahrt ins Landesinnere (The Fruit Thief or One-Way Journey into the Interior)
- 2020 Das zweite Schwert (The Second Sword)
- 2021 Mein Tag im anderen Land (My Day in the Other Land)
- 2023 Die Ballade des letzten Gastes (The Ballad of the Last Guest)

=== Plays ===
- 1966 Publikumsbeschimpfung und andere Sprechstücke (Offending the Audience and Other Spoken Plays), play, English version as Offending the Audience and Self-accusation
- 1967 Kaspar, play, English version also as Kaspar and Other Plays
- 1973 Die Unvernünftigen sterben aus, play
- 1990 Das Wintermärchen, William Shakespeare, German translation by Peter Handke. Première Schaubühne Berlin (1990)
- 1992 Die Stunde, da wir nichts voneinander wußten (The Hour We Knew Nothing of Each Other), play
- 2010 Immer noch Sturm (Storm Still), a play about the Slovenian uprising against Hitler in 1945, ISBN 978-3-518-42131-4; first performance: Salzburg Festival 2011
- 2018 Peter Handke Bibliothek. I. Prose, Poetry, Plays (Vol. 1–9), ISBN 978-3-518-42781-1; II. Essays (Vol. 10–11), ISBN 978-3-518-42782-8; III Diaries (Vol. 13–14), ISBN 978-3-518-42783-5
- 2021 Handke, Peter; Winston, Krishna (2022). The fruit thief, or, One-way journey into the interior. New York. ISBN 978-0-374-90650-4. OCLC 1276901930.

=== Poetry ===
- 1969 Die Innenwelt der Aussenwelt der Innerwelt (The Innerworld of the Outerworld of the Innerworld)
- 1974 Als das Wünschen noch geholfen hat (Nonsense and Happiness)

=== Films ===
- 1971 Chronik der laufenden Ereignisse (Chronicle of Current Events)
- 1977 Die linkshändige Frau (The Left-Handed Woman), after his 1976 novel
- 1985 Das Mal des Todes (The Malady of Death), after Marguerite Duras' 1982 novella
- 1992 L'Absence (The Absence)

=== Screenplays ===
- 1969 3 amerikanische LP's (3 American LPs), film by Wim Wenders
- 1972 Die Angst des Tormanns beim Elfmeter (The Goalie's Anxiety at the Penalty Kick), film by Wim Wenders
- 1975 Falsche Bewegung (Wrong Move), film by Wim Wenders
- 1987 Der Himmel über Berlin (Wings of Desire), film by Wim Wenders

== See also ==
- List of Austrian writers
