= Road Movie trilogy =

Three 1974–1976 films by Wim Wenders

Road Movie Trilogy
- The Criterion Collection DVD cover
- Directed by: Wim Wenders
- Screenplay by: Wim Wenders (Alice in the Cities, Kings of the Road); Veith von Fürstenberg (Alice in the Cities); Peter Handke (The Wrong Move)
- Starring: Rüdiger Vogler
- Cinematography: Robby Müller
- Edited by: Peter Przygodda
- Distributed by: Axiom Films (UK and Ireland)
- Release dates: 17 May 1974 (Alice in the Cities); 14 March 1975 (The Wrong Move); 4 March 1976 (Kings of the Road)
- Country: West Germany
- Languages: German; English

The Road Movie Trilogy (also known as The Road Trilogy) is a series of three road movies directed by German film director Wim Wenders in the mid-1970s: Alice in the Cities (1974), The Wrong Move (1975), and Kings of the Road (1976). All three films were shot by cinematographer Robby Müller and mostly take place in West Germany. The centerpiece of the trilogy, The Wrong Move, was shot in colour whereas Alice in the Cities was in black and white 16 mm, and Kings of the Road was in black and white 35 mm film.

== Conception ==
Director Wim Wenders didn't conceive of the three films as a trilogy, and they were first labelled as one by U.S. critic Richard Roud. However, U.S. filmmaker Michael Almereyda wrote that "they are unified by shared themes, an exacting formal rigor, and the presence of Rüdiger Vogler". Almereyda remarked that Wenders' earliest feature films, Summer in the City (1970) and The Goalkeeper's Fear of the Penalty (1972), also involved "aimless journeys", but the Road Movie trilogy was distinct, as "travel not only propels the story but also absorbs and reshapes it". The films were made on small budgets, but with great mobility.

== Legacy ==
The three low-budget films in the trilogy established Wenders' and Müller's road movie style, which they later resurrected in bigger-budget color films such as Paris Texas (1984) and Until the End of the World (1991). The trilogy also introduced (in Alice in the Cities) the fictitious wandering character Philip Winter, who returns in three later Wenders films: Until the End of the World, Faraway, So Close! (1993), and Lisbon Story (1994) (Vogler's character in Kings of the Road is named Bruno Winter).

The Road Movie trilogy established Wenders' prominence in international cinema, and it has attained minor cult film status among Wenders and Müller fans. The style of aimless wandering in the trilogy influenced other directors, including American director Jim Jarmusch (Stranger Than Paradise), who worked with Wenders on The State of Things (1982).

A number of issues, such as rights issues concerning the soundtracks of the films, made the three Road Movie films difficult to find on video in the United States for many years. However, in 2016, The Criterion Collection released the films on DVD and Blu-ray as a box set titled Wim Wenders: The Road Trilogy.
