= Yella Rottländer =

German actress

Yella Rottländer (born 1964) is a German television and film actress as well as costume designer.

Rottländer is best known for her appearances in a number of Wim Wenders films, most notably for playing the 9-year-old Alice in his film Alice in the Cities (Alice in den Städten). She also appeared in his films The Scarlet Letter (Der scharlachrote Buchstabe) and Faraway, So Close! (In weiter Ferne, so nah!). She was Paulinchen in the 1976 German TV series Paul and Paulinchen. Her best known work in costumes was on Heimat 2.

She is married and has been a medical doctor since 2009. In 2014, she received a doctorate from the Technical University of Munich with a thesis on the use of 3D reconstructions in the treatment of atrial fibrillations. Rottländer is currently chief resident in internal medicine at a hospital in Switzerland.
