= 18th European Film Awards =

2005 film awards ceremony in Germany

- Date: December 3, 2005
- Site: Treptow Arena, Berlin, Germany
- Hosted by: Heino Ferch
- Organized by: European Film Academy

Highlights
- Best Picture: Hidden
- Best Direction: Michael Haneke; Hidden
- Best Actor: Daniel Auteuil; Hidden
- Best Actress: Julia Jentsch; Sophie Scholl – The Final Days
- Most awards: Hidden (5)
- Most nominations: Hidden (8)

Television coverage
- Channel: Arte

The 18th European Film Awards were presented on December 3, 2005 in Berlin, Germany. The winners were selected by the members of the European Film Academy.

== Winners and nominees ==
English title	Original title	Director(s)	Country
Best Film
Hidden	Caché	Michael Haneke	France, Austria, Germany, Italy
Brothers	Brødre	Susanne Bier	Denmark, United Kingdom, Sweden, Norway
Don't Come Knocking	—N/a	Wim Wenders	Germany
The Child	L'enfant	Luc and Jean-Pierre Dardenne	Belgium, France
My Summer of Love	—N/a	Pawel Pawlikowski	United Kingdom
Sophie Scholl – The Final Days	Sophie Scholl – Die letzten Tage	Marc Rothemund	Germany

Nominee	English title	Original title
Best Director
(Austria) Michael Haneke	Hidden	Caché
(Denmark) Susanne Bier	Brothers	Brødre
(Italy) Roberto Faenza	Come into the Light	Alla luce del sole
(Germany) Wim Wenders	Don't Come Knocking	—N/a
(Spain) Álex de la Iglesia	Ferpect Crime	Crimen Ferpecto
(Poland) Pawel Pawlikowski	My Summer of Love	—N/a
(Romania) Cristi Puiu	The Death of Mr. Lazarescu	Moartea Domnului Lazarescu

Nominee	English title	Original title
Best Screenwriter
(Palestine) Hany Abu-Assad (Netherlands) Bero Beyer	Paradise Now	الجنّة الآن
(Republic of Ireland) Mark O'Halloran	Adam & Paul	—N/a
(Denmark) Anders Thomas Jensen	Adam's Apples	Adams æbler
(Denmark) Anders Thomas Jensen	Brothers	Brødre
(Switzerland) Dani Levy (Germany) Holger Franke	Go for Zucker!	Alles auf Zucker!
(Austria) Michael Haneke	Hidden	Caché
(Romania) Cristi Puiu (Romania) Razvan Radulescu	The Death of Mr. Lazarescu	Moartea Domnului Lazarescu

Nominee	English title	Original title
Best Actor
(France) Daniel Auteuil	Hidden	Caché
(Denmark) Ulrich Thomsen	Brothers	Brødre
(Germany) Henry Hübchen	Go for Zucker!	Alles auf Zucker!
(France) Romain Duris	The Beat That My Heart Skipped	De battre mon cœur s'est arrêté
(Belgium) Jérémie Renier	The Child	L'enfant
(Germany) Ulrich Matthes	The Ninth Day	Der neunte tag

Nominee	English title	Original title
Best Actress
(Germany) Julia Jentsch	Sophie Scholl – The Final Days	Sophie Scholl – Die Letzten Tage
(France) Audrey Tautou	A Very Long Engagement	Un long dimanche de fiançailles
(Denmark) Connie Nielsen	Brothers	Brødre
(France) Juliette Binoche	Hidden	Caché
(United Kingdom) Judi Dench	Ladies in Lavender	—N/a
(United Kingdom) Maggie Smith	Ladies in Lavender	—N/a
(United Kingdom) Natalie Press	My Summer of Love	—N/a
(Italy) Sandra Ceccarelli	The Life That I Want	La vita che vorrei

English title	Original title	Director(s)	Country
European Discovery – FIPRESCI Award
Accused	Anklaget	Jacob Thuesen	Denmark
4	—N/a	Ilya Khrzhanovsky	Russia
Alice	—N/a	Marco Martins	Portugal
Stranger	Ono	Malgorzata Szumowska	Germany; Poland
When the Sea Rises	Quand la mer monte	Yolande Moreau and Gilles Porte	France; Belgium
Saimir	—N/a	Francesco Munzi	Italy
Uno	—N/a	Aksel Hennie	Norway

Nominee	English title	Original title
Best Cinematographer
(Germany) Franz Lustig	Don't Come Knocking	—N/a
(France) Bruno Delbonnel	A Very Long Engagement	Un long dimanche de fiançailles
(Hungary) Gyuda Pados	Fateless	Sorstalanság
(United Kingdom) Anthony Dod Mantle	Manderlay	—N/a
(Poland) Ryszard Lenczewski	My Summer of Love	—N/a

Nominee	English title	Original title
Best Editor
(Austria) Michael Hudecek (France) Nadine Muse	Hidden	Caché
(France) Hervé Schneid	A Very Long Engagement	Un long dimanche de fiançailles
(Germany) Peter Przygodda	Don't Come Knocking	—N/a

Nominee	English title	Original title
Best Production Designer
(France) Aline Bonetto	A Very Long Engagement	Un long dimanche de fiançailles
(United Kingdom) Peter Grant	Manderlay	—N/a
(Germany) Jana Karen	Sophie Scholl – The Final Days	Sophie Scholl – Die Letzten Tage

Nominee	English title	Original title
Best Composer
(United Kingdom) Rupert Gregson-Williams (Italy) Andrea Guerra	Hotel Rwanda	—N/a
(Sweden) Stefan Nilsson	As It Is in Heaven	Så som i himmelen
(Italy) Ennio Morricone	Fateless	Sorstalanság
(Sweden) Johan Söderqvist	Brothers	Brødre
(Norway) Joachim Holbek	Manderlay	—N/a
(France) Cryil Morin	The Syrian Bride	הכלה הסורית
