= Wrong Move =

1975 German road movie by Wim Wenders

- Theatrical release poster
- Directed by: Wim Wenders
- Screenplay by: Peter Handke
- Based on: Wilhelm Meister's Apprenticeship by Johann Wolfgang von Goethe
- Starring: Rüdiger Vogler; Hanna Schygulla; Marianne Hoppe; Nastassja Kinski; Hans Christian Blech; Peter Kern; Ivan Desny; Lisa Kreuzer
- Cinematography: Robby Müller
- Edited by: Peter Przygodda
- Music by: Jürgen Knieper
- Distributed by: Axiom Films (UK and Ireland)
- Release date: 1975
- Running time: 103 minutes
- Country: West Germany
- Language: German

Wrong Move (German: Falsche Bewegung – "False Movement") is a 1975 German road movie directed by Wim Wenders. This was the second part of Wenders' "Road Movie trilogy" which included Alice in the Cities (1974) and Kings of the Road (1976).

With long carefully composed shots characteristic of Wenders' work, the story follows the wanderings of an aspiring young writer, Wilhelm Meister, as he explores his native country, encounters its people and starts defining his vocation. His thoughts are occasionally presented in voice-over. The work is a rough adaption of Johann Wolfgang von Goethe's 1795–96 novel Wilhelm Meister's Apprenticeship, an early example of the Bildungsroman or novel of initiation.

In June 2026, Wenders said he would block future access to the film after years of appeals from actress Nastassja Kinski, who was filmed topless when she was 13.

== Plot ==
Aiming to be a writer, Wilhelm leaves his mother and girlfriend in his home town of Glückstadt in the flat far north of Germany and sets out for Bonn. Changing trains at Hamburg, he notices a beautiful actress, Therese, and obtains her phone number. In his compartment are an older man, Laertes, who sometimes communicates by playing a harmonica, and a teen acrobat, Mignon, who appears to be mute. The pair have no money, so Wilhelm pays their fare and puts them up in his cheap hotel, where Therese joins them. Bernhard, an awkward Austrian who wants to be a poet, befriends the four. He says he has a rich uncle with a castle on a peak overlooking the Rhine, but when the five turn up it is the wrong place. Despite their error the owner welcomes them, because their arrival prevented him shooting himself; he says they can stay as long as they like.

Tensions grow, for Wilhelm is not giving Therese the affection she wants, while Mignon signals her availability to him. Laertes disgusts Wilhelm by revealing his role in the Holocaust and his feeling guilt but not repentance. The owner of the castle then hangs himself, upon which the five leave hastily. Bernhard goes off alone, while Therese takes the other three to her small flat in Frankfurt, where the tensions grow worse. Leaving on his own, Wilhelm completes his symbolic journey by reaching one of the most southerly, highest and emptiest points in Germany, the summit of the Zugspitze.

== Cast ==
- Rüdiger Vogler as Wilhelm Meister
- Hans Christian Blech as Laertes
- Hanna Schygulla as Therese Farner
- Nastassja Kinski as Mignon (credited as Nastassja Nakszynski)
- Peter Kern as Bernhard Landau
- Ivan Desny as Schloss (manor house) owner
- Marianne Hoppe as Wilhelm's mother
- Lisa Kreuzer as Janine, Wilhelm's girl friend

== Production ==
=== Development ===
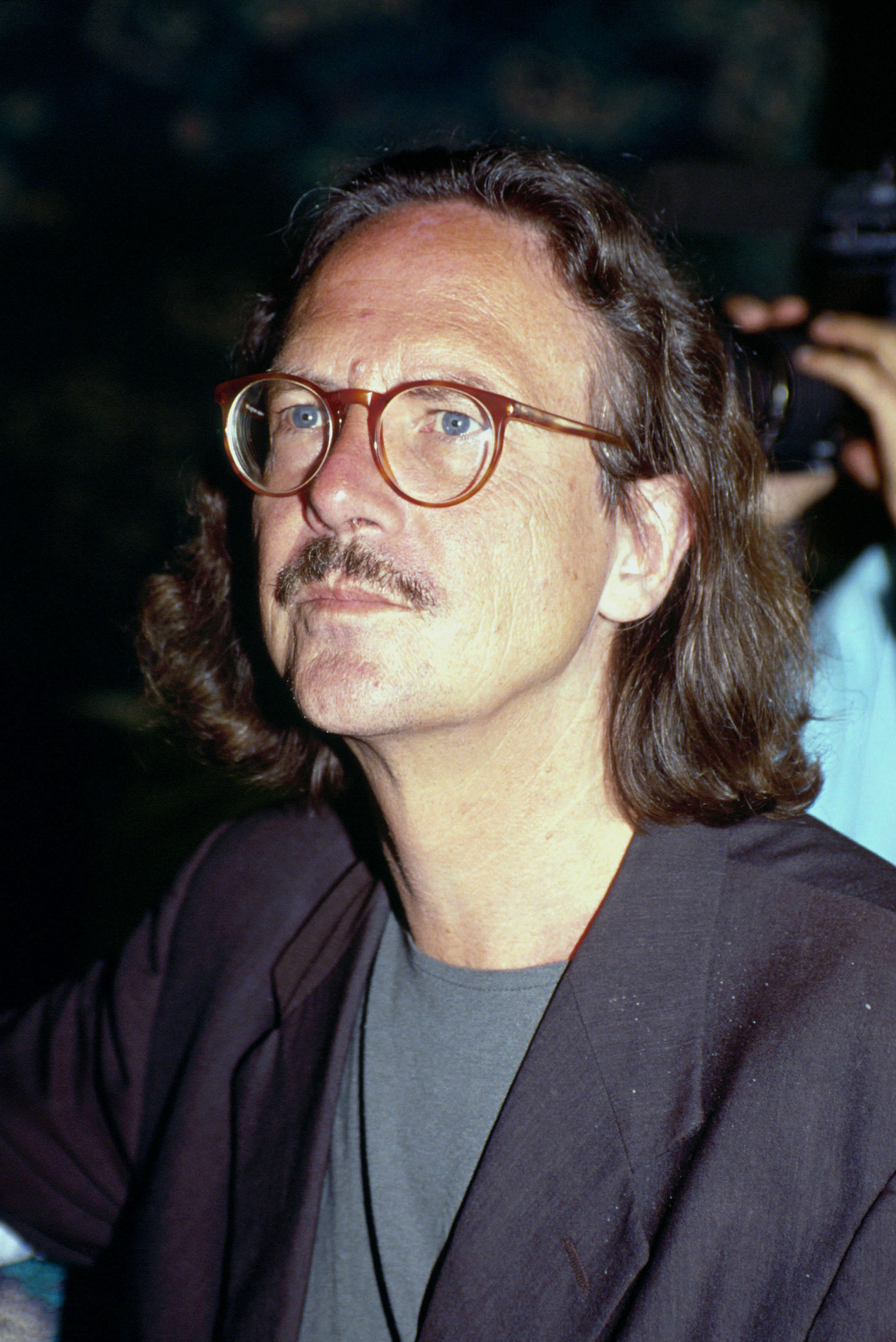
Author Peter Handke adapted Goethe's Wilhelm Meister's Apprenticeship for Wrong Move, marking his second collaboration with director Wim Wenders.

According to Wenders, although Wrong Move is based on Wilhelm Meister's Apprenticeship, screenwriter Peter Handke did not use any of the book's dialogue and incorporated a minimal amount of its action, mainly borrowing its concept of a young man "on a journey of self-realization". Wenders also toyed with the idea of whether such a journey would be a mistake, and hence Handke and Wenders made the film as a refutation of Goethe's novel and German Romanticism, in which their character suffers because of his travels. Wenders also said that Wrong Move is about how to be able to grasp the world through language.

Following The Goalkeeper's Fear of the Penalty (1972), Wrong Move was Wenders' second film collaboration with his friend Handke, who was already a respected author. Handke wrote the screenplay two years after his mother had killed herself, which had deeply affected him and influenced the story's dark tone.

=== Filming ===
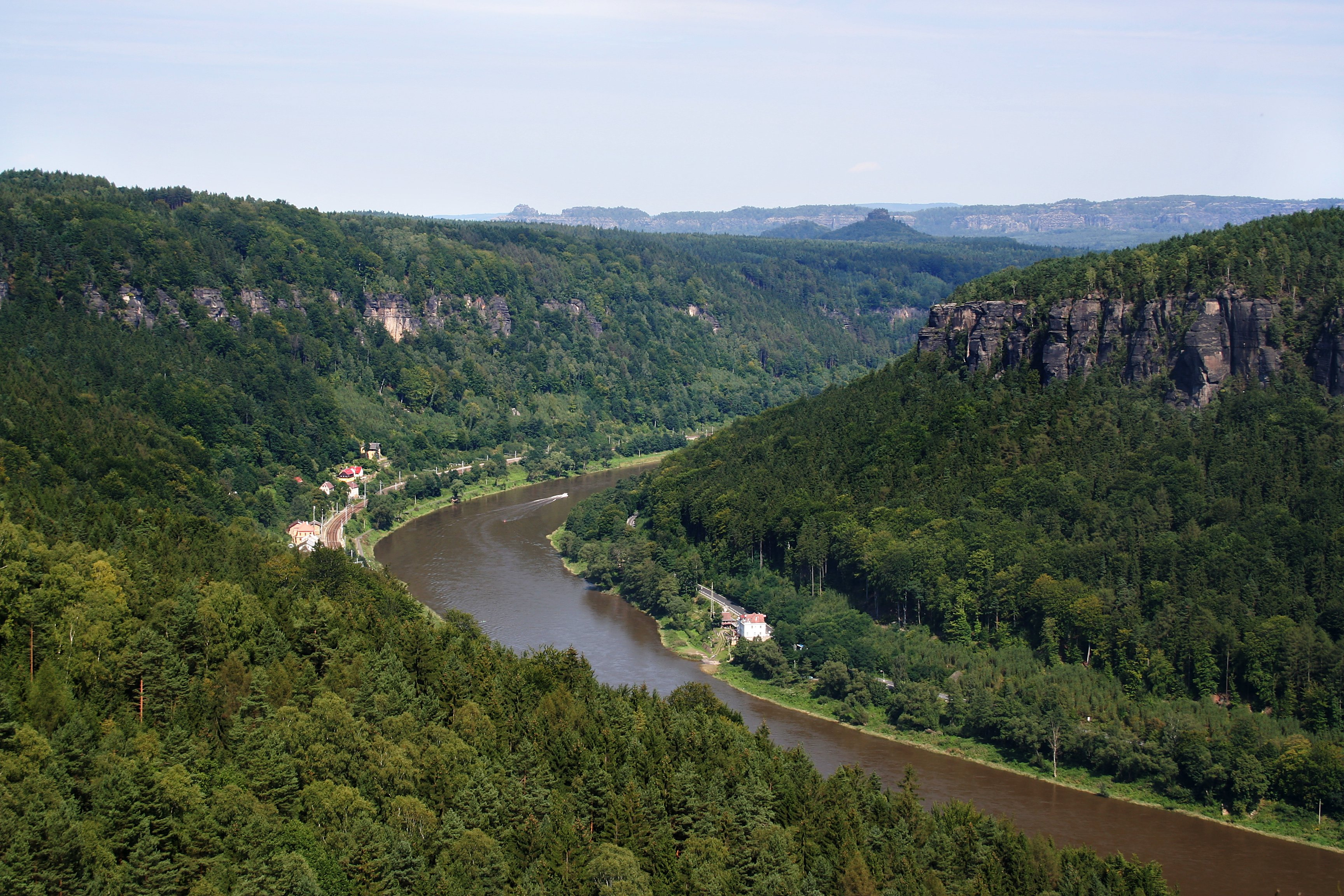
Filming took place over the Elbe River.

The film was shot over four weeks, including from a helicopter over the Elbe River. Landscape shots in the film were inspired by the 18th-century paintings of German artist Caspar David Friedrich.

The film marks the debut of Nastassja Kinski, whom Wenders' wife discovered in a disco in Munich. She appeared topless in Wrong Move, and was 13 years old at the time of filming. She later played one of the leading roles in Wenders' film Paris, Texas (1984), as well as appearing in his film Faraway, So Close (1993).

== Release ==
On its international release, the title Falsche Bewegung proved challenging to render in English. The literal meaning is "False Movement", but in the United Kingdom it was released as The Wrong Move, while in the United States, it was titled The Wrong Movement.

In 2016, The Criterion Collection released the film as Wrong Move on DVD and Blu-ray in Region 1. It was included with Alice in the Cities and Kings of the Road in the boxset Wim Wenders: The Road Trilogy.

In June 2026, director Wim Wenders decided to have the non-profit Wim Wenders Foundation, which holds the rights to the film, withdraw it from all current channels of distribution, due to the controversy of Nastassja Kinski appearing in a topless scene while she was 13 at the time of filming. This was following Kinski's interview with Süddeutsche Zeitung, in which Kinski said: "That was my first film, he was my first director and he didn't protect me. Even though I didn't know much at the age of 13, I knew that that was not OK." She said she had spent 15 years unsuccessfully trying to get Wenders to change the film. Wenders had previously said that while he would not shoot a scene in the same way today, Wrong Move was also a "product of its age", and editing it retrospectively would "require a broader discussion within the film industry". He said he had changed his mind soon after and released the following statement: "As the only person responsible at the time for Wrong Move who is still here, I recognize that Nastassja Kinski should have been better protected back then. For that, I apologize to you, Nastassja, unreservedly, no ifs or buts."

== Reception ==
=== Critical reception ===
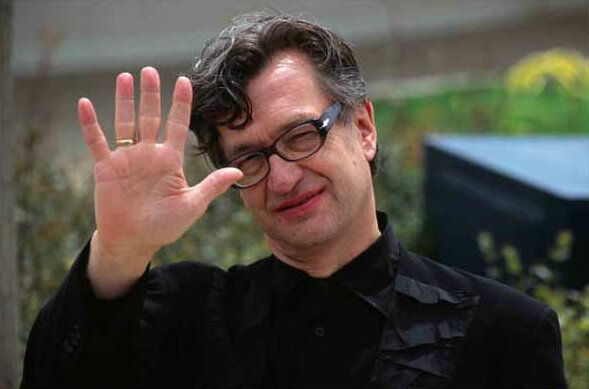
Filmmaker Wim Wenders received the German Film Award for Best Direction for Wrong Move.

In 2008, Chris Petit of The Guardian said initial reaction to Wrong Move was that "it felt talky and clotted, but now looks among the best of the work and much more considered than the popular Wings of Desire (1987)". Critic Richard Brody writes in The New Yorker that Wrong Move is one of Wenders' best films, calling it a virtual documentary of West German sights and moods. Dave Kehr, writing for the Chicago Reader, states that "it's Wenders's most dour film, and the grim tone takes its toll. There is, though, a solid and disturbing talent at work here". Jonathan Romney calls it "a film dense with philosophizing and speechifying, and the most thoroughly literary of all Wenders's films". TV Guide states that Wrong Move is "engaging" because of Wenders' direction, in spite of its emotional distance and unsympathetic characters.

Time Out wrote that Wrong Move was unusual for Wenders' filmography, finding fault in Handke's screenplay. Evaluating how it fitted into the "Road Movie trilogy", The A.V. Club asserts "it's unlikely that anyone saw Wenders' next film, Wrong Move, as any sort of sequel to Alice, spiritual or otherwise". The A.V. Club goes on to suggest that in being "far uglier and more depressive than the trilogy's bookends", it "perhaps serves as a necessary corrective to the other two films, suggesting as it does that there's no escaping one's own inner nature".

=== Accolades ===
Wrong Move competed for the Gold Hugo at the 1975 Chicago International Film Festival. It also won several honours at the German Film Awards, marking the first of two times Peter Kern won an acting award at the ceremony.

| Award | Date of ceremony | Category | Recipient(s) | Result | Ref(s) |
|---|---|---|---|---|---|
| German Film Awards | 27 June 1975 | Best Direction | Wim Wenders | Won | |
| German Film Awards | 27 June 1975 | Best Screenplay | Peter Handke | Won | |
| German Film Awards | 27 June 1975 | Best Ensemble Performance | Rüdiger Vogler, Hans Christian Blech, Hanna Schygulla, Nastassja Kinski, Peter Kern, Ivan Desny, Adolf Hansen, Marianne Hoppe, Lisa Kreuzer | Won | |
| German Film Awards | 27 June 1975 | Best Editing | Peter Przygodda | Won | |
| German Film Awards | 27 June 1975 | Best Music | Jürgen Knieper | Won | |
| German Film Awards | 27 June 1975 | Best Cinematography | Robby Müller | Won | |
