= Richard Reitinger =

German screenwriter (born 1951)

- Born: 1951 (age 74–75); Munich, West Germany
- Occupation: Screenwriter

Richard Reitinger (born 1951) is a German screenwriter. He is known for co-writing the 1987 film Wings of Desire with Peter Handke and director Wim Wenders. As Handke submitted writings for the project, Reitinger assisted Wenders in scripting scenes around Handke's contributions. Reitinger later reunited with Wenders to write the Wings of Desire sequel Faraway, So Close! with Ulrich Ziegler, with Reitinger and Ziegler responsible for the bulk of the screenplay. Faraway, So Close! went on to win the Grand Prix at the 1993 Cannes Film Festival.

Originally from Munich, Reitinger later resided in Kleinmachnow and worked as an art director at Hamburg Media School.

== Filmography ==
His films include:

- Wings of Desire (1987)
- The Match Factory Girl (1990) (actor)
- Faraway, So Close! (1993)
- City of Angels (1998) (based on Wings of Desire)
- SuperTex (2003)
