= Lisa Kreuzer =

German actress (born 1945)

- Born: Elisabeth Kreuzer; 2 December 1945 (age 80); Hof, Bavaria, Germany
- Occupation: Actress
- Spouse: Wim Wenders (m. 1974; div. 1978)

Lisa Kreuzer (born 2 December 1945) is a German television and film actress with credits for appearances in over 120 films and television series.

== Career ==
Kreuzer co-starred with Dennis Hopper and Bruno Ganz in Wim Wenders's film The American Friend (1977), a West German-French co-production. During the years that she and Wenders were married (1974 to 1978), she also appeared in his Road Movie trilogy: Alice in the Cities (1974), The Wrong Move (1975) and Kings of the Road (1976). She is also in Christopher Petit's Wenders-influenced Radio On (1979), which was shot in the UK and is predominantly in English. More recently, she is also known for her role as Claudia Tiedemann in Dark, the first German-language Netflix original series.

Kreuzer appeared in the German TV series Derrick from 1977 to 1990 on nearly a dozen occasions.

== Filmography ==
=== Films ===
- Alice in the Cities (1974), as Lisa, Alice's mother
- The Wrong Move (1975), as Janine
- Kampf um ein Kind (1975, TV film), as Maria Mandelstam
- By Hook or by Crook (1975), as Monika
- Kings of the Road (1976), as Pauline
- The American Friend (1977), as Marianne Zimmermann
- Radio On (1980), as Ingrid
- Birgitt Haas Must Be Killed (1981), as Birgitt Haas
- The Wounded Man (1983), as Elisabeth
- Cold Fever (1984), as Silvie
- A Man Like E.V.A. (1984), as Gudrun / Margueritte
- Among Wolves (1985), as Carla
- Berlin-Jérusalem (1989), as Else Lasker-Schüler
- No Mention of Violence (1991, TV film), as Erika Zielke
- Never Sleep Again (1992), as Rita
- Fähre in den Tod (1996, TV film), as Caroline
- Tails You Win, Heads You Lose (1999), as Maja's mother
- Der Schandfleck (1999, TV film), as Aloisia
- Nicht mit UN's (2000), as Babsi
- Gone Underground (2001, short film)
- Das sündige Mädchen (2001), as Mother
- Der Freund von früher (2002), as Katharina
- Love Crash (2002)
- Brush with Fate (2003, TV film), as old Magdalena
- The Visit (2008, TV film), as Angelika Ill
- The Murder Farm (2009), as Mrs. Danner
- Dreileben: Don't Follow Me Around (2011), as Jo's mother
- The Fifth Estate (2013), as East Berlin Woman
- The Grand Budapest Hotel (2014), as Grande Dame

=== Television series ===
- Lobster: Der Einarmige (1976, TV series episode), as Karin Schulke
- Derrick – Season 4, Episode 9: "Inkasso" (1977), as Lena
- Die Dämonen (1977, TV miniseries), as Marya Timofeevna Lebyadkina
- Derrick – Season 5, Episode 8: "Solo für Margarete" (1978), as Margarete Wenk
- Derrick – Season 6, Episode 4: "Ein unheimliches Haus" (1979), as Annie
- Derrick – Season 7, Episode 4: "Tödliche Sekunden" (1980), as Ina Dommberg
- Derrick – Season 7, Episode 13: "Eine Rechnung geht nicht auf" (1980), as Helene Moldau
- Exil (1981, TV miniseries), as Erna Redlich
- Derrick – Season 8, Episode 9: "Der Untermieter" (1981), as Gudrun Kaul
- Derrick – Season 10, Episode 5: "Die kleine Ahrens" (1983), as Vera
- Wagner (1983, TV miniseries), as Friederike Meyer
- Derrick – Season 12, Episode 3: "Raskos Kinder" (1985), as Evelyn Hausner
- Derrick – Season 12, Episode 7: "Ein unheimlicher Abgang" (1985), as Mrs. Meissner
- Lorentz & Söhne (1988), as Silvia Lorentz
- Tassilo (1991), as Mia von Mufflings
- Amico mio (1998), as Angela's Mother
- Ihr Auftrag, Pater Castell (2008–2009), as Franziska Blank
- Die Bergwacht (2009–2010), as Aunt Maria
- Dark (2017–2020, Netflix Original Series), as Claudia Tiedemann
- Becoming Karl Lagerfeld (2024, Disney + Original Series), as Elisabeth Lagerfeld
- Alle Jahre Wieder (2024)
