= Kings of the Road =

1976 West German film

- Directed by: Wim Wenders
- Written by: Wim Wenders
- Starring: Rüdiger Vogler; Hanns Zischler
- Cinematography: Robby Müller
- Edited by: Peter Przygodda
- Distributed by: Axiom Films (UK and Ireland)
- Release date: 1976
- Running time: 175 minutes
- Country: West Germany
- Language: German

Kings of the Road (German: Im Lauf der Zeit, "In The Course of Time") is a 1976 German road film directed by Wim Wenders. It was the third part of Wenders' "Road Movie trilogy" which included Alice in the Cities (1974) and The Wrong Move (1975). It was the unanimous winner of the FIPRESCI Prize at the 1976 Cannes Film Festival.

== Plot ==
Projection-equipment repair mechanic Bruno Winter meets depressed Robert Lander after the latter has driven his car into a river in a half-hearted suicide attempt following a break-up with his wife. Bruno allows Robert to ride with him while his clothes dry, rarely speaking while Bruno drives along the Western side of the East German border in a repair truck, servicing equipment at worn-out movie theaters.

While out on the road, Bruno and Robert encounter several people in various states of despair, including a man whose wife has committed suicide by driving her car into a tree. Robert also drops in on his elderly father to berate him for disrespecting Robert's mother. After Bruno and Robert have a minor brawl after a conversation about Robert and his wife, Robert finally leaves Bruno, though Bruno later spots him riding a train. Bruno continues his service calls to theatres, including one that no longer screens films because the owner regards modern films as exploitative.

== Cast ==
- Rüdiger Vogler as Bruno Winter
- Hanns Zischler as Robert Lander
- Lisa Kreuzer as Pauline, a cashier
- Rudolf Schündler as Robert's Father
- Marquard Bohm as Man Who Lost His Wife
- Hans Dieter Trayer as Paul, a garage owner (as Dieter Traier)
- Franziska Stömmer as Cinema owner
- Patric Kreuzer as Little boy
- Wim Wenders as Spectator at Pauline's Theater

== Production ==
The film contains many long shots without dialogue, including an outdoor defecation scene, and it was filmed in black and white by long-time Wenders collaborator Robby Müller.

Kings of the Road was shot in black and white, wide-screen (5:3) format, which is explicitly mentioned in the titles. Only the first scene of the film where Winter and Lander meet was scripted; everything else was improvised by the actors. Wim Wenders shot 49,000 m (161,000 ft) of film and the final cut was 4,760 m (15,620 ft). The camera used was an ARRI 35 BL. The negative material from Kodak (Plus-X and Four-X) copied to ORWO positive.

The songs that are played in Bruno's portable single-disc player are: "The More I See You" by Chris Montez, "Just Like Eddie" by Heinz, and "King of the Road" by Roger Miller.

Other songs on the soundtrack of the film were written and performed by the German krautrock group Improved Sound Limited.

The cost of production was DM 730,800 (then equivalent to US$315,000). The film was financed with a screenplay premium of the Federal Ministry of the Interior of DM 250,000.

In his documentary, White Walls director Mike Schlömer shot footage along the inner-German border between Lüneburg and Hof, where Wim Wenders shot footage.

It was the first film Wenders made through his new production company Road Movies Produktion. He shot it in black and white because he thought that it was much more realistic and natural than color.

== Reception ==
In Germany, the Lexicon of International Film wrote that "Wim Wenders' film combines the captivating clarity and epic serenity of a classic Bildungsroman with the mythic qualities of American genre film… Directed in a craftmansly, impeccable style, space itself allows for the unfolding of characters, thoughts and landscapes". Wolf Donner of Die Zeit said that "motions, sequences of confusingly beautiful and suggestive shots, highly poetic compositions and technical perfection make up the particular charm of this three-hour-long black-and-white film. [...] Scenes shot in a nocturnal mist, in the half-glow of the evening and morning, a profound depth of field, a variety of lenses, iridescent effects in the interaction of filters, natural and artificial light, long shots where entire landscapes seem illuminated: these formal qualities always simultaneously bring out the dual meaning of this itinerancy, the nowhereness of this trip, the between-space outside of ordinary reference to reality. The artisanly virtuosity of Kings of the Road will get cinephiles hooked".

Film Critic Derek Malcolm ranked Kings of the Road 89 on his list of his 100 favourite movies. Malcolm says that Wenders "achieves a palpable sense of time, place and atmosphere, and of how everybody is affected by their tiny spot in history". It has been compared to Easy Rider and Two-Lane Blacktop and called the ultimate road movie. Richard Combs wrote that "alienation is not really Wenders subject, although his lonely, self-obsessed heroes might suggest as much".

The film won the FIPRESCI Prize at the 1976 Cannes Film Festival and the Gold Hugo grand prize at the Chicago International Film Festival.

Richard Eder, writing in The New York Times, however, noted that while it had "a number of compelling and witty scenes," its length, nearly "three hours long" was "at least an hour too much."

== Home video ==
Kings of the Road was released in 1987 as a VHS tape and in 2008 as a region 2 DVD with English subtitles. In 2016, The Criterion Collection released the film in Region 1 on DVD and Blu-ray, along with Alice in the Cities and Wrong Move, as Wim Wenders: The Road Trilogy.
