= Notebook on Cities and Clothes =

- German: Aufzeichnungen zu Kleidern und Städten
- Directed by: Wim Wenders
- Written by: Wim Wenders; Francois Burkhardt (idea)
- Produced by: Ulrich Felsberg; Wim Wenders
- Starring: Yohji Yamamoto
- Cinematography: Masasai Chikamori; Muriel Edelstein; Uli Kudicke; Robby Müller; Musatocki Nakajima; Wim Wenders
- Edited by: Dominique Auvray; Lenie Saviette; Anne Schnee
- Music by: Laurent Petitgand
- Distributed by: Axiom Films (UK and Ireland)
- Release dates: 28 December 1989 (France); 29 March 1990 (West Germany)
- Running time: 81 minutes
- Countries: France, West Germany
- Languages: English, Japanese, French, German

Notebook on Cities and Clothes (German: Aufzeichnungen zu Kleidern und Städten) is a 1989 documentary film about Yohji Yamamoto directed by Wim Wenders. Despite Wender's previous disdain for fashion, he undertook filming after being commissioned by the Pompidou Center in Paris.

== Content ==
The film loosely centers on a series of interviews with Yamamoto, interspersed with footage of his atelier, previous work and his then upcoming show. Notably, Yamamoto's comments and philosophical musings lead Wenders to make his own comments about the nature of cities, identity, and the role of cinema in modern life.

== Cast ==
- Yohji Yamamoto as himself
