= SuperTex =

- Film poster
- Directed by: Jan Schütte
- Written by: Leon de Winter (novel); Andrew Kazamia; Richard Reitinger; Jan Schütte
- Starring: Stephen Mangan; Jan Decleir; Maureen Lipman; Victor Löw
- Music by: Zbigniew Preisner
- Distributed by: A-Film Distribution
- Release date: March 13, 2003
- Running time: 97 minutes
- Countries: Germany; Netherlands
- Language: English

SuperTex is a 2003 English-language Dutch film directed by Jan Schütte and starring Stephen Mangan, Jan Decleir, Maureen Lipman, and Victor Löw.

== Cast ==
- Stephen Mangan
- Jan Decleir
- Elliot Levey
- Tracy-Ann Oberman
