= Axiom Films =

International film distributor and producer

Axiom Films International Ltd
- Type: Film Distribution/Production
- Industry: Film distribution
- Founded: 1997; 29 years ago
- Founder: Douglas Cummins; Rocio Freire-Bernat
- Headquarters: London, United Kingdom
- Key people: Douglas Cummins (MD, Axiom Films International Ltd.); Rocio Freire-Bernat (Director of Acquisitions, Axiom Films International Ltd.
- Products: Film
- Website: axiomfilms.co.uk

Axiom Films International Ltd is an international film distributor and producer based in London.

Founded in 1997 by producer Douglas Cummins and partner Rocio Freire-Bernat, Axiom specialises in independent and world cinema, as well as documentary, filmed opera and dance.

Notable films under Axiom ownership include Half Nelson, for which actor Ryan Gosling was nominated for the Best Actor award at the 2007 Academy Awards, In a Better World, which won the Best Foreign Language Film at the 2011 Academy Awards, and the majority of Wim Wenders’s feature and documentary films.

Axiom is owned by UKI Investments and founders Douglas Cummins and Rocio Freire-Bernat, who also retain a controlling interest and act as managing director and director of acquisitions respectively. UKI is one of the largest privately owned investment companies in the United Kingdom, with interests in real estate, mining, agriculture, financial services and technology across a broad geographical footprint. Axiom distributes an average 10 theatrical releases and 20 DVD films each year, as well as online and digitally through LoveFilm, iTunes and FilmFlex.

== Films under UK and Irish ownership ==
Title	Directed by	Original Release Year	Country
About Elly	Asghar Farhadi	2009	Iran
À l'aventure	Jean-Claude Brisseau	2008	France
Alice in the Cities	Wim Wenders	1974	Germany
Any Way the Wind Blows	Tom Barman	2003	Belgium
The American Friend	Wim Wenders	1977	Germany
Atash / Thirst (English title)	Tawfik Abu Wael	2004	Israel/Palestine
Ballast	Lance Hammer	2008	USA
Blood and Rain	Jorge Navas	2009	Colombia/Argentina
Blue Eyelids	Ernesto Contreras	2007	Mexico
Born and Bred	Pablo Trapero	2006	Argentina
Brilliant Moon	Neten Chokling	2010	USA
Broken Lines	Sallie Aprahamian	2008	UK
Buena Vista Social Club	Wim Wenders	1999	Germany/USA/UK/France/Cuba
Carancho	Pablo Trapero	2010	Argentina
Chop Shop	Ramin Bahrani	2008	USA
Cold Weather	Aaron Katz	2011	USA
Juan	Kasper Holten	2010	Denmark
Dark Horse	Todd Solondz	2011	USA
De Bruit et de Fureur	Jean-Claude Brisseau	1988	France
Deliver Us from Evil	Ole Bornedal	2009	Denmark/Sweden/Norway
Don't Look Down	Eliseo Subiela	2008	Argentina/France
Ed Hardy: Tattoo the World	Emiko Emori	2010	USA
Easier with Practice	Kyle Patrick Alvarez	2009	USA
El Bola	Achero Mañas	2000	Spain
The Exterminating Angels	Jean-Claude Brisseau	2006	France
Familia Rodante	Pablo Trapero	2004	Argentina/Brazil/France/Germany/Spain/UK
Frozen River	Courtney Hunt	2008	USA
Goodbye Solo	Ramin Bahrani	2009	USA
Half Nelson	Ryan Fleck	2006	USA
Honeydripper	John Sayles	2007	USA
The Housemaid	Im Sang-soo	2010	South Korea
I Don't Want to Sleep Alone	Tsai Ming-liang	2007	Malaysia/Taiwan
In a Better World	Susanne Bier	2011	Denmark/Sweden
In the City of Sylvia	José Luis Guerín	2007	Spain
The Inner Life of Martin Frost	Paul Auster	2007	Spain/Portugal/France/USA
Kings of the Road	Wim Wenders	1976	West Germany
The Kreutzer Sonata	Bernard Rose	2008	USA
La Bohème	Robert Dornhelm	2008	Austria/Germany
Land of Plenty	Wim Wenders	2004	USA
Leap Year	Michael Rowe	2010	Mexico
Libero	Kim Rossi Stuart	2006	Italy
Life and Debt	Stephanie Black	2001	USA
Lion's Den	Pablo Trapero	2008	Argentina
Lisbon Story	Wim Wenders	1994	Germany/Portugal/France/Spain
The Living Wake	Sol Tryon	2007	USA
Lost Embrace	Daniel Burman	2005	Argentina/France/Italy/Spain
Louise-Michel	Gustave de Kervern, Benoît Delépine	2008	France
Mademoiselle Chambon	Stéphane Brizé	2009	France
Mammuth	Gustave de Kervern, Benoît Delépine	2010	France
Milarepa	Neten Chokling	2006	Bhutan
My Dog Tulip	Paul Fierlinger	2009	USA
Nightwatching	Peter Greenaway	2007	Canada/France/Germany/Poland/Netherlands/UK/USA
Notebook on Cities and Clothes	Wim Wenders	1990	West Germany/France
Off the Black	Jame Ponsoldt	2006	USA
One Who Set Forth	Marcel Wehn	2008	Germany
Paris, Texas	Wim Wenders	1984	West Germany/France/UK/USA
Passenger Side	Matt Bissonnette	2009	Canada
Q	Laurent Bouhnik	2011	France
Return to Gorée	Pierre-Yves Borgeaud	2007	Luxembourg/Senegal/Swaziland
Room 666	Wim Wenders	1982	France/West Germany
Side by Side	Christopher Kenneally	2012	USA
The Sea Wall	Rithy Panh	2009	France/Cambodia/Belgium
Spanking the Monkey	David O. Russell	1994	USA
The State of Things	Wim Wenders	1982	West Germany/Portugal/USA
Sugar	Anna Boden, Ryan Fleck	2008	USA
Tony Takitani	Jun Ichikawa	2005	Japan
Tokyo-Ga	Wim Wenders	1985	USA/West Germany
Tosca	Benoît Jacquot	2001	Italy/France/UK/Germany
Un Jeu Brutal	Jean-Claude Brisseau	1983	France
Undertow	Javier Fuentes-León	2009	Peru
Uniform	Diao Yi'nan	2003	China/Hong Kong
Vampires	Vincent Lannoo	2010	Belgium
The Wayward Cloud	Tsai Ming-liang	2005	France/Taiwan
Who Loves the Sun	Matt Bissonnette	2006	Canada
Why We Fight	Eugene Jarecki	2005	Canada/France/UK/USA
Wings of Desire	Wim Wenders	1987	West Germany/France
Wrong Move	Wim Wenders	1987	West Germany
