= Rüdiger Vogler =

German film and stage actor (born 1942)

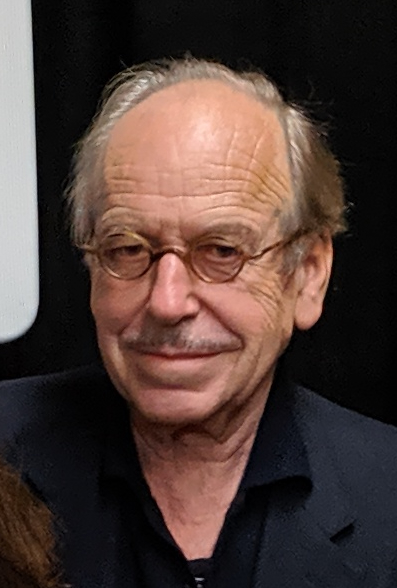
- Rüdiger Vogler in 2019
- Born: 14 May 1942 (age 83); Warthausen, Germany
- Occupation: Actor
- Years active: 1971–present
- Known for: Collaboration with Wim Wenders

Rüdiger Vogler (born 14 May 1942 in Warthausen, near Biberach an der Riß) is a German film and stage actor.

== Biography ==
Rüdiger Vogler attended acting school in Heidelberg from 1963 to 1965. Later he played for six years at Theater am Turm in Frankfurt am Main, often in the plays by Peter Handke.

His film debut was in 1971 in a TV film "Chronik der laufenden Ereignisse" ("Chronicle of Current Events") by Peter Handke. But Vogler's greater film career really started with The Goalkeeper's Fear of the Penalty (1972) and Alice in the Cities (1974), both directed by Wim Wenders. The creative partnership of Vogler and Wenders lasted for nearly 20 years. Rüdiger Vogler also played in various German TV series, such as Tatort, Derrick and Der Alte. Vogler lives in Paris and in Mittelbuch near Biberach an der Riß.

== Collaboration with Wim Wenders ==
Vogler is most often recognized for his collaboration with director Wim Wenders. In several of the films they made together, the last name of Vogler's character is Winter, although Winter's occupation—and, sometimes, first name—changes from film to film. Such films include Alice in the Cities, Kings of the Road, Until the End of the World, Faraway, So Close!, and Lisbon Story. The Wrong Move is the only Wenders film starring Rüdiger Vogler where Vogler's character has a different last name (Meister). Most of the Winter characters, as well as the Wilhelm character in The Wrong Move, are film technicians, including a writer (Alice in the Cities and The Wrong Move), a movie theater repairman (Kings of the Road), and a motion picture sound engineer (Lisbon Story).

== Selected filmography ==
- Chronik der laufenden Ereignisse (1971, TV film)
- The Goalkeeper's Fear of the Penalty (1972)
- The Scarlet Letter (1973)
- Alice in the Cities (1974)
- The Wrong Move (1975)
- Kings of the Road (1976)
- Group Portrait with a Lady (1977)
- Kreutzer (1978)
- The Savage State (1978)
- The Left-Handed Woman (1978)
- Letzte Liebe (1979)
- Marianne and Juliane (1981)
- The Logic of Emotion (1982)
- Man Without Memory (1984)
- The Practice of Love (1985)
- Tarot (1986)
- Väter und Söhne – Eine deutsche Tragödie (1986, TV miniseries)
- The Sun Also Shines at Night (1990)
- Transit (1991)
- Until the End of the World (1991)
- Princesse Alexandra (1992, TV film)
- Long Conversation with a Bird (1992)
- Faraway, So Close! (1993)
- Lisbon Story (1994)
- Les Milles (1995)
- Bombs Under Berlin (1999, TV film)
- Anatomy (2000)
- Colette, une femme libre (2004, TV Mini-Series)
- De Brief voor de Koning (2008)
- Effi Briest (2009)
- OSS 117: Lost in Rio (2009)
- A Film Unfinished (2010)
- Promising the Moon (2011)
- The Mark of the Angels – Miserere (2013)
- The Misplaced World (2015)
- Merkel: Anatomy of a Crisis (2020)
