= Sax and Violins =

Single by Talking Heads

from the album Until the End of the World: Music from the Motion Picture Soundtrack
- Released: December 1991
- Recorded: 1990
- Genre: Art pop; worldbeat
- Length: 5:18
- Label: Warner Bros.
- Songwriter: David Byrne

Talking Heads singles chronology
| "(Nothing But) Flowers" (1988) | "Sax and Violins" (1991) | "Lifetime Piling Up" (1992) |

"Sax and Violins" is a song by American rock band Talking Heads, written by David Byrne. It was first released on the soundtrack for the epic science fiction drama film Until the End of the World (1991), directed by Wim Wenders who also directed the music video for the song. The song was also released as a successful airplay single and charted at number one on the US Modern Rock Tracks chart. The title is a play on the phrase "sex and violence".

The music was an unused outtake from their 1988 album Naked, with new lyrics and vocals by frontman David Byrne. "Sax and Violins" was the final song released by Talking Heads before the band broke up.

The song was later released on the compilations Once in a Lifetime: The Best of Talking Heads and Sand in the Vaseline: Popular Favorites (both 1992). It was released again in 2005 as a bonus track on the remastered edition of Naked.

== Background ==
"The music was written during the rehearsals and recording that led to the Naked LP," recalled David Byrne in the liner notes of Once in a Lifetime: The Best of Talking Heads. "I wrote the words later for the opening scene of Wim Wenders' Until the End of the World. The movie is supposed to take place in the year 2000, so I spent a lot of time trying to imagine music of the near future: post-rock sludge with lyrics sponsored by Coke and Pepsi? Music created by machines with human shouts of agony and betrayal thrown in? Faux Appalachian ballads, the anti-tech wave? The same sounds and licks from the 60s and 70s regurgitated yet again by a new generation of samplers? The Milli Vanilli revival? Rappin' politicos… sell your soul to the beat, y'all? Well, it was daunting… so I figured, hell with it, I'd imagine Talking Heads doing a reunion LP in the year 2000, and them sounding just like they used to."

== See also ==
- Number one modern rock hits of 1992
