= The Left-Handed Woman =

1977 film

- Film poster
- Directed by: Peter Handke
- Written by: Peter Handke
- Produced by: Wim Wenders
- Starring: Edith Clever
- Cinematography: Robby Müller
- Edited by: Peter Przygodda
- Production company: Filmverlag der Autoren
- Distributed by: Filmverlag der Autoren
- Release date: 30 October 1977 (Hof Film Festival)
- Running time: 119 minutes
- Country: West Germany
- Language: German

The Left-Handed Woman (German: Die linkshändige Frau) is a 1977 West German drama film directed by Peter Handke. It was based on Handke's own novel. It was entered into the 1978 Cannes Film Festival.

== Cast ==
- Edith Clever as Marianne
- Bruno Ganz as Bruno
- Bernhard Minetti as The father
- Bernhard Wicki as The publisher
- Angela Winkler as Franziska
- Rüdiger Vogler as The actor
- Michael Lonsdale as The waiter
- Jany Holt as Woman in the meeting place
- Gérard Depardieu as Man with the T-shirt
