= Robby Müller =

Dutch cinematographer (1940–2018)

- Robby Müller
- Born: Robert Müller; 4 April 1940; Willemstad, Curaçao, Netherlands
- Died: 3 July 2018 (aged 78); Amsterdam, Netherlands
- Education: Netherlands Film Academy
- Occupation: Cinematographer
- Years active: 1965–2018
- Organizations: Netherlands Society of Cinematographers; German Society of Cinematographers
- Website: Robby Müller Archive

Robert Müller, NSC, BVK, (4 April 1940 – 3 July 2018) was a Dutch cinematographer. Known for his use of natural light and minimalist imagery, Müller first gained recognition for his contributions to West German cinema through his acclaimed collaborations with Wim Wenders.

Through the course of his career, he also worked closely with directors Jim Jarmusch, Peter Bogdanovich, Barbet Schroeder, and Lars Von Trier, the latter with whom he pioneered the use of digital cinematography. His work earned him numerous accolades and admiration from his peers. Among other accolades, he won three German Film Awards and was nominated for four Independent Spirit Awards.

== Life and career ==
Müller was born in Willemstad, Curaçao in 1940, and moved to Amsterdam in 1953. He attended grammar school in The Hague, and studied at the Netherlands Film Academy from 1962 to 1964. He worked as cinematographer on a number of shorts before collaborating with Wim Wenders on his first feature, Summer in the City (1970). They made many more films together, such as Alice in the Cities (1974), Kings of the Road (1976), The American Friend (1977) and Paris, Texas (1984).

Apart from the movies with Wenders, Müller contributed to both mainstream U.S. productions and independent films. His other work included Joan Micklin Silver's Finnegan Begin Again (1984), the hazy, yellow-tinted cinematography of William Friedkin's To Live and Die in LA (1985), Sally Potter's The Tango Lesson (1997), Dom Rotheroe's My Brother Tom (2001), Lars von Trier's starkly shot films Breaking the Waves (1996) and Dancer in the Dark (2000), and Jim Jarmusch's gritty-looking films Down by Law (1986), Mystery Train (1989), Dead Man (1995) and Ghost Dog: The Way of the Samurai (1999).

== Death ==
Müller died on 3 July 2018, aged 78, in Amsterdam. At the time, he suffered from vascular dementia for several years.

== Legacy ==
On 4 September 2018, the movie Living the Light - Robby Müller premiered at the Venice Film Festival. This documentary by Claire Pijman is a visual essay about the life and work of Robby Müller. On 4 October 2019, the documentary was awarded a Golden Calf for Best Long Documentary at the Netherlands Film Festival.

The Netherlands Society of Cinematographers has presented an annual 'Robby Müller Award' since 2020. Recipients of the prize include Kelly Reichardt and Sayombhu Mukdeeprom.

== Filmography ==
Year	Title	Director	Notes
1970	Summer in the City	Wim Wenders	
1970	Jonathan	Hans W. Geißendörfer	
1971	Carlos	Hans W. Geißendörfer	
1971	Die Angst des Tormanns beim Elfmeter	Wim Wenders	
1973	The Scarlet Letter	Wim Wenders	
1973	Trip to Vienna	Edgar Reitz	
1974	Alice in the Cities	Wim Wenders	
1974	Perahim – die zweite Chance	Hans W. Geißendörfer	
1974	Ein bißchen Liebe	Veith von Fürstenberg	
1975	The Wrong Move	Wim Wenders	
1976	Kings of the Road	Wim Wenders	
1976	Die Wildente	Hans W. Geißendörfer	
1976	Calm Prevails Over the Country	Peter Lilienthal	
1977	The American Friend	Wim Wenders	
1977	The Left-Handed Woman	Peter Handke	
1978	The Glass Cell	Hans W. Geißendörfer	
1978	Mysteries	Paul de Lussanet	
1979	In for Treatment	Marja Kok; Erik van Zuylen	
1979	Saint Jack	Peter Bogdanovich	
1980	Honeysuckle Rose	Jerry Schatzberg	
1981	They All Laughed	Peter Bogdanovich	
1982	Een zwoele zomeravond	Shireen Strooker; Frans Weisz	
1983	Un dimanche de flic	Michel Vianey	
1983	Class Enemy	Peter Stein	
1983	Les îles	Iradj Azimi	
1984	Repo Man	Alex Cox	
1984	Paris, Texas	Wim Wenders	
1984	Finnegan Begin Again	Joan Micklin Silver	HBO TV movie with Robert Preston, Mary Tyler Moore, and Sylvia Sidney
1984	Body Rock	Marcelo Epstein	
1984	Cheaters (Tricheurs)	Barbet Schroeder	
1985	To Live and Die in L.A.	William Friedkin	
1986	The Longshot	Paul Bartel	
1986	Down by Law	Jim Jarmusch	
1987	Barfly	Barbet Schroeder	
1987	The Believers	John Schlesinger	
1988	The Little Devil	Roberto Benigni	
1989	Mystery Train	Jim Jarmusch	
1989	Notebook on Cities and Clothes	Wim Wenders	Documentary film
1990	Korczak	Andrzej Wajda	
1991	Until the End of the World	Wim Wenders	
1993	Mad Dog and Glory	John McNaughton	
1993	When Pigs Fly	Sara Driver	
1995	Beyond the Clouds	Michelangelo Antonioni; Wim Wenders	
1995	Dead Man	Jim Jarmusch	
1995	Last Call	Frans Weisz	
1996	Breaking the Waves	Lars von Trier	
1997	The Tango Lesson	Sally Potter	
1998	Shattered Image	Raúl Ruiz	
1999	Ghost Dog: The Way of the Samurai	Jim Jarmusch	
2000	Dancer in the Dark	Lars von Trier	
2001	My Brother Tom	Dom Rotheroe	
2002	24 Hour Party People	Michael Winterbottom	
2003	Coffee and Cigarettes	Jim Jarmusch	Short film compilation

== Awards and nominations ==
Year	Title	Award/Nomination
1975	The Wrong Move	German Film Award for Best Cinematography
1977	The American Friend	Nominated - NSFC Award for Best Cinematography
1983	Class Enemy	German Film Award for Best Cinematography
1984	Paris, Texas	Bavarian Film Award for Best Cinematography; German Camera Award for Best Feature Film
1986	Down by Law	Nominated - Independent Spirit Award for Best Cinematography; Nominated - NSFC Award for Best Cinematography
1987	Barfly	Nominated - Independent Spirit Award for Best Cinematography
1989	Mystery Train	Nominated - Independent Spirit Award for Best Cinematography
1990	Korczak	German Film Award for Best Cinematography
1995	Dead Man	NSFC Award for Best Cinematography; NYFCC Award for Best Cinematographer; Nominated - CFCA Award for Best Cinematography; Nominated - Independent Spirit Award for Best Cinematography
1996	Breaking the Waves	NSFC Award for Best Cinematography; NYCC Award for Best Cinematographer; Robert Award for Best Cinematography; Camerimage Best Independent Duo; Nominated - Satellite Award for Best Cinematography; Nominated - Camerimage Golden Frog Award; Nominated - BSFC Award for Best Cinematography
2000	Dancer in the Dark	Nominated - Robert Award for Best Cinematography
