= Summer in the City (film) =

- Directed by: Wim Wenders
- Written by: Wim Wenders
- Produced by: Wim Wenders; Hochschule für Fernsehen und Film München (HFF)
- Starring: Hanns Zischler
- Cinematography: Robby Müller
- Edited by: Peter Przygodda
- Release date: 1970
- Running time: 125 minutes
- Language: German

Summer in the City is the first full-length feature film by director Wim Wenders, released in 1970 and starring Hanns Zischler.

Wenders' first full-length film was produced as his graduation project at the University of Television and Film Munich ("Hochschule für Fernsehen und Film München") which he attended from 1967 to 1970. Shot in 16 mm black and white by long-time Wenders collaborator Robby Müller, the movie exhibited many of Wenders' later trademark themes of aimless searching, running from invisible demons, and persistent wandering toward an indeterminate goal.

According to Wenders, the title of the film relates to the song from the band The Lovin' Spoonful, which was also included in the film, although a painting by Edward Hopper may have influenced Wenders as well. Wenders, an admirer of both The Lovin' Spoonful and Hopper, has included references to them in several of his films.

== Plot ==
The film narrates the journey of protagonist Hans (Zischler) after he is released from prison. Searching through seedy West German streets and bars, he finally winds up visiting an old friend in Berlin.
