= Alice in the Cities =

1974 film

- Promotional poster
- Directed by: Wim Wenders
- Written by: Wim Wenders; Veith von Fürstenberg
- Produced by: Joachim von Mengershausen
- Starring: Rüdiger Vogler; Yella Rottländer
- Cinematography: Robby Müller
- Edited by: Peter Przygodda; Barbara von Weitershausen
- Music by: Can
- Distributed by: Axiom Films (UK/Ireland)
- Release date: 17 May 1974
- Running time: 110 minutes
- Country: West Germany
- Languages: German; English

Alice in the Cities (German: Alice in den Städten) is a 1974 German road movie directed by Wim Wenders. It is the first part of Wenders' "Road Movie trilogy", which also includes The Wrong Move (1975) and Kings of the Road (1976). The film was shot in black and white by Robby Müller, and contains several long scenes without dialogue.

In the film, a professional writer loses a job due to his inability to complete an assignment. When he tries to travel to Munich, a stranger entrusts her daughter to his care and then disappears, and the duo search for the girl's estranged grandmother, aided only by the girl's hazy memories. The film's theme has been said to foreshadow Wenders' later film Paris, Texas (1984).

== Plot ==
West German writer Philip Winter has missed his publisher's deadline for writing an article about the United States. So far, he has traveled a lot, but has not written anything substantial, as he has been unable to find inspiration either in what he has seen, or in the many Polaroid pictures he has taken of his trip. He attempts to book a flight from New York City to Munich, hoping he will figure out how to write the article once he is back home, but is told at the airport that there are no flights to Germany because of a strike by German airport ground crews. He meets a German woman, Lisa van Dam, and her young daughter, Alice, who are also trying to book a flight, and manages to get them all tickets on a plane to Amsterdam the next day. In the morning, Lisa leaves Alice in Philip's care while she attempts to deal with her emotionally fragile ex-boyfriend, leaving Philip a note in which she tells him to take Alice to Amsterdam, and that she will meet them there soon.

As Alice and Lisa lived in Amsterdam at one point, Alice speaks some Dutch, and she suggests showing Philip the city while they wait for Lisa's flight. Saddled with someone else's child and short on money, Philip begins to get irritated, cutting short the sightseeing trip and no longer finding Alice's constant demands for care very endearing. When they go to the airport to meet Lisa's flight and find out she is not on the plane, Philip intends to leave Alice to wait for her mother with the authorities while he continues his journey home, but she is upset and locks herself in a bathroom stall. Feeling sorry for the girl, Philip remembers she mentioned visiting a grandmother in Germany, and offers to take her there, but Alice does not remember where her grandmother lives. He reads Alice a list of city names, and "Wuppertal" seems to ring a bell, so they get on a bus.

Although Alice cannot remember her grandmother's name or address, she says she is sure she will recognize the right house when she sees it. After searching Wuppertal for two days using the Schwebebahn and a rented car, Alice realizes her grandmother does not actually live in the city. Fed up, Philip drops Alice off at the police station, and then tries to unwind at a Chuck Berry concert. When he returns to his hotel, Alice, having escaped from the police station, gets into his car and says she now knows where her grandmother lives. Philip is glad to see her again and drives away, while she tells him that, during her interview with the police, she remembered that she and her mother had been the ones who lived in Wuppertal, but her grandmother, whose name is Krüger, lived just a short train ride away. Alice also finally shows Philip a picture of her grandmother's house that she has in her purse.

Philip and Alice begin to search throughout the Ruhr area, and, miraculously, they eventually find the house in Alice's picture, but the current resident does not know Alice's grandmother. With no solution in sight, they go swimming, releasing their frustration by playfully shouting insults at one another. Now virtually broke, Philip decides to go to his parents, who live across the Rhine. On the ferry, a policeman from Wuppertal spots Philip and Alice and informs Philip that both Alice's grandmother and Lisa have been located. The policeman puts Alice on a train to meet Lisa in Munich, and, though Philip has no money for a ticket, Alice produces a 100-dollar bill from her purse so he can come along. En route, Alice and Philip ask each other what they will do in Munich; Philip says he will finish writing his article, while Alice just raises her eyebrows. They open the window of their train compartment and look forward together.

== Cast ==
- Rüdiger Vogler as Philip Winter
- Yella Rottländer as Alice van Dam
- Lisa Kreuzer as Lisa van Dam, Alice's mother
- Edda Köchl as Angela, Philip's ex-girlfriend in New York
- Ernest Boehm as Philip's editor in New York
- Sam Presti as the car dealer who buys Philip's car
- Lois Moran as the Pan Am booking agent at the airport in New York
- Didi Petrikat as the woman Philip and Alice meet at the swimming park
- Hans Hirschmüller as the Wuppertal police officer
- Sibylle Baier as the woman on the ferry
- Chuck Berry as himself (uncredited)
- Wim Wenders as the man by the jukebox in an American diner (uncredited)

== Production ==
External videos
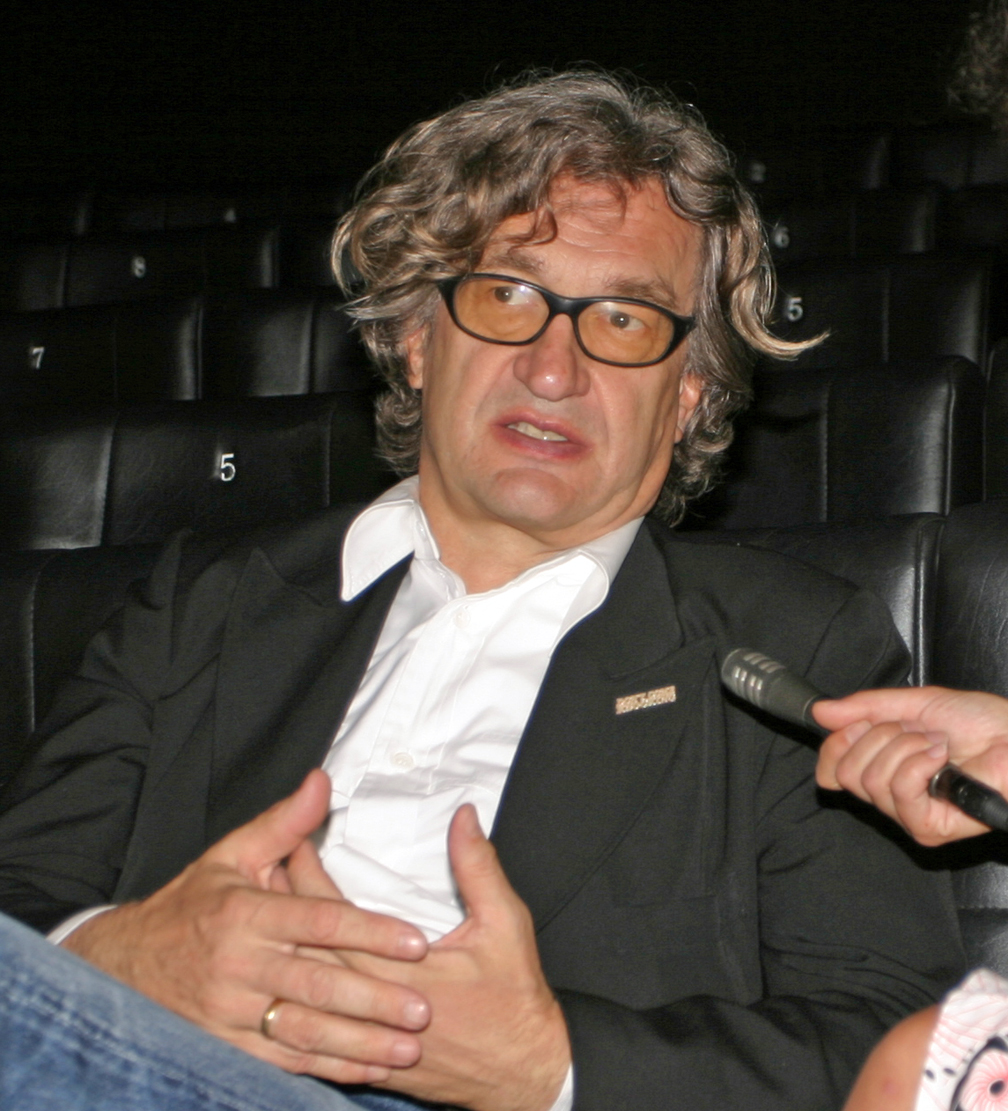
- Wim Wenders on Walker Evans, polaroids and road movies, 3:18, Museum of Modern Art

According to Wenders, Alice in the Cities, his fourth feature-length film, came at a major turning point when he was deciding whether to remain a filmmaker. He felt that his first two features were too heavily indebted to John Cassavetes and Alfred Hitchcock, while his third was an ill-advised adaptation of The Scarlet Letter. Alice in the Cities was a conscious attempt to make something only he could do.

The scenario of a young girl and a writer thrown together was inspired by Wenders' long-time collaborator Peter Handke's experience as a single parent. The influence of Handke's 1972 novel Short Letter, Long Farewell, also featuring an alienated German-speaker travelling across the United States, can be inferred from the film's use of clips from John Ford's Young Mr. Lincoln, which is heavily referenced in the novel. The film can be seen as a response to Handke's novel.

While Wenders was preparing Alice in the Cities, a friend took him to a screening of Peter Bogdanovich's new film, Paper Moon (1973). To his horror, the film was very similar to this own, prompting him to call his production office and break the news that he was canceling the project, as he believed the film they were about to shoot "had already been made". Soon after, Wenders went to see Samuel Fuller, who had invited him to come visit after a prior encounter in Germany. Wenders mentioned to Fuller that he had just cancelled a project, and, upon finding out that Wenders had already secured the financing for the film, Fuller convinced Wenders that it was a mistake. After a few hours of discussion, Wenders realized he could still proceed, albeit with some extensive rewrites to differentiate Alice in the Cities from Paper Moon, and he called his production office to tell them that the film was back on.

Wenders and Robby Müller had hoped to shoot the film in 35 mm with the Arri BL, which had just come out at the time, but it was too difficult to find one (a common problem with newly issued cameras). Given their budgetary limitations, they were left with no other option than to switch to 16 mm. Although they filmed with the 1.66:1 wide-screen format (a common European format at the time) in mind, even drawing it on the viewfinder, they had to provide a 4:3 full frame format of the film due to television broadcast demands, even though it was not their intended aspect ratio. This would create some problems in later years, before everything was rectified with the film's definitive restoration in 2014.

The film was shot in close-to-chronological order—beginning in North Carolina, proceeding to New York, continuing in Amsterdam, and finishing in Germany—throughout the summer of 1973. As filming progressed, the production grew more confident about improvising each scene. Some parts, like certain hotel scenes and almost anything filmed in a car, closely followed the script for logistical reasons, but, by the end of the film, Wenders said they virtually ignored the script altogether.

One of Wenders' inspirations for the story of the film was Chuck Berry's classic song "Memphis, Tennessee", in which a man is trying to re-connect with his daughter. When Wenders tried to include footage of Berry performing the song that he had shot in Frankfurt (presumably in late July 1973), Berry's camp demanded a clearance fee that he could not afford to pay. Instead, Wenders approached D.A. Pennebaker, who had filmed Berry's performance of the song at the 1969 Toronto Rock and Roll Revival, which Pennebaker had filmed for his documentary Sweet Toronto (1971). Although Wenders had to decolorize Pennebaker's footage to use it in the black-and-white Alice in the Cities, licensing it turned out to be a viable workaround, as it was substantially cheaper than clearing his own footage with Berry's camp.

=== Music ===
The film was scored by the German band Can. When interviewed about the experience, Can's Irmin Schmidt stated that it was recorded by him, Michael Karoli, and Jaki Liebezeit, and that they were not able to see the film before recording the music. Instead, Wenders, who was very short on time, told them the film's story and then let them know what would and would not work as they came up with ideas and recorded, all over the course of one session.

== Reception ==
Alice in the Cities won the Best Film award at the German Film Critics Association Awards.

Nora Sayre and Lawrence Van Gelder of The New York Times wrote in 1974 that the film has "a great deal to say about Europe and America, about the exhaustion of dreams and the homogenization of nations, about roots and the awareness of time, about sterility and creativity, about vicarious and real adventure and, eventually, about the possibilities of the future".

In 1988, Jonathan Rosenbaum hailed Alice in the Cities as one of Wenders' strongest works, calling it a pungent hybrid of European and American elements "with its effective broodings over American and German landscapes and their ambiguous photographic representations".

Writing in 2008, Philip French of The Observer called Rottländer's performance as Alice "unforgettable". He went on to say that the film would not be able to be made today, "partly because of the invention of the mobile phone, partly because of our obsessive fear of anything that might be interpreted as paedophilia".

In an essay included with The Criterion Collection's 2016 release of Wenders' "Road Trilogy" on home video, American director Allison Anders described Alice in the Cities as "one of my very favorite films, and a guiding light", and praised Alice as "one of the screen's most multifaceted child characters". In a review of the Criterion release, The A.V. Club described Alice as resembling "a genuine little kid", and praised the film's photography as "gorgeous".
