= Peter Przygodda =

German filmmaker and editor

- Born: 26 October 1941; Berlin, Germany
- Died: 2 October 2011 (aged 69); Munich, Germany
- Occupation: Film editor
- Years active: 1969–2011
- Notable work: Paris, Texas; Wings of Desire; Deathmaker; Palermo Shooting
- Awards: Deutscher Filmpreis

Peter Przygodda (26 October 1941 – 2 October 2011) was a German filmmaker, best known for editing Wim Wenders' films. Przygodda died of cancer, aged 69, in 2011.

== Filmography ==
=== Director ===
- 1969: Der Besuch auf dem Lande (short)
- 1972: Can
- 1979: … als Diesel geboren
- 1981–1985: Alle Geister kreisen… Todos os espiritos circulam

=== Editor ===
- 1969: The Brutes
- 1970: Summer in the City
- 1970: A Big Grey-Blue Bird
- 1971: Cream – Schwabing-Report
- 1971: Love Is as Beautiful as Love
- 1972: The Goalkeeper's Fear of the Penalty
- 1972: Ludwig: Requiem for a Virgin King
- 1973: The Scarlet Letter
- 1973: Sylvie
- 1974: Alice in the Cities
- 1974: Paul – Geschichte eines Ausgestoßenen
- 1974: Ein bißchen Liebe
- 1975: The Wrong Move
- 1975: The Lost Honour of Katharina Blum
- 1975: Teenager-Liebe
- 1976: The Sternstein Manor
- 1976: Kings of the Road
- 1977: The American Friend
- 1977: The Left-Handed Woman
- 1978: The Glass Cell
- 1978: Knife in the Head
- 1978: The Man in the Rushes
- 1980: Lightning Over Water
- 1980: Slow Attack
- 1982: The State of Things
- 1982: The Magic Mountain
- 1982: The Man on the Wall
- 1983: Joyride
- 1984: Fluchtpunkt Berlin
- 1984: Paris, Texas
- 1986: Miko: From the Gutter to the Stars
- 1987: Wings of Desire
- 1987: Deadline
- 1988: Linie 1
- 1989: Last Exit to Brooklyn
- 1991: Until the End of the World
- 1992: The Absence
- 1993: Faraway, So Close!
- 1994: Lisbon Story
- 1995: Transatlantis
- 1995: Beyond the Clouds
- 1995: Deathmaker
- 1995: A Trick of Light
- 1996: The Ogre
- 1996: Snakes and Ladders
- 1997: The End of Violence
- 1998: Palmetto
- 1998: Kopfleuchten
- 2000: Manila
- 2000: The Legend of Rita
- 2002: Tattoo
- 2005: Schneeland
- 2005: Don't Come Knocking
- 2006: Strike
- 2007: Eight Miles High
- 2008: Palermo Shooting
- 2009: Mazel Tov

== Awards ==
- 1975: Filmband in Gold (film editing): Falsche Bewegung
- 1978: Filmband in Gold (film editing): Der amerikanische Freund, Die linkshändige Frau und Die gläserne Zelle
- 2005: Nominated for European Film Award: Don't Come Knocking
- 2009: Nominated for Deutscher Filmpreis: Palermo Shooting
- 2010: Star on Boulevard der Stars in Berlin

== Literature ==
- Hans-Michael Bock: Peter Przygodda – Cutter, Regisseur. Essay von Karlheinz Oplustil in CineGraph – Lexikon zum deutschsprachigen Film, pg. 12 (September 1988)
- Kay Weniger: Das große Personenlexikon des Films. Sechster Band. Schwarzkopf & Schwarzkopf Verlag, Berlin 2001; ISBN 3-89602-340-3
