= Until the End of the World =

1991 film by Wim Wenders

- Theatrical release poster
- Directed by: Wim Wenders
- Screenplay by: Wim Wenders; Peter Carey
- Story by: Wim Wenders; Solveig Dommartin
- Produced by: Anatole Dauman; Jonathan Taplin
- Starring: William Hurt; Solveig Dommartin; Sam Neill; Max von Sydow; Rüdiger Vogler; Ernie Dingo; Jeanne Moreau
- Cinematography: Robby Müller
- Edited by: Peter Przygodda
- Music by: Graeme Revell
- Production companies: Road Movies Filmproduktion GmbH; Argos Films; Village Roadshow Pictures
- Distributed by: Tobis Film (Germany); Argos Films (France); Roadshow Films (Australia); Warner Bros. (United States)
- Release dates: 12 September 1991 (Germany); 23 October 1991 (France); 25 December 1991 (United States); 29 October 1992 (Australia)
- Running time: 158 minutes (United States); 179 minutes (Europe); 287 minutes (Director's Cut)
- Countries: Australia; Germany; France; United States
- Languages: English; French; German; Italian; Russian; Chinese; Japanese; Portuguese
- Budget: $23 million
- Box office: $752,856

Until the End of the World (German: Bis ans Ende der Welt; French: Jusqu'au bout du monde) is a 1991 epic science fiction drama film directed by Wim Wenders. Set at the turn of the millennium in the shadow of a world-changing catastrophe, the film follows a man and woman, played by William Hurt and Solveig Dommartin, as they are pursued across the globe, in a plot involving a device that can record visual experiences and visualize dreams.

An initial draft of the screenplay was written by American filmmaker Michael Almereyda, but the final screenplay is credited to Wenders and Australian novelist Peter Carey, from a story by Wenders and Dommartin. Wenders, whose career had been distinguished by his exploration of the road movie, intended this as the ultimate example of the genre.

The film has been released in several editions, ranging in length from 158 to 287 minutes.

== Plot ==
=== Act 1 ===
In 1999, panic ensues when an orbiting Indian nuclear satellite begins to spiral toward Earth. Claire Tourneur, who has been traveling around Europe trying unsuccessfully to distract herself after discovering that her boyfriend Eugene slept with her best friend, is unconcerned by the impending nuclear disaster though her sleep has been troubled by a recurring nightmare. When she gets stuck in a traffic jam in Southern France after it is projected as a possible impact site, she takes a side road and encounters a pair of friendly bank robbers who enlist her to carry their stolen cash to Paris in exchange for a cut of the loot. En route to Paris, Claire meets Trevor McPhee and agrees to let him travel with her to the city to escape an armed man named Burt who is following him. After parting ways in Paris, Claire discovers Trevor took some of the stolen money while she slept.

Claire crosses paths with Burt and finds out that he is going to Berlin. She makes the trip as well and hires missing-persons detective Phillip Winter to help her locate Trevor. The detective reveals that Trevor has a bounty on his head for stealing a big opal from a mining syndicate in Australia, and has just boarded a flight to Lisbon. When Claire and Winter catch up with Trevor, Winter handcuffs Trevor to Claire, but she voluntarily goes along with Trevor when he runs away. They go to a hotel, where Winter finds them having sex, though Trevor is able to handcuff both Winter and Claire to the bed and escape with more of Claire's money.

Still after the bounty, Winter takes Claire with him to Moscow where they meet up with Eugene, whom Claire has asked to bring her more money. A local bounty hunter helps them discover that Trevor's real name is Sam Farber, he is wanted by the U.S. government for industrial espionage, and he has a significantly larger bounty on his head than Trevor McPhee does. Winter says he is quitting the job and going home, and Eugene buys a tracking computer to help Claire, who sees Burt again and learns that Sam is wanted for stealing a camera he had helped develop at a lab in Palo Alto.

When Sam buys a ticket to Beijing on the Trans-Siberian Railway, the computer alerts Claire and she leaves Eugene while she thinks he is sleeping. Sam evades Claire, and she ends up traveling through China alone for months. She finally calls Eugene, who tells her to go to Tokyo and meets her there. They go to the capsule hotel where Sam is supposed to be staying, only to find a tied-up Winter and an ambush of bounty hunters and international government agents, tipped off by the bounty hunter from Moscow. Claire escapes and stumbles upon Sam, who is rapidly losing his eyesight, at a pachinko parlor. She buys them train tickets to a random mountain inn, where the kindly innkeepers provide herbs that heal Sam's eyes. Sam reveals to Claire that the prototype camera he stole was invented by his father, Henry, and is a device that, by recording brain impulses of the photographer for later transfer, takes pictures blind people can see. Though the recording process is hard on his eyes, he has been traveling around the world making recordings of places and people that are important to his mother, Edith, who is blind, so she can see them.

The next stop on Sam's itinerary is San Francisco. He and Claire are robbed by a used car salesman shortly after arriving, so Claire calls Chico, one of the French bank robbers, for more money. Sam cannot get the camera to work when he is trying to make a recording of his sister and niece, so Claire takes over. The final recording done, Sam, Claire, and Chico board a small boat to Australia, where Sam's parents are.

=== Act 2 ===
Eugene and Winter, who teamed up and went to Coober Pedy, Australia, to wait for Claire and Sam after losing track of them in Tokyo, (Note: Because Sam had been traveling as Trevor McPhee, who was wanted for stealing opals, and most opals are mined around Coober Pedy, Winter figured Sam's trip had probably started somewhere near there and he would come back through eventually.) pick up the trail when Claire uses her credit card to place a video call nearby. When Eugene sees Sam in town, he punches Sam and they have a brief fight before they are arrested. While Winter tries to bail them out, Burt arrives looking for Sam and the camera, but Chico is able to subdue him. The next day, Sam only takes Claire with him when he takes off to fly to the compound where his parents are hiding and his father has built a secret lab, but the others are able to follow thanks to a secret tracking device that is still on the bag Chico gave to Claire when she first transported the money to Paris.

While Claire and Sam are in the air, the satellite is shot down by the U.S. government, and the resulting nuclear electromagnetic pulse interferes with the functioning of unshielded electronics and wipes their memory units. The engine of Sam's plane stops, so he has to execute an emergency landing. He and Claire walk across the desert until they are found by Sam's friend David, who has Eugene, Winter, and Chico in the bed of his hand-cranked diesel-powered truck. David takes everyone to Sam's father's lab, which is sheltered in a massive cave. Burt eventually arrives and everyone settles in to wait and see whether communications with the outside world will be restored. Eugene, who was writing a novel about Claire and her adventures before it was erased from his computer by the NEMP, begins rewriting it on an antique typewriter.

The process Henry developed requires the person who recorded the images to watch them while being monitored in the lab before they can be transmitted to someone else's brain. Sam, who has a strained relationship with his father, attempts to do this immediately after arriving, (Note: David had taken the camera from Claire and left with it while Sam was in jail, and the viewer is not told where it was during the NEMP and why the recordings were not wiped. In the 287-minute version, Sam Farber marvels at how the camera memory disks were strong enough to retain their data.) but he fails because he is too tired, which leads to an argument with Henry. Claire tries the experiment with her recording of Sam's sister with phenomenal success, and Sam later succeeds with his recordings. Although Edith is at first exhilarated to be able to "see" again, the ugly, pixellated images she receives contribute to her growing despondency. On New Year's Eve, the same evening the group have intercepted a mundane radio broadcast that indicates human civilization has not ended, she "just let[s] go" and dies quietly.

After Edith's burial, Winter, Chico, and Burt leave the compound to go home. Henry begins working on how to use his technology to record human dreams, but the Aborigines who have been assisting him disagree with this and abandon him. He continues by experimenting on himself, Sam, and Claire, and they eventually become addicted to viewing their dreams on portable video screens. Eugene finds a catatonic Claire and takes her away from the lab, driving her into painful withdrawal when he refuses to replace the batteries for her screen. He finishes his novel, in which he writes her as being healthy and happy, and gives it to her, using the "truth of the words" to cure her of the "disease of images". Meanwhile, Sam wanders away from the lab and is ultimately cured by David and an Aboriginal ritual, and Henry is taken by the CIA while lying in the lab's dream-recording chair.

Eugene and Claire break up for good, but remain friends. Henry later dies in 2001, with Sam visiting his grave. While in San Francisco, Sam sees his wife (who has since remarried) and son from a distance, realizing that he has lost them forever. On Claire's 30th birthday, Eugene's book comes out and he, Winter, and the French bank robbers call Claire, who is in the middle of a six-month stint as an ecological observer on a space station, to sing her "Happy Birthday".

== Cast ==
The cast included:

- Solveig Dommartin as Claire Tourneur
- Chick Ortega as Chico Rémy
- Eddy Mitchell as Raymond Monnet
- William Hurt as Sam Farber, alias Trevor McPhee
- Adelle Lutz as Makiko
- Ernie Dingo as Burt
- Sam Neill as Eugene Fitzpatrick
- Rüdiger Vogler as Philip Winter
- Elena Smirnova as Krasikova
- Kuniko Miyake as Mrs. Mori
- Chishū Ryū as Mr. Mori
- Allen Garfield as Used-Car Dealer
- Lois Chiles as Elsa Farber
- David Gulpilil as David
- Jeanne Moreau as Edith Farber
- Jimmy Little as Peter
- Max von Sydow as Henry Farber
- Rhoda Roberts as Ronda

== Production ==
Wenders began working on the film as early as late 1977, when, during his first visit to Australia, it struck him that his surroundings would be the perfect setting for a science fiction film. In addition to fleshing out the complex plot, preproduction also involved extensive still photography. It was not until Wenders found commercial success with Paris, Texas and Wings of Desire, however, that he was able to secure funding for the project.

With a budget of around $22 million ($3.7 million of which came from the Australian Film Finance Corporation), which was more than he had spent on all of his previous films combined, Wenders set off on an ambitious production. Principal photography lasted 22 weeks and spanned 11 countries. Wenders, who had a long-standing fascination with the Australian Outback, shot a substantial amount of the film in and around Alice Springs, Northern Territory, Australia.

The imagery in the dream sequences were achieved with early high-definition video. Wenders and technicians at NHK (the only facility which could play back HD video at the time) worked for six weeks on these sequences, intentionally distorting the imagery to create strange visual effects. They often recorded a fast-forwarded version of the image, then played it back at normal speed.

Graeme Revell composed the theme and other music for the film. For additional music, Wenders commissioned original songs from a number of his favorite recording artists, asking them to anticipate the kind of music they would be making a decade later, when the film was set. His desire to use all of the pieces he received contributed to his decision to make the film as long as it turned out to be.

== Reception ==
The truncated version of Until the End of the World that received a theatrical release was poorly received, being both a critical and commercial failure. In the United States, the film was released by Warner Bros. Pictures in December 1991 on 4 screens. The total U.S. box office gross was just under $830,000.

In January 1992, reviewing the theatrical version of the film, Roger Ebert gave the film 2 stars out of 4, describing it as lacking the "narrative urgency" required to sustain interest in the story, and wrote that it "plays like a film that was photographed before it was written, and edited before it was completed". He went on to say that a documentary about the globe-trekking production would likely have been more interesting than the film itself.

Later critics – some responding to Wenders' director's cut – were more favorable toward it. On Rotten Tomatoes the film has an 89% approval rating based on 18 reviews. Metacritic which uses a weighted average, assigned the film a score of 63 out of 100, based on 12 critics, indicating "generally favorable" reviews.

== Home Media and versions ==
The initial cut of the film was, reportedly, 20 hours long. Several shortened versions of the film have been commercially distributed or publicly screened. Wenders was contractually obligated by his backers to deliver a standard feature-length film, so he edited it down to the 158- and 179-minute American and European cuts, which he refers to as the "Reader's Digest" versions of the film. Meanwhile, he and his editor Peter Przygodda secretly made a complete copy of the film negatives for themselves at their own expense, and over the next year they worked on a 5-hour version of the film, which they then screened at events over the next decade. A version similar to the one shown at these screenings was released at one point as a 280-minute trilogy of films.

The film was first released on VHS and LaserDisc by Warner Home Video in 1992 in the United States with the 158-minute cut. The 158-minute cut of the film was not reissued on DVD or on Blu-Ray in North America, but it was released only on DVD in the United Kingdom by Metrodome in 2007.

There is also a 181-minute letterboxed and subtitled laserdisc release from Japan that includes a 59-minute "making of" documentary, and there are several unauthorized fan edits that combine portions of the aforementioned releases.

A 4K digital restoration from the original Super 35mm camera negative of the 287-minute director's cut was commissioned by the Wim Wenders Foundation in 2014. The restoration, which was supervised by the director and his wife Donata, was undertaken by ARRI Film & TV Services Berlin, with the support of the CNC. This version was screened for the first time in the U.S. at several art house theaters in the fall of 2015 as part of a retrospective tour of Wenders' filmography by Janus Films. It was in two parts, with an intermission at 2 hours, 11 minutes, and debuted on television in the U.S. on Turner Classic Movies in July 2017.

In September 2019, The Criterion Collection announced a special-edition Blu-ray and DVD of the 4K restoration of the 287-minute director's cut of the film, which was released on 10 December 2019.

== Soundtrack ==
Until The End of the World: Music From the Motion Picture Soundtrack was released on 10 December 1991, and includes the following tracks:

1. "Opening Title" – Graeme Revell
2. "Sax and Violins" – Talking Heads
3. "Summer Kisses, Winter Tears" – Julee Cruise
4. "Move with Me (Dub)" – Neneh Cherry
5. "The Adversary" – Crime & the City Solution
6. "What's Good" – Lou Reed
7. "Last Night Sleep" – Can
8. "Fretless" – R.E.M.
9. "Days" – Elvis Costello
10. "Claire's Theme" – Graeme Revell
11. "(I'll Love You) Till the End of the World" – Nick Cave & The Bad Seeds
12. "It Takes Time" – Patti Smith (with Fred Smith)
13. "Death's Door" – Depeche Mode
14. "Love Theme" – Graeme Revell
15. "Calling All Angels" (Remix Version) – Jane Siberry with k.d. lang
16. "Humans from Earth" – T Bone Burnett
17. "Sleeping in the Devil's Bed" – Daniel Lanois
18. "Until the End of the World" – U2
19. "Finale" – Graeme Revell

Songs used in the film, but not included on the soundtrack, include:

- "Trois Jeux d'enfants: Nze-nze-nze", performed by Aka Pygmies (Aka people) (from Centre Afrique: Anthologie de la musique des Pygmées Aka (Ocora C559012 13, 1987))
- "Blood of Eden", written and performed by Peter Gabriel (a different version, which features Sinead O'Connor, appears on his 1992 album Us, and was released as a single; the version in the film is only available as an alternative track on the CD single of the original, and on his album of out-takes and rarities, Flotsam and Jetsam)
- "Breakin' the Rules", written and performed by Robbie Robertson (also released on Robertson's album Storyville)
- "Lagoons", performed by Gondwanaland (also released on their album "Wide Skies")
- "Travelin' Light", performed by the Boulevard of Broken Dreams Orchestra
- "The Twist", performed by Chubby Checker
- "Summer Kisses, Winter Tears", performed by Elvis Presley
- "La Vieil Homme De La Mer", performed by Laurent Petitgand

The German film director Uli M Schueppel made a documentary film about the recording of "(I'll Love You) Till The End of the World" by Nick Cave & The Bad Seeds. The film was released in 1990 as The Song and re-released in 2004 under a new arrangement.
