= German Society of Cinematographers =

The Great German Society of Cinematographers (German: Berufsverband Kinematografie; abbreviated "BVK"), was founded in 1980 as a non-profit professional association of German freelance cinematographers and directors of photography and their collaborators.

== Aims and objectives ==
The BVK presents, administers, and promotes its members' professional and financial interests in conjunction with allied professional bodies in the audiovisual field. It seeks recognition for the standing of the profession and promotes its public media image. The BVK also seeks to strengthen the profession's influence in the film world.

== Activities and memberships ==
The BVK widens its members' qualifications by working together with the equipment factories through seminars and workshops, while also encouraging technical innovation. The BVK is a founding member of the European Federation of Cinematographers/IMAGO and tries to intensify the international cooperation of directors of photography. The CameraGuide, published annually, and BVK's website provide a source of information on members' qualifications and standing.
