= Don't Come Knocking =

2005 film by Wim Wenders

- U.S. theatrical poster
- Directed by: Wim Wenders
- Written by: Sam Shepard; Wim Wenders
- Produced by: Karsten Brünig; Lee In-Ah; Peter Schwartzkopff
- Starring: Sam Shepard; Jessica Lange; Tim Roth
- Cinematography: Franz Lustig
- Edited by: Peter Przygodda
- Music by: T Bone Burnett
- Distributed by: Sony Pictures Classics
- Release date: May 19, 2005 (Cannes Film Festival)
- Running time: 118 minutes
- Countries: United States; Germany
- Language: English
- Budget: ~ US$11,000,000
- Box office: $4.63 million

Don't Come Knocking is a 2005 American neo-Western film directed by Wim Wenders, and written by Wenders and Sam Shepard. They had previously collaborated on the film Paris, Texas (1984). It was submitted at the 2005 Cannes Film Festival.

== Plot ==
Shepard stars as Howard Spence, an aging, hard-living western actor, who flees by horse from the set of his latest western filming in the desert outside Moab, Utah. He hits the road looking for refuge in his past, traveling to his hometown of Elko, Nevada, to visit his mother, whom he never saw in thirty years. At Butte, Montana, he reunites with a woman (Jessica Lange) whom he left behind after twenty years before when he was filming a movie there. Also converging on Butte is a young woman named Sky (Sarah Polley), returning her late mother's ashes to her hometown and conducting a search of her own. Spence is doggedly pursued by Mr. Sutter (Tim Roth), a humorless representative of the company insuring Spence's latest film, whose mission is to return Spence to the set to finish filming the movie.

== Cast ==
- Sam Shepard as Howard Spence
- Jessica Lange as Doreen
- Tim Roth as Sutter
- Gabriel Mann as Earl
- Sarah Polley as Sky
- Fairuza Balk as Amber
- Eva Marie Saint as Howard's Mother
- James Gammon as Old Ranch Hand
- Marley Shelton as the starlet
- Kurt Fuller as Mr. Daily

== Actors and cameos ==
The film features cameo appearances by George Kennedy as a beleaguered movie director, and Tim Matheson and Julia Sweeney as movie producers. Also appearing briefly is Tom Farrell (from Wenders 1980 Lightning Over Water and the Screaming Man from Paris, Texas) as a high-school acquaintance who recognizes Howard along the way. The film also marks the first collaboration in 18 years (since 1988's Far North) between Shepard and his longtime partner Jessica Lange, as the two had an agreement never to work at the same time, in order not to neglect their children. Lange, Saint, Polley and Kennedy are all winners of Academy Awards.

== Photography ==
The film was shot in 35mm anamorphic format by Franz Lustig using Hawk lenses. He and Wenders emphasized the influence of painter Edward Hopper on the cinematography.

== Music ==
Most of the soundtrack was composed by T Bone Burnett and performed by Cassandra Wilson on vocals, Carla Azar on drums, Jay Bellerose on drums, Stephen Bruton on manaicello, Daphne Chen on violin, Keefus Ciancia on keyboards, Armando Compean on bass, Dennis Crouch on bass, Tony Gilkyson on guitar, Leah Katz on viola, Emile Kelman on cello, Jim Keltner on drums, Marc Ribot on guitar and Patrick Warren who also composed additional music on keyboards and pump organ.

The title song "Don't Come Knocking" was performed by Andrea Corr & Bono.

== Reception ==
Review aggregator Rotten Tomatoes reports a 43% "Rotten" score with an average rating of 5.4/10, based on 101 reviews. The website's critics consensus reads, "The cinematography conjures beautifully evocative landscapes, but aside from that, the film is meandering and pointless." On Metacritic, the film holds a weighted average score of 55 out of 100, based on 27 critics, indicating "mixed or average" reviews.

Roger Ebert gave the film 2.5 out of 4 stars and while he praised the cinematography and claimed he had never seen Shepard be less than authentic, ultimately the film didn't work for him.
