= Wim Wenders =

German filmmaker (born 1945)

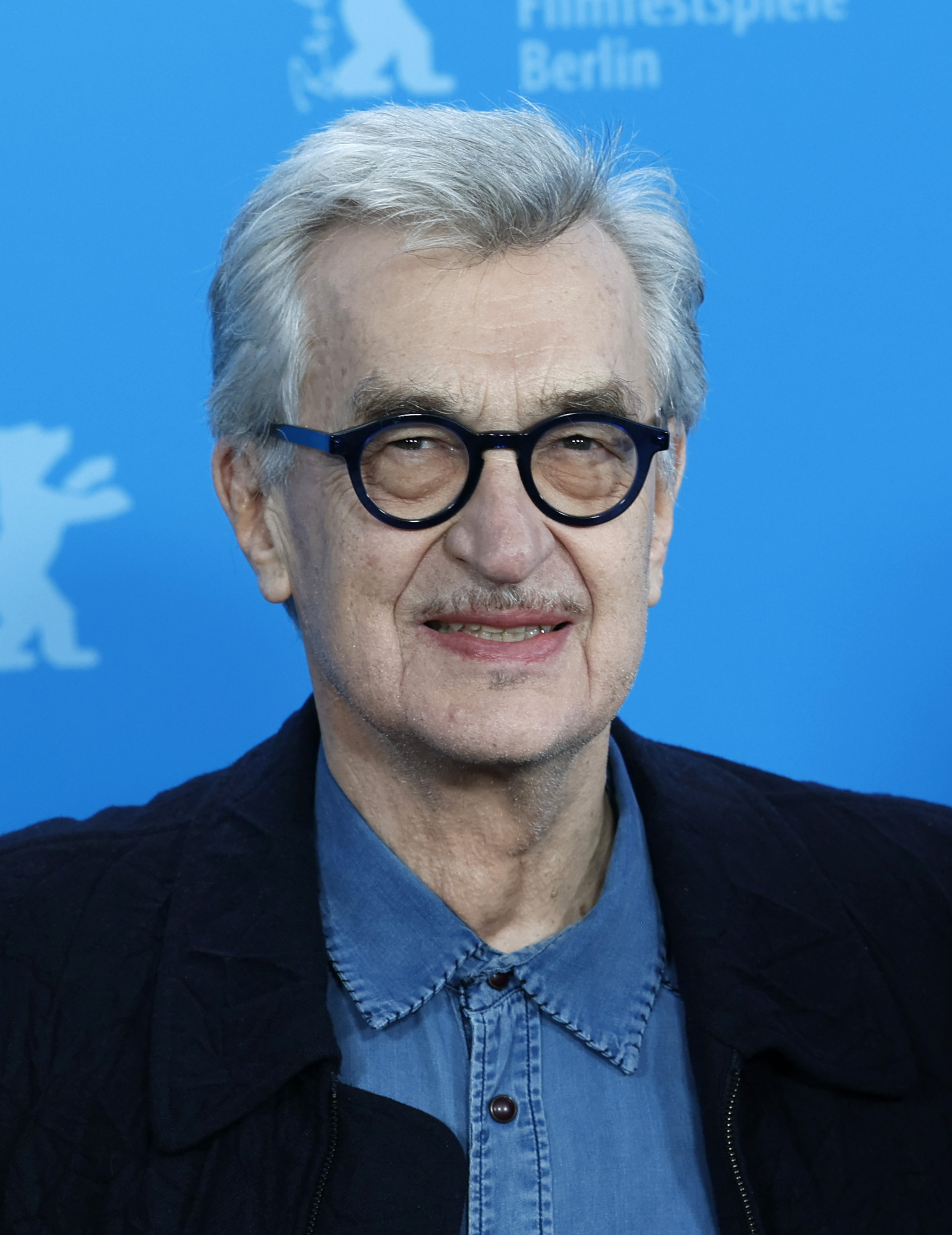
- Wenders in 2026
- Born: Wilhelm Ernst Wenders; 14 August 1945 (age 81); Düsseldorf, Germany
- Occupations: Film director; screenwriter; producer; photographer; author
- Years active: 1967–present
- Spouses: Edda Köchl (m. 1968; div. 1974) Lisa Kreuzer (m. 1974; div. 1978) Ronee Blakley (m. 1979; div. 1981) Isabelle Weingarten (m. 1981; div. 1982) Donata Wenders (m. 1993)
- Awards: Full list
- Website: www.wim-wenders.com

Wim Wenders (German: [ˈvɪm ˈvɛndɐs]; born Wilhelm Ernst Wenders; 14 August 1945) is a German filmmaker and photographer. Regarded as a major figure of New German Cinema and widely considered an auteur director, he has received various accolades, including a BAFTA Award, a Palme d'Or, a Golden Lion, and an Honorary Golden Bear, in addition to nominations for four Academy Awards, an Emmy Award, and a Grammy Award.

Wenders made his feature film debut with Summer in the City (1970). He earned critical acclaim for directing the films Alice in the Cities (1974), The Wrong Move (1975), and Kings of the Road (1976), later known as the Road Movie trilogy. Wenders won the BAFTA Award for Best Direction and the Palme d'Or for Paris, Texas (1984) and the Cannes Film Festival Best Director Award for Wings of Desire (1987). His other notable films include The American Friend (1977), Faraway, So Close! (1993), and Perfect Days (2023).

Wenders has received three nominations for the Academy Award for Best Documentary Feature: for Buena Vista Social Club (1999), Pina (2011), and The Salt of the Earth (2014). He received a nomination for the Grammy Award for Best Long Form Music Video for Willie Nelson at the Teatro (1998). He is also known for directing the documentaries Tokyo-Ga (1985), The Soul of a Man (2003), Pope Francis: A Man of His Word (2018), and Anselm (2023).

Wenders formerly served as the president of the European Film Academy from 1996–2020. He also earned an Honorary Golden Bear in 2015. He is an active photographer, emphasizing images of desolate landscapes.

== Early life and education ==
Wenders was born in Düsseldorf into a traditionally Catholic family. His father, Heinrich Wenders, was a surgeon. The Dutch name "Wim" is a shortened version of the baptismal name "Wilhelm". As a boy, Wenders took unaccompanied trips to Amsterdam to visit the Rijksmuseum. He graduated from high school in Oberhausen in the Ruhr area. He then studied medicine at the University of Freiburg (1963–64) and philosophy at the University of Dusseldorf (1964–65), but dropped out and moved to Paris in October 1966 in order to become a painter. He failed his entry test at France's national film school, IDHEC (now La Fémis), and instead became an engraver at Johnny Friedlaender's studio in Montparnasse. During this time he became fascinated with cinema, and saw up to five movies a day at the local movie theater.

Set on making his obsession his life's work, he returned to Germany in 1967 to work in the Düsseldorf office of United Artists. That fall, he entered the University of Television and Film Munich (HFF). Between 1967 and 1970, while at the HFF, he also worked as a film critic for FilmKritik, the Munich daily newspaper Süddeutsche Zeitung, Twen magazine, and Der Spiegel.

Wenders completed several short films before graduating from the Hochschule with a 16mm black-and-white film, Summer in the City (1970), his feature directorial debut.

== Career ==
=== 1970–1976: Film debut and early work ===
Wenders's career began in the late 1960s, the New German Cinema era. Much of the distinctive cinematography in his movies is the result of a long-term collaboration with Dutch cinematographer Robby Müller. Wenders made his directorial film debut with Summer in the City (1970), his graduation project at the University of Television and Film Munich, which he attended from 1967 to 1970. Shot in 16 mm black-and-white by Müller, the movie exhibited many of Wenders's later trademark themes of aimless searching, running from invisible demons, and persistent wandering toward an indeterminate goal. Protagonist Hans (Zischler) is released from prison, and after searching through seedy West German streets and bars, he visits an old friend in Berlin.

Wenders then directed The Goalkeeper's Fear of the Penalty, titled The Goalie's Anxiety at the Penalty Kick in the United States. The film was adapted from Peter Handke's 1970 short novel. He then directed the period drama The Scarlet Letter (1973), adapted from Nathaniel Hawthorne's 1850 novel of the same name. From 1974 to 1976 Wender directed the Road Movie trilogy. The first film in the trilogy was Alice in the Cities (1974), which was shot in 16mm. The last two films are The Wrong Move (1975) and Kings of the Road (1976), the latter of which won the FIPRESCI Prize at the 1976 Cannes Film Festival.

=== 1977–1987: Breakthrough and acclaim ===
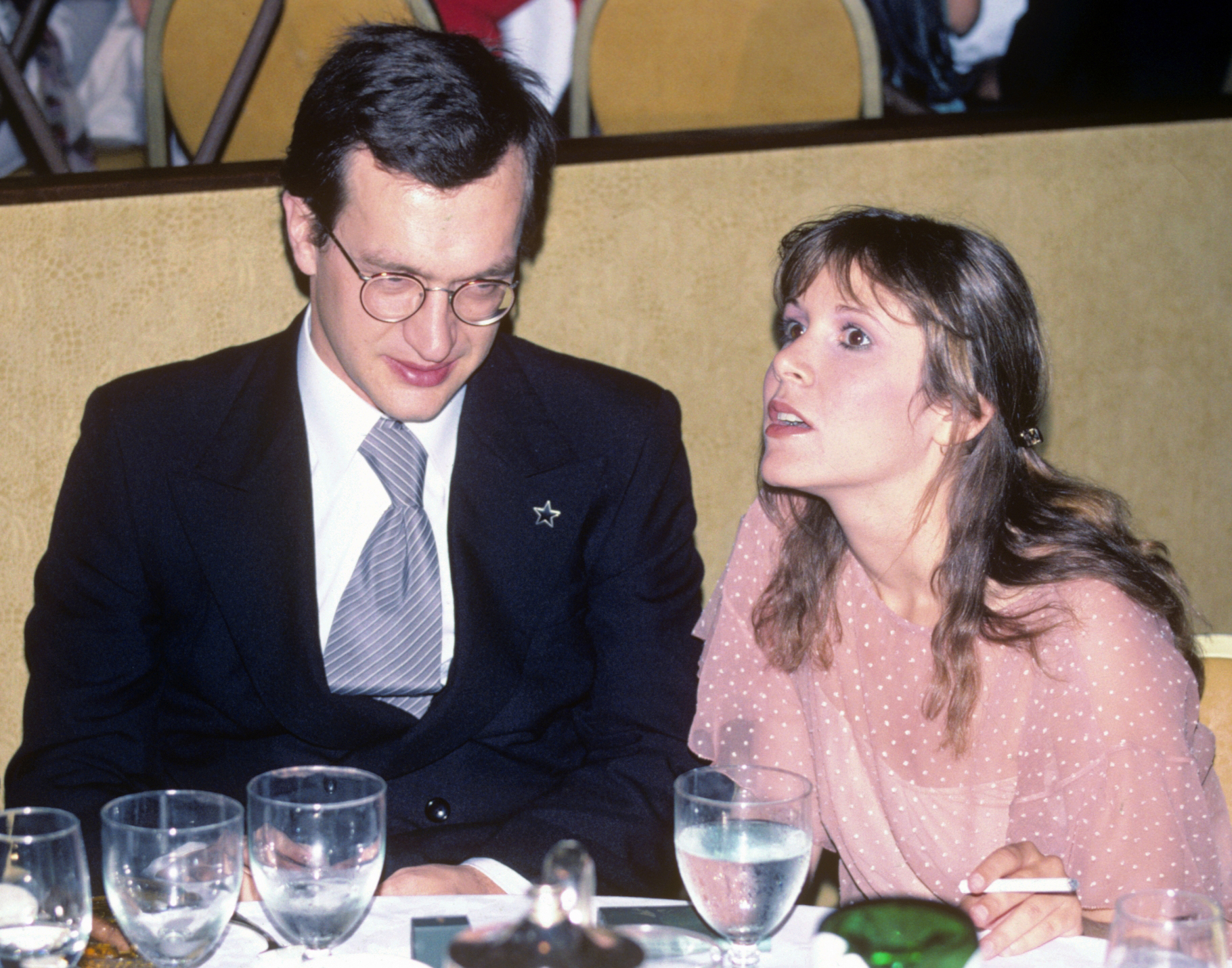
Wenders with Carrie Fisher in 1978

In 1977 Wenders gained prominence for directing the neo-noir The American Friend, starring Dennis Hopper and Bruno Ganz. The film is adapted from the Patricia Highsmith 1974 novel Ripley's Game. J. Hoberman of The New York Times has compared the film to Martin Scorsese's Taxi Driver, writing, "Like Taxi Driver, The American Friend was a new sort of movie-movie—sleekly brooding, voluptuously alienated and saturated with cinephilia."

Wenders earned critical acclaim for his road drama Paris, Texas (1984), starring Harry Dean Stanton, Nastassja Kinski and Dean Stockwell. The film premiered at the 1984 Cannes Film Festival, where it won the Palme d'Or. Critic Roger Ebert wrote of the film, "[it's] a movie with the kind of passion and willingness to experiment that was more common fifteen years ago than it is now. It has more links with films like Five Easy Pieces and Easy Rider and Midnight Cowboy than with the slick arcade games that are the box-office winners of the 1980s. It is true, deep, and brilliant".

Wenders then directed the romance fantasy Wings of Desire (1987), starring Bruno Ganz and Peter Falk. It premiered at the 1987 Cannes Film Festival, where Wenders won the Cannes Film Festival Award for Best Director. Peter Handke co-wrote the screenplay. West Germany submitted Wings of Desire for consideration for the Academy Award for Best Foreign Language Film, a bid supported by its distribution company. It was not nominated; the academy seldom recognized West German cinema. The film was one of the most acclaimed films of the year, with many critics adding it on their top 10 lists.

=== 1991–2010: Career fluctuations ===
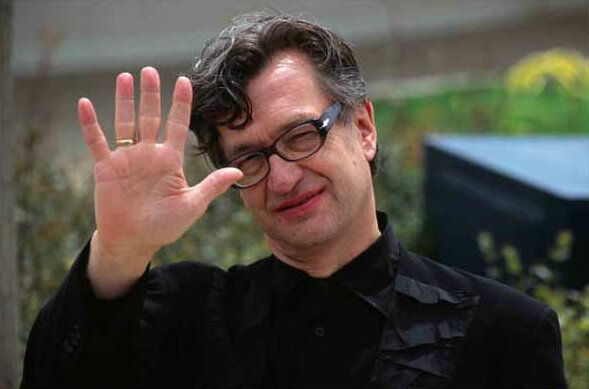
Wenders at the 2002 Cannes Film Festival

In 1991 Wenders directed the science fiction adventure drama Until the End of the World, starring William Hurt, Solveig Dommartin, Max Von Sydow and Jeanne Moreau. The film has been released in several editions, ranging in length from 158 to 287 minutes, with the longer versions receiving mixed reviews. In 1993 he directed Faraway, So Close!, a sequel to Wings of Desire. Actors Otto Sander, Bruno Ganz and Peter Falk reprised their roles as angels who have become human. The film also stars Nastassja Kinski, Willem Dafoe and Heinz Rühmann, in his last film role. It received critical acclaim, premiering at the 1993 Cannes Film Festival, where it earned the Grand Prix. The next year, he directed Lisbon Story, which screened at Un Certain Regard at the 1994 Cannes Film Festival. In 1995 he directed both A Trick of Light and the anthology film Lumière and Company.

In 1997, Wenders directed the American drama film The End of Violence, starring Bill Pullman, Andie MacDowell, and Gabriel Byrne. The film received negative reviews and performed poorly at the box office after its debut at the 1997 Cannes Film Festival. Like many other of Wenders's American movies, it was shot in multiple locations, including the Griffith Observatory and the Santa Monica Pier. Wenders has directed several highly acclaimed documentaries, including Willie Nelson at the Teatro, a documentary about the recording sessions of Teatro (1998). The next year he directed Buena Vista Social Club, about the music of Cuba. It was nominated for the Academy Award for Best Documentary Feature. In 2002, he directed a documentary about the German rock group BAP called Viel passiert (A lot has happened).

=== 2011–present: Resurgence with documentaries ===
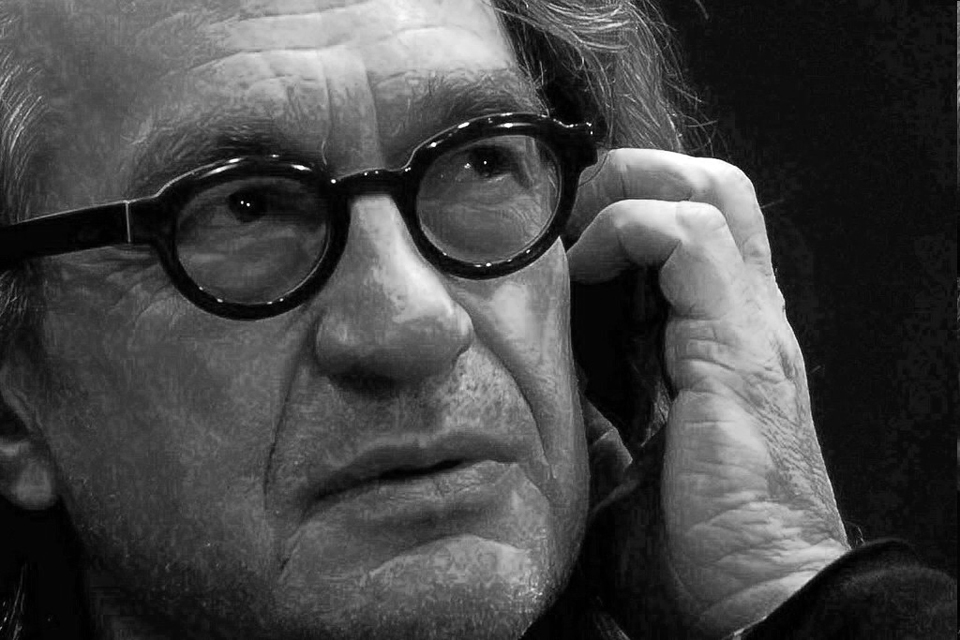
Wenders in 2008

Wenders has directed music videos for groups such as U2 and Talking Heads, including "Stay (Faraway, So Close!)" and "Sax and Violins". His television commercials include a UK advertisement for Carling Premier Canadian beer. Wenders's book Emotion Pictures, a collection of diary essays written as a film student, was adapted and broadcast as a series of plays on BBC Radio 3, featuring Peter Capaldi as Wenders, with Gina McKee, Saskia Reeves, Dennis Hopper, Harry Dean Stanton and Ricky Tomlinson, dramatized by Neil Cargill.

Wenders also directed a documentary-style film on the Skladanowsky brothers, known in English as A Trick of the Light. The Skladanowsky brothers were inventing "moving pictures" when several others like the Lumière brothers and William Friese-Greene were doing the same. In 2011, Wenders was selected to stage the 2013 cycle of Richard Wagner's Der Ring des Nibelungen at the Bayreuth Festival. The project fell through when he insisted on filming in 3-D, which the Wagner family found too costly and disruptive. In 2012, while promoting his 3-D dance film Pina, Wenders told the Documentary channel blog that he had begun work on a new 3-D documentary about architecture. He also said he would only work in 3-D from then on. Wenders had admired the dance choreographer Pina Bausch since 1985, but only with the advent of digital 3-D cinema did he decide that he could sufficiently capture her work on screen.

In 2015, Wenders collaborated with artist/journalist and longtime friend Melinda Camber Porter on a documentary feature about his body of work, Wim Wenders – Visions on Film. Porter died before it was finished, and the film remains incomplete. Wenders is a member of the advisory board of World Cinema Foundation. The project was founded by Martin Scorsese and aims to find and reconstruct world cinema films that have been neglected. As of 2015 he served as a Jury Member for the digital studio Filmaka, a platform for undiscovered filmmakers to show their work to industry professionals.

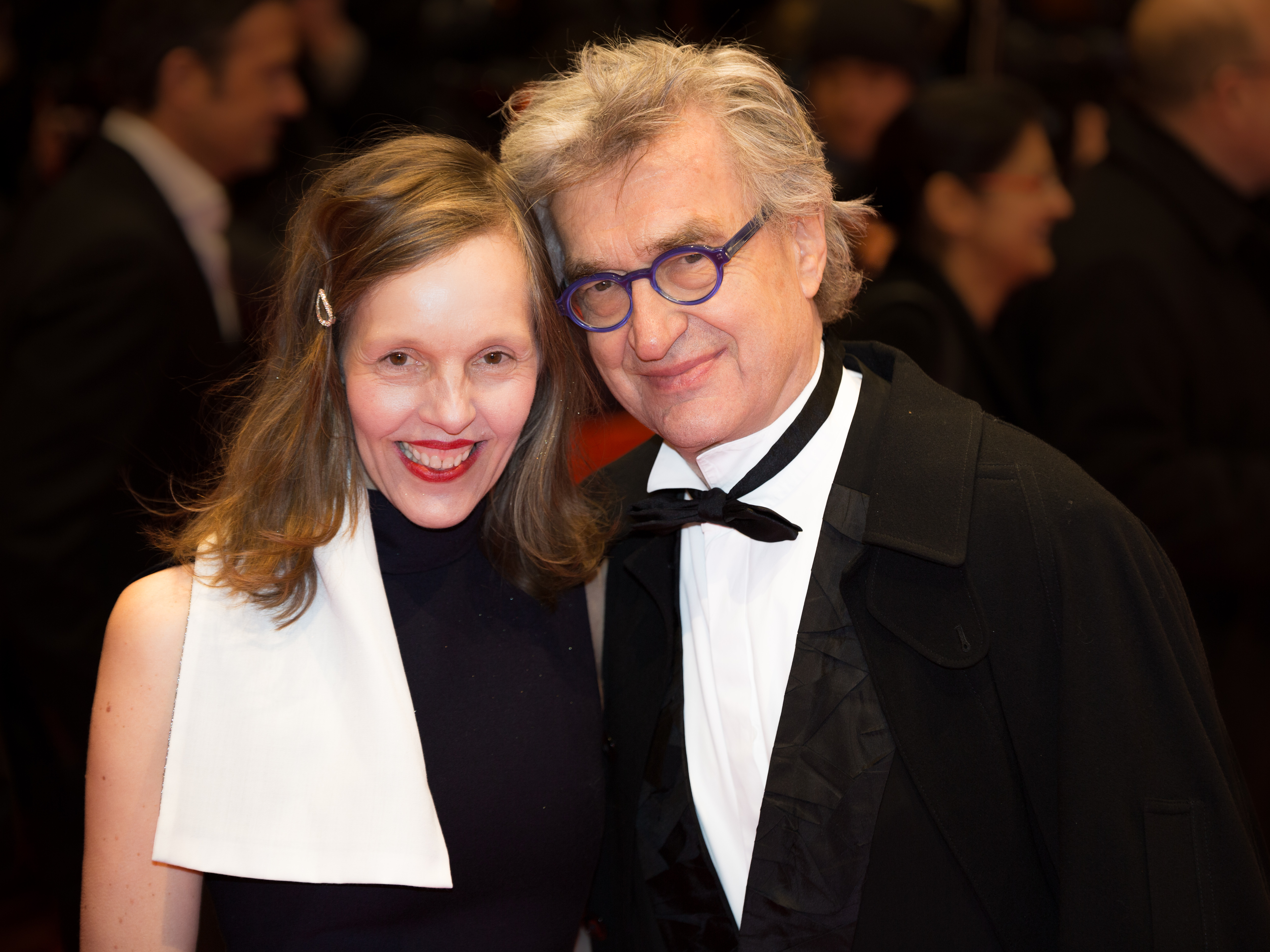
Wenders with wife Donata at Berlinale 2017

In June 2017, Wenders stage-directed Georges Bizet's opera Les Pêcheurs de perles, starring Olga Peretyatko and Francesco Demuro and conducted by Daniel Barenboim at the Berlin State Opera (Staatsoper). In a 2018 interview, he said his favorite movie of all time was his film about Pope Francis, and that his entire career had been building up to it. His admiration for Francis is profound; he said he felt Francis is doing his best in a world full of calamities. He also said that, though raised Catholic, he had converted to Protestantism years earlier.

In 2019 Wenders acted as executive producer for his former assistant director Luca Lucchesi's documentary A Black Jesus, which has similar themes to Pope Francis: A Man of His Word. The film explores the role of religion in communal identity and how this can create or dissolve differences in a small Sicilian town during the height of the refugee crisis. Lucchesi noted that Wenders pushed the film to be more symbolic and philosophical, saying that Wenders wanted the film to have a "universal fairy-tale aspect" and to represent "Europe in a nutshell".

In 2025, Wenders made a short film called "The Keys to Freedom" in Reims, France. In the film, Wenders tours the Museum of the Surrender, where General Eisenhower gave the liberated city's keys to the mayor in 1945, and comments "These are the keys to the freedom of the world". Wenders told The New York Times that Europeans can no longer assume American protection, adding that young people take freedom for granted, not realizing they may soon need to defend it.

== Photography ==
Wenders has worked with photographic images of desolate landscapes and themes of memory, time, loss, nostalgia and movement. He began his long-running project "Pictures from the Surface of the Earth" in the early 1980s and pursued it for 20 years. The initial photographic series was titled "Written in the West" and was produced while Wenders criss-crossed the American West in preparation for his film Paris, Texas (1984). It became the starting point for a nomadic journey across the globe, including Germany, Australia, Cuba, Israel and Japan, to take photographs capturing the essence of a moment, place or space.

== Personal life ==
Wenders lives and works in Berlin with his wife, Donata. He has lived in Berlin since the mid-1970s. He is an ecumenical Christian; as a teenager he wished to become a Catholic priest. He supports the football club Borussia Dortmund.

In 2009, Wenders signed a petition in support of director Roman Polanski, who had been detained while traveling to a film festival in relation to his 1977 sexual abuse charges, which the petition argued would undermine the tradition of film festivals as a place for works to be shown "freely and safely" and argued that arresting filmmakers traveling to neutral countries could open the door to "actions of which no-one can know the effects."

From 1979 to 1981, Wenders was married to the American actress and singer-songwriter Ronee Blakley.

== Filmography ==
=== Film ===
Short film

Year	Title	Director	Writer	Producer	Notes
1967	Sceneries	Yes	Yes	Yes	Also cinematographer and editor
1968	Same Player Shoots Again	Yes	Yes	Yes	Also cinematographer and editor
1968	Blurb Film	Yes	No	No	Co-directed with Gerhard Theuring
1968	Victor I.	Yes	No	No	
1969	Alabama (2000 Light Years)	Yes	Yes	No	Also editor and sound
1992	Arisha, the Bear, and the Stone Ring	Yes	Yes	Yes	
1995	Segment 38	Yes	No	No	Segment of Lumière et compagnie
2002	Twelve Miles to Trona	Yes	Yes	No	Segment from Ten Minutes Older: The Trumpet
2003	Other Side of the Road	Yes	No	No	
2007	War in Peace	Yes	Yes	No	Segment of To Each His Own Cinema
2008	Person to Person	Yes	Yes	No	Segment of 8
2012	Ver ou Não Ver	Yes	Yes	No	Segment of Mundo Invisível
2010	If Buildings Could Talk	Yes	Yes	No	
2015	Two or Three Thoughts on Edward Hopper	Yes	Yes	Yes	Also executive producer
2019	(E)motion	Yes	Yes	Yes	

Feature film

Year	Title	Director	Writer	Producer
1970	Summer in the City	Yes	Yes	Yes
1972	The Goalkeeper's Fear of the Penalty	Yes	Yes	Yes
1973	The Scarlet Letter	Yes	Yes	Yes
1974	Alice in the Cities	Yes	Yes	Yes
1975	The Wrong Move	Yes	No	Uncredited
1976	Kings of the Road	Yes	Yes	Yes
1977	The American Friend	Yes	Yes	Yes
1982	Hammett	Yes	No	No
1982	The State of Things	Yes	Yes	Yes
1984	Paris, Texas	Yes	No	No
1987	Wings of Desire	Yes	Yes	Yes
1991	Until the End of the World	Yes	Yes	Co-producer
1993	Faraway, So Close!	Yes	Yes	Yes
1994	Lisbon Story	Yes	Yes	Yes
1995	Beyond the Clouds	Partial (Note: Director of the prologue, intermissions & epilogue)	Yes	No
1997	The End of Violence	Yes	Yes	Yes
2000	The Million Dollar Hotel	Yes	No	Yes
2004	Land of Plenty	Yes	Yes	No
2005	Don't Come Knocking	Yes	Yes	Executive (Note: Uncredited)
2008	Palermo Shooting	Yes	Yes	Yes
2015	Every Thing Will Be Fine	Yes	No	No
2016	The Beautiful Days of Aranjuez	Yes	Yes	No
2017	Submergence	Yes	No	No
2023	Perfect Days	Yes	Yes	Yes

Producer only

- The Left-Handed Woman (1977)
- Radio On (1979) (Associate producer)
- ...als diesel geboren (1979)
- Iron Earth, Copper Sky (1987)
- The Absence (1992) (Co-producer)
- Go for Gold! (1997)
- Half the Rent (2002)
- Junimond (2002)
- Fools (2003)
- Egoshooter (2004)
- A Black Jesus (2018)
- Souad (2021) (Co-producer)
- An Endless Sunday (2023)

Executive producer only

- La torcedura (2004)
- Música cubana (2004)
- The House Is Burning (2006)
- The Clone Returns Home (2008)
- The Open Road (2009)
- Au Revoir, Taipei (2010)
- Sing Me the Songs That Say I Love You: A Concert for Kate McGarrigle (2012)
- Our Last Tango (2015)
- National Bird (2016)
- Little Hands (2017)
- It Must Schwing: The Blue Note Story (2018)
- Waiting for the Miracle to Come (2018)
- Karen Dalton: In My Own Time (2020)
- Reality Winner (2021)

=== Documentary works ===
Short film

Year	Title	Director	Writer	Producer	Notes
1969	Silver City Revisited	Yes	Yes	Yes	Also cinematographer and editor
1982	Reverse Angle	Yes	Yes	Yes	
2007	Invisible Crimes	Yes	Yes	No	Segment of Invisibles
2010	If Buildings Could Talk	Yes	Yes	No	
2010	Il volo	Yes	Yes	No	
2014	The Berlin Philharmonic	Yes	Yes	No	Segment of Cathedrals of Culture
2022	Présence	Yes	Yes	Executive	
2023	Somebody Comes Into the Light	Yes	No	Yes	
2025	The Keys to Freedom	Yes	Yes	No	

Film

Year	Title	Director	Writer	Producer	Notes
1980	Lightning Over Water	Yes	Yes	Yes	Co-directed by Nicholas Ray; Also editor
1985	Tokyo-Ga	Yes	Yes	Yes	Also editor and narrator
1989	Notebook on Cities and Clothes	Yes	Yes	Yes	Also cinematographer and narrator
1995	A Trick of Light	Yes	Yes	Yes	
1998	Willie Nelson at the Teatro	Yes	Yes	No	
1999	Buena Vista Social Club	Yes	Yes	No	
2002	Ode to Cologne: A Rock 'N' Roll Film	Yes	Yes	No	
2003	The Soul of a Man	Yes	Yes	No	
2011	Pina	Yes	Yes	Yes	
2014	The Salt of the Earth	Yes	Yes	Executive	Co-directed with Juliano Ribeiro Salgado
2018	Pope Francis: A Man of His Word	Yes	Yes	Yes	
2023	Anselm	Yes	No	Yes	
2026	From Inside Out: The Architecture of Peter Zumthor	Yes	Yes	Yes	

TV movies

Year	Title	Director	Writer	Producer
1969	Kaspar Hauser	Yes	No	No
1982	Room 666	Yes	Yes	Yes

TV series

Year	Title	Director	Writer	Notes
1977	A House for Us	Yes	No	2 episodes
2020	4 Walls Berlin	Yes	Yes	Episode "Change"

=== Television ===
TV shorts

Year	Title	Director	Writer	Producer	Notes
1969	Police Film	Yes	Yes	Yes	Also cinematographer and editor
1969	3 Americans LPS	Yes	No	No	Also editor

=== Music video ===
Year	Title	Artist
1990	"Night and Day"	U2
1992	"Sax and Violins"	Talking Heads
1993	"Stay (Faraway, So Close!)"	U2
1997	"Every Time I Try"	Spain
2000	"The Ground Beneath Her Feet"	U2
2000	"Warum werde ich nicht satt?"	Die Toten Hosen
2001	"Souljacker Part I"	Eels
2002	"Live in a Hiding Place"	Idlewild
2009	"Auflösen"	Die Toten Hosen
2020	"Anagnorisis"	Asaf Avidan

=== Commercials ===
Year	Title	Director	Writer	Subject
2000	"Un matin partout dans le monde"	Yes	Yes	JCDecaux
2009	"My Point of View"	Yes	Yes	Leica
2017–2018	Jil Sander: Spring/Summer 2018	Yes	Yes	Jil Sander
2021	A Future Together	Yes	No	Salvatore Frengasso

== Legacy and honors ==
Year	Association	Category	Nominated work	Result	Ref.
2000	Academy Awards	Best Documentary Feature Film	Buena Vista Social Club	Nominated	
2012	Academy Awards	Best Documentary Feature Film	Pina	Nominated	
2015	Academy Awards	Best Documentary Feature Film	The Salt of the Earth	Nominated	
2024	Academy Awards	Best International Feature Film	Perfect Days	Nominated	
2023	Asia Pacific Screen Awards	Best Feature Film	Perfect Days	Won	
2024	Asian Film Awards	Best Film	Perfect Days	Nominated	
1987	Bavarian Film Awards	Best Director	Wings of Desire	Won	
1993	Bavarian Film Awards	Best Director	Faraway, So Close!	Won	
1988	Belgian Film Critics Association	Grand Prix	Wings of Desire	Won	
2024	Belgian Film Critics Association	Grand Prix	Perfect Days	Nominated	
2015	Berlin International Film Festival	Honorary Golden Bear	—N/a	Won	
1985	British Academy Film Awards	Best Direction	Paris, Texas	Won	
1989	British Academy Film Awards	Best Film Not in the English Language	Wings of Desire	Nominated	
2000	British Academy Film Awards	Best Film Not in the English Language	Buena Vista Social Club	Nominated	
2012	British Academy Film Awards	Best Film Not in the English Language	Pina	Nominated	
1984	Cannes Film Festival	Palme d'Or	Paris, Texas	Won	
1987	Cannes Film Festival	Best Director	Wings of Desire	Won	
1993	Cannes Film Festival	Grand Prix	Faraway, So Close!	Won	
1978	César Awards	Best Foreign Film	The American Friend	Nominated	
1985	César Awards	Best Foreign Film	Paris, Texas	Nominated	
1988	César Awards	Best Foreign Film	Wings of Desire	Nominated	
2015	César Awards	Best Documentary Film	The Salt of the Earth	Won	
2024	César Awards	Best Foreign Film	Perfect Days	Nominated	
1985	David di Donatello	Best Foreign Film	Paris, Texas	Nominated	
2015	David di Donatello	Best Foreign Film	The Salt of the Earth	Nominated	
1988	European Film Awards	European Film	Wings of Desire	Nominated	
1988	European Film Awards	European Director	Wings of Desire	Won	
1999	European Film Awards	European Documentary	Buena Vista Social Club	Won	
2005	European Film Awards	European Director	Don't Come Knocking	Nominated	
2011	European Film Awards	European Documentary	Pina	Won	
2024	European Film Awards	Lifetime Achievement Award	—N/a	Honored	
2017	Filmfest Hamburg	Douglas Sirk Award	—N/a	Won	
2001	Grammy Awards	Best Long Form Music Video	Teatro (Video)	Nominated	
2004	International Filmfestival Mannheim-Heidelberg	Master of Cinema Award	—N/a	Won	
2024	Japan Academy Film Prize	Director of the Year	Perfect Days	Won	
2005	Locarno Film Festival	Leopard of Honour	—N/a	Won	
2022	The Imperial Family of Japan; The Japan Art Association	Praemium Imperiale	—N/a	Honored	
2025	Order of the Rising Sun	4th Class, Gold Rays with Rosette	—N/a	Honored	
1982	Venice Film Festival	Golden Lion	The State of Things	Won	
2012	Writers Guild of America Awards	Best Documentary Screenplay	Pina	Nominated	

Wenders has been awarded honorary doctorates by the Sorbonne in Paris in 1989, the University of Fribourg (Switzerland) in 1995, and the Université Catholique de Louvain, Belgium, in 2005. The Wim Wenders Foundation was established in Düsseldorf in 2012. It provides a framework to bring together his cinematic, photographic, artistic and literary works in his native country and make them permanently accessible to the public. In 2016, he received the Großer Kulturpreis of the Sparkassen Culture-Foundation Rhineland. Wim-Wenders-Gymnasium was founded in Düsseldorf-Oberbilk in 2017 and bears his name since the 1 August 2018.

== Exhibitions ==
1986–1992

- Written in the West, in conjunction with the publication, Written in the West, Munich: Schirmer/Mosel (1987)

1993–1995

- Wim Wenders Photo Exhibition, in conjunction with the publication, Once, Munich: Schirmer/ Mosel (2001)

2004

- Pictures from the Surface of the Earth, Australia and Japan, James Cohan Gallery, New York
- Between The Lines, group exhibition, James Cohan Gallery, New York

2006

- Wim Wenders: Immagini dal pianeta terra, Scuderie del Quirinale, Rome, Italy
- Journey to Onomichi – Photos by Wim and Donata Wenders, Omotesando Hills, Tokyo, Japan

2011

- Places, strange and quiet, Haunch of Venison, London, UK

2012

- Places Strange and Quiet, Ostlicht. Galerie Für Fotografie, Vienna, AT
- Places, strange and quiet, Harald Falckenberg Exhibition Space, Deichtorhallen, Hamburg, DE
- Wim Wenders: Pictures from the Surface of the Earth, Multimedia Art Museum, Moscow, RU

2014

- Wim Wenders: Places Strange & Quiet, GL Strand, Copenhagen, DK
- Wim Wenders: Urban Solitude, Palazzo Incontro, Rome, IT

2015

- Wim Wenders: America, Villa e collezione la Panza, Varese, IT
- "In broad daylight even the sounds shine. Wim Wenders scouting in Portugal", curated by Anna Duque y González and Laura Schmidt Reservatório da Mãe d'Água das Amoreiras, Lisbon

2016

- "The Space Between the Characters Can Carry the Load", Collection Ivo Wessel, Weserburg Museum for modern Art, Bremen, DE

2017/2018

- "Instant Stories/Wim Wenders' Polaroids", The Photographers' Gallery, London, from 20 October 2017 to 11 February 2018.

=== Installation art ===
2019

- (E)motion

2020

- Two or Three Things I Know About Edward Hopper

2022

- Presence, with Claudine Drai

== Bibliography ==
- Lindbergh, Peter; Wenders, Wim (2002), Peter Lindbergh: stories, Santa Fe: Arena Editions, ISBN 978-1-892041-64-7
- Shepard, Sam; Wenders, Wim (1991), Paris, Texas: Screenplay, New York: Ecco Press, ISBN 978-0-88001-266-9
- Steinhilber, Berthold; Wenders, Wim (2003), Ghost towns of the American West, New York: Harry N. Abrams, Inc., ISBN 978-0-8109-4508-1
- Wenders, Wim (1986), Emotion pictures: Essays und Filmkritiken, 1968–1984, Frankfurt: Verlag der Autoren, ISBN 978-3-88661-078-5
- Wenders, Wim (1989), Emotion pictures: reflections on cinema, London: Faber and Faber, ISBN 978-0-571-15271-1
- Wenders, Wim (2001), Once: pictures and stories, New York: DAP/Schirmer/Mosel, ISBN 978-1-891024-25-2
- Wenders, Wim (1984), Paris, Texas, Nördlingen: Greno, ISBN 978-3-921568-11-8
- Wenders, Wim (2001), Written in the West, New York: teNeues, ISBN 978-3-8238-5469-2
- Wenders, Wim; Handke, Peter (1998), Der Himmel über Berlin: Ein Filmbuch von Wim Wenders und Peter Handke (in German), Berlin: Suhrkamp Verlag, ISBN 978-3-518-02406-5
- Wenders, Wim; Hofmann, Michael (1992), The logic of images: essays and conversations, London: Faber and Faber, ISBN 978-0-571-16517-9
- Wenders, Wim (1997), The Act of Seeing:Essays and Conversations, London: Faber and Faber, ISBN 978-0-571178-43-8
- Wenders, Wim; Hofmann, Michael (2000), My time with Antonioni: the diary of an extraordinary experience, London: Faber and Faber, ISBN 978-0-571-20076-4
- Wenders, Wim; Hofmann, Michael (2001), On film: essays and conversations, London: Faber and Faber, ISBN 978-0-571-20718-3
- Wenders, Wim; Tawada, Yoko (2007), Where Europe begins, New York: New Directions Publishers, ISBN 978-0-8112-1702-6
- Wenders, Wim; Wenders, Donata (2000), The heart is a sleeping Beauty: the Million Dollar Hotel - a film book, New York: teNeues, ISBN 978-3-8238-5468-5
- Wenders, Wim; Zournazi, Mary (2013), Inventing Peace: A Dialogue on Perception, London: I.B.Tauris, ISBN 978-1-78076-693-5

== See also ==
- List of German Academy Award winners and nominees
- BlainSouthern
- James Cohan Gallery
- Jerusalem 2111
