= List of Academy Award winners and nominees from Brazil =

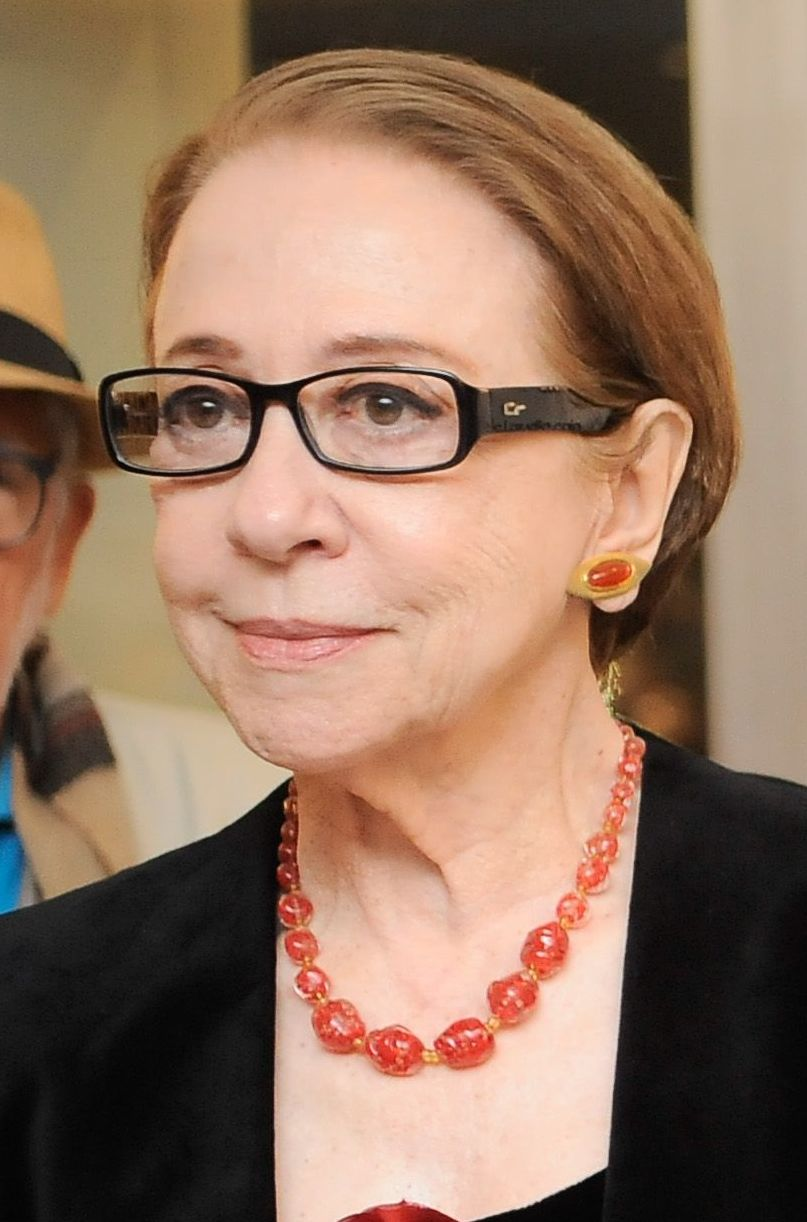
Fernanda Montenegro became the first Portuguese-speaking actress to be nominated for an Academy Award in 1998.

This is a list of Brazilian Academy Awards winners and nominees, totaling twenty-six nominations in fifteen different categories and one win.

The first Brazilian to be nominated for an Academy Award was Ary Barroso, one of Música Popular Brasileira's greatest composers, in 1945 for Best Music (Original Song). In 2025, the film I'm Still Here became the first Brazilian victory at the Academy Awards, winning the Best International Feature Film category.

In this list, the nominations are presented by categories (for Brazilian nominees) and by productions (for Brazilian coproductions and nominees).

== By category ==
This section presents a list of films in which at least one of the nominees in the category is a Brazilian artist.

=== Best Picture ===
Best Picture
| Year | Film Title | Nominee(s) | Status | Milestone/Notes |
| 2024 | I'm Still Here (Ainda Estou Aqui) | Maria Carlota Bruno; Rodrigo Teixeira | Nominated | First Portuguese-speaking movie nominated in this category. |

=== Best Directing ===
Best Directing
| Year | Film Title | Nominee(s) | Status | Milestone/Notes |
| 1985 | Kiss of the Spider Woman (O Beijo da Mulher Aranha) | Héctor Babenco | Nominated | Babenco was an Argentine-born Brazilian director. |
| 2002 | City of God (Cidade de Deus) | Fernando Meirelles | Nominated | |

=== Best Actor in a Leading Role ===
Best Actor in a Leading Role
| Year | Film Title | Nominee(s) | Status | Milestone/Notes |
| 2025 | The Secret Agent (O Agente Secreto) | Wagner Moura | Nominated | |

=== Best Actress in a Leading Role ===
Best Actress in a Leading Role
| Year | Film Title | Nominee(s) | Status | Milestone/Notes |
| 1998 | Central Station (Central do Brasil) | Fernanda Montenegro | Nominated | First Latin American to be nominated for Best Actress and first actress to be nominated for a Portuguese-speaking role. |
| 2024 | I'm Still Here (Ainda Estou Aqui) | Fernanda Torres | Nominated | Fernanda Montenegro's daughter. They became the second mother and daughter duo to be nominated for best actress. |

=== Best Writing (Adapted Screenplay) ===
Best Writing (Adapted Screenplay)
| Year | Film Title | Nominee(s) | Status | Milestone/Notes |
| 2002 | City of God (Cidade de Deus) | Bráulio Mantovani | Nominated | |

=== Best Animated Feature Film ===
Best Animated Feature Film
| Year | Film Title | Nominee(s) | Status | Milestone/Notes |
| 2015 | Boy and the World (O Menino e o Mundo) | Alê Abreu | Nominated | |
| 2017 | Ferdinand | Carlos Saldanha | Nominated | Saldanha was nominated with producer Lori Forte. |

=== Best International Feature Film ===
Best International Feature Film
| Year | Film Title | Direction | Status | Milestone/Notes |
| 1962 | Keeper of Promises (O Pagador de Promessas) | Anselmo Duarte | Nominated | First Brazilian production to receive a nomination at the Academy Awards. |
| 1995 | O Quatrilho | Fábio Barreto | Nominated | |
| 1997 | Four Days in September (O Que É Isso, Companheiro?) | Bruno Barreto | Nominated | |
| 1998 | Central Station (Central do Brasil) | Walter Salles | Nominated | |
| 2024 | I'm Still Here (Ainda Estou Aqui) | Walter Salles | Won | First Brazilian production to win an Academy Award. |
| 2025 | The Secret Agent (O Agente Secreto) | Kleber Mendonça Filho | Nominated | |

=== Best Documentary Feature Film ===
Best Documentary Feature Film
| Year | Film Title | Nominee(s) | Status | Milestone/Notes |
| 1981 | El Salvador: Another Vietnam | Tetê Vasconcellos | Nominated | Vasconcellos was Brazil's first director nominated for an Oscar. She was nominated with director Glenn Silber. |
| 2014 | The Salt of the Earth (O Sal da Terra) | Juliano Ribeiro Salgado | Nominated | Salgado is a French-born Brazilian director. He was nominated with producer Wim Wenders and David Rosier. |
| 2019 | The Edge of Democracy (Democracia em Vertigem) | Petra Costa; Tiago Pavan | Nominated | Costa and Pavan were nominated with producers Joanna Natasegara and Shane Boris. |

=== Best Documentary Short Film ===
Best Documentary Short Film
| Year | Film Title | Nominee(s) | Status | Milestone/Notes |
| 2021 | Lead Me Home | Pedro Kos | Nominated | Kos was nominated with director Jon Shenk. |

=== Best Live Action Short Film ===
Best Live Action Short Film
| Year | Film Title | Nominee(s) | Status | Milestone/Notes |
| 2000 | A Soccer Story (Uma História de Futebol) | Paulo Machline | Nominated | |

=== Best Animated Short Film ===
Best Animated Short Film
| Year | Film Title | Nominee(s) | Status | Milestone/Notes |
| 2003 | Gone Nutty | Carlos Saldanha | Nominated | First animated short film directed by a Latin American director to be nominated in this category. Saldanha was nominated with producer John C. Donkin. |

=== Best Music (Original Song) ===
Best Music (Original Song)
| Year | Film Title | Song | Nominee(s) | Status | Milestone/Notes |
| 1944 | Brazil | "Rio de Janeiro" | Ary Barroso | Nominated | First Brazilian and Latin-American songwriter to be nominated. Barroso was nominated with lyricist Ned Washington. |
| 2011 | Rio | "Real in Rio" | Sergio Mendes; Carlinhos Brown | Nominated | First two Brazilian songwriters to be nominated together. Brown was the first black Latin songwriter to be nominated. They were nominated with lyricist Siedah Garrett. |

=== Best Cinematography ===
Best Cinematography
| Year | Film Title | Nominee(s) | Status | Milestone/Notes |
| 2025 | Train Dreams | Adolpho Veloso | Nominated | |

=== Best Film Editing ===
Best Film Editing
| Year | Film Title | Nominee(s) | Status | Milestone/Notes |
| 2003 | City of God (Cidade de Deus) | Daniel Rezende | Nominated | |

=== Best Casting ===
Best Casting
| Year | Film Title | Nominee(s) | Status | Milestone/Notes |
| 2025 | The Secret Agent (O Agente Secreto) | Gabriel Domingues | Nominated | |

== By production ==
This section presents a list of all films that involve Brazilian co-productions and Brazilian nominees for the Oscars.

Although four Brazilian co-productions have already won an Academy Award, none of them were awarded to Brazilians. The first victory, in fact, only occurred in 2025, with the film I'm Still Here winning the Best International Film category.

Nominees who do not have Brazilian citizenship are indicated with a double dagger "‡" and with a gray background in the status.

| Year | Film title | Category | Nominee(s) | Status | Production | Ref. |
|---|---|---|---|---|---|---|
| 1944 | Brazil | Best Music (Song) for "Rio de Janeiro" | Ary Barroso ‡ Ned Washington | Nominated | United States | |
| 1959 | Black Orpheus | Best Foreign Language Film | ‡ France | Won | Brazil; France; Italy | |
| 1962 | Keeper of Promises | Best Foreign Language Film | Brazil | Nominated | Brazil | |
| 1978 | Raoni | Best Documentary (Feature) | ‡ Jean-Pierre Dutilleux ‡ Barry Williams ‡ Michel Gast | Nominated | Belgium; Brazil; France | |
| 1981 | El Salvador: Another Vietnam | Best Documentary (Feature) | ‡ Glenn Silber; Tetê Vasconcellos | Nominated | United States | |
| 1985 | Kiss of the Spider Woman | Best Picture | ‡ David Weisman | Nominated | Brazil; United States | |
| 1985 | Kiss of the Spider Woman | Best Directing | Héctor Babenco | Nominated | Brazil; United States | |
| 1985 | Kiss of the Spider Woman | Best Actor in a Leading Role | ‡ William Hurt | Won | Brazil; United States | |
| 1985 | Kiss of the Spider Woman | Best Writing (Screenplay Based on Material from Another Medium) | ‡ Leonard Schrader | Nominated | Brazil; United States | |
| 1995 | O Quatrilho | Best Foreign Language Film | Brazil | Nominated | Brazil | |
| 1997 | Four Days in September | Best Foreign Language Film | Brazil | Nominated | Brazil | |
| 1998 | Central Station | Best Actress in a Leading Role | Fernanda Montenegro | Nominated | Brazil; France | |
| 1998 | Central Station | Best Foreign Language Film | Brazil | Nominated | Brazil; France | |
| 2000 | A Soccer Story | Best Short Film (Live Action) | Paulo Machline | Nominated | Brazil | |
| 2002 | City of God | Best Directing | Fernando Meirelles | Nominated | Brazil | |
| 2002 | City of God | Best Writing (Adapted Screenplay) | Bráulio Mantovani | Nominated | Brazil | |
| 2002 | City of God | Best Cinematography | ‡ César Charlone | Nominated | Brazil | |
| 2002 | City of God | Best Film Editing | Daniel Rezende | Nominated | Brazil | |
| 2003 | Gone Nutty | Best Short Film (Animated) | Carlos Saldanha ‡ John C. Donkin | Nominated | United States | |
| 2004 | The Motorcycle Diaries | Best Writing (Adapted Screenplay) | ‡ José Rivera | Nominated | Argentina; Brazil; Chile; France; Germany; Peru; United Kingdom; United States | |
| 2004 | The Motorcycle Diaries | Best Music (Original Song) for "Al otro lado del río" | ‡ Jorge Drexler | Won | Argentina; Brazil; Chile; France; Germany; Peru; United Kingdom; United States | |
| 2010 | Waste Land | Best Documentary (Feature) | ‡ Lucy Walker ‡ Angus Aynsley | Nominated | Brazil; United Kingdom | |
| 2011 | Rio | Best Music (Original Song) for "Real in Rio" | Sérgio Mendes; Carlinhos Brown ‡ Siedah Garrett | Nominated | United States | |
| 2014 | The Salt of the Earth | Best Documentary (Feature) | Juliano Ribeiro Salgado ‡ Wim Wenders ‡ David Rosier | Nominated | Brazil; France; Italy | |
| 2015 | Boy and the World | Best Animated Feature Film | Alê Abreu | Nominated | Brazil | |
| 2017 | Call Me by Your Name | Best Picture | ‡ Peter Spears ‡ Luca Guadagnino ‡ Émilie Georges ‡ Marco Morabito | Nominated | Brazil; France; Italy; United States | |
| 2017 | Call Me by Your Name | Best Actor in a Leading Role | ‡ Timothée Chalamet | Nominated | Brazil; France; Italy; United States | |
| 2017 | Call Me by Your Name | Best Writing (Adapted Screenplay) | ‡ James Ivory | Won | Brazil; France; Italy; United States | |
| 2017 | Call Me by Your Name | Best Music (Original Song) for "Mystery of Love" | ‡ Sufjan Stevens | Nominated | Brazil; France; Italy; United States | |
| 2017 | Ferdinand | Best Animated Feature Film | Carlos Saldanha ‡ Lori Forte | Nominated | United States | |
| 2019 | The Edge of Democracy | Best Documentary (Feature) | Petra Costa ‡ Joanna Natasegara ‡ Shane Boris; Tiago Pavan | Nominated | Brazil | |
| 2021 | Lead Me Home | Best Documentary (Short Subject) | Pedro Kos ‡ Jon Shenk | Nominated | United States | |
| 2024 | I'm Still Here | Best Picture | Maria Carlota Bruno; Rodrigo Teixeira | Nominated | Brazil; France | |
| 2024 | I'm Still Here | Best Actress in a Leading Role | Fernanda Torres | Nominated | Brazil; France | |
| 2024 | I'm Still Here | Best International Feature Film | Brazil | Won | Brazil; France | |
| 2026 | Train Dreams | Best Cinematography | Adolpho Veloso | Nominated | United States | |
| 2026 | The Secret Agent | Best Picture | ‡ Emilie Lesclaux | Nominated | Brazil; France; Germany; Netherlands | |
| 2026 | The Secret Agent | Best Actor in a Leading Role | Wagner Moura | Nominated | Brazil; France; Germany; Netherlands | |
| 2026 | The Secret Agent | Best International Feature Film | Brazil | Nominated | Brazil; France; Germany; Netherlands | |
| 2026 | The Secret Agent | Best Casting | Gabriel Domingues | Nominated | Brazil; France; Germany; Netherlands | |
