= List of Udo Kier performances =

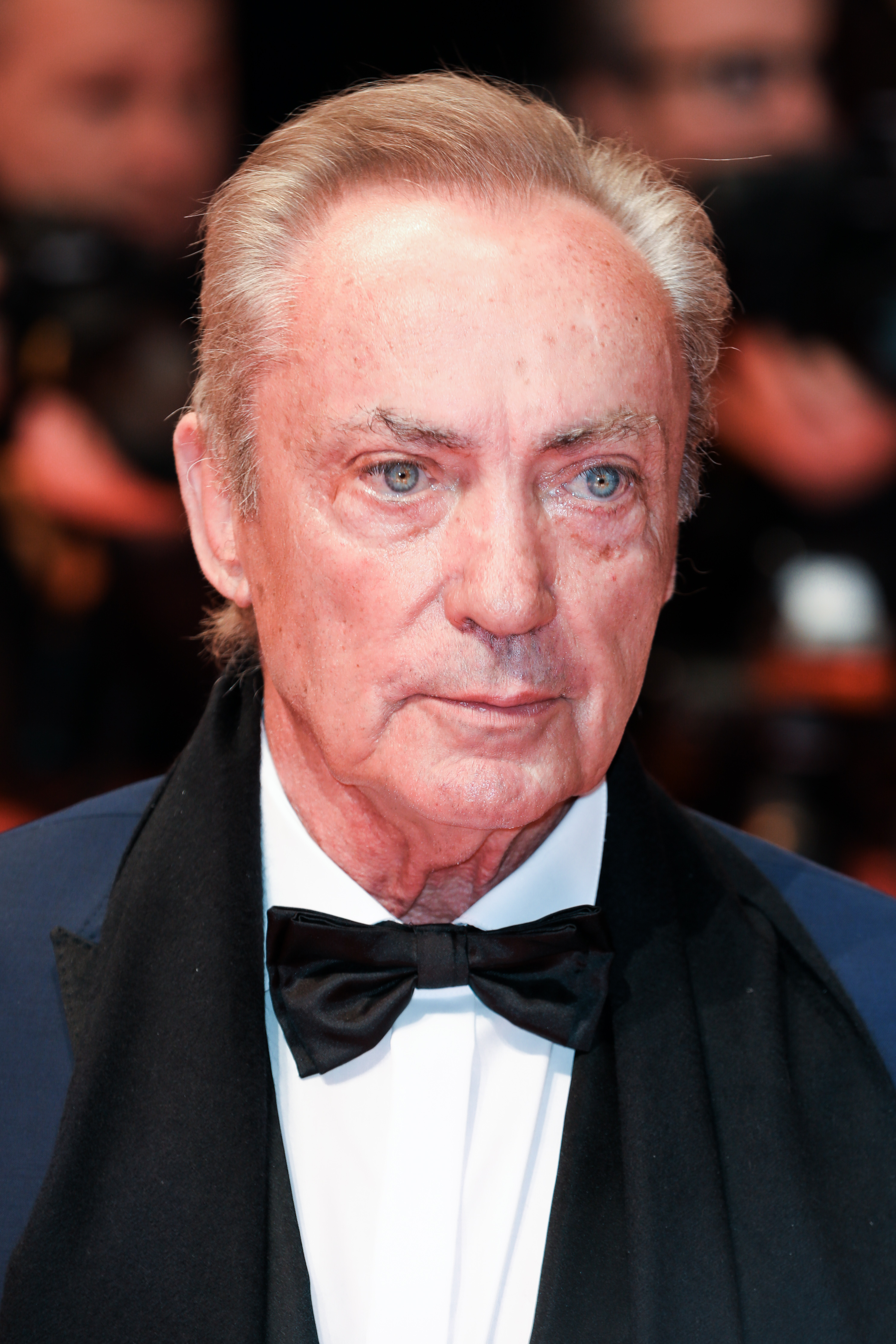
Kier at the 2019 Berlin Film Festival

This article presents the film, television, video game, and music video credits of German actor Udo Kier, who played a diverse range of character parts in both mainstream and arthouse fare.

== Filmography ==
=== Film ===
| Year | Title | Role | Notes | Ref. |
|---|---|---|---|---|
| 1966 | Road to Saint Tropez | Boy | Short film | |
| 1968 | Shameless | Alexander Pohlmann | | |
| 1969 | La stagione dei sensi | Luca | | |
| 1970 | Mark of the Devil | Count Christian von Meruh | | |
| 1971 | Oi Erotomaneis | Tonis Theodorou | | |
| 1971 | Provocation | Angelos | | |
| 1972 | The Salzburg Connection | Anton | | |
| 1973 | Flesh for Frankenstein | Baron von Frankenstein | | |
| 1973 | Pan | Pilgrim of Death | | |
| 1974 | Blood for Dracula | Count Dracula | | |
| 1975 | The Last Word | Raimund | | |
| 1975 | Story of O | René | | |
| 1976 | Exposé | Paul Martin | | |
| 1976 | Spermula | Werner | | |
| 1976 | Goldflocken | Franzl | | |
| 1977 | Suspiria | Dr. Frank Mandel | Uncredited | |
| 1977 | Belcanto oder Darf eine Nutte schluchzen? | Poulailler | | |
| 1978 | The Fifth Commandment | Peter Dümmel | | |
| 1979 | The Third Generation | Edgar Gast | | |
| 1979 | Hungarian Rhapsody | Poór | | |
| 1980 | Narcissus and Psyche | Laci Tóth | | |
| 1980 | Lulu | Jack the Ripper | | |
| 1981 | Docteur Jekyll et les femmes | Dr. Henry Jekyll | | |
| 1981 | Lola | Waiter | Uncredited; also production designer | |
| 1981 | Lili Marleen | Drewitz | | |
| 1983 | The Roaring Fifties | Fromm | | |
| 1983 | The Island of the Bloody Plantation | Hermano | | |
| 1983 | Pankow '95 | Johann Wolfgang Amadeus Zart | | |
| 1984 | Hur und heilig | Friedhelm | | |
| 1985 | Seduction: The Cruel Woman | Gregor | | |
| 1985 | Die Einsteiger | Graf Frackstein | | |
| 1985 | The Invincible | Argon | | |
| 1986 | Egomania – Insel ohne Hoffnung | Baron Tante Teufel | | |
| 1987 | Epidemic | Himself | | |
| 1988 | Another Way: D-Kikan-Joho | Hansman | | |
| 1988 | Mother's Mask | Herr Seidler | | |
| 1989 | 100 Jahre Adolf Hitler – Die letzte Stunde im Führerbunker | Adolf Hitler | | |
| 1990 | The German Chainsaw Massacre | Jonny | Also assistant director | |
| 1991 | My Own Private Idaho | Hans | | |
| 1991 | Europa | Lawrence Hartmann | | |
| 1992 | Terror 2000 – Intensivstation Deutschland | Jablo | | |
| 1993 | Josh and S.A.M. | Salon Manager | | |
| 1993 | For Love or Money | Mr. Himmelman | | |
| 1993 | Even Cowgirls Get the Blues | Commercial Director | | |
| 1993 | Three Shake-a-Leg Steps to Heaven | Edouard Müllendorf | | |
| 1994 | Ace Ventura: Pet Detective | Ron Camp | | |
| 1994 | Rotwang muß weg! | Arthur Eigenrauch | | |
| 1994 | Der unbekannte Deserteur | Der Alte | | |
| 1995 | A Trick of Light | Max Skladanowsky | | |
| 1995 | Johnny Mnemonic | Ralfi | | |
| 1995 | Ausgestorben | York Cortex | Short film | |
| 1995 | Over My Dead Body | Killer | | |
| 1995 | Extinct | York Cortex | Short film | |
| 1995 | Dog Daze | Erich von Stroheim | Short film | |
| 1996 | Barb Wire | "Curly" | | |
| 1996 | United Trash | UNO-General Werner Brenner | | |
| 1996 | Breaking the Waves | Sadistic Sailor | | |
| 1996 | Lea | Block | | |
| 1996 | The Adventures of Pinocchio | Lorenzini | | |
| 1997 | The End of Violence | Zoltan Kovacs | | |
| 1997 | Die 120 Tage von Bottrop | Udo Kier | | |
| 1997 | Betty | Vincent Lord | | |
| 1997 | Prince Valiant | Sligon | | |
| 1998 | Armageddon | Psychologist | | |
| 1998 | There's No Fish Food in Heaven | Rocky | | |
| 1998 | Blade | Gitano Dragonetti | | |
| 1998 | Life in the Fast Lane | Rocky | | |
| 1998 | Stingers | | | |
| 1998 | Immaculate Springs | Hans | | |
| 1999 | End of Days | Dr. Abel | | |
| 1999 | Spy Games | Ivan Bliniak | | |
| 1999 | The Debtors | Drag Mabel | | |
| 1999 | Possessed | Vincent | | |
| 1999 | Under the Palms | Ludwig | | |
| 1999 | The New Adventures of Pinocchio | Madame Flambeau / Lorenzini | | |
| 2000 | Shadow of the Vampire | Albin Grau | | |
| 2000 | Dancer in the Dark | Dr. Porkorny | | |
| 2000 | Red Letters | George Kessler | | |
| 2000 | Just One Night | Walter Lert | | |
| 2000 | Doomsdayer | Max Gast | | |
| 2001 | Critical Mass | Samson | | |
| 2001 | Die Gottesanbeterin | Julius Quellenreich | | |
| 2001 | Invincible | Count Helldorf | | |
| 2001 | Double Deception | Vincent | | |
| 2001 | Megiddo: The Omega Code 2 | The Guardian | | |
| 2001 | All the Queen's Men | General Landssdorf | | |
| 2001 | The Last Minute | Nazi Fashion Shooter | | |
| 2001 | Revelation | Grand Master | | |
| 2001 | Auf Herz und Nieren | "Doc" | | |
| 2002 | FeardotCom | Polidori | | |
| 2002 | Pigs Will Fly | Onkel Max | | |
| 2002 | Mrs Meitlemeihr | Hitler / Mrs. Meitlemeihr | Short film | |
| 2003 | Dogville | The Man in the Coat | | |
| 2003 | Love Object | Radley | | |
| 2003 | Gate to Heaven | Joachim Nowak | | |
| 2004 | Paranoia 1.0 | Derrick | | |
| 2004 | Jargo | Jargo's Father | | |
| 2004 | Sawtooth | Reverend Cain | | |
| 2004 | Modigliani | Max Jacob | | |
| 2004 | Evil Eyes | George | Direct-to-video | |
| 2004 | Surviving Christmas | Heinrich | | |
| 2005 | Headspace | Reverend Karl Hartman | | |
| 2005 | One More Round | Lance Wallace | | |
| 2005 | Wit's End | The Stranger | | |
| 2005 | Manderlay | Mr. Kirspe | | |
| 2005 | BloodRayne | Regal Monk | | |
| 2006 | Pray for Morning | Edouard Leopold Edu | | |
| 2006 | Holly | Klaus | | |
| 2006 | Crusade in Jeans | Dr. Lawerence | | |
| 2007 | Fall Down Dead | Picasso Killer / Aaron Garvey | Also associate producer | |
| 2007 | Grindhouse | Franz Hess | Segment: "Werewolf Women of the SS" | |
| 2007 | Halloween | Morgan Walker | | |
| 2007 | Children of Wax | P | | |
| 2007 | Mother of Tears | Father Johannes | | |
| 2007 | Pars: Operation Cherry | Klaus Kayman | | |
| 2007 | Tell | Hermann Gessler | | |
| 2008 | Far Cry | Dr. Lucas Krieger | | |
| 2008 | 1½ Knights – In Search of the Ravishing Princess Herzelinde | Count Luipold Trumpf | | |
| 2009 | Lulu and Jimi | Schultz | | |
| 2009 | House of Boys | Madame | | |
| 2009 | Soul Kitchen | Herr Jung | | |
| 2009 | Metropia | Ivan Bahn | Voice | |
| 2009 | My Son, My Son, What Have Ye Done? | Lee Meyers | | |
| 2010 | Life Is Too Long | Tabatabai | | |
| 2011 | Keyhole | Dr. Lemke | | |
| 2011 | Graf Karpatovicz and the Blonde Bite | Graf Karpatovicz | Short film | |
| 2011 | The Sky Has Four Corners | Graf Karpatovicz | | |
| 2011 | Gorunmeyen | Bartok | | |
| 2011 | Melancholia | Wedding Planner | | |
| 2011 | The Theatre Bizarre | Peg Poett | | |
| 2011 | UFO in Her Eyes | Steve Frost | | |
| 2011 | The Berlin Project | Guru | | |
| 2012 | Iron Sky | Wolfgang Kortzfleisch | | |
| 2012 | Unlocking Passages | The Actor | Short film | |
| 2012 | The Lords of Salem | Witchunter | Uncredited | |
| 2012 | Night of the Templar | Father Paul | | |
| 2013 | Heather's Dream | Doctor | Short film | |
| 2013 | The Girl behind the White Picket Fence | The Shaman / The Doctor | | |
| 2013 | Nymphomaniac | The Waiter | | |
| 2014 | Beethoven's Treasure Tail | The Real Fritz Bruchschnauser | Direct-to-video | |
| 2014 | The Editor | Dr. Casini | | |
| 2015 | Coconut Hero | Mr. Morrow (Therapist) | | |
| 2015 | Get Well Soon: It's Love | Man | Short film | |
| 2015 | Johnny Walker | Fyodor | Voice | |
| 2015 | Shanzo (Teaser) | Jago | Short film | |
| 2015 | The Forbidden Room | Count Yugh / The Butler / The Dead Father / Guard / Pharmacist | | |
| 2015 | Zero | The Lord of the World | | |
| 2016 | Courier X | Nathan Vogel | | |
| 2016 | Seances | Actor | Short film | |
| 2016 | Brother | Frank Solek | | |
| 2017 | Downsizing | Joris Konrad | | |
| 2017 | Brawl in Cell Block 99 | Placid Man | | |
| 2018 | American Animals | Mr. Van Der Hoek | | |
| 2018 | Don't Worry, He Won't Get Far on Foot | Hans | | |
| 2018 | Daughter of Mine | Bruno | | |
| 2018 | Puppet Master: The Littlest Reich | André Toulon | | |
| 2018 | Ulysses: A Dark Odyssey | Alcyde | | |
| 2018 | Dragged Across Concrete | Friedrich | | |
| 2018 | The Mountain | Frederick | | |
| 2019 | American Exit | Anton | | |
| 2019 | Iron Sky: The Coming Race | Wolfgang Kortzfleisch / Adolf Hitler | | |
| 2019 | Holy Beasts | Henry | | |
| 2019 | Bacurau | Michael | | |
| 2019 | The Painted Bird | Miller | | |
| 2019 | The Barefoot Emperor | Dr. Otto Kroll | | |
| 2019 | Skin Walker | Claus | | |
| 2020 | Last Moment of Clarity | Ivan | | |
| 2021 | The Blazing World | Lained | | |
| 2021 | Haymaker | Lained | | |
| 2021 | Swan Song | Pat Pitsenbarger | | |
| 2021 | Chompy | Chompy | Voice | |
| 2022 | My Neighbor Adolf | Mr. Herzog | | |
| 2022 | A E I O U: A Quick Alphabet of Love | Michel | | |
| 2022 | 13 Tracks to Frighten Agatha Black | Opening Narration | Voice | |
| 2024 | Skeletons in the Closet | Luc | | |
| 2025 | By Design | Aldo Fabbri | | |
| 2025 | Bad Painter | Albert Oehlen | | |
| 2025 | The Secret Agent | Hans | | |
| 2026 | Return from Tomorrow | Tim Senior | Posthumous release | |

=== Television ===
| Year | Title | Role | Notes | Ref. |
|---|---|---|---|---|
| 1973 | Sonderdezernat K1 | Harry Gätjens | Episode: "Kassensturz um Mitternacht" | |
| 1973 | Joseph Balsamo | Gilbert | 7 episodes | |
| 1973 | Olifant | Olifant / Edwin | Television film | |
| 1977 | The Stationmaster's Wife | Schafftaler | Television film; also assistant director | |
| 1979 | Victor | Popstar | Television film | |
| 1980 | Berlin Alexanderplatz | Young Man In The Bar | 2 episodes | |
| 1986 | Der Fahnder | Uli Weber | Episode: "Ein König ohne Reich" | |
| 1986 | Kir Royal – Aus dem Leben eines Klatschreporters | Holger | Episode: "Adieu Claire" | |
| 1986 | Am nächsten Morgen kehrte der Minister nicht an seinen Arbeitsplatz zurück | Minister / Kali | Television film | |
| 1988 | Medea | Jason | Television film | |
| 1992 | Tod eines Weltstars | Weltstar Udo Kier | Television film | |
| 1993 | Red Shoe Diaries | Fashion Designer | Episode: "Runway" | |
| 1993 | seaQuest DSV | Dr. Guy Peche | Episode: "Give me Liberté" | |
| 1993 | Jack Reed: Badge of Honor | Giles Marquette | Television film | |
| 1993 | Die Männer vom K3 | Heini Wohlers | Episode: "Tanz auf dem Seil" | |
| 1993 | Das Double | Zahnartz | Television film | |
| 1994 | Doppelter Einsatz | König | Episode: "Feuerzauber" | |
| 1994 | Rosa Roth | Ommer | Episode: "In Liebe und Tod" | |
| 1994, 1997, 2022 | The Kingdom | Åge Krüger / Little Brother / Frederik / Big Brother | Miniseries; 8 episodes | |
| 1995 | Unter Druck | | Television film | |
| 1996 | Tracey Takes On... | Klaus | Episode: "Death" | |
| 1996 | Nash Bridges | Wolfgang Herzog | Episode: "Aloha Nash" | |
| 1996 | The Great War and the Shaping of the 20th Century | Armin T. Wegner / Rudolf G. Binding | Voices; Documentary series | |
| 1996, 1999 | The Sentinel | Klaus Zeller | 2 episodes | |
| 1996, 2009 | Tatort | Beethoven / Hans-Rudi Dreher | 2 episodes | |
| 1997 | Die Gang | Kapitän Schmidt | Episode: "Piraten" | |
| 1998 | Viper | Erich Geiger | Episode: "Double Team" | |
| 1998 | V.I.P. | Viktor Balek | Episode: "What to Do with Vallery When You're Dead" | |
| 1998 | Modern Vampires | Vincent | Television film | |
| 1998 | Die Diebin | Bühler | Television film | |
| 1998 | Ice | Dr. Norman Kistler | Television film | |
| 1998 | Nina - Vom Kinderzimmer ins Bordell | Bongo | Television film | |
| 1999 | Final Run | Reddick | Television film | |
| 1999 | Killer Deal | Dr. Roland Parker | Television film | |
| 2002 | Justice League | Music Master | Voice; episode: "Legends" | |
| 2002 | He Sees You When You're Sleeping | Hans Kramer | Television film | |
| 2004 | The Batman | Bert | Voice; episode: "Q&A" | |
| 2004 | Dracula 3000 | Captain Varna | Television film | |
| 2004 | 30 Days Until I'm Famous | Barry Davis | Television film | |
| 2005–2007 | Vier gegen Z | Zanrelot | 39 episodes | |
| 2005 | Masters of Horror | Bellinger | Episode: "Cigarette Burns" | |
| 2005 | Wilde Engel | Richard Voss | 4 episodes | |
| 2006 | Polizeiruf 110 | Heinrich Zermahlen | Episode: "Mit anderen Augen" | |
| 2006 | 13 Graves | Debro | Television film | |
| 2010 | Chuck | Otto Van Vogel | Episode: "Chuck Versus the Role Models" | |
| 2010–2013 | Scooby-Doo! Mystery Incorporated | Professor Pericles | Voice; 17 episodes | |
| 2011 | Borgia | Pope Innocent VIII | 3 episodes | |
| 2013–2014 | Beware the Batman | Mister Toad | Voice; 4 episodes | |
| 2015 | Altes Geld | Rolf Rauchensteiner | 8 episodes | |
| 2015 | Axe Cop | The Warden | Voice; episode: "Heads Will Roll" | |
| 2015 | Major Lazer | Head Vampire Vampire | Voice; episode: "Vampire Weekend" | |
| 2015 | Golan the Insatiable | Dylan Beekler's Backpack | Voice; episode: "Pilot" | |
| 2017 | Funny or Die Presents | Admiral Codi | Episode: "Storm: A Star Wars Indie" | |
| 2019 | M - Eine Stadt sucht einen Morder | Man In Fox Fur Coat | 6 episodes | |
| 2022 | Pitch Perfect: Bumper in Berlin | Klaus | 2 episodes | |
| 2023 | Hunters | Adolf Hitler | 6 episodes | |
| 2026 | Dark Winds | Gunthar Vaggan | 3 episodes; posthumous release | |

=== Video games ===
| Year | Title | Role | Notes | Ref. |
|---|---|---|---|---|
| 1996 | The Adventures of Pinocchio: The Video Game | Lorenzini | Voice | |
| 2000 | Command & Conquer: Red Alert 2 | Yuri / PsyCorps | Live action inserts and voice acting | |
| 2001 | Command & Conquer: Yuri's Revenge | Yuri | Live action inserts and voice acting | |
| 2008 | 1½ Knights: In Search of the Ravishing Princess Herzelinde: The Video Game | Count Luipold Trumpf | Voice | |
| 2017 | Call of Duty: WWII | Dr. Peter Straub | Voice | |
| 2022 | Martha Is Dead | Erich | Voice | |
| TBA | OD | TBA | Likeness; posthumous release | |

=== Music videos ===
| Year | Song | Artist | Role | Ref. |
|---|---|---|---|---|
| 1992 | "Erotica" | Madonna | Party Guest | |
| 1992 | "Deeper and Deeper" | Madonna | Lover | |
| 1996 | "Naked" | Goo Goo Dolls | Himself | |
| 1997 | "You Win, I Lose" | Supertramp | Party Guest | |
| 1999 | "Die Schöne und das Biest" | Rauhfaser | Der Freier | |
| 2000 | "Make Me Bad" | Korn | Commander | |
| 2001 | "Let Me Blow Ya Mind" | Eve featuring Gwen Stefani | Partyguest | |
| 2001 | "Deep Down Below" | RMB | Dr. Wagner | |
| 2012 | "Prayer" | Terranova | Himself - Musician | |
