= Die Serpentintänzerin =

- Serpentintänzerin (1895)
- Directed by: Max Skladanowsky
- Produced by: Max Skladanowsky
- Cinematography: Max Skladanowsky
- Release date: November 1, 1895
- Running time: 6 seconds
- Country: German Empire
- Language: Silent

Die Serpentintänzerin (also known as Serpentinen Tanz) is an 1895 German short black-and-white silent documentary film, directed and produced by Max Skladanowsky, one of the German-born brothers responsible for inventing the Bioscop.

It was one of a series of films produced to be projected by a magic lantern and formed part of the Wintergarten Performances, the first projections of film in Europe to a paying audience. The film titles for the initial program were: Italienischer Bauerntanz, Komisches Reck, Serpentinen Tanz, Der Jongleur Paul Petras, Das Boxende Känguruh, Akrobatisches Potpourri, Kamarinskaja, Ringkampf and Apotheose. Each film lasted approximately six seconds and would be repeated several times.

In 1995 this film was incorporated into Die Gebrüder Skladanowsky, a drama telling the story of the Skladanowsky Brothers and the early days of German film projection.
