= David Rosier =

French scriptwriter and film producer

- Born: December 8, 1973 (age 52); France
- Occupations: Film producer, scriptwriter
- Notable work: The Salt of the Earth, Pope Francis: A Man of His Word

David Rosier is a French scriptwriter and film producer.

== Life and work ==
Rosier graduated with a Masters in Philosophy at Paris X Nanterre University. He started as a freelance script reader and co-wrote several screenplays, including Manzanar Mangrove (2002) and La Clef des Songes (2003). He was also an assistant director for several television shows, including Caravane de Nuit (France2) and started working in production in 2004.

He founded in 2006 his first production company, Moondog Production, in which he developed a documentary series for Arte in 2008, Passeurs D'Univers. He produced over a hundred commercials, educational films, and interactive experiences for institutions and corporations (Generali, Louis Vuitton, AT&T, etc.).

As he is involved in preserving nature and indigenous peoples' rights, he co-created 2009 the NGO Nature Rights.

In 2011, he created Decia Films and produced his first feature film, The Salt of the Earth, which was co-directed by Wim Wenders and Juliano Ribeiro Salgado, in which he is also a writer. The film won a Jury Prize in Cannes at Un Certain Regard in 2014. The film won the Cesar for Best Documentary and was nominated for an Oscar for Best Documentary Film the same year.

In 2015, he studied at the CEEA in Paris to complete his storytelling skills before producing and co-writing his second feature film for cinema, Pope Francis: A Man of His Word, directed by Wim Wenders.

In 2019, David Rosier founded the Reveal Media Group, which includes Decia Films (film production), Foehn Films (advertising) and Capstan Films Services (executive production). The group is a signatory to the Ecoprod charter.

== Filmography ==
- 2014 - The Salt of the Earth (producer and scriptwriter)
- 2018: Pope Francis - A Man of His Word (producer and scriptwriter)

== Awards and nominations ==
Together with directors Wim Wenders and Juliano Ribeiro Salgado, he is nominated for their documentary The Salt of the Earth in the category of Best Documentary at the Oscars 2015. This film won the César for best documentary in 2015.
