= Les Disques Du Soleil Et De L'Acier =

French record label

Les Disques Du Soleil Et De L'Acier (Translated from French as Sun and Steel Records), or DSA, is a French record label created in the '80s by Gerard Nguyen, already author of the fanzine Atem, and producer of the duo Kas Product. Still active today, and renowned for the discovery of artists such as Pascal Comelade, Ulan Bator, Sylvain Chauveau, ...

The name of the label is directly inspired by one of Yukio Mishima's essay published in 1968, Taiyō to tetsu (Sun and Steel).

- Je veux voir la Mer (1982) (CD, Album) Laurent Petitgand with Dick Tracy Les Disques Du Soleil Et De L'Acier
- Slim Bretzel (1983) (Maxi 45t) Laurent Petitgand with Dick Tracy Les Disques Du Soleil Et De L'Acier
- Tokyo-Ga (1985) (CD, Album) Laurent Petitgand with Dick Tracy Les Disques Du Soleil Et De L'Acier
