= Akrobatisches Potpourri =

1895 film

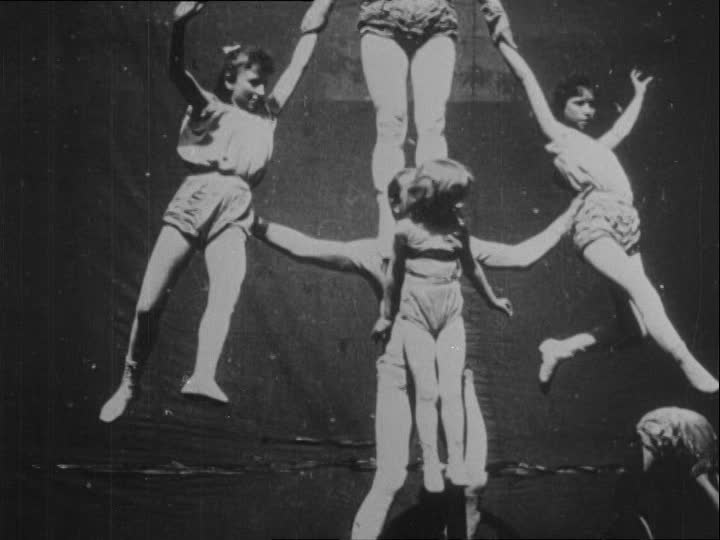
- Directed by: Max Skladanowsky; Emil Skladanowsky
- Produced by: Max Skladanowsky
- Starring: Grunato family
- Cinematography: Max Skladanowsky
- Distributed by: Grunato GmbH
- Release date: 1 November 1895
- Running time: 6 seconds
- Country: German Empire
- Language: Silent

Akrobatisches Potpourri (1895)

Akrobatisches Potpourri (also known as Gymnastikerfamilie Grunato) is an 1895 German short black-and-white silent documentary film directed and produced by Max and Emil Skladanowsky and starring the Grunato family. It is one of the first German produced films.

Filmed in the park of the Berlin-Moabit Public Theatre this short film shows the balancing act performance of this family of 8 performers.

It was one of a series of films produced to be projected by a magic lantern and formed part of the Wintergarten Performances, the first projections of film in Europe to a paying audience. The film titles for the initial program were: Italienischer Bauerntanz, Komisches Reck, Serpentinen Tanz, Der Jongleur Paul Petras, Das Boxende Känguruh, Akrobatisches Potpourri, Kamarinskaja, Ringkampf, and Apotheose. Each film lasted approximately six seconds and would be repeated several times.
