= Bauerntanz zweier Kinder =

1895 film

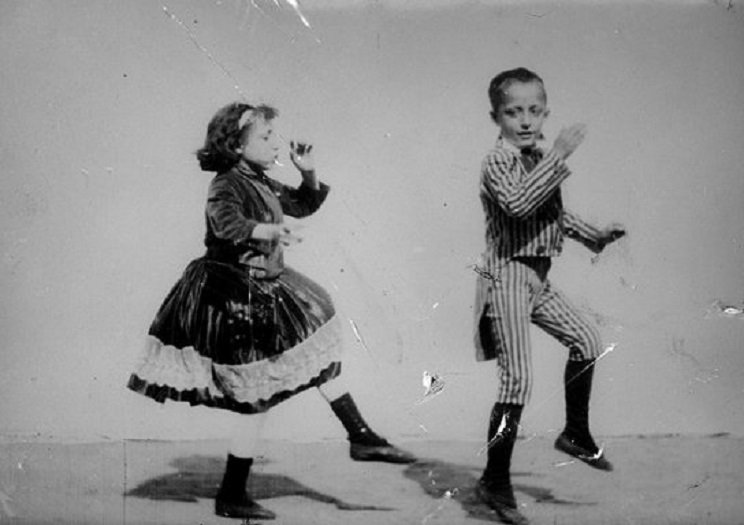
- Directed by: Max Skladanowsky
- Cinematography: Max Skladanowsky
- Distributed by: Grunato GmbH
- Release date: 2 November 1895
- Country: German Empire
- Language: Silent

Bauerntanz zweier Kinder (1895)

Bauerntanz zweier Kinder (English: Peasant dance of two children), also known as Italienischer Bauerntanz (Italian peasant dance) or Italian folk dance, is an 1895 German short black-and-white silent documentary film directed by Max Skladanowsky. The film captures two children, Ploetz and Lorella, performing a dance.

It was one of a series of films produced to be projected by a magic lantern and formed part of the Wintergarten Performances, the first projections of film in Europe to a paying audience. The film titles for the initial program were: Bauerntanz zweier Kinder, Komisches Reck, Serpentinen Tanz, Der Jongleur Paul Petras, Das Boxende Känguruh, Akrobatisches Potpourri, Kamarinskaja, Ringkampf, and Apotheose. Each film lasted approximately six seconds and would be repeated several times.
