= Adolpho Veloso =

Brazilian cinematographer (born 1989)

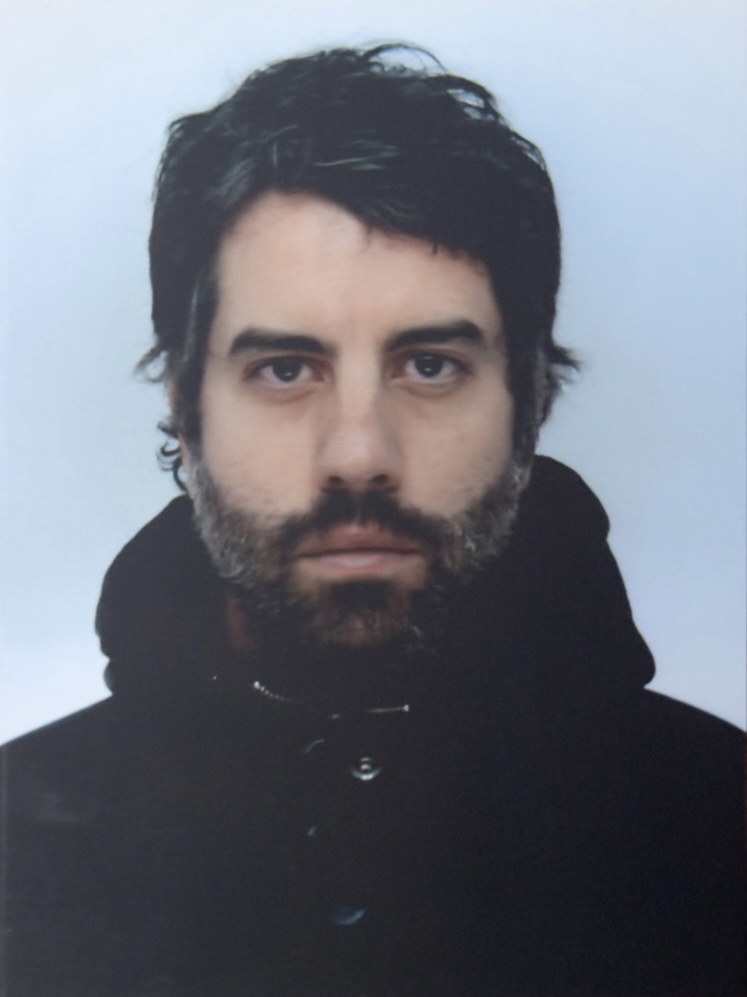
- Born: 31 May 1989 (age 37); São Paulo, Brazil
- Education: Fundação Armando Alvares Penteado
- Years active: 2012–present

Adolpho Veloso (born 31 May 1989) is a Brazilian cinematographer.

He gained international attention for his work on Train Dreams (2025), becoming the first Brazilian to be nominated for the Academy Award for Best Cinematography.

== Early life and education ==
Veloso was born and raised in São Paulo, Brazil, and developed an interest in filmmaking from a young age. He studied film at Fundação Armando Alvares Penteado.

According to Piauí, he was raised by his mother (a lawyer from Minas Gerais), has an older sister, and lost his father when he was three months old; he has also said he received support from relatives in Araguari, Minas Gerais.

== Career ==
Before focusing primarily on film work, Veloso worked extensively in advertising, music videos, short films and documentary films, which he described as an accelerated environment for technical training and experimentation. He has said he aimed to establish himself professionally in Brazil before pursuing wider international opportunities.

Since 2019 he has lived in Lisbon, Portugal.

== Style ==
His work has been described as minimalist and observational, reflecting influences from cinematographers like Gordon Willis, César Charlone and Néstor Almendros.

According to Piauí, Veloso often emphasizes natural and diegetic lighting (light sources motivated within the scene, such as lamps or fire).

== Filmography ==
Feature film

Year	Title	Director	Ref.
2015	Asco	Ale Paschoalini	
2018	Tungstênio	Heitor Dhalia	
2020	Mosquito	João Nuno Pinto	
2021	Jockey	Clint Bentley	
2021	El perfecto David	Felipe Gómez Aparicio	
2021	Rodantes	Leandro Lara	
2025	Train Dreams	Clint Bentley	
2026	Queen at Sea	Lance Hammer	
2026	Remain	M. Night Shyamalan	

Documentary film

Year	Title	Director	Ref.
2017	On Yoga: The Architecture of Peace	Heitor Dhalia	

Television

Year	Title	Director	Notes
2022	Becoming Elizabeth	Justin Chadwick	3 episodes

Music video

Year	Title	Artist(s)	Album	Ref.
2022	"Ameianoite"	Pabllo Vittar and Gloria Groove	Noitada	
2025	"Diamantes, Lágrimas e Rostos para Esquecer"	BK'	—	
2026	"Lonely in the Future"	The Strokes	Reality Awaits	

== Awards and nominations ==
Year	Award	Category	Title	Result
2022	American Society of Cinematographers	Spotlight Award	Jockey	Nominated
2026	Academy Awards	Best Cinematography	Train Dreams	Nominated
2026	BAFTA Awards	Best Cinematography	Train Dreams	Nominated
2026	Critics Choice Awards	Best Cinematography	Train Dreams	Won
2026	American Society of Cinematographers	Outstanding Achievement in Cinematography	Train Dreams	Nominated
2026	Film Independent Spirit Awards	Best Cinematography	Train Dreams	Won
2026	Satellite Awards	Best Cinematography	Train Dreams	Won

== See also ==
List of Brazilian Academy Award winners and nominees
