= Fred Ritchin =

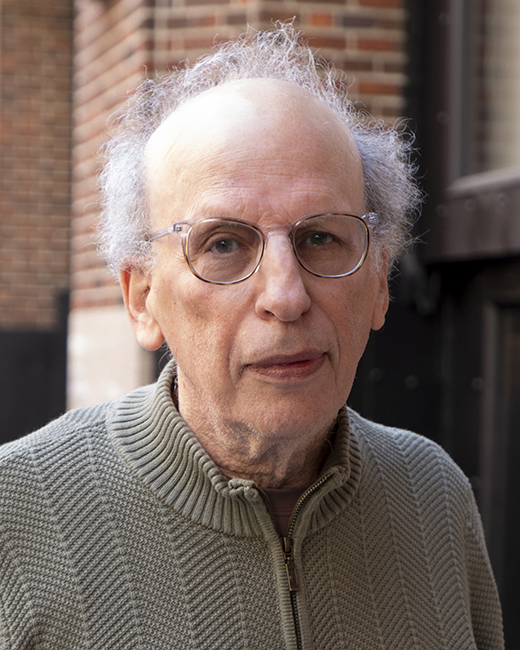
- Ritchin in 2026
- Education: Yale University
- Occupations: Writer, educator, and curator
- Notable work: In Our Own Image (1990); After Photography (2008); Bending the Frame (2013); The Synthetic Eye (2025)
- Title: Dean Emeritus, ICP School
- Website: thefifthcorner.org

Fred Ritchin is dean emeritus of the International Center of Photography (ICP) School. Ritchin was also the founding director of the Documentary Photography and Photojournalism Program at the School of ICP and was appointed dean in 2014. Prior to joining ICP, Ritchin was professor of photography and imaging at New York University's Tisch School of the Arts, and co-director of the NYU/Magnum Foundation Photography and Human Rights educational program. He has worked as the picture editor of The New York Times Magazine (1978–1982) and of Horizon magazine, executive editor of Camera Arts magazine (1982–1983), Ritchin has written and lectured internationally about the challenges and possibilities implicit in the digital revolution.

== Life and work ==
In 1994 and 1995, he conducted a research project for The New York Times on how to transform the print newspaper into a multimedia publication. Ritchin co-founded PixelPress in 1999, serving as director of an organization that has created multimedia documentary and photojournalism projects online, and collaborated with humanitarian organizations such as UNICEF, WHO, UNFPA, Crimes of War, and the Rwanda Project.

Ritchin is a prolific author and curator, focusing on digital media and the rapid changes occurring in photography. He wrote the first book on the impact of digital imaging on photography, In Our Own Image: The Coming Revolution in Photography (Aperture, 1990, 1999, 2010), which was followed by two more books on the future of imaging in the digital era, After Photography (W. W. Norton, 2008), and Bending the Frame: Photojournalism, Documentary, and the Citizen (Aperture, 2013). Ritchin has contributed articles and essays to numerous books and publications such as Aperture, Camera Arts, Mother Jones, The New York Times, Time LightBox, and the Village Voice. His curatorial projects include Contemporary Latin American Photographers at the Burden Gallery, What Matters Now: Proposals for a New Front Page at Aperture Gallery, An Uncertain Grace: The Photographs of Sebastião Salgado at the San Francisco Museum of Modern Art, and Bodies in Question at the New York Photo Festival.

Ritchin is also the founding director of PixelPress, an organization that has published multimedia projects experimenting with virtual and non-linear photojournalistic and documentary work. PixelPress has collaborated with many humanitarian organizations on issues such as a global attempt to end polio, progress towards achieving the Millennium Development Goals, the promulgation and explanation of the crimes of war, and the photographic vision of children in a Rwandan orphanage. PixelPress also featured an online publication combining documentary and new media strategies, including a collaboration with photographer Gilles Peress for The New York Times' first multimedia piece, entitled Bosnia: Uncertain Paths to Peace, which was nominated for a Pulitzer Prize in public service in 1997.

== Publications ==
=== Publications by Ritchin ===
- An Uncertain Grace: The Photographs of Sebastião Salgado (Aperture, 1990).
- In Our Own Image: The Coming Revolution in Photography (Aperture, 1990; reissued 1999).
- Co-author of An Uncertain Grace: The Photographs of Sebastiao Salgado (Aperture, 1990)
- Mexico Through Foreign Eyes, 1850-1990 (W. W. Norton, 1993).
- After Photography (W W Norton, 2008)
- Bending The Frame: Photojournalism, Documentary, and the Citizen (Aperture, 2013).
- The Synthetic Eye (Thames and Hudson, 2025)

=== Publications with contributions by Ritchin ===
- In Our Time: The World as Seen by Magnum Photographers. New York; London: W W Norton, 1989. ISBN 0-393-02767-8. With essays by William Manchester ("Images: a Wide Angle"), Jean Lacouture ("The Founders") and Ritchin ("What is Magnum?"), and "Biographical Notes and Selected Bibliographies" and "Bibliography and Chronology of Magnum" by Stuart Alexander.
- The Critical Image (1990).
- Photo Video: Photography in the Age of the Computer (1991)
- A New History of Photography (1994)
- National Geographic Photos: Milestones (1999)
- Sahel: Man in Distress (2004)
- Under Fire: Great Photographers and Writers on the Vietnam War (2005)
- Felice Beato: Photographer of the Eastern Road (2010)
- The Uncanny Familiar: Images of Terror (C/O Berlin, 2011)

== Exhibits curated ==
- Contemporary Latin American Photographers (1987)
- An Uncertain Grace: The Photographs of Sebastiao Salgado (1990)
- The Legacy of W. Eugene Smith: Twelve Photographers in the Humanistic Tradition (1991)
- Mexico Through Foreign Eyes: Photographs, 1850-1990 (1992)
- Chasing the Dream (United Nations, 2005)
- Bodies in Question (New York Photo Festival; NYU Tisch School of the Arts, 2010)
- What Matters Now? Proposals for a New Front Page (Aperture Foundation, 2011)
- Revolution: Photographs from Libya (NYU Gulf and Western Gallery, 2011)

== Awards ==
- Markle Foundation grant (1993–1994)
- Presidential Fellowship for Junior Faculty (1994)
- David Payne-Carter Award for Teaching Excellence (1995)
- Nominated for the Pulitzer Prize in Public Service by The New York Times for the Web site, "Bosnia: Uncertain Paths to Peace" (1997).
- Hasselblad Foundation Grant (1999) for future web project "Witnessing and the Web: An Experiment in Documentary Photography”
