= Sebastião Salgado =

Brazilian photographer (1944–2025)

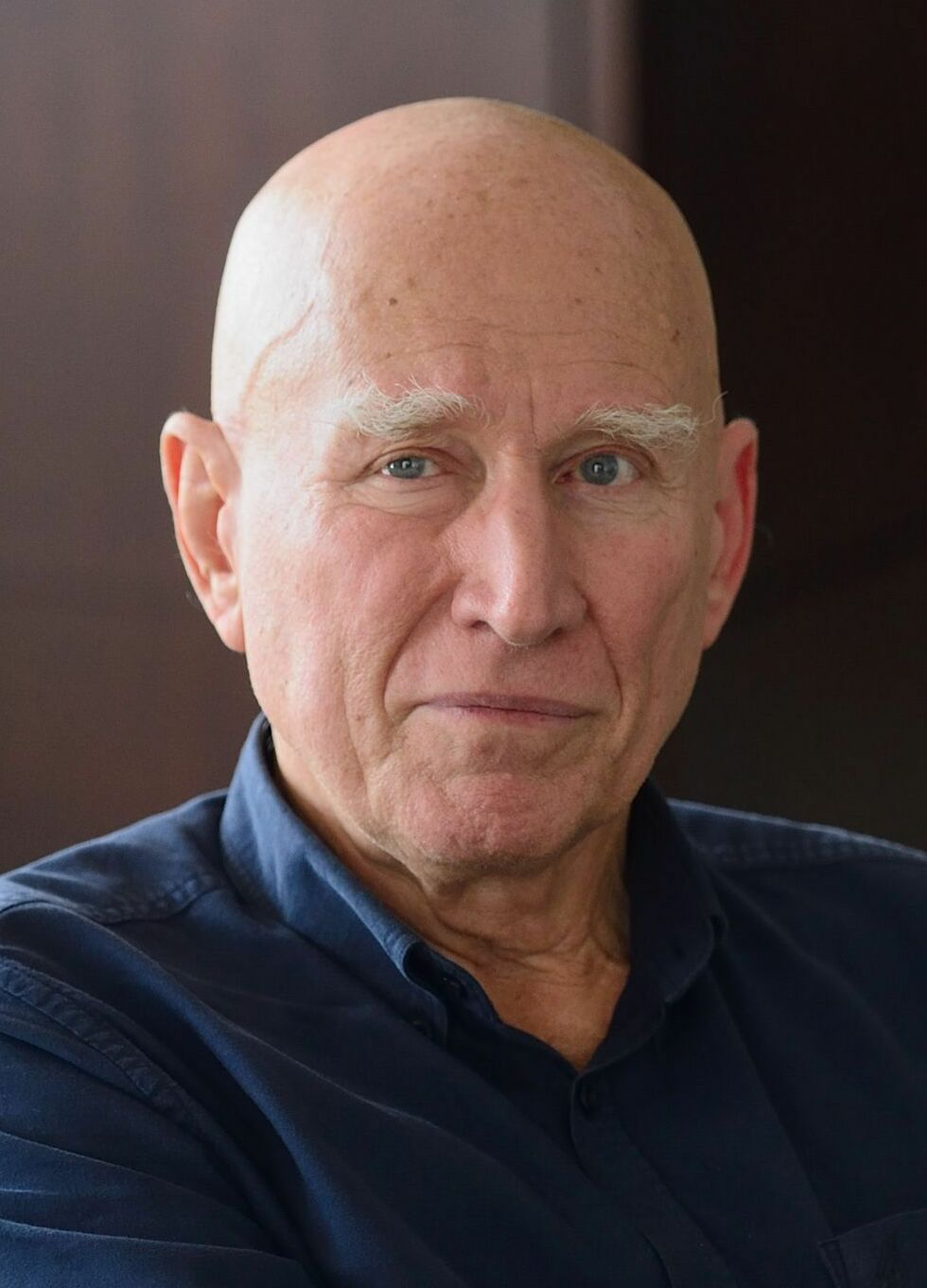
- Salgado in 2016
- Born: Sebastião Ribeiro Salgado Júnior; 8 February 1944; Aimorés, Minas Gerais, Brazil
- Died: 23 May 2025 (aged 81); Paris, France
- Occupation: Social documentary photographer
- Spouse: Lélia Wanick Salgado
- Children: 2, including Juliano Ribeiro
- Website: institutoterra.org

Signature
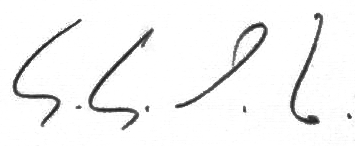

Sebastião Ribeiro Salgado Júnior (8 February 1944 – 23 May 2025) was a Brazilian social documentary photographer and photojournalist.

Salgado traveled in more than 120 countries for his photographic projects, which appeared in numerous press publications and books. Touring exhibitions of his work have been presented throughout the world.

He was a UNICEF Goodwill Ambassador. He was awarded the W. Eugene Smith Memorial Fund Grant in 1982, Foreign Honorary Membership of the American Academy of Arts and Sciences in 1992; and the Royal Photographic Society's Centenary Medal and Honorary Fellowship (HonFRPS) in 1993. He was a member of the Académie des Beaux-Arts at the Institut de France since April 2016.

== Early life and education ==
Sebastião Salgado was born on 8 February 1944, in Aimorés, in the Brazilian state of Minas Gerais. After a somewhat itinerant childhood, Salgado trained as an economist, earning a BA degree from the Federal University of Espírito Santo (UFES); a master's degree from the University of São Paulo, in 1968; and a PhD from the University of Paris, in 1971.

He began work as an economist for the International Coffee Organization and often traveled to Africa on missions for the World Bank.

== Photography ==
It was on his travels to Africa that Salgado first started seriously taking photographs. He chose to abandon a career as an economist and switched to photography in 1973, working initially on news assignments before veering more towards documentary-type work. Salgado initially worked with the photo agency Sygma and the Paris-based Gamma, but in 1979, he joined the international cooperative of photographers Magnum Photos. He left Magnum in 1994 and with his wife Lélia Wanick Salgado formed his own agency, Amazonas Images, in Paris, to represent his work. He is particularly noted for his social documentary photography of workers in less developed nations. His work resides in Paris.

Salgado worked on long-term, self-assigned projects, many of which have been published as books: The Other Americas, Sahel, Workers, Migrations, and Genesis. The aforementioned three are mammoth collections with hundreds of images each from all around the world. His most famous pictures are of a gold mine in Brazil called Serra Pelada, taken between 1986 and 1989. He was also a UNICEF Goodwill Ambassador since 2001.

Between 2004 and 2011, Salgado worked on Genesis, aiming at the presentation of the unblemished faces of nature and humanity. It consists of a series of photographs of landscapes and wildlife, as well as of human communities that continue to live in accordance with their ancestral traditions and cultures. This body of work is conceived as a potential path to humanity's rediscovery of itself in nature.

In September and October 2007, Salgado displayed his photographs of coffee workers from India, Guatemala, Ethiopia, and Brazil at the Brazilian Embassy in London. The aim of the project was to raise public awareness of the origins of the popular drink.

Salgado photographed the landscape and people of the Amazon rainforest (Amazônia) in Brazil.

Salgado's work has been described by Andrei Netto of The Guardian as an "instantly recognisable combination of black-and-white composition and dramatic lighting".

Salgado and his work are the focus of the film The Salt of the Earth (2014), directed by Wim Wenders and Salgado's son, Juliano Ribeiro Salgado, and produced by Lélia Wanick Salgado.

== Environmentalism ==
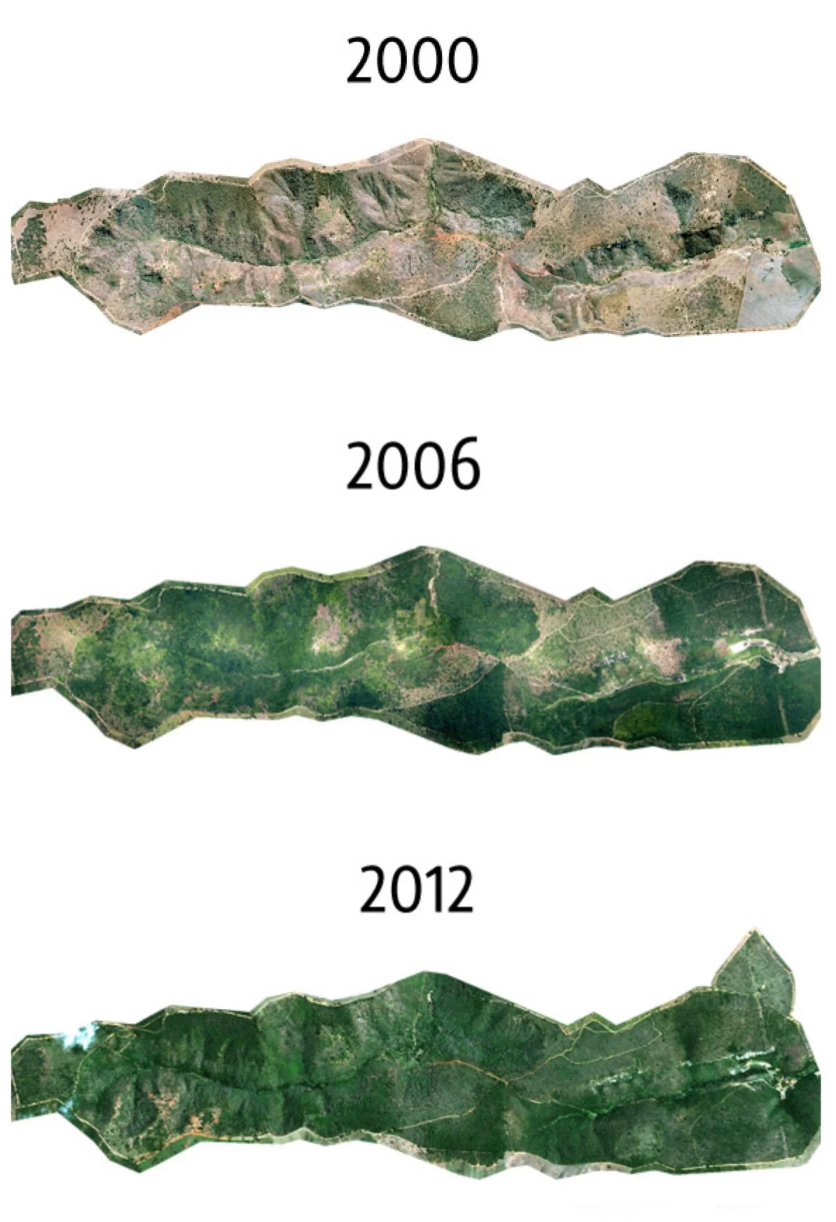
Reforestation of Fazenda Bulcão, or Bulcão Farm, by Instituto Terra

Together, Lélia and Sebastião worked since the 1990s on the restoration of a part of the Atlantic Forest in Brazil. In 1998, they succeeded in turning 17,000 acres (6,900 ha) into a nature reserve and created the Instituto Terra. The institute is dedicated to a mission of reforestation, conservation and environmental education. Book publisher Taschen supports the institute to plant one tree for each book they sell.

== Personal life and death ==
Salgado was married to Lélia Wanick Salgado and had two children, including Juliano Ribeiro Salgado.

On a 2010 trip to Indonesian New Guinea, Salgado contracted falciparum malaria, which permanently impaired his bone-marrow function. Salgado died in Paris on 23 May 2025, at the age of 81. His death was announced by Instituto Terra on the following day.

== Awards ==
- 1982: W. Eugene Smith Grant from the W. Eugene Smith Memorial Fund
- 1985: Oskar Barnack Award
- 1989: Hasselblad Award, Hasselblad Foundation, Gothenburg, Sweden
- 1992: Oskar Barnack Award
- 1992: Foreign Honorary Member of the American Academy of Arts and Sciences
- 1993: Centenary Medal from the Royal Photographic Society
- 1993: Honorary Fellowship (HonFRPS) from the Royal Photographic Society
- 1994: Grand Prix National French Ministry of Culture, Ministry of Culture (France)
- 1998: Prince of Asturias Awards, Arts category
- 1988: King of Spain International Journalism Award
- 2003: International Award from the Photographic Society of Japan
- 2007: M2-El Mundo People's Choice Award for best exhibition a PhotoEspaña, for Africa
- 2019: Peace Prize of the German Book Trade
- 2021: Crystal Award, World Economic Forum
- 2021: Praemium Imperiale
- 2024: Outstanding Contribution to Photography Sony World Photography Awards

== Honours ==
- Brazil: Commander of the Order of Rio Branco (2004)
- France: Knight of the Legion of Honour (2016)
- France: Commander of the Ordre des Arts et des Lettres (2014)
- Monaco: Knight of the Order of Cultural Merit (Monaco) (2018)

== Publications ==
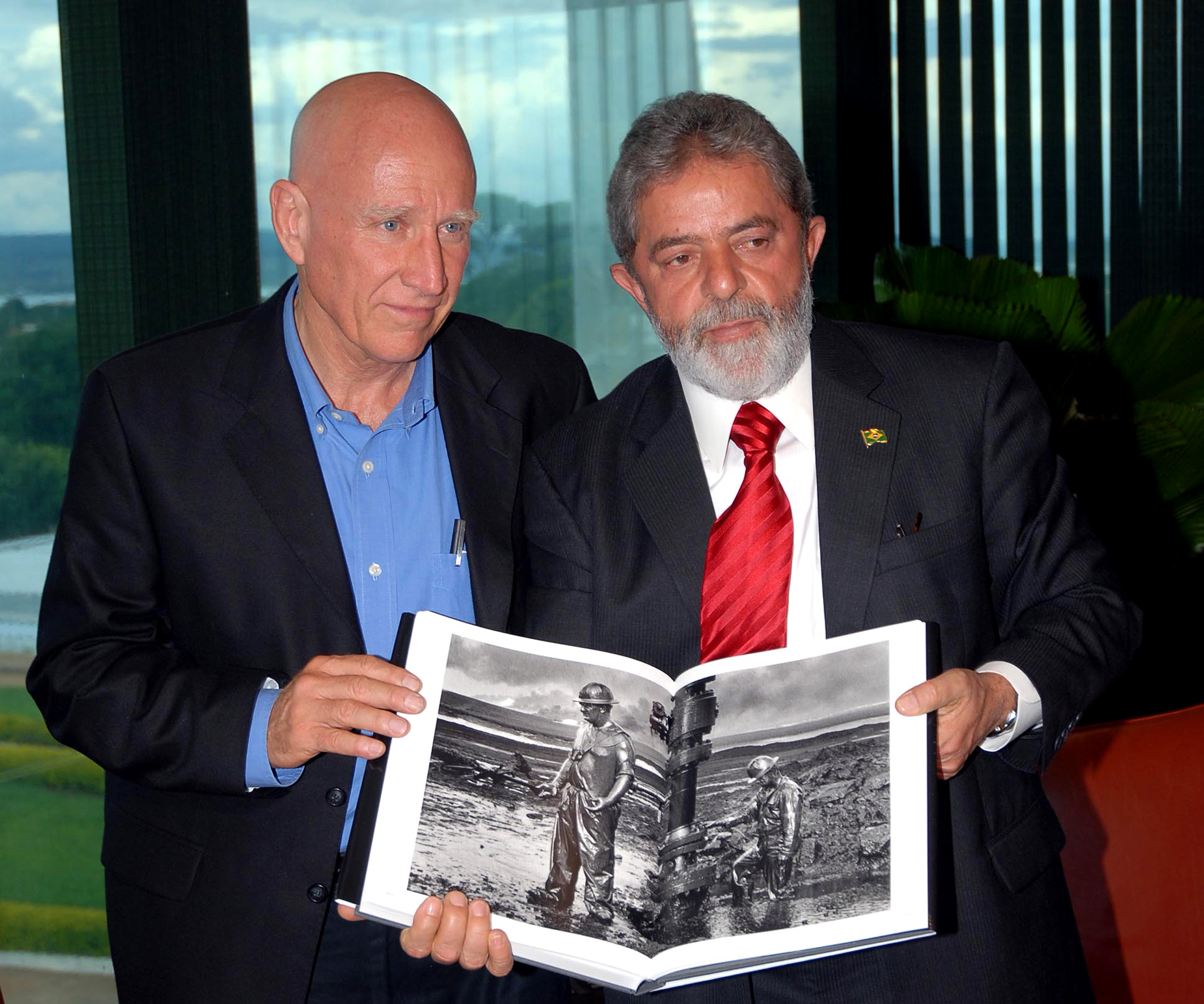
Salgado (left) gives Brazilian president Lula da Silva his new book in 2006, during Lula's first presidency.

- An Uncertain Grace. Essays by Eduardo Galeano and Fred Ritchin.
  - Salgado, Sebastião; Galeano, Eduardo; Ritchin, Fred; San Francisco Museum of Modern Art (1990). An uncertain grace. New York: Aperture Foundation. ISBN 978-0-89381-460-1. OCLC 22701623.
  - Salgado, Sebastião; Galeano, Eduardo; Ritchin, Fred (2004). Sebastião Salgado: An uncertain grace. London: Thames & Hudson. ISBN 978-0-500-28489-6. OCLC 56457689.
- Workers: Archaeology of the Industrial Age.
  - Sebastião Salgado: Workers: an archaeology of the industrial age. London: Phaidon. 1993. ISBN 978-0-7148-2931-9. OCLC 471602337.
  - Trabalho, uma arqueologia da era industrial. Portugal: Caminho. 1993. ISBN 978-972-21-0834-8. OCLC 81101769.
  - Salgado, Sebastião (2009). Trabalhadores : uma arqueologia da era industrial. São Paulo: Companhia das Letras. ISBN 978-85-7164-588-2. OCLC 859535737.
- Salgado, Sebastião; Buarque de Holanda, Francisco; Saramago, José; Landers, Clifford (1997). Terra: struggle of the landless. London: Phaidon Press. ISBN 0-7148-3636-2. OCLC 610974180.
- Salgado, Sebastião (2000). Migrations: humanity in transition. New York: Aperture. ISBN 978-0-89381-891-3. OCLC 914864396.
  - Salgado, Sebastião; Wanick Salgado, Lélia (2016). Exodus. Cologne: Taschen. ISBN 978-3-8365-6130-3. OCLC 959255065.
- The Children: Refugees and Migrants. New York: Aperture, 2000. ISBN 978-0-89381-894-4.
- Sahel: The End of the Road. Oakland, CA: University of California Press, 2004. ISBN 978-0-520-24170-1.
- Africa. Cologne: Taschen, 2007. ISBN 978-3-8365-2343-1.
- Genesis. Cologne: Taschen, 2013. ISBN 978-3-8365-3872-5.
- From my Land to the Planet. Roma: Contrasto, 2014. ISBN 978-88-6965-537-1.
- The Scent of a Dream: Travels in the World of Coffee. New York: Abrams, 2015. ISBN 978-1-4197-1921-9.
- Kuwait. A Desert on Fire. Cologne: Taschen, 2016. ISBN 978-3-8365-6125-9.
- Gold. Cologne: Taschen, 2019. Edited by Lélia Wanick Salgado. ISBN 978-3-8365-7508-9.
- Amazônia. Cologne: Taschen, 2021. Edited by Lélia Wanick Salgado. ISBN 978-3-8365-8510-1.

== Filmography ==
- The Salt of the Earth (2014). Documentary about and with Salgado, directed by Wim Wenders and Salgado's son Juliano Ribeiro Salgado.

== Exhibitions ==
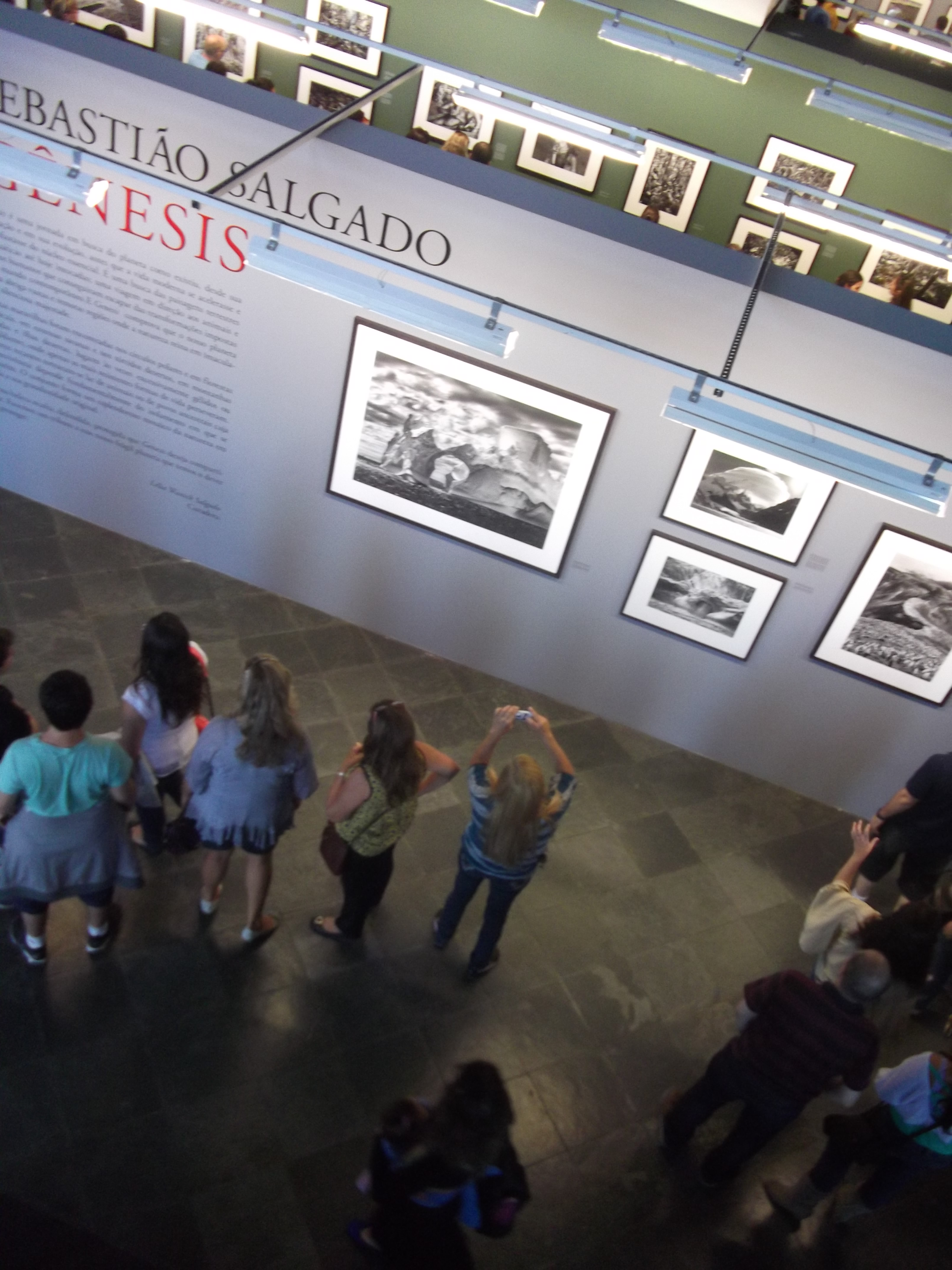
View of Salgado's Genesis exhibition in 2014

- Genesis, Royal Ontario Museum, Toronto, Canada, 2013; Natural History Museum, London, 2013; Maison Européenne de la Photographie, Paris, 2013–14; National Museum of Singapore, 2014; [[Belo Horizonte#Pal.C3.A1cio das Artes|Palácio das Artes]], Belo Horizonte, Brazil, 2014; Fotografiska Stockholm, 2014; Palazzo della Ragione, Milan, Italy, 2014; International Center of Photography, New York City, 2014–15; CaixaForum Barcelona, Barcelona, Spain, 2014–15; Sejong Center, Seoul, South Korea, 2014–15; Cordoaria Nacional, Lisbon, Portugal, 2015; CaixaForum Palma, Palma, Spain, 2015; Amerika Haus Berlin, Berlin, 2015; Power Station of Art, Shanghai, China, 2015; Kunstfoyer, Munich, Germany, 2015–16; Prague Castle, Prague, Czech Republic, 2017; Nederlands Fotomuseum, Rotterdam, Netherlands, 2017
- Déclaration, Musée de l'Homme, Paris, 2018–19
- Gold, Fotografiska Stockholm, 2019; Fotografiska Tallinn, 2020.
- Amazônia, Philharmonie de Paris, 2021; Science Museum, London, 2021–22; Science and Industry Museum, Manchester, UK, 2022 MAXXI, Rome, 2021–22; Serviço Social do Comércio, Sao Paulo, 2022–23; Museum of Tomorrow, Rio de Janeiro, 2021–22; California Science Center, Los Angeles, 2022, Teatro Fernán Gómez, Madrid, 2023–24.
- In 2025, Fotografiska Shanghai presented Retrospective, the first major posthumous retrospective of Sebastião Salgado, bringing together works from across his career including Other Americas, Sahel, Workers, Migrations, and Genesis.

== See also ==
- Pruemopterus salgadoi, an extinct species of eurypterid named after Salgado
