= Berlin Wintergarten theatre =

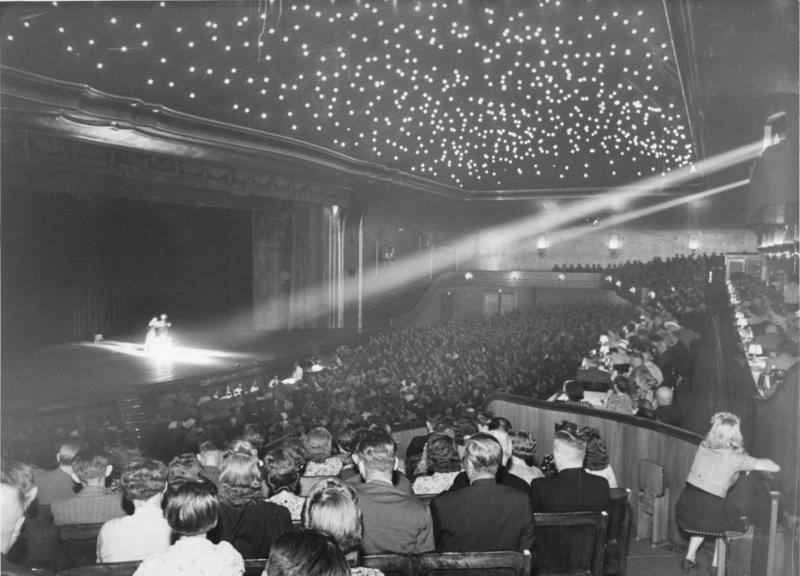
- July 1940
- Interactive map of Berlin Wintergarten theatre
- Location: Berlin, Germany
- Coordinates: 52°30′08″N 13°21′52″E
- Type: Theatre

Construction
- Opened: 1887
- Demolished: June 1944

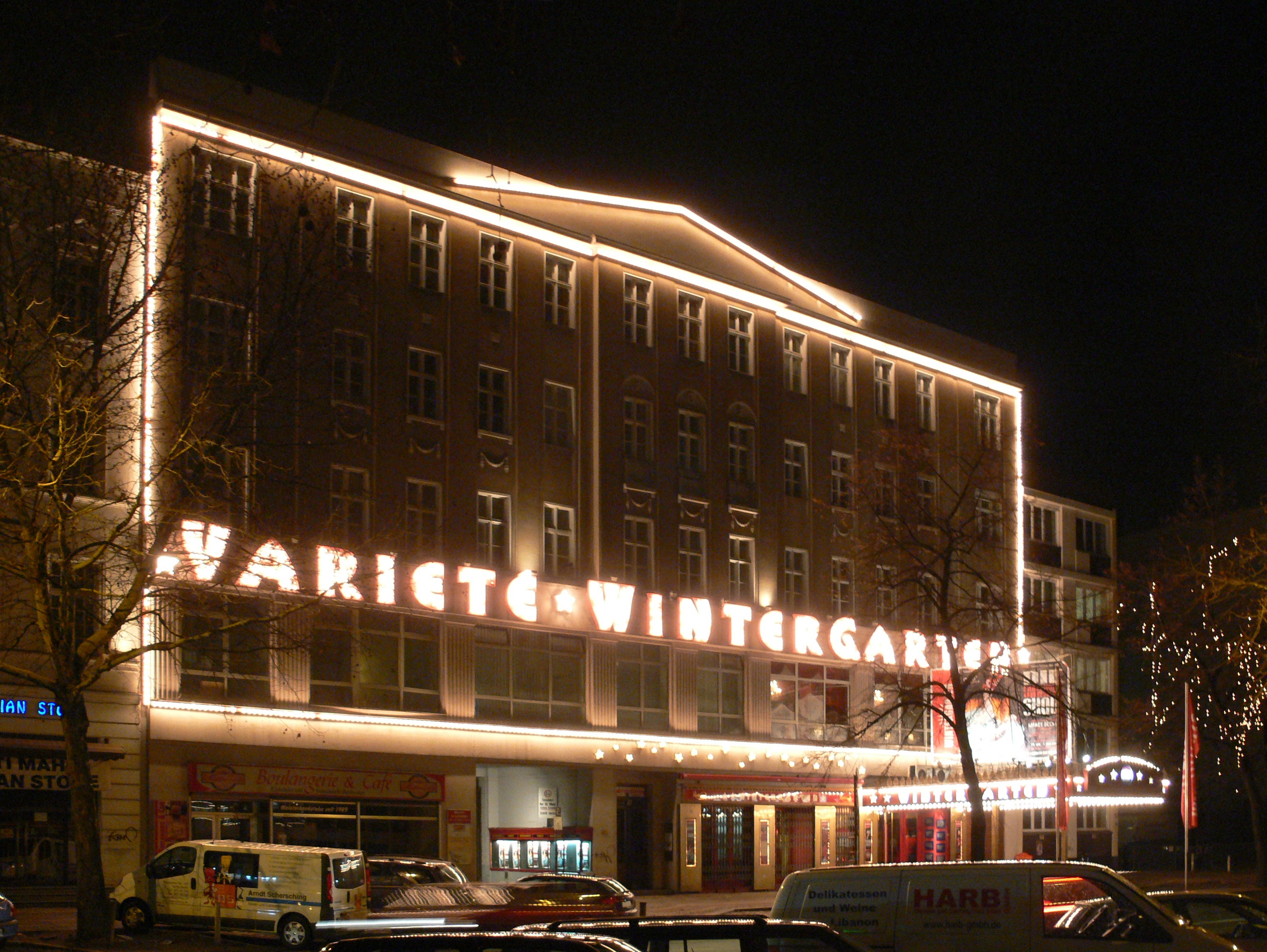
Wintergarten, Potsdamer Straße, 2010

The Berlin Wintergarten theatre was a large variety theatre in Berlin-Mitte.

It opened in 1887 and was destroyed by bombs during the World war II.

The Skladanowsky brothers showcased the first short film presentation at the theatre in 1895, making it the first Bioscop movie theater in history. Beyond a movie theatre, it was a multi-use variety theatre. As art historian Erwin Panofsky recalls, in about 1905 "there was only one obscure and faintly disreputable kino in the whole city of Berlin, bearing, for some unfathomable reason, the English name of 'The Meeting Room'."

The theatre was restarted, relocated and the title licensed in 1992. The new location is on Potsdamer Straße just south of Potsdamer Platz in Berlin.
