= The Inner Life of Martin Frost =

- Theatrical release poster
- Directed by: Paul Auster
- Screenplay by: Paul Auster
- Based on: The Book of Illusions by Paul Auster
- Produced by: Paul Auster; Paulo Branco; Yael Melamede
- Starring: David Thewlis; Irène Jacob; Michael Imperioli
- Cinematography: Christophe Beaucarne
- Edited by: Tim Squyres
- Music by: Laurent Petitgand
- Production companies: Alfama Films; Clap Filmes; Peter Newman Productions; Salty Features; Tornasol Films
- Distributed by: New Yorker Films
- Release dates: March 21, 2007 (NYC); September 7, 2007 (USA)
- Running time: 94 minutes
- Country: United States
- Language: English

The Inner Life of Martin Frost is a 2007 American romantic-mystery drama film written and directed by Paul Auster and starring David Thewlis, Irène Jacob, and Michael Imperioli. The film is about an author who having just completed his fourth novel travels to his friends' vacant country house to spend a few weeks alone. There he meets a beautiful and mysterious woman who inspires him to write a new story. Filmed in Azenhas do Mar in Sintra, Portugal in the spring of 2006, The Inner Life of Martin Frost is Auster's second film as director and fourth as writer. The film premiered at the New Directors/New Films Festival on March 21, 2007, and was released in the United States on September 7, 2007.

== Background ==
The Inner Life of Martin Frost originated as a fictional movie which is described in Auster's novel The Book of Illusions. It’s the only film that David Zimmer —the protagonist of the latter novel— watches of Hector Mann's later “hidden films” that were never screened for the public. It’s the story of a man meeting a girl and of what follows when an intense relationship develops in the midst of supernatural elements.

== Plot ==
After completing his fourth novel, successful author Martin Frost (David Thewlis) travels to the vacant country house of his friends Jack and Diane to spend some time alone and "live the life of a stone." Secluded amidst a grove of trees, the quiet cottage filled with wall-lined bookshelves offers Martin the solitude he longs for. After spending time in the surrounding countryside, Martin feels driven to write a new story. Using his friends' old typewriter, he begins the writing process and pledges to himself that he will not leave the cottage until the story is complete.

Martin's writing routine is shaken, however, when he wakes up the next morning and discovers a beautiful woman lying beside him in bed. At first, both are shocked by the other's appearance in the house, but the woman introduces herself as Claire Martin (Irène Jacob) the niece of the owners, and reveals that she's read all of his books and stories. They agree to stay in the house together, but he insists that he wants to be left alone. Over the coming days, he becomes fascinated by this mysterious woman and engages in intimate discussions about philosophy and creativity with her. Eventually he falls in love with Claire, and the two make love.

Thrilled with his new-found romantic relationship, Martin proceeds with writing his new story. As the story nears completion, however, Claire suddenly collapses on the lawn and falls seriously ill. Despite Martin's efforts to care for her, she falls deeper into a feverish state. After completing his new story, he discovers Claire has died. Suddenly realizing the mysterious connection between Claire and the story, Martin quickly throws the type-written pages into the fire, thereby reviving Claire. While the couple celebrate their love for each, Claire is troubled by his act of burning his story.

On their way to the airport to go to Martin's home in New York City, they get a flat tire. Martin walks off to find a service station for assistance, leaving Claire behind with the car. While he's away, she runs off into the woods and disappears. Soon after, the broken-hearted Martin meets a local plumber, Jim Fortunato (Michael Imperioli), who also happens to be a writer of short stories. Jim talks Martin into reading three of his works to get his advice. Sometime later, Jim shows up at the cottage with his orphan niece Anna James (Sophie Auster) and offers her housecleaning services in return for his reading the stories. The shy girl turns out to be a talented singer and actress, and Martin agrees to let her stay with him.

At the cottage, Anna meets Claire hiding in the bedroom and offers her help. Later, Anna directs Martin to put on a blindfold. After the blindfold is secure, Claire emerges and embraces the surprised and grateful Martin. Claire warns him that he cannot look at her or else she will disappear. The next day, as Martin and Anna prepare to drive to the airport, Claire enters the car and sits in the back seat, assuring Martin that he is allowed to look at her in mirrors. The two look at each other lovingly in the rearview mirror, and the three drive off together.

== Cast ==
- David Thewlis as Martin Frost
- Irène Jacob as Claire Martin
- Michael Imperioli as Jim Fortunato
- Sophie Auster as Anna James
- Paul Auster as Narrator (uncredited)

== Production ==
Principal photography took place from May 6 to June 6, 2006 in Azenhas do Mar in Sintra, Portugal. Studio scenes were filmed at Estúdios Nova Imagem studios in Portugal.

== Critical response ==
On review aggregator website Rotten Tomatoes, the film holds an approval rating of 10% based on 10 reviews. In his review in The New York Times, film critic Matt Zoller Seitz found the movie's style to be "aggressively literary, with plummy third-person narration ... that over-interrogates every development, and close-ups of significant objects ... that aim for talismanic power but don't get there". Seitz concludes that the film "plays like a half-baked tribute to Wings of Desire. In her review for the New York Daily News, Elizabeth Weitzman gave the film one and a half out of four stars, calling it a "suffocating romance" that made her feel as if she were "helplessly stuck inside the head of the most pretentious person you know".

Not all reviews were negative. In his review for PopMatters, culture critic Stuart Henderson gave the film nine out of ten stars, calling it a "tiny, Bergmanesque chamber movie" that announces "the emergence of a fully-fledged filmmaker". Henderson notes that the story being written by the character Martin Frost is not merely a story, but in fact is the character of Claire Martin, and she is the story.
