= Bioscop =

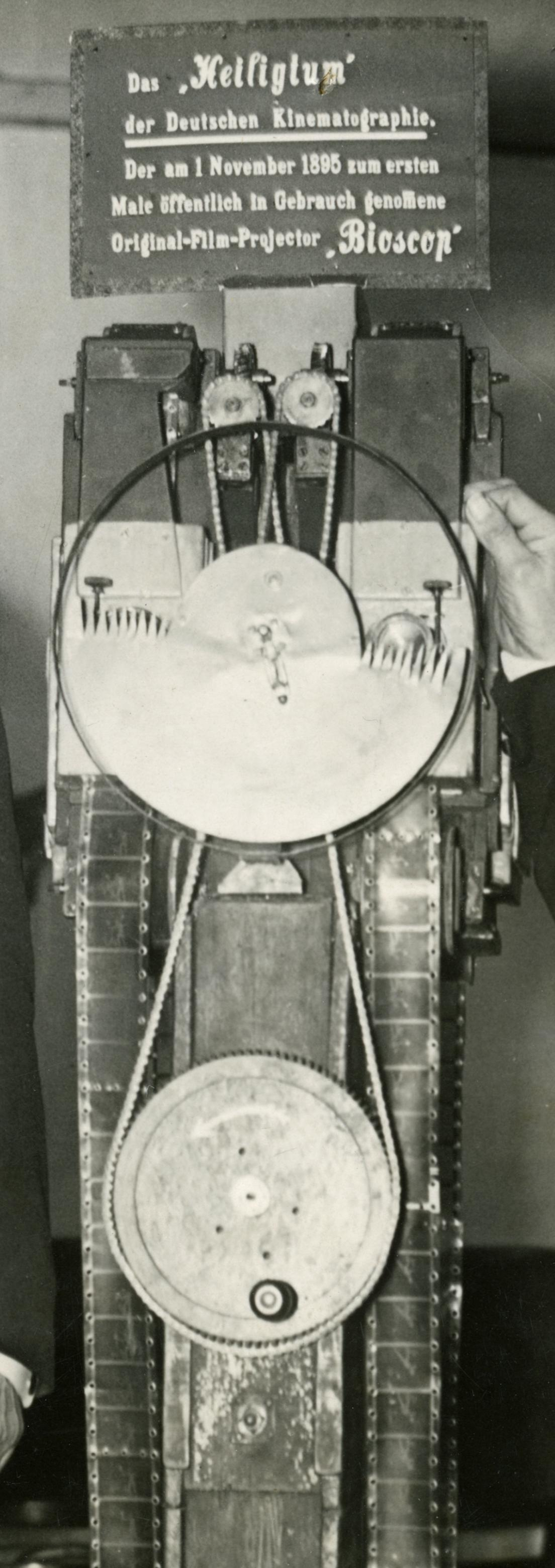
Bioskop

The Bioscop is a movie projector developed in 1895 by German inventors and filmmakers Max Skladanowsky and his brother Emil Skladanowsky (1866–1945).

== History ==
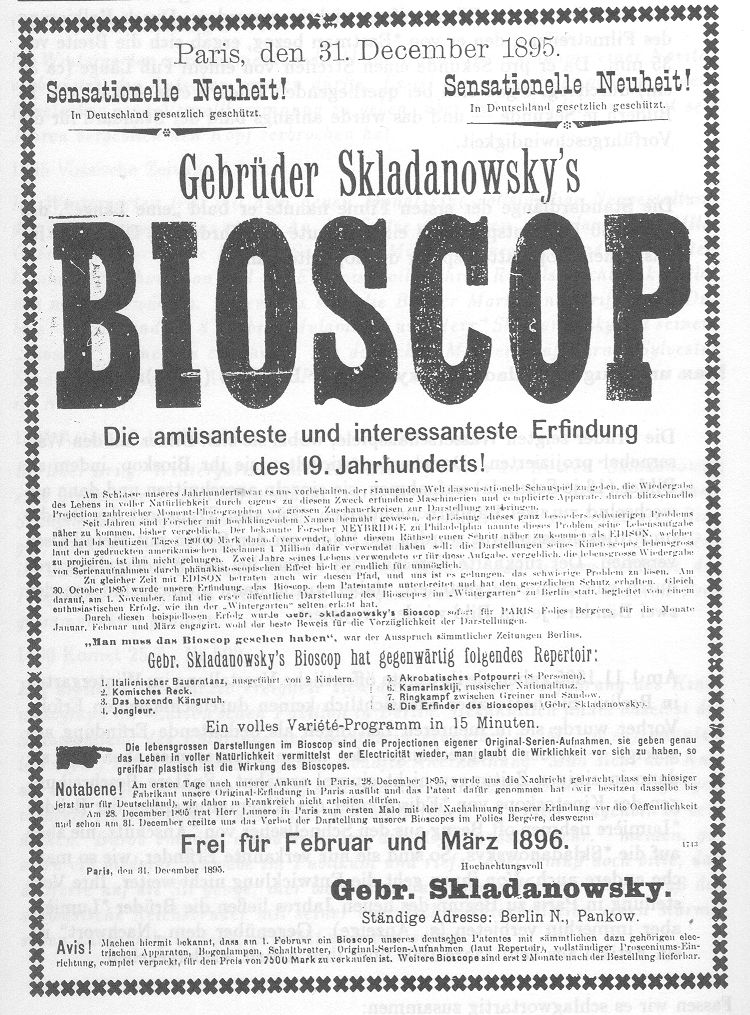
1895 poster for Bioscop screenings and equipment, mentioning that the Skladanowsky's didn't dare to work in France after finding out that the Lumi1er brothers had a patent for a similar system, therefore cancelled the planned screenings at the Folies Bergère and now were available for February and March

The Bioscop used two loops of 54-mm films without a side perforation along with it. This caused poor control of the film-transport in comparison to other system and it might therefore have been unable to compete with the cinematograph by the Lumière brothers, introduced in Paris on 28 December 1895.

Ringkämpfer (1895)

The first public performance of the movie scenes using the Bioscop was organized in the restaurant Feldschlößchen in Berlin-Pankow, Berliner Straße 27. Three of the scenes became iconic for early cinematography: Boxing Kangaroo, The Wrestler and The Serpentine Dancer. They were all shot earlier in the garden of the same restaurant.

The ballroom of the Felschlößchen restaurant was later converted into the first permanent cinema in Germany and served the audience under the name Tivoli until it was closed in 1994 and demolished to make space for a discount supermarket.

The Skladanovsky brothers later used the Bioscop to show movies to a larger audience in the Berlin Variete theater "Wintergarten". This can be considered the first movie program to a paid audience. In 1896, they traveled through the Netherlands and Scandinavia, presenting their invention to the international audience.

When the Nazis came to power in 1933, they investigated the family background of Max Skladanowsky to determine if they were Polish Jews. Because Skladanowsky was of non-Jewish origins, he was elevated by the Nazis as a great German cinema innovator. On May 4 1933, an event at Berlin's Atrium cinema honoring Skladanowsky's contributions to German cinema was attended by Joseph Goebbels and in 1935 Adolf Hitler attended a private screening of a Skladanowsky film. Skladanowsky was fully supportive of the Nazis, adding "Heil Hitler!" to many of his letters and describing the Bioskop as a non-Jewish and therefore authentically German invention. Skladanowsky's support for the Nazi embrace of his work came during a time of poverty and may have been motivated by profit. The Nazis had some ambivalence about his work due to his Polish ancestry and because he had fabricated some of his chronology to exaggerate his influence and by the time of his death in 1939 the Nazis interest in his work had declined.

In the Netherlands and the Balkans the word "bioscop"/"bioscoop" means cinema. The term "Bioscope" had already been used by Jules Duboscq for his stereophotographic fantascope (produced around 1852/1853), but the device had not gained as much attention as the Skladanowsky film system.
