= Laurent Petitgand =

French composer, songwriter, singer and actor

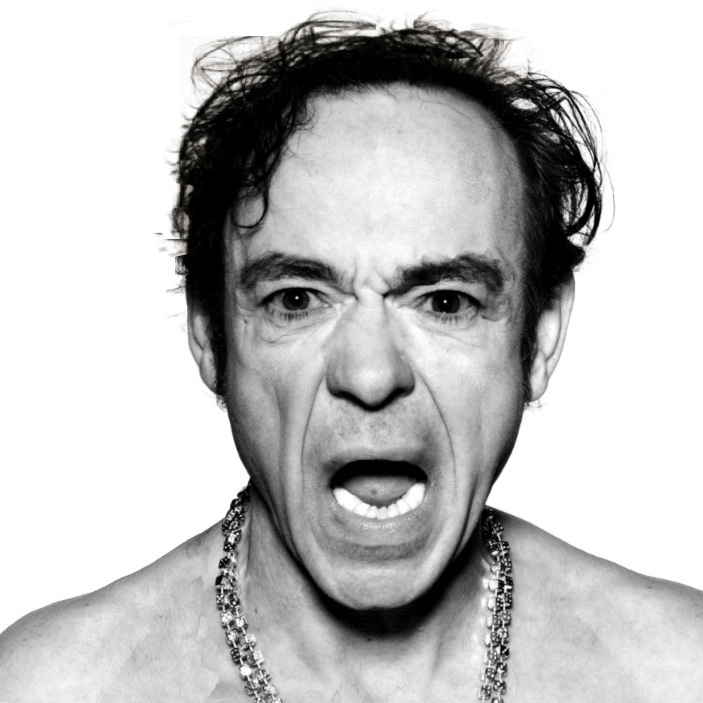
- Laurent Petitgand Le Cri
- Born: 28 September 1959 (age 66); Laxou, France
- Occupations: Composer, songwriter, singer and actor

Laurent Petitgand (born 28 September 1959 in Laxou, France) is a French composer, songwriter, singer and actor. He is best known for The Salt of the Earth, The Inner Life of Martin Frost (2007), A Trick of Light (1996), Beyond the Clouds, Faraway, So Close! (1992), Notebook on Cities and Clothes (1989), Wings of Desire Zirkus Music (1987), Tokyo-Ga (1985).

== Discography ==
=== Albums ===
- Je veux voir la Mer (1982) (CD, Album) with Dick Tracy Les Disques Du Soleil Et De L'Acier
- Slim Bretzel (1983) (Maxi 45t) with Dick Tracy Les Disques Du Soleil Et De L'Acier
- Tokyo-Ga (1985) (LP, BO) with Dick Tracy Les Disques Du Soleil Et De L'Acier
- Wings of Desire (Der Himmel über Berlin) (CD, LP, Album) (1987) – with Jürgen Knieper – Nick Cave – Laurie Anderson, etc.
- Liqueurs de chair (CD, Album) (1988) Loory Petitgang, music for the ballet of Angelin Preljocaj
- L' Or and Kat (LP, Ltd) (1989) Laurie Petigand + GN
- Fishes (LP, Ltd) (1989) Laurie Petigand + GN
- Lisa (LP, Ltd) (1988) Laurie Petigand + GN
- Du sang sur le cou du chat (1989) Rainer Werner Fassbinder
- Amer America (CD, Album) (1990) music for the ballet of Angelin Preljocaj
- Les Grands Voyageurs (1991) Loory Petitgand + Alain Bashung – Osez Joséphine – Barclay
  - (Cass, Album) (1991)
  - (CD, Album) (1991)
  - (LP, Album) (1991)
  - (CD, Album, RP) (1992)
  - (CD, Album, RE, Dig) (1997)
  - (LP, Album, RE) (2009)
- Faraway, So Close! (1993) (CD, Album) Electrola
- La Tournée Des Grands Espaces (2004) Loory Petitgand + Alain Bashung – Barclay
  - (2xDVD-V, PAL) (2004)
  - (2xCD, Album) (2004)
  - (2xCD, Album, Dig) (2004)
  - (2xCD) (2004)
- Comme si la terre penchait (2005) Christophe (singer)
- The Inner Life of Martin Frost (2007) Paul Auster / Sophie Auster
- Gamines (2009) – with Toto Cutugno, "Aline" by Christophe
- Si J'avais Su, J'aurais Rien Dit (2012) (LP, Album + CD, Album) L. Petitgand + GN chez Ici, d'ailleurs... (Triple LP, Album) Wenders Music
- Je Vous Dis (2014) (LP, Album + CD, Album) L. Petitgand + GN Ici, d'ailleurs...
- Oublier (2015) (LP, Album + CD, Album) L. Petitgand + GN Ici, d'ailleurs...
- Silver Lining – Driven by Music (2015) (Triple LP, Album) Wenders Music

=== Soundtracks ===
- Tokyo-Ga (LP, Album) (1985) with Dick Tracy Les Disques Du Soleil Et De L'Acier
- Wings of Desire (Der Himmel über Berlin) (CD, LP, Album) (1987) – with Jürgen Knieper – Nick Cave – Laurie Anderson, etc.
- Notebook on Cities and Clothes (CD, Album) (1992)
- Faraway, So Close! (1993) (CD, Album) avec Lou Reed – U2 – Nick Cave etc. ...
- The Inner Life of Martin Frost (CD, Album) (2007) Naïve Records
- Gamines (online) (2009)
- The Salt of the Earth (CD, Album) (2015) Idol
- Pope Francis - A Man of His Word (2018)
