= Pope Francis: A Man of His Word =

2018 documentary film by Wim Wenders

- Theatrical release poster
- Directed by: Wim Wenders
- Screenplay by: Wim Wenders; David Rosier
- Produced by: Samanta Gandolfi Branca; Alessandro Lo Monaco; Andrea Gambetta; Wim Wenders; David Rosier
- Starring: Pope Francis
- Cinematography: Lisa Rinzler
- Edited by: Maxine Goedicke
- Music by: Laurent Petitgand
- Production companies: The Palindrome; Centro Televisivo Vaticano; Célestes Images; Solares Fondazione delle arti; Neue Road Movies; Decia Films; Fondazione Solares Suisse; PTS Art's Factory
- Distributed by: Focus Features; Universal Pictures
- Release dates: 13 May 2018 (Cannes); 18 May 2018 (United States); 14 June 2018 (Germany); 12 September 2018 (France)
- Running time: 96 minutes
- Countries: France; Germany; Italy; Switzerland
- Language: English
- Box office: $8.6 million

Pope Francis: A Man of His Word is a 2018 documentary film produced, co-written and directed by Wim Wenders, focusing on the life and goals of Pope Francis, the 266th Pope and sovereign of the Vatican City State. A Swiss-Italian-French-German co-production, the film premiered at the 2018 Cannes Film Festival and was released in the United States on 18 May 2018.

== Premise ==
Following Pope Francis as he tries to spread words of peace in the modern era.

During the film, Pope Francis discusses various topics as he looks directly into the camera and seems to be talking directly to the viewer. Interviewer (Wenders) is not in the frame due to the chosen genre of the interview - "alone with the world". Francis' direct speech is alternated with various documentary shots about his life (visits to prisons and hospitals, speeches, etc.).

== Cast ==
- Pope Francis
- Ignazio Oliva as Francis of Assisi
- Daniele De Angelis as Friar
- Carlo Falconetti as Friar
- María Eufemia Goycoechea
- Ilze Scamparini
- Wim Wenders

=== Non-speaking appearances ===
- Mahmoud Abbas
- Joe Biden
- John Boehner
- Susan Collins
- Recep Tayyip Erdogan
- Stephen Hawking
- Steny Hoyer
- Muhammad Ahmad Hussein, Grand Mufti of Jerusalem
- Tim Kaine
- John Kerry
- John Lewis
- Kevin McCarthy
- Mitch McConnell
- Mark Milley
- Evo Morales
- Bob Menendez
- Angela Merkel
- Prince Ghazi bin Muhammad, Jordan
- Barack Obama
- Shimon Peres
- Nancy Pelosi
- Samantha Power
- Vladimir Putin
- Marco Rubio
- Paul Ryan
- Steve Scalise
- Chuck Schumer
- Donald Trump
- Melania Trump

== Production ==
Wenders said the project originated when the Vatican sent him a letter in 2014 asking him to lead a project about Pope Francis. While Wenders shot the interview sessions with Francis, as well as the re-enactments and everything around the city of Assisi, much of the rest of the film was stock footage from TV stations and the Vatican archives; he received final cut privilege on the project.

== Reception ==
=== Box office ===
Pope Francis: A Man of His Word grossed $2 million in the United States and Canada, and $6.5 million in other territories, for a total worldwide gross of $8.5 million.

The film began its limited release on 18 May 2018, and over its opening weekend grossed $507,870 from 346 theaters, finishing 16th at the box office.

The film was released in the UK on 10 August 2018.

=== Critical response ===
On review aggregator Rotten Tomatoes, the film holds an approval rating of 82% based on 77 reviews, and an average rating of 6.8/10. The website's critical consensus reads: "Pope Francis - A Man of His Word offers a compelling look at the pontiff's ideas and message, even if its distance from the man means it won't win many new converts." On Metacritic, the film has a weighted average score of 63 out of 100, based on 24 critics, indicating "generally favorable reviews". Audiences polled by PostTrak gave the film a 92% overall positive score, with 82% saying they would definitely recommend it.

Nick Allen of RogerEbert.com wrote that the film is like "a non-denominational sermon, under the cinematic care of an artist first, Pope Francis fanboy second." Comparing it to previous documentaries about global warming, he also wrote that it is "a food-for-thought doc that wholly justifies its existence."
