= A Trick of Light =

A Trick of the Light
- German DVD cover
- Directed by: Wim Wenders
- Written by: Sebastian Andrae; Henrick Heckmann; Veit Helmer; German Kral; Barbara Rohm; Alina Teodorescu; Wim Wenders
- Produced by: Veit Helmer; Wolfgang Längsfeld; Wim Wenders
- Starring: Udo Kier; Nadine Büttner; Christoph Merg; Otto Kuhnle; Lucie Hürtgent-Skladanowsky
- Cinematography: Jürgen Jürges
- Edited by: Peter Przygodda
- Music by: Laurent Petitgand
- Release date: 1995
- Running time: 79 minutes
- Country: Germany
- Language: German

A Trick of the Light (German: Die Gebrüder Skladanowsky "The Skladanowsky brothers") is a 1995 German biographical film directed by Wim Wenders. The film was made with the students of the University of Television and Film Munich and is a combination of docudrama, fictional reenactment, and experimental photography to show the birth of cinema in Berlin where Max Skladanowsky and his brother Emil built a projector they called the Bioscop.

== Plot ==
=== Part One ===
Little Gertrud lives with her father Max Skladanowky and her uncles Emil and Eugen in Pankow near Berlin. Her everyday life is shaped by the inventive spirit of her father and uncles. She has a very close relationship with all of them, but especially Eugen, who works as a clown and magician. Her father has been working for a long time on the invention of a device that can play back moving images. So far, together with Emil, he earns his living mainly by demonstrating dissolving views or magic lanterns at fairs. Gertrud finds this form of entertainment boring and inauthentic and wants to push ahead the development. To Gertrud's disappointment her uncle Eugen has to go away because he has taken a job with the circus. Before he leaves, they make a short film showing Eugen on the roof of the house. When Gertrud takes a peek in the box, she accidentally exposes the first set of film strips. Luckily, the second set was kept safe. Max then solves the problem of transporting the film and can proudly present his life size projection of his brother for Gertrud. Others are also secretly interested in Skladanowsky's invention, but the family is able to scare the spy away several times.

=== Part Two ===
On December 28, 1895, Max Skladanowsky is sitting with his brother Emil in the Grand Café on the Boulevard des Capucines in Paris and witnesses the Lumière brothers' demonstration. It is clear to him that his own apparatus is hopelessly inferior to the invention of the French. He remembers the preparations for his own demonstration: Word of the groundbreaking invention has already gotten around in Berlin, and so many artists gather to let the Skladanowskys capture them on film strips in a beer garden. The management of the well-known Wintergarten vaudeville company on Friedrichstraße got wind of it and want to offer the brothers a business deal. The spy, watching from a distance, tries to find out as much as possible. Emil overhears the spy offering the vaudeville owners his own design. He is relieved when the spy's bicycle-powered contraption explodes during a demonstration for the vaudeville directors. When posting advertisements for the Winder Garden show, the Skladanowskys discover that a famous artiste is in town and performing her famous serpentine dance. They manage to get the lady to perform in front of their camera but during a nightly date with a crush of his Emil accidentally holds a burning candle too close to the hanging film strips and one catches fire, destroying the footage of the serpentine dance performance. Emil then decides to reshoot the scene with his crush Josephine performing the dance. When the final film is screened, neither Max nor the audience notice the mistake. Only the original performer, who is watching, begins to question what she is seeing. This is quickly forgotten when she receives the applause from the crowd. The screening is a complete success.

=== Part Three ===
In the present, Lucie Hürtgen-Skladanowsky, born in 1904 as the younger daughter of Max Skladanowsky, tells of her memories of her father, her uncles, her sister and the pioneering days of cinema. Suddenly Eugen and Gertrud reappear and look around the room. The scene, immersed in color, returns to black and white. When Eugen and his little niece see the well-known spy at the window, they scare him away. A modern cab is waiting for the two, but Eugen conjures up a more "contemporary" carriage in which they drive away. They then disappear at a construction site of Potsdamer Platz.

== Background ==
The brothers Max and Emil Skladanowsky showed their films at the Wintergarten Variété in Berlin on November 1, 1895. They were thus eight weeks earlier than the Lumière brothers, who presented their work in Paris on December 28, 1895. In contrast, the Skladanowskys' strips consisted of Variété numbers shot in front of light or dark curtains, such as a boxing kangaroo or a serpentine dance. The apparatus from Berlin called the Bioscop was ultimately inferior to the Lumières' invention because they could both record and play back with their Cinematography and were able to produce longer films.

In 1995, to mark the 100th anniversary of cinema, Wim Wenders and students from the HFF Munich made this film about the birth of the medium. They decided against producing a documentary and in favor of a tongue-in-cheek narrative style that interpreted history rather liberally, because they wanted to honor the naive and unorthodox way in which the Skladanowsky brothers approached their invention. They also wanted to emphasize their status as rather penniless hobbyists with no precision engineering training and no industrial sponsor.

The film was created as a silent film and was then provided with off screen narrators. The 1895 scenes were shot on a historical hand crank camera from the company Askania, while the present-day shots were filmed with present-day cameras such as the Arri.

Parts of it had been previously shown at various film festivals. The television station "arte" showed the complete film for the first time on December 28, 1995. The broadcast was preceded by an introduction by Wim Wenders as well as a complete showing of the historical variety films screened at the winter garden at the time.

== Cast ==
- Udo Kier: Max Skladanowsky
- Otto Kuhnle: Emil Skladanowsky
- Nadine Büttner: Gertrud Skladanowsky
- Christoph Merg: Eugen Skladanowsky
- Rüdiger Vogler: Hochradfahrer
- Wim Wenders: Milchmann
- Lucie Hürtgen-Skladanowsky
- Rolf Zacher: Young Max Skladanowsky
- Thomas Rosié
- Bodo Lang
- Hans Moser
- Alfred Szczot
- Italian Peasant Dance: Children's Group Ploetz-Larella
- Funny Bar: Brüder Milton
- Boxing Kangaroo: Mister Delaware
- Juggler: Paul Petras
- Acrobat: Familie Grunato
- Kamarinskaja (Russian National Dance): Gebrüder Tscherpanoff
- Serpentine Dancer: Mademoiselle Ancion
- Apotheose: Gebrüder Skladanowsky

Lucie Hürtgen-Skladanowsky (July 6, 1904, in Berlin – May 15, 2001, in Berlin), the last contemporary witness of a family that made film history, has a say in the film.

== Production ==
A Trick of Light was jointly directed by Wim Wenders and the students of the Munich Film Academy. "Though in rigid technical terms, Wenders' film ought to be labelled a 'documentary', it reads equally well as a fiction film because there are dramatized events in the recreation of history of the lives of the three brothers who are no longer alive." There are documentary segments as well where Lucie, Max’s youngest daughter, then in her early nineties, is interviewed and answers questions quite candidly about her recollections.

Evolving technology of cinema that sweeps through silent cinema into sound and music and dialogue within this film. It shifts from black-and-white to colour, from interior shots to location shooting. From the old jittery technique of the movie camera, the cut up film negative that is joined again to turn into a continuous flow of images but still using some of the original film. Emotional flourishes ranging from shock, suspense, disappointment, depression, fulfilment, joy, and triumph from tragedy. The production also used the black and white film within the colored interview portions with Lucie.

== Release ==
=== Awards and accolades ===
The film was nominated and the winner of the Friedrich-Wilhelm-Murano-Award at the "Day of the German Short Film" in 1996. The film was also shown at two international film festivals, the Berlin International Film Festival and the International Film Festival Rotterdam, both in 1997.

=== Critical reception and reviews ===
Overall the reception of the film was positive as it combined the old film as well as new film. Its release was successful and received a lot of positive reviews on the historical and educational purposes of its making. It was technologically challenging to make but reviews had high praise for its production process and its ultimate product.

== Web Links ==
- Die Gebrüder Skladanowsky in the Internet Movie Database (English)
- Die Gebrüder Skladanowsky by filmportal.de
- Die Gebrüder Skladanowsky by wimwendersstiftung.de
- Ulrike Holdt: Das boxende Känguruh.
