= Tokyo-Ga =

1985 film by Wim Wenders

- Japanese theatrical release poster
- Directed by: Wim Wenders
- Written by: Wim Wenders
- Produced by: Chris Sievernich; Wim Wenders
- Starring: Chishū Ryū; Yuharu Atsuta; Werner Herzog
- Narrated by: Wim Wenders
- Cinematography: Edward Lachman
- Edited by: Solveig Dommartin; Jon Neuburger; Wim Wenders
- Music by: Laurent Petitgand
- Release date: 1985
- Running time: 92 minutes
- Countries: United States; West Germany
- Languages: French; English; Japanese; German

Tokyo-Ga is a 1985 documentary film directed by Wim Wenders, about Japanese filmmaker Yasujirō Ozu. An international co-production of the United States and West Germany, the film was shot in spring 1983. Its focus ranges from explicit explorations of Ozu's filmmaking—Wenders interviews Ozu's regular cinematographer, Yuharu Atsuta, and one of Ozu's favorite actors, Chishū Ryū—to scenes of contemporary Tokyo, featuring pachinko machines and plastic food displays. Wenders introduces the film as a "diary on film."

Tokyo-Ga was screened in the Un Certain Regard section at the 1985 Cannes Film Festival.

== Sections ==
1. Reflections on Ozu
2. Tokyo
3. The center of the world
4. Chishū Ryū
5. Mu
6. Amusements
7. Wax food
8. Searching for images
9. Trains
10. Yuharu Atsuta
11. A good-bye
