= El Salvador: Another Vietnam =

1981 film

- Directed by: Glenn Silber; Tetê Vasconcellos
- Written by: Claudia Vianello
- Produced by: Glenn Silber; Tetê Vasconcellos; Claudia Vianello
- Narrated by: Mike Farrell
- Cinematography: Newton Thomas Sigel
- Edited by: Deborah Shaffer; Kate Taverna
- Distributed by: Icarus Films; WNET
- Release date: 1981
- Running time: 53 minutes
- Country: United States
- Language: English

El Salvador: Another Vietnam is a 1981 American documentary film directed by Glenn Silber.

== Synopsis ==
This political documentary illustrates the turbulent history of El Salvador from the 1920s-1970s, and the role of the U.S. government in that history. As the title suggests, the presence of U.S. military advisors in a country fighting against socialist guerrilla factions is highly reminiscent of the beginnings of the U.S. escalation of the war in Vietnam.

== Accolades ==
It was nominated for the Academy Award for Best Documentary Feature.
