= The Salt of the Earth (2014 film) =

2014 film

- Film poster
- Directed by: Wim Wenders; Juliano Ribeiro Salgado
- Written by: Juliano Ribeiro Salgado; Wim Wenders; David Rosier
- Produced by: David Rosier
- Starring: Sebastião Salgado
- Cinematography: Hugo Barbier; Juliano Ribeiro Salgado
- Edited by: Maxine Goedicke; Rob Myers
- Music by: Laurent Petitgand
- Production companies: Decia Films; Amazonas Images; Fondazione Solares delle Arti
- Distributed by: Le Pacte
- Release dates: 20 May 2014 (Cannes); 15 October 2014 (France); 26 March 2015 (Brazil)
- Running time: 110 minutes
- Countries: France; Brazil; Italy
- Languages: French; Portuguese; Italian; English
- Box office: $3.6 million

The Salt of the Earth (also released under the French title Le sel de la terre) is a 2014 internationally co-produced biographical documentary film directed by Wim Wenders and Juliano Ribeiro Salgado. It portrays the works of Salgado's father, the Brazilian photographer Sebastião Salgado.

The film was selected to compete in the Un Certain Regard section of the 2014 Cannes Film Festival, where it won the Special Prize. It went on to win many awards at international film festivals and awards ceremonies, including the Audience Award at the 2014 San Sebastián International Film Festival, the Audience Award at the 2015 Tromsø International Film Festival, and Best Documentary at the 40th César Awards. At the 87th Academy Awards, The Salt of the Earth was nominated for Best Documentary.

== Overview ==
Numerous examples of Sebastião Salgado's photographs, which explore natural environments and the humans who inhabit them, are featured in the film, with Salgado providing commentary on the circumstances surrounding their creation. His black and white photographs illuminate how the environment and humans are exploited to maximize profit for the global economic market. The film traces 40 years of Salgado's work, which took him from South America to Africa, Europe, the Arctic, and back home to Brazil, and focuses on international conflicts, starvation and exodus, and natural landscapes, both pristine and in decline. Also featured in the film are some reminiscences from Salgado's son, Juliano Ribeiro Salgado (co-director of the film), about his childhood with a father who was absent much of the time, and the trips he took with his father as an adult to discover who Sebastião was beyond his childhood conception.

== Synopsis ==
After leaving Brazil for political reasons in the late 1960s, Sebastião Salgado began a career in France as an economist. When his wife, Lélia, bought a camera, however, he discovered a love of photography, and changed professions. With Lelia's support, he began working full-time as a photographer in 1973, initially doing photojournalism before transitioning to a more documentary-style. Salgado's own photos and videos are used to illustrate his life and work, beginning with his exile from Brazil and subsequent transition from economist to artist and explorer.

Feeling homesick, but not yet able to return to Brazil, for his first major multi-year project Sebastião traveled around other parts of the Americas, where he spent time among and photographed the people and their circumstances.

Next, Sebastião traveled to the Sahel region of Africa, taking many unflinching and heartbreaking photographs of the difficult conditions he encountered. He documented the famine in Ethiopia (which he refers to as a problem of distribution, not just a natural disaster), spending time at the largest ever refugee camps and witnessing some of the innumerable deaths that occurred there from hunger, cholera, and cold. His work helped bring worldwide attention to the region and the underlying causes of the suffering.

After a project to photograph the workers of the world, Sebastião undertook a project to document refugees, including those resulting from the Yugoslav Wars and the Rwandan genocide. When he returned to follow up on the refugees from Rwanda one year later, Sebastião became so dispirited by what he found that he lost hope for humanity and questioned the point of his work.

Sebastião and Lélia moved from Paris to Sebastião's native Minas Gerais to help run his ailing father's ranch. Lélia had the idea to reforest the land, and they founded the Instituto Terra. Inspired by the revitalization of his family land, Sebastião decided to do another big photographic project, this time to document pristine landscapes and wildlife, as well as human communities that continue to live in accordance with their ancestral traditions, such as the Zo'é, who did not come into contact with the modern world until the late-1980s, and the Yali.

== Reception ==
The Salt of the Earth received largely positive reviews from critics. On review aggregator website Rotten Tomatoes, it has an approval rating of 95% based on 96 reviews, with an average rating of 8.00/10; the site's "critics consensus" reads: "While the work it honors may pose thorny ethical questions that Salt of the Earth neglects to answer, it remains a shattering, thought-provoking testament to Sebastião Salgado's career." On Metacritic, the film has a weighted average score of 83 out of 100 based on reviews by 29 critics, indicating "universal acclaim".
