= Max Skladanowsky =

German inventor and early filmmaker

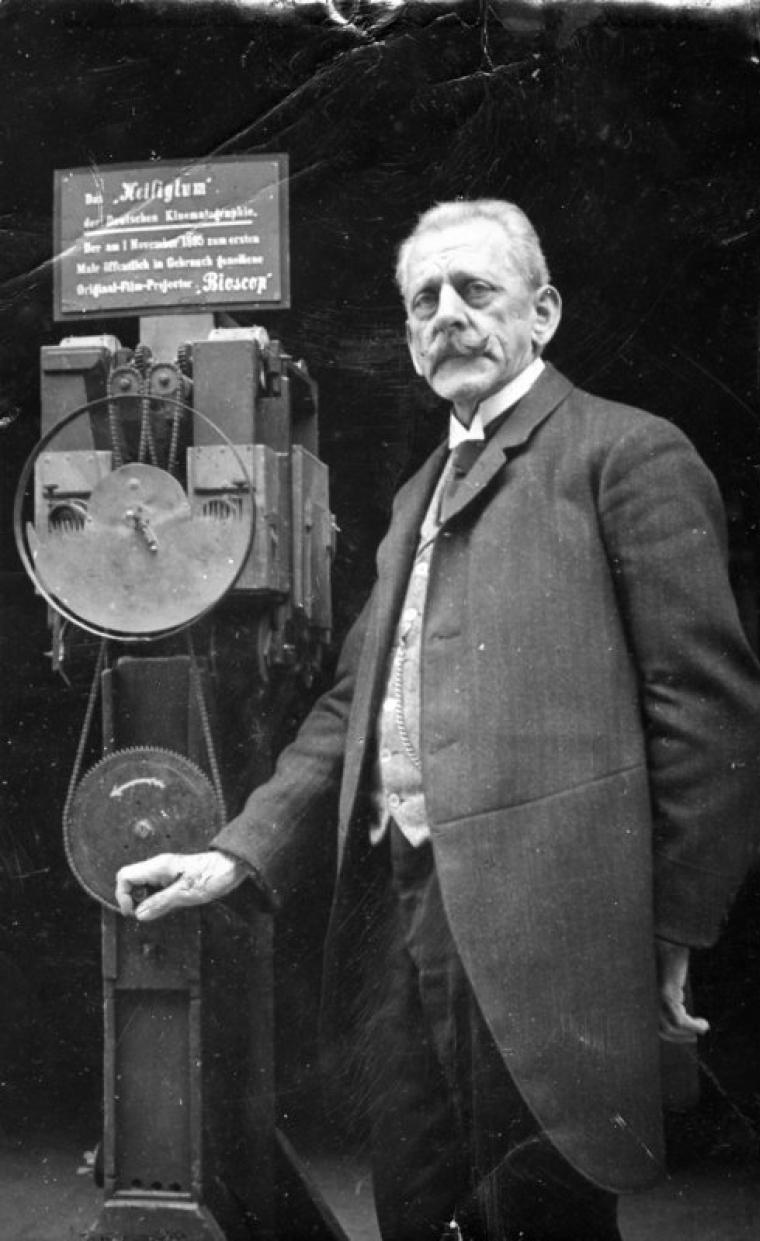
Max Skladanowsky with the Bioscop in 1936

Max Skladanowsky (30 April 1863 – 30 November 1939) was a German inventor and early filmmaker. Along with his brother Emil, he invented the Bioscop, an early movie projector the Skladanowsky brothers used to display a moving picture show to a paying audience on 1 November 1895, shortly before the public debut of the Lumière Brothers' Cinématographe in Paris on 28 December 1895.

== Career ==
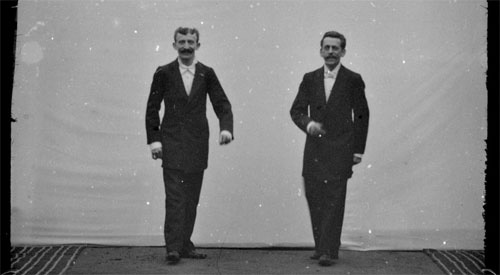
Max and Emil Skladanowsky in front of a projection screen

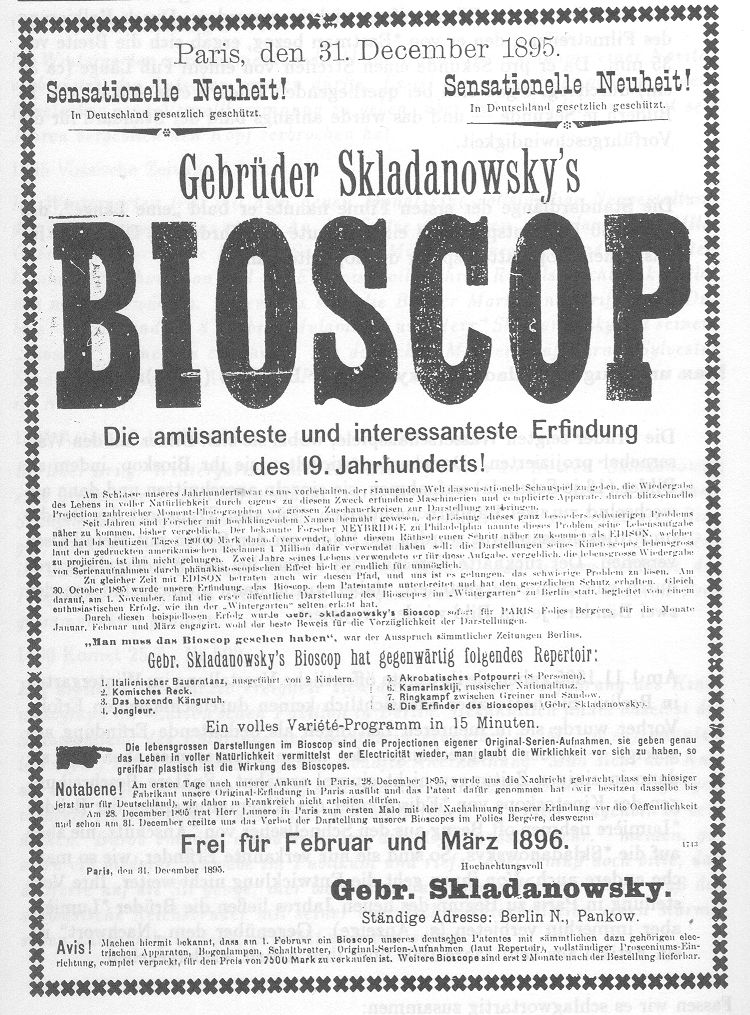
1895 poster for Bioscop screenings

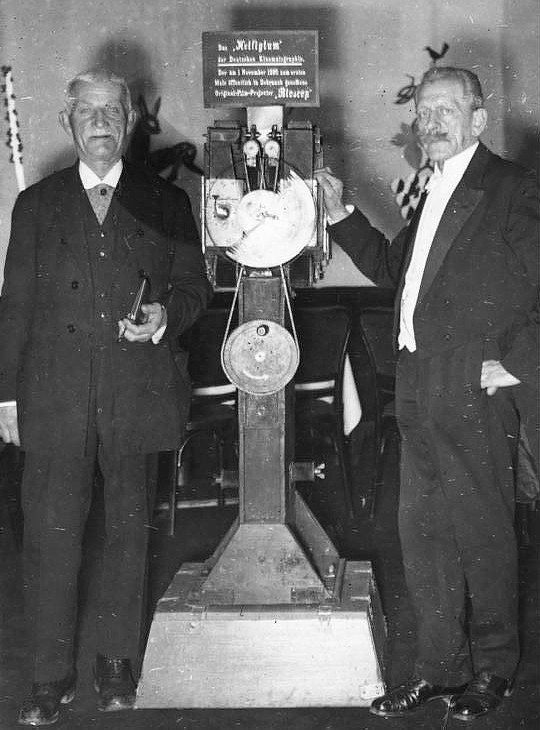
Max Skladanowsky (right) in 1934 with his brother Eugen and the Bioscop

Skladanowsky was of Polish descent, and his family relocated to Berlin in the early 19th century. Born as the fourth child of glazier Carl Theodor Skladanowsky (1830–1897) and Luise Auguste Ernestine Skladanowsky, Max Skladanowsky was apprenticed as a photographer and glass painter, which led to an interest in magic lanterns. In 1879, he began to tour Germany and Central Europe with his father Carl and elder brother Emil, giving dissolving magic lantern shows. While Emil mostly took care of promotion, Max was more involved with the technology—for instance, he developed special multi-lens devices that allowed simultaneous projection of up to nine separate image sequences. Carl retired from this show business, but Max and Emil continued and added other attractions, including a type of naumachia that involved electro-mechanical effects and pyrotechnics.

Max would later claim to have constructed their first film camera on 20 August 1892, but this more likely happened in the summer or autumn of 1894. He also single-handedly constructed the Bioskop projector. Partially based on the dissolving view lantern, it featured two lenses and two separate film reels, one frame being projected alternately from each. It was hand-cranked to transport 44.5 mm-wide unperforated Eastman-Kodak film-stock, which was carefully cut, perforated and re-assembled by hand and coated with an emulsion developed by Max. The projector was placed behind a screen, which was made transparent by keeping it wet to show the images optimally.

The Skladanowsky brothers shot several films in May 1895. Their first film recorded Emil performing overstated movements on a rooftop with a panorama of Berlin in the background. This was an experimental test, not to be used in their commercial screenings. Their further choice of subjects seemed influenced by the films they probably viewed in the Kinetoscope that was installed in Berlin in March. They filmed various variety acts who were performing in town and had them perform in the gardens of theatres in full sunlight, against a neutral background (usually white, sometimes black).

Test screenings were held at the Gasthaus Sello in July 1895, attended by some invited friends and colleagues. The directors of the Wintergarten music hall were impressed enough after seeing a screening of the Bioskop to eventually sign the Skladanowsky brothers in September for the substantial fee of 2500 Goldmark. The Skladanowsky brothers would first stage a naumachia show at the Wintergarten, re-enacting an Alexandrian sea battle, in October. From 1 November 1895 until the end of the month they would provide a motion picture show, which was eventually screened 23 times. Their circa 15-minutes picture show was part of an evening program that lasted over three hours, which further included all kinds of variety acts, such as Mr. Thompson and his three trained elephants. In an advertisement for the program, the Bioskop appeared right at the center in an extra bold typeface with the statement "New! The most interesting invention of the modern age". The Skladanowskys showed eight films, varying in length from 99 to 174 frames (circa 6 to 11 seconds if played at 16 fps), looped repeatedly, while a specially composed score was played especially loud to drown out the noise of the machinery. The "Apotheose" film showed the brothers entering the frame from opposite sites in front of a white background, bowing towards the camera as if receiving applause and walking out of the frame again. When their show was finished they replicated the action in person in front of the projection screen. The popular venue was filled to capacity with circa 1500 rich patrons for each evening program, but not all of them watched the films. Reviews favoured the three elephants, but the Bioskop was reportedly well-received with extensive applause and flowers thrown at the screen. However, the Berlin papers were seldom critical about shows due to the revenue of the theatre advertisements they placed.

After finishing the Wintergarten run of shows, the Bioskop opened in the Hamburg Concerthaus on 21 December 1895 as a single program, without any other acts. On the 27th they traveled to Paris, engaged to play the Folies Bergère from 1 January 1896. Coincidentally, the Lumière brothers happened to present their Cinematograph in their first commercial public screening on the 28th in Paris. One of the Bergère proprietors took them to the second presentation, on the 29th, and then cancelled the booking of the Bioskop, nonetheless paying them in full. This possibly had something to do with patent rights, but the Cinematograph was clearly superior in image quality and much more easily operated than the Bioskop, and the Skladanowsky brothers may as well have preferred not to compete. A planned appearance at the London Empire Theatre was also cancelled, but they were able to further tour Köthen, Halle and Magdeburg in central Germany in March 1896; Christiania (now Oslo), Norway from 6 April to 5 May; Groningen from 14 to 24 May and Amsterdam from 21 May, the Netherlands; Copenhagen, Denmark from 11 June to 30 July; and Stockholm, Sweden from 3 August until September 1896.

Komische Begegnungen im Tiergarten zu Stockholm

Max had constructed a new camera with a Geneva drive in the autumn of 1895, and the new single-lens Bioskop-II projector in the summer of 1896. They also recorded new films (on 63mm-wide celluloid), much needed since the old ones started to get damaged, including the fiction film Komische Begegnung im Tiergarten zu Stockholm (Comical Encounter in Djurgården, Stockholm) in August 1896 with professional actors from the Victoria Theatre company. It was the first film recorded in Sweden. They returned to Berlin in February 1897, and shot several crowded urban street scenes. The new films were thought to meet the taste of new audiences and were much needed since the older films started to wear out. However, the investments proved to be in vain as a proposed return to the Wintergarten was not approved, their trade license was not renewed as the authorities believed there were already too many film exhibitors active in town, and they managed to find one venue for a second tour. Eventually, the last Bioskop show by the Skladanosky brothers took place in Stettin on 30 March 1897.

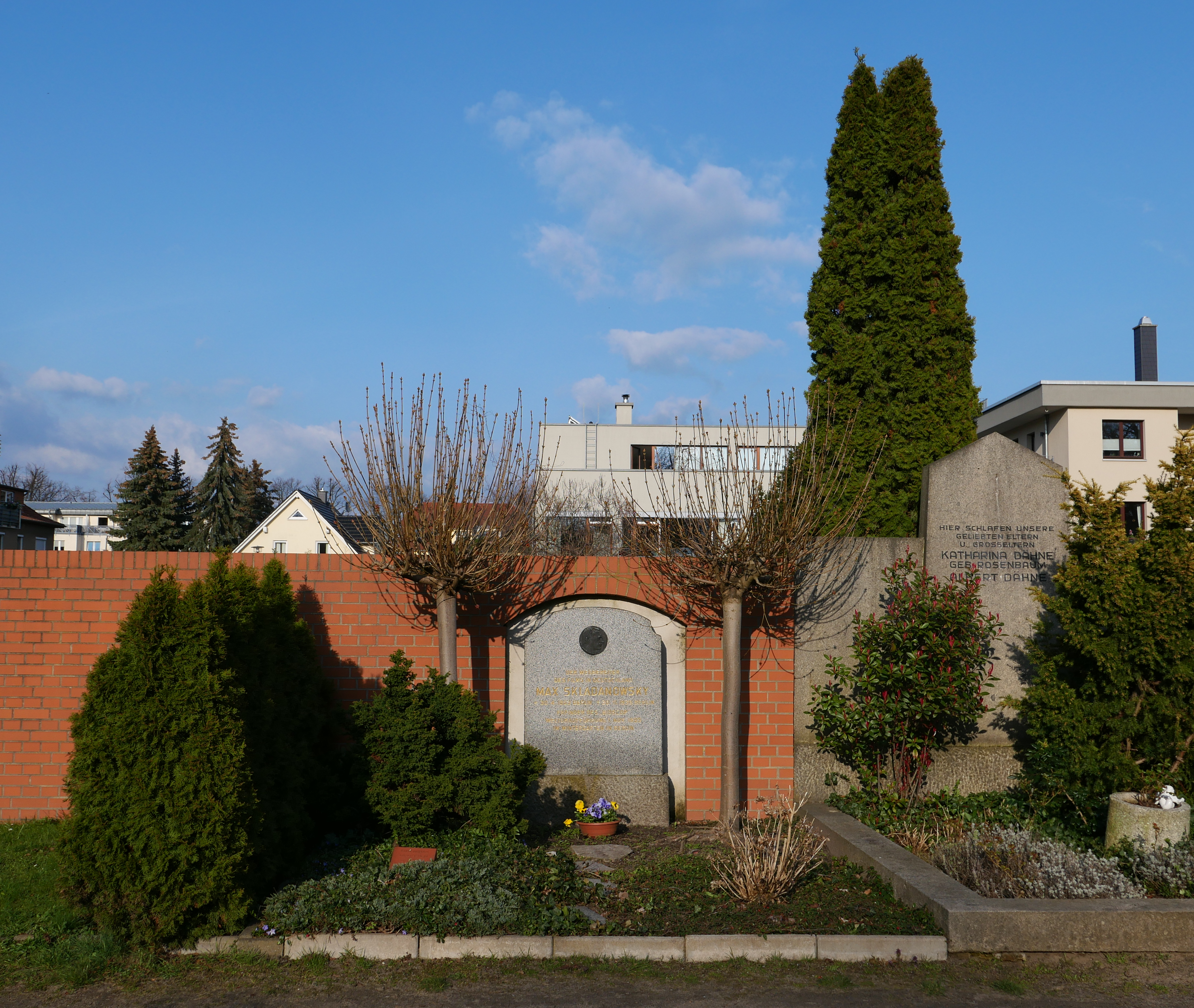
Skladanowsky's grave of honour in Berlin-Niederschönhausen.

After this, Skladanowsky returned to his former photographic activities, including the production of flip books and further magic lantern shows. He also sold amateur film cameras and projectors and produced 3-D anaglyph image slides. His company Projektion für Alle also produced a number of films in the early 20th century, some directed by Eugen, his younger brother, but with little success. In his later years, Skladanowsky was accused in the press of exaggerating his role in the early days of cinema, most notably by the pioneering cameraman Guido Seeber.

When the Nazis came to power in 1933, they investigated the Skladanowsky family's background to determine if they were Polish Jews. Because Skladanowsky was of non-Jewish origins, he was elevated by the Nazis as a great German cinema innovator. On May 4 1933, an event at Berlin's Atrium cinema honoring Skladanowsky's contributions to German cinema was attended by Joseph Goebbels. In 1935, Adolf Hitler attended a private screening of a Skladanowsky film. Skladanowsky was fully supportive of the Nazis, adding "Heil Hitler!" to many of his letters and describing the Bioskop as a non-Jewish and, therefore, authentically German invention. Skladanowsky's support for the Nazi embrace of his work came during a time of poverty and may have been motivated by profit. The Nazis had some ambivalence about his work due to his Polish ancestry and because he had fabricated some of his chronology to exaggerate his influence. By the time of his death in 1939, the Nazis' interest in his work had declined.

== Legacy ==
Between the years 1895 and 1905, the brothers directed at least 25 to 30 short movies. In 1995, the German filmmaker Wim Wenders directed a drama documentary film, Die Gebrüder Skladanowsky, in collaboration with students of the Munich Academy for Television and Film, in which Max Skladanowsky was played by Udo Kier.

== Trivia ==
In the Netherlands and the Balkans, the word "bioscop" means "cinema".

== Filmography ==
Komisches Reck (1895)

Jongleur (1895)

Kamarinskaja (1895)

Ringkämpfer (1895)

- 1895 : Bauerntanz zweier Kinder
- 1895 : Komisches Reck
- 1895 : Die Serpentintänzerin
- 1895 : Jongleur
- 1895 : Das Boxende Känguruh
- 1895 : Akrobatisches Potpourri
- 1895 : Kamarinskaja
- 1895 : Ringkämpfer
- 1895 : Apotheose
- 1896 : Unter den Linden
- 1896 : Nicht mehr allein
- 1896 : Mit Ablösung der Wache
- 1896 : Lustige Gesellschaft vor dem Tivoli in Kopenhagen
- 1896 : Leben und Treiben am Alexanderplatz
- 1896 : Komische Begenung im Tiergarten zu Stockholm
- 1896 : Ausfahrt nach dem Alarm
- 1896 : Ankunft eines Eisenbahnzuges
- 1896 : Alarm der Feuerwehr
- 1896 : Die Wachtparade
- 1897 : Am Bollwerk in Stettin
- 1897 : Apotheose II
- 1897 : Am Bollwerk
- 1900 : Eine Moderne Jungfrau von Orleans
- 1905 : Eine Fliegenjagd oder Die Rache der Frau Schultze

== See also ==
- List of film formats
