= Lélia Wanick Salgado =

Brazilian author, film producer, and environmentalist

Lélia Wanick Salgado (born on July 1, 1946), is a Brazilian author, film producer and environmentalist. She directs the photo press agency Amazonas Images that she founded in 2004 with husband Sebastião Salgado.

Salgado was born in 1946 in Vitória, Espírito Santo, Brazil. She started her professional life at 17 when she became a primary school and piano teacher. She holds a degree in architecture from the Ecole National Supérieure de Beaux Arts and Urbanism at the Paris VIII University.

She met Sebastião Salgado in 1964 and married in 1967. The political situation in Brazil and the opposition they expressed against it led them to leave Brazil and move to France. Her career includes curating Sebastião Salgado's photos, founding Photo Revue and Longue Vue magazines, managing a Magnum Agency photo gallery, and organizing cultural events in photography. In recognition of the production of the documentary The Salt of the Earth, she was nominated for an Oscar Award in 2015 for Best Feature Documentary. It won the 2014 Audience Award at the San Sebastián International Film Festival and the 2015 Audience Award at the Tromsø International Film Festival. It also won the César Award for Best Documentary Film at the 40th César Awards.

In 1998, Salgado and her husband created InstitutoTerra, an environmental organization that aims to promote the restoration of the Rio Doce valley. Instituto Terra, besides promoting reforestation, promotes environmental education, scientific research, and sustainable development.
