= Juliano Ribeiro Salgado =

Brazilian cinematographer and screenwriter (born 1974)

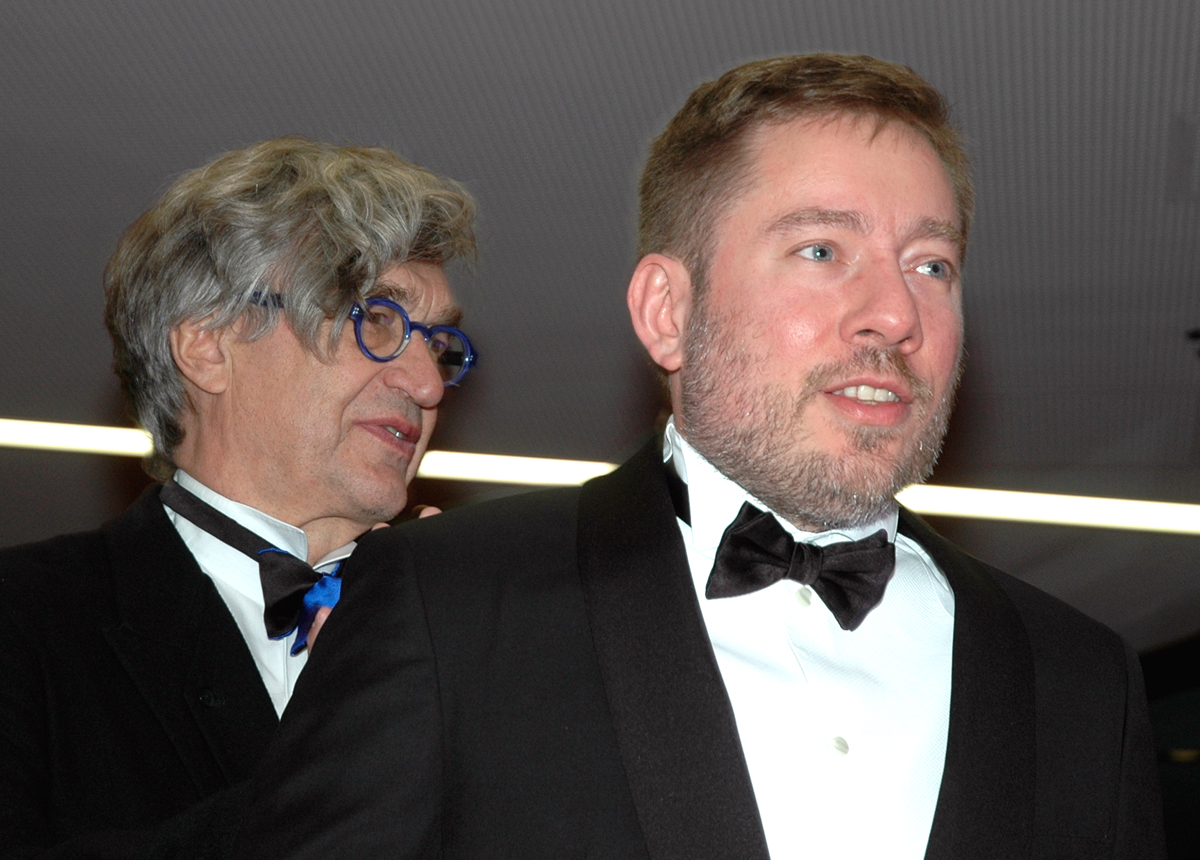
Juliano Ribeiro Salgado and Wim Wenders at Munich International Film festival 2014 for the film The Salt of the Earth.

Juliano Ribeiro Salgado (born in 1974) is a Brazilian filmmaker, director, and writer. He was nominated for an Oscar for Best Documentary Feature in 2015 for his work on The Salt of the Earth.

== Personal life ==
He is the son of photographer Sebastião Salgado and architect Lélia Wanick Salgado. Juliano Ribeiro has a son, Flavio.

== Partial filmography ==
- Paris la métisse (2005)
- Nauru, An Island Adrift (2009)
- The Salt of the Earth (2014) – director together with Wim Wenders

== Awards ==
Juliano works as a movie director since 1996. He won the César award for best documentary in 2015 , an award in Cannes in the "Un Certain Regard" section in 2014, and won the Best Foreign long film award for Brazilian Cinema in 2016, all for "O Sal da Terra".
