= Boxing Kangaroo (film) =

1895 film directed by Max Skladanowsky

- Directed by: Max Skladanowsky
- Produced by: Max Skladanowsky
- Starring: Mr. Delaware
- Cinematography: Max Skladanowsky
- Distributed by: Skladanowsky (Berlin)
- Release date: 1 November 1895
- Country: German Empire
- Language: Silent

Boxing Kangaroo (German: Das Boxende Känguruh) is an 1895 German short black-and-white silent documentary film, directed and produced by Max Skladanowsky, which features a kangaroo boxing against a man against a white background at the Circus Busch. The film, which premiered at the first public projection of motion pictures in Germany on 1 November 1895, was filmed on 35 mm film and is 18 feet in length.

The "groundbreaking production", was, according to WildFilmHistory, "a huge success", which, "despite being intended for entertainment rather than as a scientific behaviour study", "revealed animal actions in a way that had never been seen before", and, "exposed the potential for future films concerning wildlife and natural history".
