= Road movie =

Film genre in which the main characters embark on a road trip

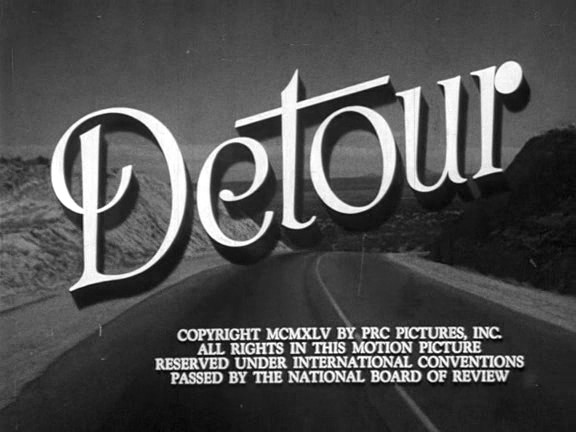
Edgar G. Ulmer’s Detour (1945), a film noir about a musician travelling from New York City to Hollywood, who sees a nation absorbed by greed.

A road movie is a genre of film in which the main characters leave home on a road trip, typically altering the perspective from their everyday lives. Road movies often depict travel in the hinterlands, with the films exploring the theme of alienation and examining the tensions and issues of the cultural identity of a nation or historical period; this is all often enmeshed in a mood of actual or potential menace, lawlessness, and violence, a "distinctly existential air" and is populated by restless, "frustrated, often desperate characters". The settings include the close confines of the car as it moves on highways and roads, and booths in diners and rooms in roadside motels, all of which helps to create intimacy and tension between the characters. Road movies tend to focus on the theme of masculinity (with the man often going through some type of crisis), some type of rebellion, car culture, and self-discovery. The core theme of road movies is "rebellion against conservative social norms".

There are two main narratives: the quest and the outlaw chase. In the quest-style film, the story meanders as the characters make discoveries (e.g., Two-Lane Blacktop from 1971). In outlaw road movies, in which the characters are fleeing from law enforcement, there is usually more sex and violence (e.g., Natural Born Killers from 1994). Road films tend to focus more on characters' internal conflicts and transformations, based on their feelings as they experience new realities on their trip, rather than on the dramatic movement-based sequences that predominate in action films. Road movies do not typically use the standard three-act structure used in mainstream films; instead, an "open-ended, rambling plot structure" is used.

The road movie keeps its characters "on the move", and as such the "car, the tracking shot, [and] wide and wild open space" are important iconography elements, similar to a Western movie. As well, the road movie is similar to a Western in that road films are also about a "frontiersmanship" and about the codes of discovery (often self-discovery). Road movies often use the music from the car stereo, which the characters are listening to, as the soundtrack and in 1960s and 1970s road movies, rock music is often used (e.g., Easy Rider from 1969 used a rock soundtrack of songs from Jimi Hendrix, The Byrds and Steppenwolf).

While early road movies from the 1930s focused on couples, in post-World War II films, usually the travellers are male buddies, although in some cases, women are depicted on the road, either as temporary companions, or more rarely, as the protagonist couple (e.g., Thelma & Louise from 1991). The genre can also be parodied, or have protagonists that depart from the typical heterosexual couple or buddy paradigm, as with The Adventures of Priscilla, Queen of the Desert (1994), which depicts a group of drag queens who tour the Australian desert. Other examples of the increasing diversity of the drivers shown in 1990s and subsequent decades' road films are The Living End (1992), about two gay, HIV-positive men on a road trip; To Wong Foo, Thanks for Everything! Julie Newmar (1995), which is about drag queens, and Smoke Signals (1998), which is about two Indigenous men. While rare, there are some road movies about large groups on the road (Get on the Bus from 1996) and lone drivers (Vanishing Point from 1971).

== Genre and production elements ==
The road movie has been called an elusive and ambiguous film genre. Timothy Corrigan states that road movies are a "knowingly impure" genre as they have "overdetermined and built-in genre-blending tendencies". Devin Orgeron states that road movies, despite their literal focus on car trips, are "about the [history of] the cinema, about the culture of the image", with road movies created with a mixture of Classical Hollywood film genres. The road movie genre developed from a "constellation of “solid” modernity, combining locomotion and media-motion" to get "away from the sedentarising forces of modernity and produc[e] contingency".

Road movies are blended with other genres to create a number of subgenres, including: road horror (e.g., Near Dark from 1987); road comedies (e.g., Flirting with Disaster from 1996); road racing films (e.g., Death Race 2000 from 1975) and rock concert tour films (e.g., Almost Famous from 2000). Film noir road movies include Detour (1945), Desperate, The Devil Thumbs a Ride (1947) and The Hitch-Hiker (1953), all of which "establish fear and suspense around hitchhiking", and the outlaw-themed film noirs They Live by Night (1948) and Gun Crazy. Film noir-influenced road films continued in the neo noir era, with The Hitcher (1986), Delusion (1991), Red Rock West (1993), and Joy Ride (2001).

Even though road movies are a significant and popular genre, it is an "overlooked strain of film history". Major genre studies often do not examine road movies, and there has been little analysis of what qualifies as a road movie.

== Country or region of production ==
=== United States ===
The road movie is mostly associated with the United States, as it focuses on "peculiarly American dreams, tensions and anxieties". US road movies examine the tension between the two foundational myths of American culture, which are individualism and populism, which leads to some road films depicting the open road as a "utopian fantasy" with a homogenous culture while others show it as a "dystopian nightmare" of extreme cultural differences. US road movies depict the wide open, vast spaces of the highways as symbolizing the "scale and notionally utopian" opportunities to move up upwards and outwards in life.

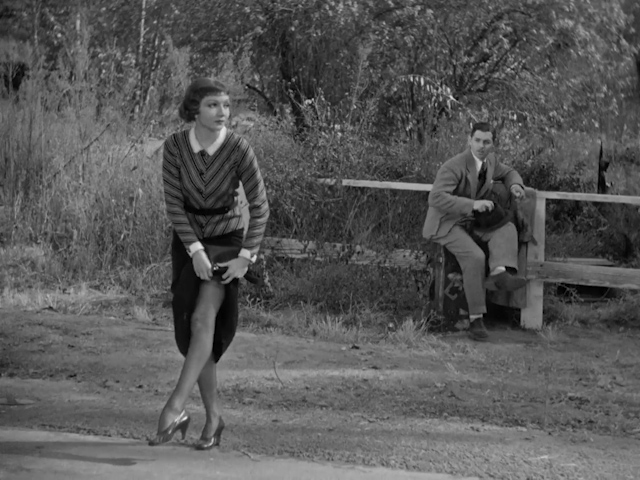
It Happened One Night (1934) is about a rich woman who learns about regular Americans when she travels the highway system by car.

In American road movies, the road is an "alternative space" where the characters, now set apart from conventional society, can experience transformation. For example, in It Happened One Night (1934), a wealthy woman who goes on the road is liberated from her elite background and marriage to an immoral husband when she meets and experiences hospitality from regular, good-hearted Americans who she never would have met in her previous life, with middle America depicted as a utopia of "real community". The scenes in road movies tend to elicit longing for a mythic past.

American road movies have tended to be a white genre, with Spike Lee's Get on the Bus (1996) being a notable exception, as its main characters are African-American men on a bus travelling to the Million Man March (the film depicts the historic role of buses in the American civil rights movement). Asian-American filmmakers have used the road movie to examine the role and treatment of Asian-Americans in the United States; examples include Wayne Wang's Chan Is Missing (1982), about a taxi driver trying to find about the Hollywood detective character Charlie Chan, and Abraham Lim's Roads and Bridges (2001), about an Asian-American prisoner who is sentenced to clean up garbage along a Midwestern highway.

=== Australia ===
Australia's vast open spaces and concentrated population have made the road movie a key genre in that country, with films such as George Miller's influential Mad Max film series, which were rooted in an Australian tradition for films with "dystopian and noir themes with the destructive power of cars and the country’s harsh, sparsely populated land mass". Australian road movies have been described as having a dystopian or gothic tone, as the road the characters travel on is often a "dead end", with the journey being more about "inward-looking" exploration than reaching the intended location. In Australia, road movies have been called a "complex metaphor" which refers to the country's history, current situation, and to anxieties about the future. The Mad Max series, including the first film and its sequels Mad Max 2, Mad Max Beyond Thunderdome, Mad Max: Fury Road and Furiosa: A Mad Max Saga "have become canonical for their dystopic reinvention of the outback as a post-human wasteland where survival depends upon manic driving skills".

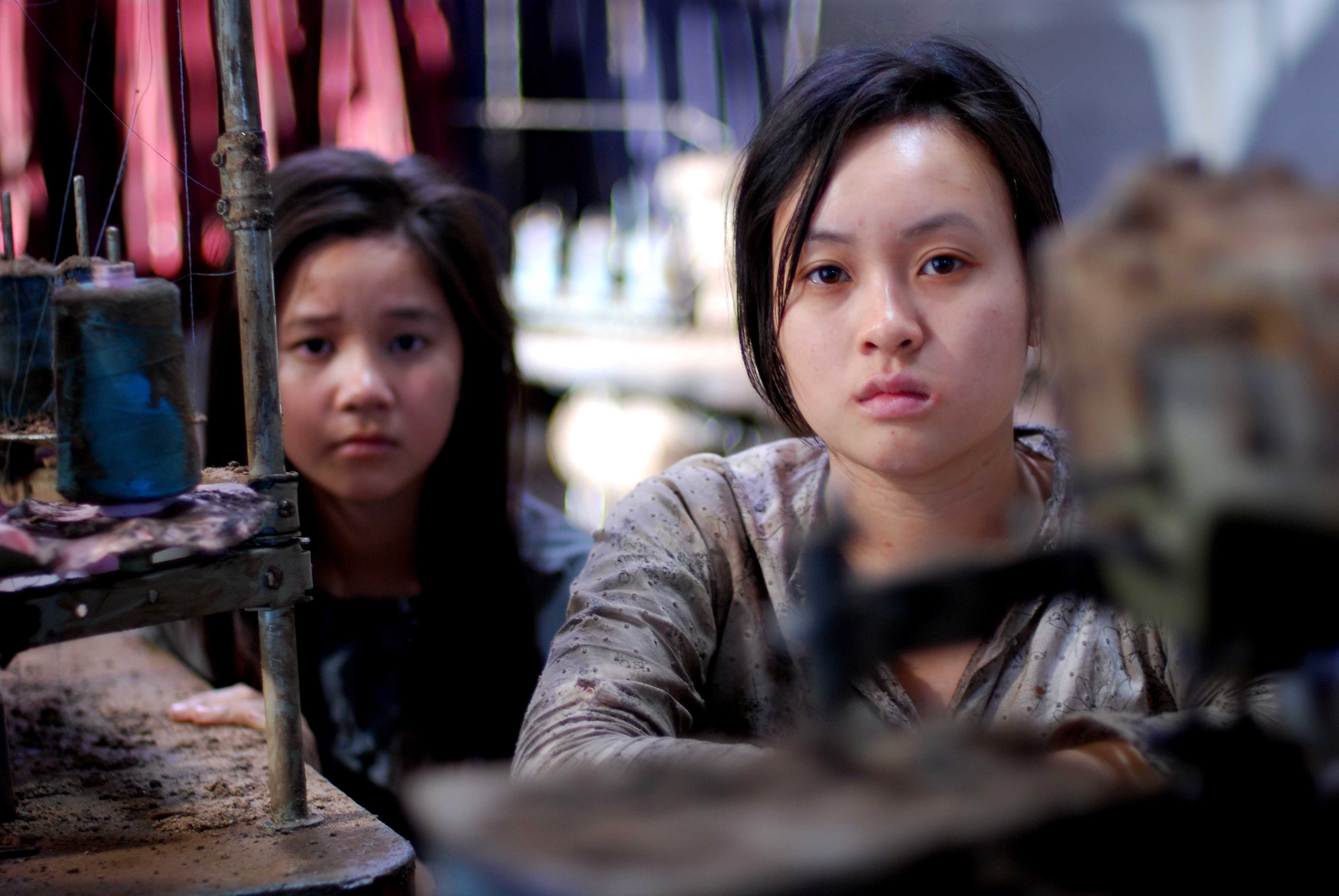
The 2010 film Mother Fish, which depicts travel over water, has been called a "No Road"-style road film, as it uses the road movie journey narrative without using roads as a setting.

Other Australian road movies include Peter Weir's The Cars That Ate Paris (1974), about a small town where the inhabitants cause road accidents to salvage the vehicles; the biker film Stone (1974) by Sandy Harbutt, about a biker gang who witness a political cover-up murder; The (1981) thriller Roadgames by Richard Franklin, about a truck driver who tracks down a serial killer in the Australian outback; Dead-end Drive-in (1986) by Brian Trenchard-Smith, about a dystopian future where drive-in theatres are turned into detention centres; Metal Skin (1994) by Geoffrey Wright about a street racer; and Kiss or Kill (1997) by Bill Bennett, a film noir-style road movie.

The Adventures of Priscilla, Queen of the Desert (1994) has been called a "watershed gay road movie that addresses diversity in Australia". Walkabout (1971), Backroads (1977), and Rabbit-Proof Fence (2002) use a depiction of travelling through the Australian outback to address the issue of relations between white and Indigenous people.

In 2005, Fiona Probyn described a subgenre of road movies about Indigenous Australians that she called "No Road" movies, in that they typically do not show a vehicle travelling on an asphalt road; instead, these films depict travel on a trail, often with Indigenous trackers being shown using their tracking abilities to discern hard-to-detect clues on the trail. With the increasing depiction of racial minorities in Australian road movies, the "No Road" subgenre has also been associated with Asian-Australian films that depict travel using routes other than roads (e.g., the 2010 film Mother Fish, which depicts travel over water as it tells the story of the boat people refugees). The iconography of car crashes in many Australian road movies (particularly the Mad Max series) has been called a symbol of white-Indigenous violence, a rupture point in the narrative which erases and forgets the history of this violence.

=== Canada ===
Canada also has huge expanses of territory, which make the road movie also common in that country, where the genre is used to examine "themes of alienation and isolation in relation to an expansive, almost foreboding landscape of seemingly endless space", and explore how Canadian identity differs from the "less humble and self-conscious neighbours to the south", in United States. Canadian road films include Donald Shebib's Goin' Down the Road (1970), three Bruce McDonald films (Roadkill (1989), Highway 61 (1991), and Hard Core Logo (1996), a mockumentary about a punk rock band's road tour), Malcolm Ingram's Tail Lights Fade (1999) and Gary Burns' The Suburbanators (1995). David Cronenberg's Crash (1996) depicted drivers who get "perverse sexual arousal through the car crash experience", a subject matter which led to Ted Turner lobbying against the film being shown in US theatres.

Asian-Canadian filmmakers have made road films about the experience of Canadians of Asian origin, such as Ann Marie Fleming's The Magical Life of Long Tak Sam, which is about her search for her "Chinese grandfather, an itinerant magician and acrobat". Other Asian-Canadian road movies look at their relatives experiences during the 1940s internment of Japanese Canadians by the Canadian government (e.g., Lise Yasui's Family Gathering (1988), Rea Tajiri's History and Memory (1991) and Janet Tanaka's Memories from the Department of Amnesia (1991).

=== Europe ===
European filmmakers of road movies appropriate the conventions established by American directors, while at the same time reformulating these approaches, by de-emphasizing the speed of the driver on the road, increasing the amount of introspection (often on themes such as national identity), and depicting the road trip as a search on the part of the characters.

The German filmmaker Wim Wenders explored the American themes of road movies through his European reference point in his Road Movie trilogy in the mid-1970s. They include Alice in the Cities (1974), The Wrong Move (1975), and Kings of the Road (1976). All three films were shot by cinematographer Robby Müller and mostly take place in West Germany. Kings of the Road includes stillness, which is unusual for road movies, and quietness (except for the rock soundtrack). Other road movies by Wenders include Paris, Texas and Until the End of the World. Wender's road movies "filter nomadic excursions through a pensive Germanic lens" and depict "somber drifters coming to terms with their internal scars".

France has a road movie tradition than stretches from Bertrand Blier's Les Valseuses (1973) and Agnès Varda's Sans toit ni loi (about a homeless woman) to 1990s films such as Merci la vie (1991) and Virginie Despentes and Coralie Trinh Thi's Baise-moi (a controversial film about two women revenging a rape), to 2000s films such as Laurent Cantet's L'emploi du temps (2001) and Cédric Kahn's Feux rouges (2004). While French road movies share the US road movie's focus on the theme of individual freedom, French movies also balance this value with equality and fraternity, according to the French Republican model of liberty-equality-fraternity.

Neil Archer states that French and other Francophone (e.g., Belgium, Switzerland) road films focus on "displacement and identity", notably in regards to maghrebin immigrants and young people (e.g., Yamina Benguigui's Inch'Allah Dimanche (2001), Ismaël Ferroukhi's La Fille de Keltoum (2001) and Tony Gatlif's Exils (2004). More broadly, European films are tending to use imagery of border-crossing and focusing on "marginal identities and economic migration", which can be seen in Lukas Moodysson's Lilja 4-ever (2002), Michael Winterbottom's In This World (2002) and Ulrich Seidl's Import/Export (2007). European road movies also examine post-colonialism, "disclocation, memory and identity".

Road movies from Spain have a strong American influence, with the films incorporating the road movie-comedy genre hybrid made popular in US films such as Peter Farrelly's Dumb and Dumber (1994). Spanish films including Los años bárbaros, Carretera y manta, Trileros, Al final del Camino, and Airbag, which has been called the "most successful Spanish road movie of all time". Airbag, along with Slam (2003), El mundo alrededor (2006) and Los managers, are examples of Spanish road films that, like US movies such as Road Trip, uses the "road movie genre as a narrative framework for...gross-out sex comedy".

The director of Airbag, Juanma Bajo Ulloa, states that he aimed to make fun of the road movie genre as established in North America, while still using the metamorphosis through road trip narrative that is popular in the genre (in this case, the main male character rejects his upper class girlfriend in favour of a prostitute he meets on the road). Airbag also uses Spanish equivalents to the stock road movie setting and iconography, depicting "deserts, casinos and road clubs" and use the road movie action sequences (chases, car explosions, and crashes) that remind the viewer of similar work by Tony Scott and Oliver Stone.

A second subtype of Spanish road movies is more influenced by the female road movies from the US, such as Martin Scorsese's Alice Doesn't Live Here Anymore (1974), Jonathan Demme's Crazy Mama (1975), Ridley Scott's Thelma & Louise (1991), and Herbert Ross' Boys on the Side (1995), in that they show a "less traditional" and more "visible, innovative, introspective, and realistic" type of woman onscreen. Spanish road movies about women include Hola, ¿estás sola?, Lisboa, Fugitivas, Retorno a Hansala, and Sin Dejar Huella address social issues about women, such as the "injustice and mistreatment" that women experience under "authoritarian patriarchal order."

Fugitivas depicts an American road movie genre convention: the "disintegration of the family and the community" and the "journey of transformation", as it depicts two fugitives on the run, whose distrust fades as the two women learn to trust each other from their adventures on the road. The images in the film are blend of homage to US road movie conventions (gas stations, billboards) and "recognizable Spanish types", such as the "embittered drunkard".

Other European road films include Ingmar Bergman's Wild Strawberries (1957), about an old professor travelling the roads of Sweden and picking up hitchhikers and Jean-Luc Godard's Pierrot le fou (1965) about law-breaking lovers escaping on the road. Both of these films, as well as Roberto Rossellini's Voyage in Italy (1953) and Godard's Weekend (1967) have more "existential sensibility" or pauses for "philosophical digressions of a European bent", as compared with American road films. Three Men and a Leg (1997) features several sketches from filmmakers and producers' Aldo, Giovanni & Giacomo's previous comedy productions overlaid with the rest of the movie's road-trip and romantic comedy atmosphere. Rocco Papaleo's Basilicata Coast to Coast (2010) departs from the classic vehicle-based road movie due to the characters' choice to travel on foot, inviting a slower pace and reflection.

Other European road films include Chris Petit's Radio On (1979), a Wim Wenders-influenced film set on the M4 motorway; Aki Kaurismäki's Leningrad Cowboys Go America (1989), about a fictional Russian rock band which travels to the US; and Theo Angelopoulos' Landscape in the Mist, about a road trip from Greece to Germany.

=== Latin America ===
Road movies made in Latin America are similar in feel to European road films. Latin American road movies are usually about a cast of characters, rather than a couple or single person, and the films explore the differences between urban and rural regions and between north and south. Luis Buñuel's Subida al Cielo (Mexican Bus Ride, 1951), is about a poor rural person's trip into a big city to help his mother, who is dying. The road trip on this film is shown as a "carnivalesque pilgrimage" or "travelling circus", an approach also used in Bye Bye Brazil (1979, Brazil), Guantanamera (1995, Cuba), and Central do Brasil (Central Station, 1998, Brazil).

Some Latin American road movies are also set in the era of conquest, such as Cabeza de Vaca (1991, Mexico). Movies about outlaws escaping from justice include Profundo Carmesí (Deep Crimson, 1996, Mexico) and El Camino (The Road, 2000, Argentina). Y tu mamá también (And Your Mother Too, 2001, Mexico) is about two young male buddies who have sexual adventures on the road.

=== Countries of the former USSR ===
Movies involving road movie genre while being rejected by mainstream media, gained huge popularity in Russian art cinema and surrounding post-Soviet cultures, slowly building their way into international film festivals. Well-known examples are My Joy (2010), Bimmer (2003), Major (2013), and How Vitka Chesnok Took Lyokha Shtyr to the Home for Invalids (2017). Some other movies incorporate a large portion of road movie style, for example Morphine (2008), Leviathan (2014), Cargo 200 (2007), Donbass (2018).

With themes ranging from crime, corruption and power to history, addiction and existence, road movies became an independent part of cinematic landscape. From the strong flow of existentialism, to the black comedy style, the road movie experienced a new revival. Most precious are pieces from Sergei Loznitsa, in his early work My Joy (2010) he used black noir style to tell the story of people falling together with destruction of governments after the fall of the Soviet Union. In his later work Donbass (2018), he takes an opposing style, turning to black comedy and satire to underline actual war tragedies in the Russo-Ukrainian War.

=== India ===
Indian screens saw a series of road movies with experimental filmmaker Ram Gopal Varma's works such as Kshana Kshanam. Rachel Dwyer, a reader in world cinema at the University of London-Department of South Asia, marked Varma's contribution into the new-age film noir. The film received critical reception at the Ann Arbor Film Festival, which led to a series of genre-benders like Mani Ratnam's Thiruda Thiruda, and Varma's Daud, Anaganaga Oka Roju and Road. Subsequently 21st century bollywood movies witnessed a surge of motion-pictures such as Road, Movie, nominated for the Tokyo Sakura Grand Prix Award, the Tribeca Film Festival, and the Generation 14plus at the 60th Berlin International Film Festival in 2010.

Liars Dice explores the story of a young mother from a remote village who, going in search of her missing husband, goes missing, the film examines the human cost of migration to cities and the exploitation of migrant workers. It was India's Official Entry for the Best Foreign Language Film for the 87th Academy Awards. It won special prize at Sofia International Film Festival. In Karwaan, the protagonist is forced to set out on a road trip from Bengaluru to Kochi after he loses his father in an accident, but the body delivered to him is of the mother of a woman in another state.

Ryan Gilbey of The Guardian was broadly positive about Zoya Akhtar's Zindagi Na Milegi Dobara; he wrote, "It's still playing to full houses, and you can see why. Slick it may be. But tourist board employees representing the various Spanish cities flattered in the movie are not the only ones who will come out grinning", and that he found the movie "stubbornly un-macho" for a buddy film. Piku tells the story of the short-tempered Piku Banerjee (Deepika Padukone), her grumpy, aging father Bhashkor (Amitabh Bachchan) and Rana Chaudhary (Irrfan Khan), who is stuck between the father-daughter duo, as they embark on a journey from Delhi to Kolkata.

In Nagesh Kukunoor's children's film Dhanak a blind kid and his sister set off alone on a 300 km journey traversing testing Indian terrain from Jaislamer to Jodhpur, the film won the Crystal Bear Grand Prix for Best Children's Film, and Special Mention for the Best Feature Film by The Children's Jury for Generation Kplus at the 65th Berlin International Film Festival Finding Fanny is based on a road trip set in Goa and follows the journey of five dysfunctional friends who set out on a road trip in search of Fanny. The Good Road is told in a hyperlink format, where several stories are intertwined, with the center of the action being a highway in the rural lands of Gujarat near a town in Kutch.

=== Africa ===
Several road movies have been produced in Africa, including Cocorico! Monsieur Poulet (1977, Niger); The Train of Salt and Sugar (2016, Mozambique); Hayat (2016, Morocco); Touki Bouki (1973, Senegal) and Borders (2017, Burkina Faso).

== History ==
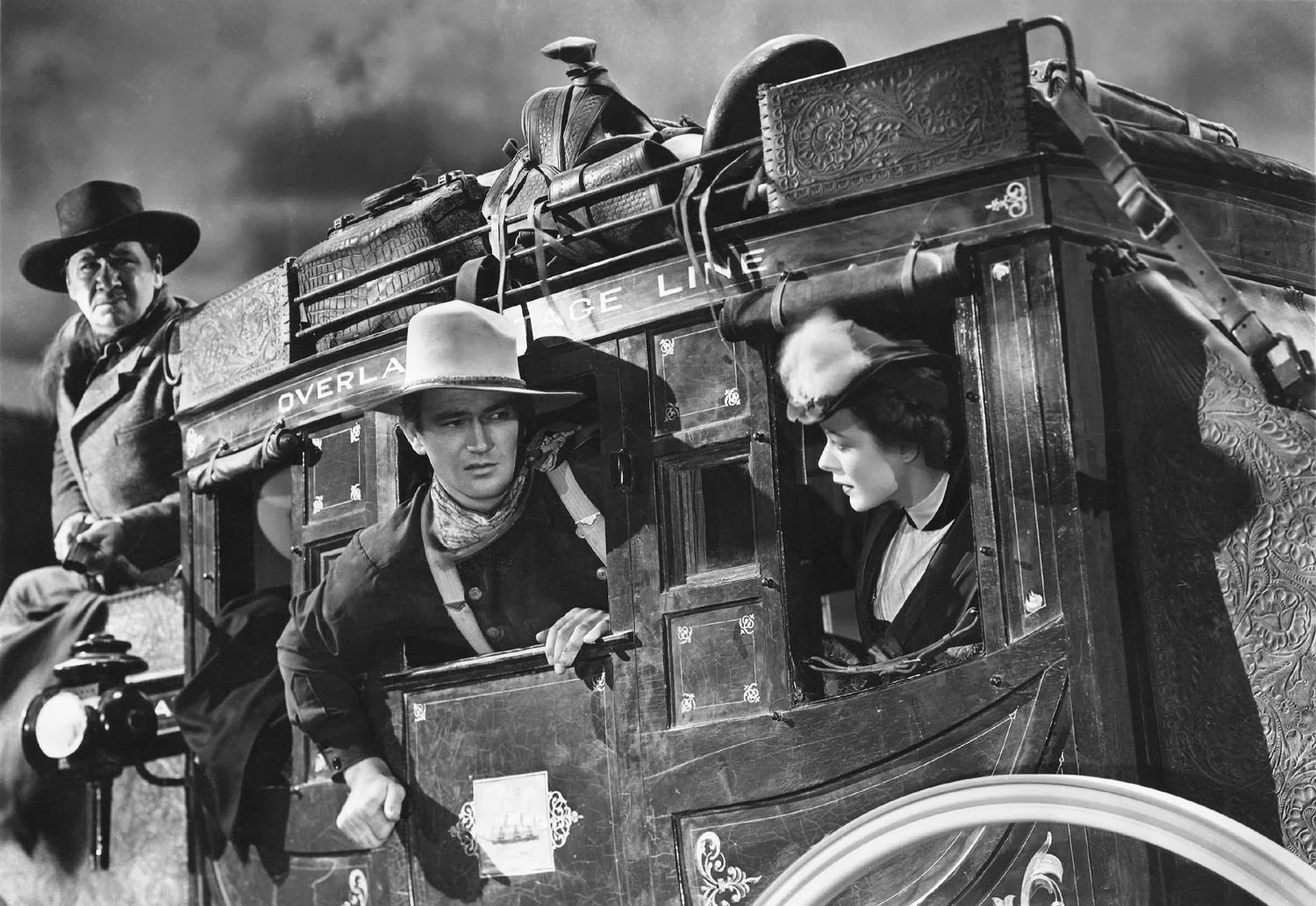
John Ford's 1939 Western Stagecoach has been called a proto-road movie.

The genre has its roots in spoken and written tales of epic journeys, such as the Odyssey and the Aeneid. The road film is a standard plot employed by screenwriters. It is a type of bildungsroman, a story in which the hero changes, grows or improves over the course of the story. It focuses more on the journey rather than the goal. David Laderman lists other literary influences on the road movie, such as Don Quixote (1615), which uses a description of a journey to create social satire; The Adventures of Huckleberry Finn (1884), a story about a journey down the Mississippi River that is full of social commentary; Heart of Darkness (1902), about a journey down a river in the Belgian Congo to search for a rogue colonial trader; and Women in Love (1920), which describes "travel and mobility" while also providing social commentary about the woes of industrialization. Laderman states that Women in Love particularly lays the groundwork for the future road films, as it showed a couple who rebelled against social norms by leaving their familiar location and going on an aimless, meandering journey.

Steinbeck's novel The Grapes of Wrath (1939) depicts a family that struggles to survive on the road during the Great Depression, a book that has been called "America's best-known proletarian road saga". The movie version of the novel, made a year later, depicts the hungry, weary family's travel on Route 66 using "montage sequences, reflected images of the road on windshields and mirrors", and shots taken from the driver's point of view to create a sense of movement and place. Even though Henry Miller's The Air-Conditioned Nightmare (1947) is not a fictional work, it captures the mood of frustration, restlessness and aimlessness that became prevalent in the road movie. In the book, which describe's Miller's cross-country journey across the United States, he criticizes the nation's descent into materialism.

Western films such as John Ford's Stagecoach (1939) have been called "proto-road movies". In the film, an unusual group of travellers, including a banker, prostitute, escaped prisoner and a military officer's wife, move through the dangerous desert trails. Even though the travellers are so unlike each other, the mutual danger they must face in travelling through Geronimo's Apache territory requires them to work together to create a "utopia of...community". The difference between older stories about wandering characters and the road movie is technological: with road movies, the hero travels by car, motorcycle, bus or train, making road movies a representation of modernity's advantages and social ills.

The on-the-road plot was used at the birth of American cinema but blossomed in the years after World War II, reflecting a boom in automobile production and the growth of youth culture. Early road movies have been criticized by some progressives for their "casual misogyny", "fear of otherness", and for not examining issues such as power, privilege, and gender and for mostly showing white people.

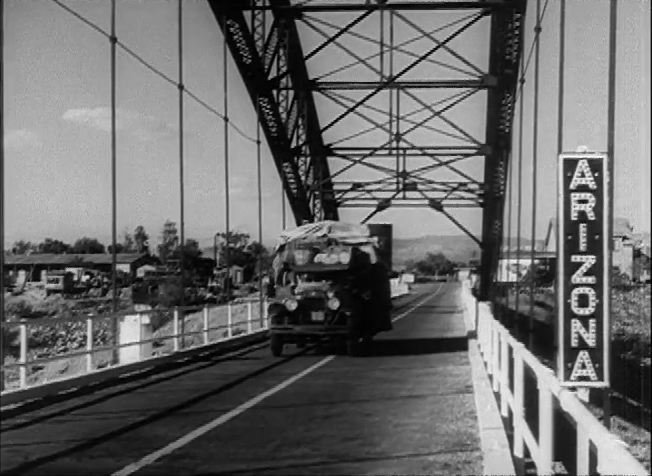
The Grapes of Wrath (1940) is about an entire family on the road.

The road movie of the pre-WW II era was changed by the publication of Jack Kerouac's On the Road in 1957, as it sketched out the future for the road movie and provided its "master narrative" of exploration, questing, and journeying. The book includes many descriptions of driving in cars. It also depicted the character Sal Paradise, a middle class college student who goes on the road to seek material for his writing career, a bounded journey with a clear start and finish which differs from the open ended wandering of previous films, with characters making chance encounters with other drivers who influence where one travels or ends up. To contrast the intellectual Sal character, Kerouac has the juvenile delinquent Dean, a wild, fast-driving character who represents the idea that the road provides liberation.

By depicting a movie character who was marginalized and who could not be incorporated into mainstream American culture, Kerouac opened the way for road movies to depict a more diverse range of characters, rather than just heterosexual couples (e.g., It Happened One Night), groups on the move (e.g., The Grapes of Wrath), notably the pair of male buddies. On the Road and another novel published in the same era, Vladimir Nabokov's novel Lolita (1955), have been called "two monumental road novels that rip back and forth across American with a subversive erotic charge."

In the 1950s, there were "wholesome" road comedies such as Bob Hope and Bing Crosby's Road to Bali (1952), Vincente Minnelli's The Long, Long Trailer (1954) and the Dean Martin and Jerry Lewis film Hollywood or Bust (1956). There were not many 1950s road films, but "postwar youth culture" was depicted in The Wild One (1953) and Rebel Without a Cause (1955).

Timothy Corrigan states that post-WW II, the genre of road films became more codified, with features solidifying such as the use of characters experiencing "amnesia, hallucinations and theatrical crisis". David Laderman states that road movies have a modernist aesthetic approach, as they focus on "rebellion, social criticism, and liberating thrills", which shows "disillusionment" with mainstream political and aesthetic norms. Awareness of the "road picture" as a separate genre came only in the 1960s with Bonnie and Clyde and Easy Rider. Road movies were an important genre in the late 1960s and 1970s era of the New Hollywood, with films such as Terrence Malick's Badlands and Richard Sarafian's Vanishing Point (1971) showing an influence from Bonnie and Clyde.

There may have been influences from French cinema in the creation of Bonnie and Clyde; David Newman and Robert Benton have stated that they were influenced by Jean-Luc Godard's A bout de souffle (1960) and François Truffaut's Tirez sur la pianiste (1960). More generally, Devin Orgeron states that American road movies were based on post-WW II European cinema's own take on the American road film approach, showing a mutual influence between US and European filmmakers in this genre.

The addition of violence to the sexual tension of road movies in the late 1960s and in subsequent decades can be seen as a way to create more excitement and "frisson". From the 1930s to 1960s, merely showing a man and woman on a road trip was exciting for audience, as all the motel stays and closeness had implied, yet deferred, consummation of the sexual attraction between the characters (sex could not be depicted due to the Motion Picture Production Code). With Bonnie and Clyde (1967) and Natural Born Killers (1994), the heterosexual couple are united by their involvement in murder; as well, with jail hanging over their heads, there can be no return to domestic life at the end of the film.

There have been three historical eras of the "outlaw-rebel" road movie: the post-WW II film noir era (e.g., Detour), the late 1960s era which was rocked by the Vietnam War (Easy Rider and Bonnie and Clyde), and the post-Reagan era of the 1990s, when the "masculinist heroics of the Gulf War gave way to closer scrutiny" (My Own Private Idaho, Thelma & Louise and Natural Born Killers). In the 1970s, there were low-budget outlaw films depicting chases, such as Eddie Macon's Run. In the 1980s, there were rural Southern road movies such as Smokey and the Bandit and the Cannonball Run chase films of 1981 and 1984. The outlaw couple movie was reinvented in the 1990s with a postmodernist take in films such as Wild at Heart, Kalifornia and True Romance.

While the first road movies described the discovery of new territories or pushing the boundaries of a nation, which was a core message of early Western films in the United States, road movies were later used to show how national identities were changing, such as which Edgar G. Ulmer’s Detour (1945), a film noir about a musician travelling from New York City to Hollywood who sees a nation absorbed by greed, or Dennis Hopper’s Easy Rider, which showed how American society was transformed by the social and cultural trends of the late 1960s. The New Hollywood era films made use of the new film technologies in the road movie genre, such as "fast film stock" and lightweight cameras, as well as incorporating filmmaking approaches from European cinema, such as "elliptical narrative structure and self-reflexive devices, elusive development of alienated characters; bold traveling shots and montage sequences.

Road movies have been called a post-WW II genre, as they track key post-war cultural trends, such as the breakup of the traditional family structure, in which male roles were destabilized; there is focus on menacing events which impact the characters who are on the move; there is an association between the character and the mode of transportation being used (e.g., a car or motorcycle), with the car symbolizing the self in the modern culture; and there is usually a focus on men, with women typically being excluded, creating a "male escapist fantasy linking masculinity to technology". Despite these examples of the post-WW II aspects of road movies, Cohan and Hark argue that road movies go back to the 1930s.

In the 2000s, a new crop of road movies was produced, including Vincent Gallo's Brown Bunny (2003), Alexander Payne's Sideways (2004), Jim Jarmusch's Broken Flowers (2005) and Kelly Reichardt's Old Joy (2006) and scholars are taking more interest in examining the genre. The British Film Institute highlights ten post-2000 road films that show that "[t]here’s still plenty of gas left in the road movie genre".

The BFI's top 10 include Andrea Arnold’s American Honey (2016), which used "mostly non-professional actors"; Alfonso Cuarón's Y tu mamá también (2001), about Mexican teens on the road; The Brown Bunny (2003), which garnered publicity for its "infamous fellatio scene"; Walter Salles' The Motorcycle Diaries (2004), about Che Guevera's epic motorcycle trip; Mark Duplass and Jay Duplass' The Puffy Chair (2005), the "first mumblecore road movie"; Broken Flowers (2005); Jonathan Dayton and Valerie Faris' Little Miss Sunshine (2006), about a family's trip in a VW camper van; Old Joy (2006); Alexander Payne's Nebraska (2013), which depicts a father and son on a road trip; Steven Knight's Locke (2013), about a construction executive taking stressful calls on a road trip; and Jafar Panahi's Taxi Tehran (2015), about a cab driver ferrying strange passengers around the city.

Timothy Corrigan has called the postmodern road movie a "borderless refuse bin" of "mise en abyme" reflection, reflecting a modern audience that is not able to think of a "naturalized history". Atkinson calls contemporary road movies an "ideogram of human desire and a last-ditch search for self" designed for an audience that was raised watching TV, particularly open-ended serial programs.

== Movies of this genre ==
Note, that the Country column is the country of origin and/or financing, and does not necessarily represent the country or countries depicted in each film.

Title	Year	Country	Distribution
A French Holiday	2018	United Kingdom, United States, France	Sony Pictures Releasing
A Perfect World	1993	United States	Warner Bros.
Adventures in Babysitting	1987	United States	Buena Vista Pictures
The Adventures of Huckleberry Finn	1939	United States	Metro-Goldwyn-Mayer
The Adventures of Priscilla, Queen of the Desert	1994	Australia	Gramercy Pictures
Alice in the Cities	1974	West Germany	Bauer International
Aloha, Bobby and Rose	1975	United States	Columbia Pictures
Alvin and the Chipmunks: The Road Chip	2015	United States	20th Century Fox
Ameerika Suvi (American Summer)	2016	Estonia	
American Honey	2016	United States	A24
Are We There Yet?	2005	United States, Canada	Columbia Pictures
As Crazy as It Gets	2015	Nigeria	
As Good as It Gets	1997	United States	TriStar Pictures
Badlands	1973	United States	Warner Bros.
Basilicata Coast to Coast	2010	Italy	
Beavis and Butt-Head Do America	1996	United States	Paramount Pictures
Bimmer	2003	Russia	
Black Sheep	1996	United States	Paramount Pictures
The Blue Bird	1940	United States	20th Century Fox
The Blues Brothers	1980	United States	Universal Pictures
Bones and All	2022	United States	Frenesy Film Company
Bonnie and Clyde	1967	United States	Warner Bros.
Boys on the Side	1995	United States	Warner Bros.
Breakdown	1997	United States	Paramount Pictures
The Bride Came C.O.D.	1941	United States	Warner Bros.
The Bucket List	2007	United States	Warner Bros.
Burn Burn Burn	2015	United Kingdom	Verve Pictures
Cactus	2008	Australia	Hoyts Distribution
The Cannonball Run	1981	United States, Hong Kong	20th Century Fox
Charlie	2015	India	RFT Films
Children Who Chase Lost Voices	2011	Japan	Media Factory
College Road Trip	2008	United States	Walt Disney Pictures
Come as You Are (aka Hasta la Vista)	2011	Belgium	Eureka Entertainment
Cop Car	2015	United States	Universal Home Entertainment
Coupe de Ville	1990	United States	Warner Bros.
Crossroads	2002	United States	Paramount Pictures
Death Proof	2007	United States	Dimension Films
Detroit Rock City	1999	United States	Base-12 Productions
Dhanak	2016	India	
Diary of a Wimpy Kid: The Long Haul	2017	United States	20th Century Fox
Dirty Girl	2010	United States	The Weinstein Company
Dirty Mary, Crazy Larry	1974	United States	20th Century Fox
Don’t Make Me Go	2022	United States	Amazon Studios
The Doom Generation	1995	United States	Trimark Pictures
Drive-Away Dolls	2024	United States	Focus Features
Drive My Car	2021	Japan	Bitters End (Japan)
Due Date	2010	United States	Warner Bros.
Duel	1971	United States	Universal Pictures
Dumb and Dumber	1994	United States	New Line Cinema
Dumb and Dumber To	2014	United States	Universal Pictures
Easy Rider	1969	United States	Sony Pictures Releasing
Ed, Edd n Eddy's Big Picture Show	2009	United States, Canada	Warner Bros. Television
Egghead & Twinkie	2023	United States	CanBeDone Films
EuroTrip	2004	United States, Czech Republic	DreamWorks Pictures
Eyjafjallajökull	2013	France	
Fanboys	2009	United States	The Weinstein Company
Fandango	1985	United States	Warner Bros.
The Fundamentals of Caring	2016	United States	Netflix
Gamyam	2008	India	
Gabby's Dollhouse: The Movie	2025	United States	Universal Pictures (via DreamWorks Animation)
Get on the Bus	1996	United States	Sony Pictures Releasing
God Bless America	2011	United States	Magnolia Pictures
Goin' Down the Road	1970	Canada	Chevron Pictures
Goodbye Berlin	2016	Germany	StudioCanal
Goodbye Pork Pie	1981	New Zealand	
A Goofy Movie	1995	United States	Buena Vista Pictures
The Grapes of Wrath	1940	United States	20th Century Fox
Grave of the Fireflies	1988	Japan	Toho
Green Book	2018	United States	Participant Media
The Guilt Trip	2012	United States	Paramount Pictures
Gypsy	2019	India	Olympia Pictures
Hacksaw	2020	United States	Midnight Releasing
Harold & Kumar Go to White Castle	2004	United States	New Line Cinema
Have Dreams, Will Travel	2007	United States	
Heavy Trip	2018	Finland	Making Movies
Heavier Trip	2024	Finland	Heimathafen Film
The Hills Have Eyes	1977	United States	Vanguard
The Hitcher	1986	United States	TriStar Pictures
Hitch-Hike	1977	Italy	
Huckleberry Finn	1931	United States	Paramount Pictures
Il Sorpasso	1962	Italy	
In America	2002	Ireland, United Kingdom, United States	Fox Searchlight Pictures
Interstate 60	2002	United States, Canada	Samuel Goldwyn Films
Into the Night	1985	United States	Universal Pictures
Into the Wild	2007	United States	Paramount Vantage
It Happened One Night	1934	United States	Columbia Pictures
It's a Mad, Mad, Mad, Mad World	1963	United States	United Artists
Kanni Thaai	1965	India	
Karachi se Lahore	2015	Pakistan	IMGC Global Entertainment
Kingpin	1996	United States	Metro-Goldwyn-Mayer
Kings of the Road	1976	West Germany	Axiom Films
Knockin' on Heaven's Door	1997	Germany	Buena Vista International
Kodachrome	2017	United States	Netflix
Kshana Kshanam	1991	India	Durga Arts
Lahore Se Aagey	2016	Pakistan	ARY Films
The Last Detail	1973	United States	Columbia Pictures
Leningrad Cowboys Go America	1989	Finland, Sweden	Finnkino
The Little Bear Movie	2001	Canada, United States	Paramount Home Video
Little Miss Sunshine	2006	United States	Fox Searchlight Pictures
The Living End	1992	United States	Cineplex Odeon Films
Logan	2017	United States	20th Century Fox
Loev	2015	India	Netflix
Looney Tunes: Rabbits Run	2015	United States	Warner Home Video
Lost in America	1985	United States	Warner Bros.
M Cream	2014	India	All Rights Entertainment
Mad Max	1979	Australia	Warner Bros.
Mad Max 2	1981	Australia	Warner Bros.
Mad Max: Fury Road	2015	Australia, United States	Warner Bros.
Made In U.S.A.	1985	United States	Tri-Star Pictures
Madagascar 3: Europe's Most Wanted	2012	United States	Paramount Pictures
Madeline: Lost in Paris	1999	United States	Walt Disney Home Video
Magic Trip	2011	United States	Magnolia Pictures
Midnight Run	1988	United States	Universal Pictures
Midnight Special	2016	United States	Warner Bros. Pictures
The Mitchells vs. the Machines	2021	United States	Netflix
Moana	2016	United States	Walt Disney Animation Studios
Motorama	1991	United States	Two Moon Releasing
The Motorcycle Diaries	2004	Argentina, United States, Chile, Peru, Brazil, United Kingdom, Germany, France	Buena Vista International (ARG); Pathé (UK); Focus Features (USA)
Mourning (aka Soog or Soug, سوگ)	2011	Iran	
The Muppet Movie	1979	United States, United Kingdom	Associated Film Distribution
My Own Private Idaho	1991	United States	Fine Line Features
National Lampoon's European Vacation	1985	United States	Warner Bros.
National Lampoon's Vacation	1983	United States	Warner Bros.
Natural Born Killers	1994	United States	Warner Bros.
Nebraska	2013	United States	Paramount Vantage
Neelakasham Pachakadal Chuvanna Bhoomi	2013	India	E4 Entertainment & PJ Entertainments Europe
O Brother, Where Art Thou?	2000	United States, United Kingdom, France	Buena Vista Pictures Distribution (North America) Universal Pictures (International)
Old Joy	2006	United States	Film Science
Olave Mandara	2011	India	Alliance Picturesv.
On the Road	2012	United States, United Kingdom, France, Brazil, Canada	IFC Films
Onward	2020	United States	Pixar Animation Studios
Paper Moon	1973	United States	Paramount Pictures
Paper Towns	2015	United States	20th Century Fox
The Parade	2011	Serbia	Filmstar
Paris, Texas	1984	West Germany, France	20th Century Fox
Paul	2011	United States	Universal Pictures
Pee-wee's Big Adventure	1985	United States	Warner Bros.
Pee-wee's Big Holiday	2016	United States	Netflix
Pierrot le Fou	1965	France	Société Nouvelle de Cinématographie
Piku	2015	India	Yash Raj Films
Plan B	2021	United States	Hulu
Planes, Trains and Automobiles	1987	United States	Paramount Pictures
Professor Beware	1938	United States	Paramount Pictures
Quiz Lady	2023	United States	Hulu
Rain Man	1988	United States	MGM/UA Communications Company
The Road	2009	United States	Dimension Films
Road, Movie (Hindi: रोड, मूवी)	2009	India	Madman Entertainment; Tribeca Film
Road to Morocco	1942	United States	Paramount Pictures
Road to Yesterday	2015	Nigeria	FilmOne Distribution
Road Trip	2000	United States	DreamWorks Pictures; The Montecito Picture Company
The Road Within	2014	United States	Well Go USA Entertainment
Rock-A-Doodle	1992	United States, United Kingdom, Ireland	The Samuel Goldwyn Company (USA); The Rank Organisation (UK)
The Rover	2014	Australia	Village Roadshow; A24
The Rugrats Movie	1998	United States	Paramount Pictures; Nickelodeon Movies
Rugrats in Paris: The Movie	2000	United States, Germany	Paramount Pictures; Nickelodeon Movies
RV	2006	United States	Columbia Pictures
Sacramento	2024	United States	Vertical
Scarecrow	1973	United States	Warner Bros.
Sideways	2004	United States	Fox Searchlight Pictures
Smoke Signals	1998	United States, Canada	Miramax
Smokey and the Bandit	1977	United States	Universal Pictures
The SpongeBob SquarePants Movie	2004	United States	Paramount Pictures
The SpongeBob Movie: Sponge on the Run	2020	United States	Paramount Pictures
Spike Island	2012	United Kingdom	Revolver Entertainment
Stagecoach	1939	United States	United Artists
Stagecoach	1966	United States	20th Century Fox
The Straight Story	1999	United States, United Kingdom, France	Buena Vista Pictures
The Sugarland Express	1974	United States	Universal Pictures
The Sunchaser	1996	United States	Warner Bros.
The Sure Thing	1985	United States	Embassy Pictures
Taxi Driver: Oko Ashewo	2015	Nigeria	FilmOne Distributions
Thelma & Louise	1991	United States	Metro-Goldwyn-Mayer
These Final Hours	2013	Australia	Roadshow Films
Things Are Tough All Over	1982	United States	Columbia Pictures
Three for the Road	1987	United States	New Century-Vista
To Grandmother's House We Go	1992	United States	Warner Bros. Television
Tommy Boy	1995	United States	Paramount Pictures
Transamerica	2005	United States	The Weinstein Company; IFC Films
Two-Lane Blacktop	1971	United States	Universal Pictures
Uncle Frank	2020	United States	Amazon Studios
Uncle Peckerhead	2020	United States	Epic Pictures Group
The Unknown Country	2022	United States	Music Box Films
Unpregnant	2020	United States	HBO Max
Until the End of the World	1991	Germany, France, Australia, United States	Warner Bros.
Vacation	2015	United States	Warner Bros. Pictures
Vanishing Point	1971	United States	20th Century Fox
We're the Millers	2013	United States	Warner Bros. Pictures
Wild at Heart	1990	United States	The Samuel Goldwyn Company
Wild Hogs	2007	United States	Touchstone Pictures
Wild Strawberries	1957	Sweden	AB Svensk Filmindustri
The Wizard of Oz	1939	United States	Metro-Goldwyn-Mayer
Wolf Creek	2005	Australia	Roadshow Entertainment
Wristcutters: A Love Story	2006	United States	Autonomous Films
Y Tu Mamá También	2001	Mexico	20th Century Fox (Mexico); IFC Films (North America)
Zindagi Na Milegi Dobara	2011	India	Eros International

== See also ==
- Monomyth
