= Karachi Lahore (film series) =

- Directed by: Wajahat Rauf
- Written by: Yasir Hussain
- Story by: Wajahat Rauf
- Produced by: Wajahat Rauf(1,2); Jarjees Seja (2); Salman Iqbal (2); Asfand Farouk (2)
- Starring: Shehzad Sheikh (1); Ayesha Omer (1); Yasir Hussain (1, 2); Javed Sheikh (1); Eshita Syed (1); Saba Qamar (2)
- Cinematography: Rana Kamran (1); Asrad Khan (2)
- Edited by: Hasan Ali Khan (1, 2)
- Music by: Sur Darwaish (1); Shiraz Uppal (2)
- Production company: Showcase Productions (1, 2)
- Distributed by: IMGC Global Entertainment (1); ARY Films (2)
- Release dates: 31 July 2015 (1); 11 November 2016 (2); June 2019 (3)
- Running time: 143 min
- Country: Pakistan
- Language: Urdu

Karachi Lahore is a series of Pakistani road comedy romantic films directed by Wajahat Rauf and written by Yasir Hussain. The first film of the series was released in 2015. Karachi Se Lahore, featured an ensemble cast including Shehzad Sheikh and Ayesha Omer playing lead roles. Whereas Javed Sheikh, Yasir Hussain, Ahmed Ali Akbar, Eshita Syed, Aashir Wajahat, Mantaha Tareen Maqsood and Rasheed Naz all played supporting roles.

In its opening weekend, the film collected Rs. 2 crores at the local box office and at the end of its run, film reached the benchmark of Rs. 10.30 crores. It became the first Pakistani film to be premiered in Hollywood. After the success of the first film the spin-off sequel titled Lahore Se Aagey was released in 2016. With Yasir playing as a lead, alongside Saba Qamar, the film did well at the box office, earning more than Rs. 21 crores at the box office and became the 4th highest-grossing film of 2016. After the success of first two films, director Wajahat Rauf announced that a third film titled, Karachi-Lahore-Karachi would sometime around 2019.

== Plot ==
=== Karachi Se Lahore (2015) ===
Zaheem, the protagonist has been mistreated his entire life by his parents, teachers, bosses and his girlfriend. But when he learns that his longtime girlfriend Ayesha is marrying her cousin in Lahore, he decides to stand up for himself for the first time in his life and go to Lahore to stop the wedding. He gets help from his friends Moti, Sam, his neighbor Mariyam and her little brother, Zeezo. They take Mariyam's dad's Jeep, which is a precious Jeep no one can take. Her dad is going to Islamabad, so he won't know about it. As they all go on the road trip, Zaheem gets closer with Mariyam. They stop to take a break and it turns out they went the wrong way. Zaheem slaps Moti and they argue about it. Later, they reconcile. Some Pashtun people kidnap Sam. Zeezo knows where they went so they go there. In order to take Sam back, Mariyam has to dance in front of everyone. Zaheem falls in love with Mariyam. They finally arrive in Lahore and at Ayesha's wedding. They see Mariyam's dad over there, so they stay away from him. Zaheem sees Ayesha. He goes to her and tells her how much he loves her. Mariyam sees this and runs away crying. Zaheem realizes he loves Mariyam, not Ayesha. He runs after Mariyam and they talk. Zaheem proposes to Mariyam with a Cornetto. She says yes and they celebrate. Mariyam's dad sees the Jeep and he drives it to Zaheem, Mariyam, Sam, Moti and Zeezo. They all see the Jeep and the dad. The film ends with them screaming "Papa".

=== Lahore Se Aagey (2016) ===
Moti from the original film continues his journey from Lahore to Swat where he meets a female rock star Taraa Ahmed.

== Crew ==
Film	Director	Writer(s)	Producer(s)
Karachi Se Lahore (2015)	Wajahat Rauf	Yasir Hussain	Wajahat Rauf
Lahore Se Aagey (2016)	Wajahat Rauf	Yasir Hussain	Wajahat Rauf, Jarjees Seja, Salman Iqbal, Asfand Farouk

== Reception ==
=== Box office ===
Film	Release date	Budget	Box office
Karachi Se Lahore	31 July 2015		Rs10.30 crore(US$1.0 million) (Worldwide)
Lahore Se Aagey	11 November 2016		Rs21.20 crore(US$2.1 million) (Worldwide)
Total			Rs31.5 crore(US$3.1 million)

== See also ==
- List of Pakistani films
- Jawani Phir Nahi Ani (film series)
- Na Maloom Afraad (film series)
