= Ameerika Suvi =

2016 film by Rain Rannu

- Directed by: Rain Rannu
- Produced by: Veljo Otsason; Tõnu Hiielaid
- Starring: Einar Kuusk; Helena Pruuli; Kristo Viiding; Jarmo Murumaa; Wyatt Kelly
- Release date: 9 September 2016
- Running time: 85 minutes
- Country: Estonia
- Languages: Estonian; English

Ameerika Suvi (English: American Summer) is a 2016 Estonian comedy road movie directed by Rain Rannu, starring Einar Kuusk, Kristo Viiding, Helena Risti, Jarmo Murumaa, and Wyatt Kelly. It is inspired by true events.

== Cast ==
- Einar Kuusk as Martin
- Helena Pruuli as Anna
- Kristo Viiding as Norris
- Jarmo Murumaa as Alan
- Wyatt Kelly as Tyler
