= Karachi Se Lahore =

2015 film by Wajahat Rauf

- Theatrical release poster
- Urdu: کراچی سے لاہور
- Directed by: Wajahat Rauf
- Written by: Yasir Hussain
- Story by: Wajahat Rauf
- Produced by: Wajahat Rauf
- Starring: Shahzad Sheikh; Ayesha Omer; Yasir Hussain; Eshita Syed; Jawed Sheikh; Ahmed Ali Akbar
- Cinematography: Rana Kamran
- Edited by: Hasan Ali Khan
- Music by: Sur Darwaish
- Production company: Showcase Productions
- Distributed by: IMGC Global Entertainment
- Release date: 31 July 2015
- Running time: 143 mins
- Country: Pakistan
- Language: Urdu
- Box office: Rs. 1030 million (US$3.7 million)

Karachi Se Lahore (Urdu: کراچی سے لاہور; transl. Karachi to Lahore) is a 2015 Pakistani road-comedy adventure film directed and produced by Wajahat Rauf (in his directorial debut) under the production banner Showcase Films with a story written by Yasir Hussain Karachi Se Lahore features an ensemble cast, including Javed Sheikh, Mantaha Tareen Maqsood, Yasir Hussain, Ahmed Ali Akbar, Eshita Syed, Aashir Wajahat and Rasheed Naz, whereas lead roles are played by Shahzad Sheikh and Ayesha Omer. This is the first Pakistani road-trip film which covers the 36 hours journey from Karachi to Lahore in real time, where the characters face obstacles, overcome them and undergo personal growth.

The film was released by IMGC Global Entertainment in cinemas nationwide on 31 July 2015. In its opening weekend, it took in Rs. 2 crore (US$72,000) at the local box office and at the end of its run, the film reached the benchmark of Rs. 10 crore (US$360,000), becoming a box-office success. It is the first Pakistani film to be premiered in Hollywood.

The film was followed by a spin-off titled Lahore Se Aagey, which was released in 2016.

== Plot ==
The story follows Zaheem, the protagonist, who gets run over by everyone he loves. After his girlfriend notifies Zaheem that she's going to visit Lahore, he decides to let himself go to a party that his friends, Sam and Moti insisted he go to. While at the party, he finds out that his girlfriend is marrying her cousin in Lahore. Frantic and upset, he tries to go to Lahore via Karachi Jinnah International Airport, but finds out on the news that the Pakistan Authority of Civil Aviation has banned all flights from Karachi International due to workers on strike. He begs his neighbors (Mariyam and Zeezo), to use their Jeep but they decline at first. When they reluctantly allow (although Maryiam's father cherishes the Jeep and lets no one use it) they start. They stop at a hotel for the night, but the receptionist asks for a marriage certificate and unneeded stuff. But a Sindhi Landlord and his goons come and scold the receptionist for letting his daughter sleep with a random man, and forces the receptionist to give Zaheem a room. After proposing to Maryiam with a Cornetto, the team decide to eat breakfast while Moti goes to the toilet. He meets a Pashtun man where he accidentally punches and runs off after the man scared him. They drive away and Moti says he knows a short cut. The map was wrong, but Zaheem doesn't know. After Zaheem wakes up, he finds out that they aren't in Lahore and punches Moti. Moti gets upset and Mariyam scolds Zaheem. After everything is solved, they drive again and Zeezo demands to drive the car or else he would snitch. Zeezo crashes the car, so the team make a car pull over and help them. In that car was none other than the Pashtun man. In exchange for listening for fixing their car, Zaheem must listen to his story. But the Pashtun man demands another favor and asks to take Sam for a day. After getting back Sam, they drive to Lahore where they get into the wedding. Maryiam sees her dad at the wedding, having a drink with a woman named Khushi, while drinking alcohol. (Maryiams mom had died and in Muslim culture alcohol is prohibited). Zaheem confesses his love for his girlfriend, and preaches his love for her, until stopping mid-way and finding out that he really loves Maryiam. The movie ends with Zaheem proposing to Maryiam and her accepting, but Maryiams father catches them.

== Cast ==
- Shahzad Sheikh as Zaheem
- Ayesha Omer as Maryam
- Ahmed Ali Akbar as Sam
- Aashir Wajahat as Zeezo
- Yasir Hussain as Mutazalzal a.k.a. Moti
- Jawed Sheikh as Tiwana
- Eshita Syed as Ayesha (Aashi)
- Mantaha Tareen Maqsood as Khushi
- Rasheed Naz as Khan Sahib
- Muzna Ibrahim as a lady in the bank (special appearance)
- Wajahat Rauf as Sindhi Landlord (special appearance)
- Hashim Butt as Malik Sahib (Drunk Man)
- Noor ul Hassan as policeman
- Sumbul Ansari as Zaheem's mother (Special appearance)

== Production ==
=== Marketing ===
First poster of film was revealed on 13 January 2015. The first look teaser of an item song featuring Ayesha Omer released on 21 March. First look teaser trailer along with poster was revealed in a press conference held in Karachi. Theatrical poster featuring film sponsors with release date was revealed on 30 April 2015. Character poster featuring Yasir Hussain was revealed on 30 June. More character posters were also revealed later in same month. On 17 July a video song titled Aja Re Aja was released on Vimeo. Digital marketing and PR for the film is being handled by SocialSell, the official digital partners for the film. The soundtrack of this movie was also released in India under the label of Sony Music (India).

== Release ==
Karachi se Lahore was released nationwide in over 60 screens on 31 July 2015. The film was premiered in Hollywood, Los Angeles on 16 August. The world television premiere of film was shown on Urdu 1 on 25 September 2015 (Eid 1st Day). It was set to be released in the USA on 27 November 2015.

=== Critical reception ===
Rafay Mahmood of The Express Tribune rated the film 2.5 out of 5 stars and given the verdict as "Karachi Se Lahore has hilarious moments that at times seem out of place. Watch the film to learn some new jokes, but opt out if you are looking for a good big screen experience."

== Spin-off ==
In November 2015, director Wajahat Rauf announced that there will be a spin-off film of Karachi Se Lahore, scheduled to be released in 2016. He said: "This will be more of a romantic-comedy and will follow the adventures of a young couple. It is set right after the events of Karachi Se Lahore."

The film was titled Lahore Se Aagey, and starred Saba Qamar and Yasir Hussain in starring roles alongside Rubina Ashraf, Behroze Sabzwari and Atiqa Odho. It was released on 11 November 2016 to poor critical response.

== Accolades ==
Category	Recipient	Result
Lux Style Award for Best Male Playback in a Film	Ali Noor and Hamza Ali for Baysabar	Nominated
Lux Style Award for Best Female Playback in a Film	Zarish for Rabi Reli	Nominated
Lux Style Award for Best Supporting Actor in a Film	Yasir Hussain	Nominated

== See also ==
- List of directorial debuts
- List of Pakistani films of 2015
- List of highest grossing Pakistani films
- Karachi Lahore (film series)
