= Fantasy Filmfest =

Annual genre film festival in Germany

- Location: Berlin; Hamburg; Munich; Cologne; Frankfurt; Stuttgart; Nuremberg
- Established: 1987
- Awards: Fresh Blood Award
- Hosted by: Rosebud
- No. of films: 50
- Language: German; English
- Website: fantasyfilmfest.com/en/

The Fantasy Filmfest (FFF), is an international genre film festival held annually around September in major German cities.

== Awards ==
=== Fresh Blood Award ===
In 2006, the festival introduced the Fresh Blood Award, an audience award presented to the best first or second feature film by a director.

Winners:

- 2006: Brick
- 2007: Ex Drummer
- 2008: JCVD
- 2009: District 9
- 2010: Four Lions
- 2011: Hell
- 2012: Beasts of the Southern Wild
- 2013: Blancanieves
- 2014: Housebound
- 2015: Shrew's Nest
- 2016: Under the Shadow
- 2017: I Remember You
- 2018: Heavy Trip
- 2019: Hotel Mumbai
- 2020: Not awarded
- 2021: Beyond the Infinite Two Minutes
- 2022: Freaks Out
- 2023: Mars Express
- 2024: Humanist Vampire Seeking Consenting Suicidal Person
- 2025: Slanted

== See also ==
- List of fantastic and horror film festivals
