= Lahore Se Aagey =

2016 film by Wajahat Rauf

- Theatrical release poster
- Urdu: لاہور سے آگے
- Directed by: Wajahat Rauf
- Written by: Yasir Hussain
- Story by: Wajahat Rauf; Yasir Hussain
- Produced by: Wajahat Rauf; Jarjees Seja; Salman Iqbal; Asfand Farouk
- Starring: Yasir Hussain; Saba Qamar
- Cinematography: Asrad Khan
- Edited by: Hasan Ali Khan
- Music by: Shiraz Uppal
- Production company: Showcase Films
- Distributed by: ARY Films; 20th Century Fox
- Release date: 11 November 2016 (Worldwide)
- Running time: 131 min
- Country: Pakistan
- Language: Urdu
- Box office: Rs. 216 million (US$770,000)

Lahore Se Aagey (Urdu: لاہور سے آگے; transl. Beyond Lahore) is a 2016 Pakistani road-comedy romantic film directed by Wajahat Rauf, written by Yasir Hussain and produced by Wajahat Rauf, Asfand Faruok, Salman Iqbal, and Jarjees Seja. The film is a spin-off of the 2015 comedy film Karachi Se Lahore and the second installment in the Karachi Lahore film series. It features an all star cast, including Hussain (who was also part of the original film) along with Saba Qamar, Behroze Sabzwari, Abdullah Farhatullah, Mubashir Malik, Atiqa Odho, Rubina Ashraf and Noor ul Hasan. The film was released worldwide on 11 November 2016 under the production banner of Showcase Films. Upon release, it received criticism from critics and became a moderate box office success.

== Plot ==
Moti from the original film continues his journey from Lahore to Swat where he meets a female rock star Taraa Ahmed.

== Cast ==
- Yasir Hussain as Mutazalzal a.k.a. Moti
- Saba Qamar as Taraa Ahmed
- Rubina Ashraf as Nusrat (Mumani)
- Behroze Sabzwari as M.Mughal (Mamu)
- Aashir Wajahat as Zeezo
- Abdullah Farhatullah as Boss
- Noor ul Hassan as Balla
- Omer Sultan as AB
- Atiqa Odho as Shama Rani
- Yasir Taj as Baba
- Frieha Altaf as herself
- Asad Siddiqui as a Pan seller (cameo appearance)
- Ali Zafar as himself (special appearance)
- Shiraz Uppal as Judge (special appearance)
- Komal Rizvi as Judge (special appearance)
- Goher Mumtaz as Judge (special appearance)
- Iftikhar Thakur as a hair dresser (special appearance)

== Production ==
According to the director Wajahat Rauf, after the release of Karachi Se Lahore, Yasir Hussain received public recognition and became popular for his role of "Moti" so he decided to make its sequel. Rauf said: "Following the release of Karachi Se Lahore, Moti became a tremendous hit amongst the audiences, so Yasir and I decided to make a separate film starring just him." The film is written by Yasir Hussain and he will play the lead role with Saba Qamar. Yasir Hussain has told in an interview that the cast from Karachi Se Lahore will also make cameo appearances. The film is shot in Karachi, Lahore and the northern parts of Pakistan. The cast also includes Rubina Ashraf and Behroze Sabzwari in pivotal roles whereas Saba Qamar played the role of an upcoming rockstar. First look of the film was revealed on 20 February 2016.

== Soundtrack ==
The first song of the film "Kalabaaz Dil" was released on 24 September 2016 by ARY Films. Second song of the film "Zara Si Laga Lo" was released on 15 October 2016. Full album was released on 24 October 2016.

All lyrics are written by Shakeel Sohail; all music is composed by Shiraz Uppal.

No.	Title	Singer(s)	Length
1.	"Kalabaaz Dil"	Aima Baig, Jabar Abbas	4:57
2.	"Zara Si Laga Lo"	Shiraz Uppal	4:01
3.	"Be Fiqriyan"	Aima Baig	4:16
4.	"Tere Bina"	Aashir Wajahat	4:25
5.	"Ehle Dil"	Aima Baig	4:41
Total length:			22:20

== Release ==
A teaser for the film was released online on 8 August 2016. An official trailer for the film was released online on 9 September 2016. The film was first premiered in Lahore, and then in Karachi on 9 and 10 November 2016 respectively. It then released on 11 November nationwide.

=== Box office ===
The film collected up to Rs. 216.0 million worldwide and became the fourth highest-grossing film of 2016.

== Critical reception ==
Sarah Raza Ansari of Samaa TV rated 5/10 and said, "The whole story wraps off in this way on a good note." She added, "The plot could have been improved with a little effort." Asfia Afzal of Business Recorder also said for the improvement of plot.

Rafay Mahmood of The Express Tribune said, "The film itself is nothing more than an extended chase sequence. The shots are neat and well-framed but aren't grand enough to explore the natural beauty, a cardinal sin when treating any road movie." Gibran Khalil of DAWN said, "Instead of embodying the spirit of a road trip film by evoking a smooth sense of movement, Lahore Se Aagey feels more like a collection of short sketches. I'll admit that it looks like the LSA team had a ball making the movie." Both critics rated the film 2/5.

Shubham Bahukhandi of Dekh News rated 3.5/5 and praised its direction, while said that it has the worst screenplay ever and its music is not even average.

== Accolades ==
Ceremony	Won	Nominated
16th Lux Style Awards	Aima Baig – Best Female Singer for "Kalabaz Dil"	Anjum Shehzad – Best Director; Yasir Hussain – Best Actor; Saba Qamar – Best Actress
3rd Galaxy Lollywood Awards	Aima Baig – Best Playback Singer Female for "Kalabaz Dil"	Wajahat Rauf and Salman Iqbal – Best Film; Yasir Hussain – Best Actor in a Leading Role Male; Saba Qamar – Best Actor in a Leading Role Female; Wajahat Rauf – Best Director; Abdullah Farhatullah – Best Actor in a Comic Role; Shiraz Uppal – Best Music; Kalabaz Dil – Song of the Year; Wahab Shah – Best Choreography for Kalabaz Dil; Saba Qamar and Yasir Hussain – Best Dance Performance for Kalabaz Dil; Saba Qamar and Yasir Hussain – Best On Screen Couple; Ddance off in jungle – Cinematic Moment of the Year
1st International Pakistan Prestige Awards		Wajahat Rauf and Salman Iqbal – Best Film; Wwajahat Rauf – Best Director; Yasir Hussain – Best Actor Film; Saba Qamar – Best Actress Film; Aima Baig – Best Singer Male/Female for "Kalabaz Dil"; Behroze Sabzwari – Best Actor in a Supporting Role Male/Female

== Sequel ==
After the success of first two films, director Wajahat Rauf also announced a third film in the installment in August 2018.

== See also ==
- Karachi Lahore (film series)
- List of Pakistani films
- List of Pakistani films of 2016
- Aima Baig discography
