= Mors Subita =

Finnish melodic death metal band

- Origin: Haukipudas, Finland
- Genre: Melodic Death Metal
- Years active: 1999–present
- Members: Mika Lammassaari; Mika ”June” Junttila; Ville Miinala; Eemeli Bodde; Juho Näppä
- Past members: Juha Haapala; Aki Lammassaari; Jarno "Jarski" Rankinen; Jukka-Pekka Ellilä; Antti ”Hape” Haapsamo; Jarkko Kaleva; Tero Piltonen
- Website: morssubita.com

Mors Subita (Latin: Sudden Death) is a melodic death metal band from Finland. It has released four studio albums, including the first Human Waste Compression in 2011. The band's music has been said to be influenced by Carcass, At the Gates, Arch Enemy and others.

== Biography ==
=== Establishment ===
Mors Subita was founded in Haukipudas in 1999, when guitarist cousins Mika and Aki Lammassaari and drummer Juha Haapala started playing covers of Pantera, White Zombie, Metallica and Sentenced, among others. In 1999-2000, the band went under the name Zilstrone recorded a demo of their own songs. After that, the band changed their style to a more aggressive one and went through some member changes.

The first demo Synopsis was released in 2003 under the name Mors Subita. The band consisted of Mika Lammassaari (guitar), Juha Haapala (drums), Jarno "Jarski" Rankinen (bass), Antti "Hape" Haapsamo (vocals) and Jarkko Kaleva (guitar). According to Lammassaari, the name Mors Subita was created in a "finger in the dictionary" style, and the members were sufficiently intrigued by this translation. The finger hit the medical dictionary in this case.

During the 2000s, the band released three more self-published memos or EPs.

=== Debut album Human Waste Compression (2011) ===
Mors Subita released their debut album Human Waste Compression in summer 2011 via Violent Journey Records. The members of the first demo were guitarist-composer-songwriter Lammassaari, singer Haapsamo and drummer Haapala. Bass was played by Mika "June" Junttila, and at the end of the recordings the band was joined by another guitarist, Tero Piltonen. A music video was filmed for the song "The Sermon". The album reached number 42 in the official Finnish album charts.

Shortly after the release of the debut album, Haapala left the band and was replaced by Ville Miinala (Vortech, Thyrane). In the spring of 2013, Piltonen announced that he was leaving the band to focus on other projects (including his band Dark Flood), and a few weeks later Haapsamo announced his own departure and farewell concert, which took place at Oulu's Club Teatria on 26 April 2013, opening for Ensiferum. Haapsamo was replaced by Eemeli Bodde (Funeral for the Masses).

=== Degeneration (2015) ===
The second album, Degeneration, was released in March 2015. The album was recorded at Tico Tico Studio in Kemi and Lammassaari's home studio, mixed by Aksu Hanttu and mastered by Svante Forsbäck. The album brought with it changes to the band's songwriting, with responsibility for lyrics and song arrangements shifting from Lammassaari to new singer Bodde. After Violent Journey's demise, Degeneration was produced by Tuomas Saukkonen in his One Man Army/One Man Metal Factory guise. Lammassaari also played in Saukkonen's band Wolfheart at the time. The album reached number 26 on the Finnish album charts. At festivals, Mors Subita performed at Nummirock and Tuska, and opened for Sepultura at Nosturi. In 2015 and 2016, the band performed at Oulu Jalometall.

=== Into the Pitch Black (2018) ===
The third album, Into the Pitch Black, was released on Inverse Records on April 6, 2018. The band had no personnel changes since the previous album, and said the album was a more cohesive and stronger whole than before. Like its predecessor, the album was recorded at Tico Tico Studio and Lammassaari's own studio with Ahti Kortelainen, and mixed and mastered by Stefan Pommerin of Illusia Productions. Into the Pitch Black reached number 11 in the official Finnish album charts, and number 3 in the physical album sales charts. The album's singles were released and made the list of Finland's 50 most viral songs, and the reviews were praising.

Lammassaari and Bodde were involved in the soundtrack of the comedy film Hevi reissu, which premiered in 2018, for which the former composed the music. The film was directed by Jukka Vidgren and Juuso Laatio, who have collaborated with Mors Subita since the music video for their debut album "The Sermon".

=== Extinction Era (2020) ===
Mors Subita signed a record deal with German label Out of Line Music in the spring of 2019, with the label releasing the first three albums on the Human Waste Compression box set later that year.

The band's fourth studio album Extinction Era was released on 30 October 2020.

On October 12, 2024, the band announced on social media that Eemeli Bodde was going to depart after the ongoing Trigger Wars tour. They further stated there was no drama or ill will between the members and that they would remain friends. Eemeli Bodde was previously announced as the new vocalist of Decapitated on October 10, 2024.

== Personnel ==
=== Members ===
Current lineup

- Mika Lammassaari – backing vocals, guitars (1999–present)
- Mika ”June” Junttila – bass (2005–present)
- Ville Miinala – drums (2012–present)
- Juho Näppä – guitar (2018–present)

Former members

- Juha Haapala – drums (1999–2011)
- Aki Lammassaari– guitars (1999–2000)
- Jarno "Jarski" Rankinen – bass (2000–2005)
- Jukka-Pekka Ellilä – guitars (2000–2002)
- Antti ”Hape” Haapsamo – vocals (2002–2013)
- Jarkko Kaleva – guitars (2002-2011)
- Tero Piltonen – guitars (2011-2013)
- Eemeli Bodde – vocals (2014–2024)

== Discography ==
=== Studio albums ===
- Human Waste Compression (2011)
- Degeneration (2015)
- Into the Pitch Black (2018)
- Extinction Era (2020)
- Origin of Fire (2023)
