= Rune Temte =

Norwegian actor (born 1965)

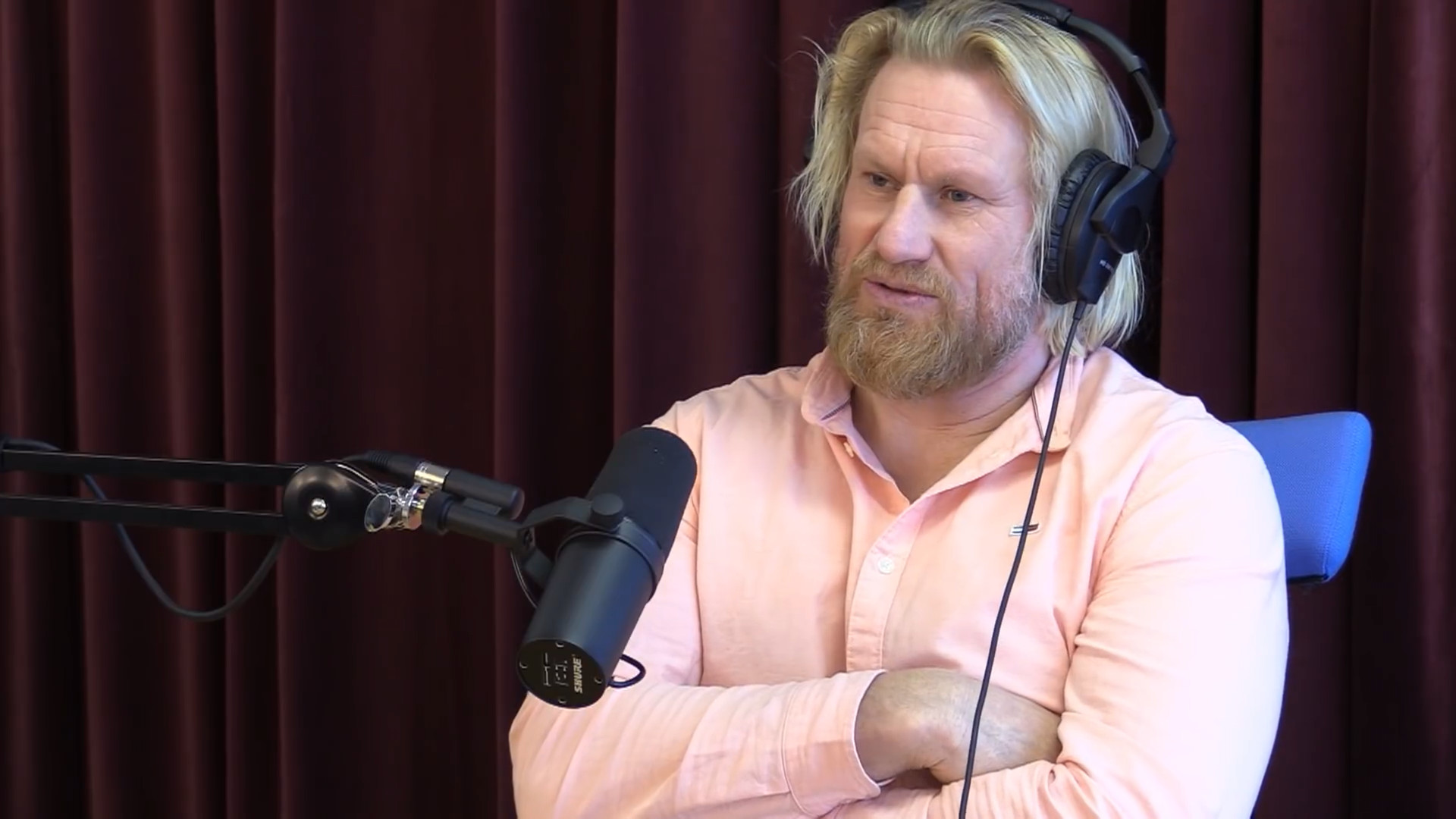
- Temte at a podcast in 2021
- Born: 29 September 1965 (age 60); Solbergelva, Nedre Eiker, Norway
- Citizenship: Norwegian
- Occupations: Actor, producer
- Years active: 1993–present
- Spouse: Thea Glimsdal Temte
- Children: 1

Rune Temte (born 29 September 1965) is a Norwegian actor best known for his roles in The Last Kingdom and Eddie the Eagle. He portrayed Bron-Char in the Marvel Studios superhero film Captain Marvel in 2019.

== Early life and sporting career ==
Born and raised in Solbergelva on the outskirts of Oslo, Temte began playing football aged 7, achieving his first professional contract aged 18. Temte played for Strømsgodset, playing for the team across five seasons and was awarded player of the year in 1988.

After five years with Strømsgodset, Temte took the decision to quit the sport to pursue his first love of acting, while also studying economics. Temte trained at the Drama Studio London, in 1993–1994. He continued to play football throughout his training for Tooting and Mitcham United F.C.

Temte was also active in the sport of bandy, playing for the club Solberg SK and the under-19 Norway national bandy team. In the 1984 Bandy World Championship Y-19 in Vänersborg, Sweden, Temte played as a midfielder when the Norwegian team won the bronze medal.

== Acting career ==
Temte founded his own production company, Temte Productions, in 1991 and has produced more than 20 theatre productions, one feature film, and three short films. He is also a stage actor.

== Personal life ==
Temte is fluent in English, Swedish and Norwegian. He is married to fashion designer Thea Glimsdal Temte, and they have one son. He tweeted his support for his favourite team Leeds United on Twitter following the teams's promotion to the Premier League on 20 July 2020

== Credits ==
=== Television ===
Year	Title	Role	Company	Notes
1995	One for the Road	Ola	Altman International / Channel X	
1998	Nini	Bent	NRK Drama / SVT	
2004	Skolen	Elektriker	NRK	
2005	Deadline Torp	NK	NRK Drama	TV movie
2006	Jul i svingen	Faren til Børre	KRO Youth / NRK	
2008	The Inspector and the Sea	Ingmar	Network Movie	
2014	TRIO: Odins Gull	Vinstra Coach	NRK TV	
2014	Tatort	Kaltstart	Das Erste	
2014	Lilyhammer	Handyman	Rubicon TV / Renegade TV	
2015	Hotel Cæsar	Karl Ramstad	TV 2	
2015	The Last Kingdom	Ubba	Carnival Films / BBC Two	
2016	Fortitude	Lars Ulvinaune	Sky Atlantic	
2020	Rig 45	Aksel	Viaplay	
2020, 2022	The Machinery	Magnus Helgesen	Viaplay	
2024	Time Bandits	Bittelig	Apple TV+	Upcoming miniseries

=== Film ===
Year	Title	Role	Company	Notes
1996	Wives 3	Police	Magdalenafilm A/S / Norsk Film	
1997	Mendel	Fireman	Norsk Film / Northern Lights A/S	
1998	Markus og Diana	Florian Simps	Norsk Film / Northern Lights A/S	
2002	Klippan i livet	Halvard	Monster Film	Short Film
2002	Fia og klovnene	Torgeir	Dinamo Story	
2005	Love Me Tomorrow	Kungen	Maipo Film	
2007	Switch	Supporting	Film Fund FUZZ	
2009	Ulykken	Jonas	Fender Film	
2012	Johan Falk: Organizatsija Karayan	Byggledare Piotr	Strix Drama	
2014	Sludd	Colleague	Dir. and Written by Qaiser Shar	Short Film
2016	Eddie the Eagle	Bjørn the Norwegian Coach	20th Century Fox / Lionsgate	
2018	Hevi reissu	Frank	Umedia	
2019	Captain Marvel	Bron-Char	Marvel Studios	
2021	A Boy Called Christmas	Anders	Netflix	
2022	Arctic Void	Jim	Level 33 Entertainment	

== Norwegian Dubbing ==
=== Film ===
Year	Title	Role	Company
1991	Beauty Beast	Beast	Walt Disney Animation Studios
1998	A Bug's Life	Francis	Pixar Animation Studios
1998	Mulan	Yao	Walt Disney Animation Studios
2003	Brother Bear	Tug	Walt Disney Animation Studios
2004	Home on the Range	Alameda Slim/Willie Brothers	Walt Disney Animation Studios
2004	Mulan II	Yao	Disneytoon Studios
2006	Brother Bear 2	Tug	Disneytoon Studios
2017	Beauty Beast	Beast	Walt Disney Pictures
