= Heavier Trip =

- Directed by: Juuso Laatio; Jukka Vidgren
- Written by: Juuso Laatio; Jukka Vidgren
- Produced by: Kaarle Aho; Kai Nordberg; Jukka Vidgren
- Starring: Johannes Holopainen; Samuli Jaskio; Max Ovaska; Chike Ohanwe; Anatole Taubman
- Edited by: Kimmo Taavila
- Music by: Mika Lammassaari; Year of the Goat
- Production companies: Heimathafen Film; Making Movies; Mutant Koala Pictures
- Distributed by: Nelonen Media
- Release date: 2024
- Running time: 96 minutes
- Country: Finland
- Languages: Finnish; English; Norwegian; German
- Box office: $521,272

Heavier Trip is a Finnish comedy film directed by Juuso Laatio and Jukka Vidgren. It is a sequel to the 2018 film Heavy Trip, marking the return of the film's fictional heavy metal band Impaled Rektum.

== Plot ==
After the events of the first film, Finnish extreme metal band Impaled Rektum - consisting of singer Turo, guitarist Lotvonen, bassist Xytrax and drummer Oula - are incarcerated in a Norwegian prison. They are visited by music producer Maxwell Efraim Fisto, who finds the band's supposed volatility exciting, and offers the band a slot at the Wacken Open Air festival and €50.000; while the band is interested, Xytrax reflexively says no, as he considers Wacken too commercial, and Fisto walks away with the offer.

Back in Finland, Lotvonen's father Pekka has a heart attack when he finds out that he needs to invest €30,000 in the family slaughterhouse, lest it be bulldozed; upon hearing the news, the band breaks out of prison, travels home, and contacts Fisto; Fisto says the Wacken slot has been filled, but offers the band a chance to prove themselves at a gig in Vilnius. When Norwegian security officer Dokken (Note: Dokken appeared in Heavy Trip as a border patrol officer.) pursues the band to the Lotvonen farm, they steal her car and travel to Helsinki, and stow away on the tour bus of Bloodmotor, another band managed by Fisto. Arriving in Vilnius, Fisto welcomes them and offers them the opening slot in front of Bloodmotor, but insists they play cover songs - Xytrax protests, and Fisto walks away again, lamenting that the band never takes their chances. When during the gig, Bloodmotor's singer Rob is dragged off stage by fans, Turo climbs on stage and takes over, finishing the song; backstage, Turo makes a deal with an impressed Fisto to do anything to be successful, and Fisto gives a slot to the band at Wacken.

Before the festival, Fisto puts the band through an aesthetic makeover: The resulting poster focuses on Turo, who Fisto dubs "Turo Starshine", with little emphasis on the other members. The band records a brutal death metal single they call "Prisoner of Flesh", but in absence of the band, Fisto and his studio engineer turn the song into a modern melodic deathcore track with electronic elements, re-titling it "To Die For"; when Turo finds out and expresses his distaste, Fisto offers him a choice between walking away with the promised €50,000, or playing Wacken. When the band is shown the final song, Xytrax, upon hearing it, quits the band and is arrested by Dokken. After a tour bus mishap on the way to Wacken, Turo, Lotvonen and Oula steal a hearse to reach Wacken, but Turo's growing ego triggers Oula's anger issues; when Turo belittles Oula's contributions, Oula quits the band and is also arrested by Dokken.

Turo and Lotvonen arrive to Wacken and meet Fisto: Fisto reveals to Lotvonen that Turo refused the money to be able to play the concert, and has an enraged Lotvonen dragged away by security. Turo then takes the Wacken stage with session musicians, but sees Lotvonen being arrested by Dokken, and walks off stage despite Fisto's threats. He climbs a festival tower and jumps off using his stage prop wings to land on Dokken's car, breaking out the rest of the band - he apologizes to his friends, but when he proposes to still earn the money to help the farm, the rest of the band walks away disillusioned. They resort to collecting beer cans at the festival to earn the money, but notice Turo performing death metal acappella to also earn money; realizing he means well, they borrow some gear from Babymetal - who Xytrax bonded with over underground extreme metal - but as they're about to start playing a fundraiser for the festival crowd to earn money, an unhinged Dokken tries to shoot Turo with a gun handed to her by Fisto. Lotvonen jumps in front of Turo and takes the bullet to the head, but survives effectively unscathed as the bullet "didn't hit anything important". Fisto is then confronted by Bloodmotor, and Rob melts his face off with an extremely low death growl.

In the epilogue, Impaled Rektum is re-incarcerated, but is allowed to play metal shows in prison, which causes the prison's population to soar, and Lotvonen's dad is shown using Bloodmotor's golden toilet.

== Cast ==
- Johannes Holopainen as Turo Moilanen
- Max Ovaska as Pasi / Xytrax
- Samuli Jaskio as Lotvonen
- Chike Ohanwe as Oula
- David Bredin as Rob
- Anatole Taubman as Fisto

Japanese kawaii metal band Babymetal make a cameo appearance.

== Production ==
Heavier Trip was announced in 2023 as a sequel to the 2018 film Heavy Trip. The film is again directed by Juuso Laatio and Jukka Vidgren who helmed the original in their first feature film. It is produced by Making Movies and was in post-production by February 2024.

== Release ==
The film had a world premiere at Fantastic Fest in Austin, Texas in October 2024 and a European premiere the following week at Filmfest Hamburg.

Doppelgänger Releasing acquired North American distribution rights to the film in August 2024 with a theatrical and home entertainment release scheduled for November later that year. Heavier Trip was eventually released in North America on November 29, 2024.
