= Heavy Trip =

2018 Finnish comedy film

- Directed by: Juuso Laatio; Jukka Vidgren
- Written by: Juuso Laatio; Aleksi Puranen; Jari Olavi Rantala; Jukka Vidgren
- Produced by: Kaarle Aho; Kai Nordberg
- Starring: Johannes Holopainen; Samuli Jaskio; Max Ovaska; Antti Heikkinen; Minka Kuustonen; Ville Tiihonen; Chike Ohanwe; Rune Temte
- Edited by: Kimmo Taavila
- Music by: Lauri Porra
- Production companies: Making Movies; FilmCamp; Umedia; Mutant Koala Pictures
- Distributed by: Ascot Elite Entertainment Group; Doppelganger Releasing; Finnkino; Sparky Pictures; Universal Sony Pictures Home Entertainment Nordic
- Release date: March 9, 2018
- Countries: Finland; Belgium; Norway
- Languages: Finnish; Norwegian; English
- Budget: €3 million

Heavy Trip (Finnish: Hevi reissu, Swedish: En heavy resa) is a Finnish comedy film released in 2018, directed by first-time directors Jukka Vidgren and Juuso Laatio. The comedy tells the story of a small-town heavy metal band's journey to their dream gig in Norway. The movie satirizes heavy metal tropes (a la Metalocalypse and This Is Spinal Tap), with a focus on those relevant to the Finnish and Scandinavian metal scene.

Heavy Trip was first released in Finland on 9 March 2018, followed the very next day by screenings in the South by Southwest festival in Austin, Texas, garnering mixed to positive reception from audiences and critics.

The original songs performed in the movie by the band "Impaled Rektum" were composed by Mika Lammassaari, the guitarist of Mors Subita. Eemeli Bodde of Mors Subita provides the vocals for these songs. The rest of the movie's soundtrack was composed by Lauri Porra.

The sequel to the film, Heavier Trip, was released in theaters in the fall of 2024.

== Plot ==
Turo Moilanen lives in a small village in Northern Finland, working in a psychiatric hospital and fronting an extreme metal (Note: In a running joke, the band describes their style as "symphonic post-apocalyptic reindeer-grinding Christ-abusing extreme war pagan fennoscandian metal".) band: the band - rounded out by drummer Jynkky, bassist Pasi, and guitarist Lotvonen - has ambitions, but they can't agree on a name, Turo's stage fright keeps them from touring, and Pasi regularly points out that Lotvonen's riffs are lifted from other songs. Turo also develops a crush on Miia, daughter of the police commissioner Kujanpää, but is warned off by local crooner Jouni who also has sights on her.

The band experiences a breakthrough when a reindeer carcass in the Lotvonen slaughterhouse gets stuck in an industrial meat grinder, and the sound inspires the band to write and their first original song, "Flooding Secretions", and name themselves "Impaled Rektum". When Norwegian promoter Frank Massegrav visits the farm to buy reindeer blood as a prop for an upcoming festival - and gets doused by it by accident - an enthusiastic Jynkky gives him the demo tape, and convinces the others that this will allow them to play at the festival. Turo lies to Miia that they got the gig, and she quickly spreads the news in town, changing the band's standing from outcasts to the talk of the town, which the band doubles down on.

The band is invited to play at the local event hall on the back of their sudden popularity, but their luck quickly turns: Frank calls them to say they won't get a slot at the festival, and Turo's performance anxiety causes him to vomit on the front row as they're about to start playing; Jouni, who overheard the phone call, tells the audience the truth, which turns the town on the band again. Desperate, Jynkky refuses to give up and buys a dilapidated van to drive to the festival anyway, but swerves off the road and dies in the car crash.

After the funeral, the band is devastated and goes their separate ways, until Miia visits Turo and chides him for giving up; Turo, determined, steals Jouni's recreational vehicle, picks up Pasi and Lotvonen, and breaks out mental patient Oula, who's been inspired by Turo to pick up metal drumming as a means of coping with his intermittent explosive disorder; the band also exhumes Jynkky's coffin, promising him that he will be on the festival stage, alive or dead.

When news of the runaway band spreads, Norwegian authorities are notified, but when the band's van is described to carry terrorists, the border guard confuses them with a van carrying a bachelor party whose members are dressed up in thawb and attacks them instead while the band sneaks past them. Authorities eventually catch up to the band and corner them at the edge of a cliff; the band, desperate to get to the festival, jump off with the coffin, and eventually wash up ashore to meet a group of live action role-players who ferry them to the festival on a Viking longship.

As they arrive to the festival, Frank expresses his respect for the "metal" actions the band has committed to get there, and grants them a slot for one song on stage; Miia also arrives, and they confess their mutual feelings to each other with Turo. On stage, anxiety gets the better of Turo again and he vomits on the front row again, but composes himself and leads the band into a triumphant performance, with Jynkky's coffin crowdsurfing. The band is immediately arrested afterwards, but Turo admits he has no regrets, and that the world will hear of his band again.

== Cast ==
- Johannes Holopainen as Turo Moilanen
- Antti Tuomas Heikkinen as Jyrki Kalevi 'Jynkky' Pätsi
- Minka Kuustonen as Miia
- Max Ovaska as Pasi / Xytrax
- Samuli Jaskio as Lotvonen
- Ville Tiihonen as Jouni Tulkku
- Chike Ohanwe as Oula
- Pirjo Lonka as Pirjo
- Sinikka Mokkila as Mama Lotvonen
- Martti Syrjä as Papa Lotvonen
- Pertti Sveholm as Bæjarstjórinn
- Rune Temte as Frank Massegrav
- Torstein Bjørklund as Christensen
- Helén Vikstvedt as Anette Dokken

== Production ==
Jukka Vidgren and Juuso Laatio met and began their collaboration while attending film school. They initially worked together on a school project—a mockumentary-style short film about a heavy metal band named Impaled Rektum. Initially planning a large-scale post-apocalyptic sci-fi project, they found it too ambitious and opted to expand their earlier school project instead. This decision was made in November 2011, and five years later, their film was completed. The directors aimed to blend lighthearted comedy with the edgy and modern aspects of heavy metal, drawing inspiration from various sources including This is Spinal Tap, The Blues Brothers, and The Simpsons.

=== Soundtrack ===
The soundtrack of the film features contributions from several notable musicians in the Finnish metal scene. Lauri Porra of Stratovarius wrote most of the original soundtrack. Key tracks performed by the fictional band "Impaled Rektum" were composed by Mika Lammassaari and Eemeli Bodde from the Finnish melodic death metal band Mors Subita, who have collaborated with the directors since the music video for their debut album The Sermon. Bands Mokoma and Diablo also made significant contributions.

== Reception ==
Since its release, the film has become a cult-classic among fans and the heavy metal community. It currently holds a score of 94% on Rotten Tomatoes.

== Accolades ==
Year	Film Festival / Competition	Category	Results
	Fantasia Film Festival	Fresh Blood Award	Won
2018	Fantasy Filmfest	Audience Award	Won
2018	Miskolc International Film Festival	Audience Award	Won
2018	Miskolc International Film Festival	Emeric Pressburger Prize	Nominated
2018	Noordelijk Film Festival	Audience Award	Won
2018	Ostend Film Festival / Taste of Europe	Best Film	Won
2018	Warsaw International Film Festival	Free Spirit Award	Won
2019	Belfast Film Festival	Audience Award	Won
2019	Jussi Awards	Best Makeup Design	Nominated
2019	Jussi Awards	Audience Award	Nominated

== Sequel ==
After the international success of Heavy Trip, Laatio expressed that a sequel was "in the works" in a June 2022 interview with Metal Hammer. The sequel to the film, titled Heavier Trip, was officially announced on social media on 28 August 2023. Filming of Heavier Trip wrapped on 15 September 2023. The film's first trailer was released on 9 August 2024.
