= Matthias Lilienthal =

German dramaturge and theatre director

Matthias Lilienthal (born 21 December 1959) is a German dramaturge and theatre director.

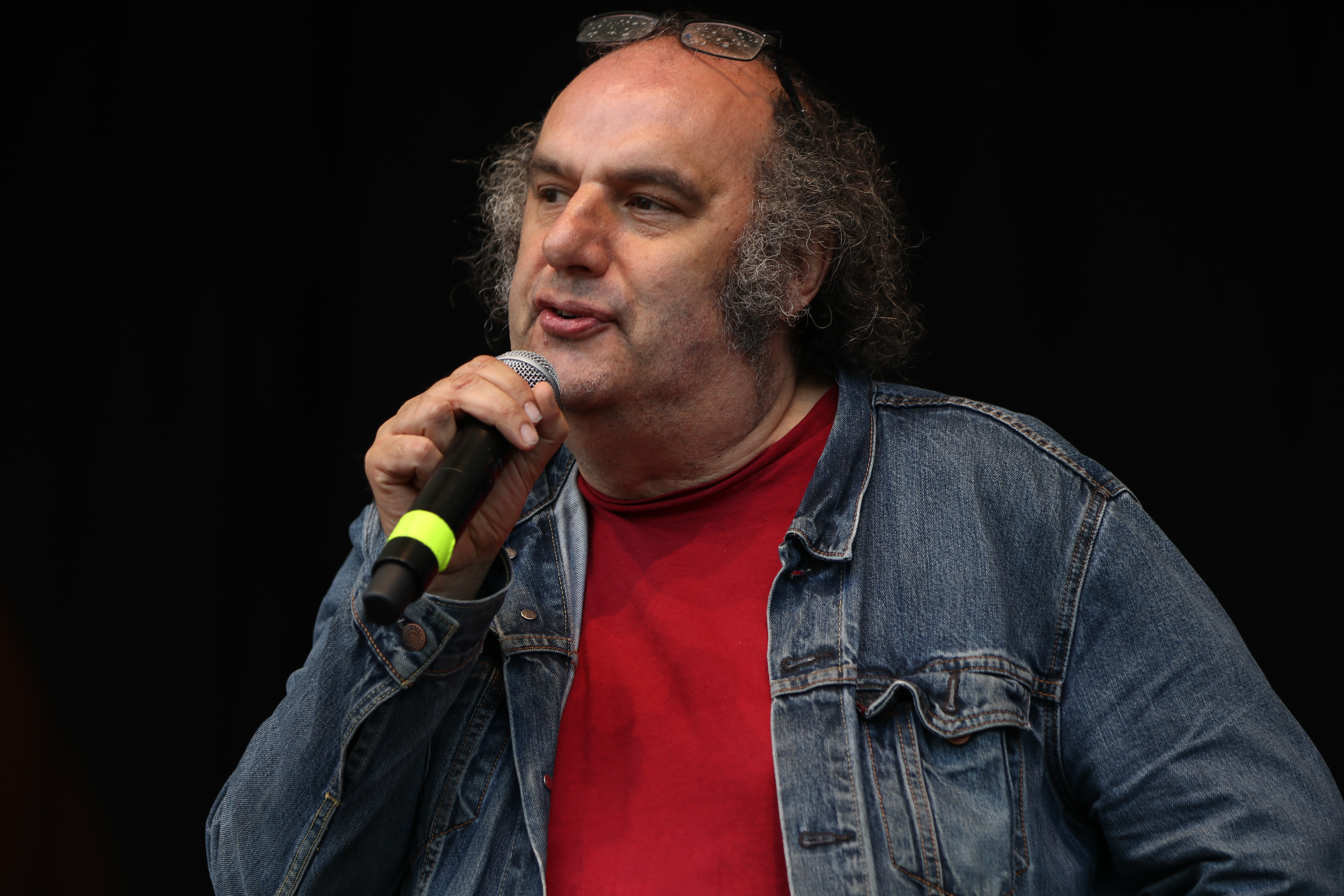
Matthias Lilienthal, 2018

== Life and work ==
Born in Berlin, Lilienthal grew up as the second of three children in Neukölln. After graduating from the Berlin Evangelisches Gymnasium zum Grauen Kloster (1978), he studied history, German studies and theatre studies at the Free University of Berlin, but dropped out after ten years.

=== Mid-1980s - 2002 ===
In the mid-1980s, Lilienthal worked as a freelance journalist for the taz, the zitty and the Süddeutsche Zeitung; he was then an assistant director to Achim Freyer at the Burgtheater in Vienna. From 1988 to 1991, under artistic director Frank Baumbauer dramaturge at the Theater Basel, where he worked with the then unknown Christoph Marthaler and tried to convince Baumbauer to bring Frank Castorf to Basel. When Castorf made him an offer, Lilienthal moved to the Volksbühne Berlin under Castorf's directorship and was chief dramaturge and deputy artistic director there until 1998. In 2002, he was programme director of the Theater der Welt festival in the Rhineland. He is also the initiator of the now internationally performed project X Wohnungen.

=== 2003–2014: Berlin, Beirut, Mannheim ===
In September 2003, Lilienthal became artistic director and managing director of the Hebbel am Ufer (HAU) in Berlin. In August 2010, he announced that he would not extend his contract beyond 2012. Instead, he worked with young artists in Beirut for ten months from autumn 2012. The jurors of the magazine Theater heute chose Hebbel am Ufer under Lilienthal's direction as the 2012 Theatre of the Year. In 2014, he directed the international Theater der Welt festival in Mannheim.

=== 2015–2020: Munich ===
Since the 2015/2016 season, Lilienthal has been artistic director of the Munich Kammerspiele, succeeding Johan Simons. For his directorship, he announced the inclusion of "free groups or certain aesthetics of the independent scene in the city theatre" and the cooperation with theatre collectives such as She She Pop, Rimini Protokoll and Gob Squad.

Already before the start of the season, Lilienthal called for a worldwide tender for the art action Shabbyshabby Apartments: For four weeks in autumn 2015, 24 temporary huts and cottages stood in central locations in the city, preferably in places that stand for high rents such as Maximilianstraße. These accommodations could each be rented for 35 euros per person per night including breakfast in the theatre canteen in 2015. The project was intended to draw attention to Munich's high rental prices. The action was organised by Benjamin Foerster-Baldenius and Axel Timm from the raumlaborberlin. With Foerster-Baldenius, Lilienthal had already carried out a very similar project entitled Hotel Shabbyshabby at the Nationaltheater Mannheim in 2014.

In March 2018, it was announced that Lilienthal would not seek an extension for his contract at the Kammerspiele, which ran until 2020. In summer 2019, however, critics named the Kammerspiele Theatre of the Year, Christopher Rüping's Dionysos Stadt was best production, and other prizes were awarded for acting, stage design and young actors. The Berliner Theatertreffen invited productions of the Kammerspiele.

To mark the farewell of Lilienthal's directorship, the Olympiastadion in Munich was staged because of Corona. The Japanese director Toshiki Okada staged the Opening Ceremony, a one-hour performance with the Kammerspiele ensemble. The premiere on 11 July 2020 was "a spun-poetic piece" that alluded to this summer's Olympic Games in Japan, which were cancelled due to Corona, which most theatre critics from FAZ to Süddeutsche Zeitung to taz reviewed predominantly favourably.

=== Influences and theatre conception ===
Lilienthal described as his most impressive theatre experience the production Winterreise im Olympiastadion by Klaus Michael Grüber, which he saw in Berlin in 1977, "300 spectators shivering in the Olympic Stadium at minus 20 degrees". When asked about important teachers, Lilienthal named Frank Castorf, Christoph Marthaler, Frank Baumbauer, Wilfried Schulz and his friendship with Christoph Schlingensief.

Lilienthal does not see theatre as an elitist space, but as a place for reflection and encounter that takes up the themes of a city and plays them back into the streets, as a "laboratory for trying out urban living space"

=== Membership ===
Lilienthal has been a member of the Academy of Arts, Berlin since 1999.
