= Ignaz Kirchner =

German actor

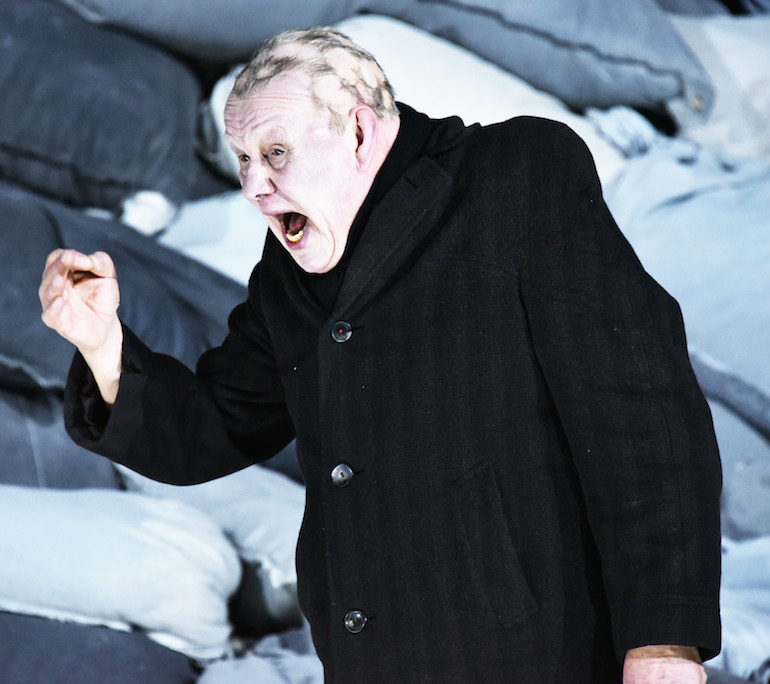
- Kirchner acting, in Tolstoy's The Power of Darkness at the Akademietheater, in 2015
- Born: Hanns-Peter Kirchner-Wierichs; 13 July 1946; Wuppertal, Germany
- Died: 26 September 2018 (aged 72); Vienna, Austria
- Education: Schauspielschule Bochum
- Occupations: Actor, director
- Organizations: Münchner Kammerspiele; Burgtheater
- Awards: Kainz Medal; Actor of the Year

Ignaz Kirchner (born Hanns-Peter Kirchner-Wierichs; 13 July 1946 – 26 September 2018) was a German actor who made a career on German-speaking stages, especially at Vienna's Burgtheater where he played for 30 years. A character actor, he worked with leading stage directors. He often played opposite Gert Voss, both in classical drama such as Shakespeare's Antonio, with Voss as Shylock, and as Jago, with Voss as Othello, and especially in black comedies, such as Goldberg in Tabori's Die Goldberg-Variationen (with Voss as Mr. Jay), and in Neil Simon's The Sunshine Boys, Beckett's Endspiel and Genet's Die Zofen. Kirchner and Voss were named Schauspielerpaar des Jahres twice, in 1992 and 1998.

== Career ==
Born in Wuppertal, Kirchner was raised from age ten in a Jesuit boarding school in Vorarlberg, Austria. He later chose the name of Ignatius of Loyola as his stage name. He first was an apprentice in a book shop, and then trained in acting at the Schauspielschule Bochum. He made his stage debut in 1970, when he was still at university, in Roger Vitrac's Der Coup von Trafalgar staged by Alfred Kirchner. The actor played in 1973 and 1974 at the Freie Volksbühne Berlin, participating in two productions by Wilfried Minks. In 1974 he moved on to Stuttgart, on an invitation by Claus Peymann, where he remained until 1978. He then worked for Theater Bremen, where he had his greatest success in the title role of Shakespeare's Hamlet, directed in 1980 by Jürgen Gosch.

From 1982 to 1986, Kirchner was a member of the Münchner Kammerspiele, where he worked with directors such as Dieter Dorn, Ernst Wendt and Thomas Langhoff. There he met George Tabori, with whom he would later collaborate at the Burgtheater in Vienna. In the 1983/84 season, he appeared at the Schauspiel Köln as the Duke in Marivaux's Der Streit, directed by Benjamin Korn, also as Lopachin in Chekhov's Der Kirschgarten, directed by Jürgen Flimm, and as Estragon in Beckett's Warten auf Godot, directed by Gosch.

In 1987, Kirchner became a member of the Burgtheater, where Peymann was now Intendant. His first role was as Schlomo Herzl in the premiere of Tabori's Mein Kampf. Further roles included in 1988 the title role Ödipus, Tyrann by Sophocles and Heiner Müller, directed by Matthias Langhoff, and Antonio in Shakespeare's Der Kaufmann von Venedig. In 1990, he played Doctor Lvov in Chekhov's Ivanov, staged by Peter Zadek, and Jago with Tabori. He and his partner on stage, Gert Voss, were awarded the Actor Duo of the Year (Schauspielerpaar des Jahres) prize by the trade magazine theater heute in 1991 for the roles as Mr. Jay and Goldberg in Tabori's black comedy Die Goldberg-Variationen. The two actors had first played antagonists in classical drama, such as Shylock and Antonio, and Othello and Jago. The paper wrote: "Wie Shylock und Antonio, wie Othello und Jago sind auch Mr. Jay und Goldberg ein sadomasochistisches Männerpaar – eine Kombination wie Herr und Knecht, Vater und Sohn, Laurel und Hardy." (Like Shylock and Antonio, and Othello and Jago, Mr. Jay and Goldberg are also a sadomasochistic male couple, a combination like master and servant, father and son, and Laurel and Hardy.) The two later played together in Neil Simon's The Sunshine Boys (2003), Beckett's Endspiel and Genet's Die Zofen. In 1992, Kirchner appeared as Macduff in Shakespeare's Macbeth, directed by Peymann. He performed solo programs such as Wilhelm Reich's Rede an den kleinen Mann and a series reciting Robert Walser's novels.

In the 1992/93 season, Kirchner moved to the Deutsches Theater Berlin, where he played in Ostrovsky's Der Wald, staged by Thomas Langhoff, and Sosias in Kleist's Amphitryon, staged by Gosch. He then moved to the Hamburg Thalia Theater, appearing in 1995 as the Doctor in Schnitzler's Das weite Land directed by Flimm, in 1996 Zettel in Shakespeare's Ein Sommernachtstraum with director Jens-Daniel Herzog, and the title role of Molière's Tartuffe, again with Flimm.

From 1997, Kirchner was back at the Burgtheater. He played in 1998 Clov in Beckett's Endspiel alongside Voss as Hamm, staged by Tabori in a production that was invited to the Berliner Theatertreffen. For this performance Kirchner and Voss won again the award Actor Duo of the Year. In 1999 he appeared as Schigolch in Wedekind's Lulu, staged by Andreas Kriegenburg. He played Solange in Die Zofen, directing himself with Voss and his wife Ursula Voss, and Dr. Dorn in Chekhov's Die Möwe with Luc Bondy, both in 2000. A year later, he appeared as Sandperger in Karl Schönherr's Glaube und Heimat with Martin Kušej, and a supervisor and a policeman in Roberto Zucco by Bernard-Marie Koltès with Klaus Michael Grüber. In 2002, he appeared as Uta-Napishti in the premiere of Raoul Schrott's Gilgamesh with Theu Boermans, and as Richard in the Austrian premiere of Thomas Bernhard's Elisabeth II with Thomas Langhoff. He performed again solo programs such as Walser's Der Spaziergang and Bernhard's Der Stimmenimitator and Minetti. From 2005, he played in a Burgtheater production of Klaus Pohl's Der Anatom at the Anatomischer Saal der Bildenden Künste, the play's only role. He appeared at the Salzburg Festival in the speaking role Samiel in Weber's opera Der Freischütz in 2005, staged by Falk Richter.

The major role of Fürst Bolkonskyi in a dramatization at the Burgtheater of Tolstoy's novel Krieg und Frieden won him a nomination for the Nestroy Prize in the category "best leading role" in 2010. In 2011, Kirchner played there Pozzo in Warten auf Godot, staged by Matthias Hartmann. In the years 2012 to 2014, he worked there with René Pollesch, Frank Castorf, Jan Bosse and Antú Romero Nunes and pursued other series of readings, from 2010 Fernando Pessoa's Buch der Unruhe and Musil's Der Mann ohne Eigenschaften.

Kirchner died on 26 September 2018 after a long illness.

== Filmography ==
- 1977: The Brothers (directed by Wolf Gremm) – Pfleger
- 1989: Hanna Monster, Liebling (directed by Christian Berger) – Rudolf
- 1995: Jailbirds (directed by Detlev Buck) – Mohrmann
- 1999: Sonnenallee (directed by Leander Haußmann) – Onkel Heinz
- 1999: Klemperer – Ein Leben in Deutschland (TV Series)
- 2000: Zimmer mit Frühstück (TV Movie, directed by Michael Verhoeven – Rudolf
- 2005: NVA (directed by Leander Haußmann) – Futterknecht
- 2005: Intrigue and Love (TV Movie, directed by Leander Haußmann) – Herr Miller
- 2007: Teufelsbraten (TV Movie, directed by Hermine Huntgeburth) – Lehrer Mohren
- 2009: Dinosaurier – Gegen uns seht ihr alt aus! (directed by Leander Haußmann) – Victor Semlitsch (final film role)

== Awards ==
- 1991 – For Jago in Othello: Kainz Medal of Vienna
- 1992 – Actor Duo of the Year (with Gert Voss) for Tabori's Die Goldberg-Variationen
- 1998 – Actor Duo of the Year (with Gert Voss) for Beckett's Endspiel
- 2001 – Nomination for Nestroy Prize for best supporting role
- 2004 – Silver Ehrenzeichen für Verdienste um das Land Wien
- 2008 – Kammerschauspieler
- 2010 – Nomination for Nestroy Prize for best leading role

== Literature ==
- Sucher, Curt Bernd (1988). Theaterzauberer. Schauspieler. 40 Portraits. Munich/Zurich: Piper. ISBN 3-492-03125-0.
- Becker, Peter von (1992). "'Willst Du mich einen Virtuosen schimpfen' Gert Voss und Ignaz Kirchner – ein freundschaftliches Streitgespräch über Kunst und Wahnsinn des Theaters". In Merschmeier, Michael; Rischbieter, Henning (eds.). Theater heute. Jahrbuch (in German). pp. 38–51.
- Dermutz, Klaus (2007). Bachler, Klaus (ed.). Tragikomiker: Ignaz Kirchner / Martin Schwab. Vienna: Deuticke im Zsolnay Verlag. ISBN 978-3-552-06064-7.
- Tenner, Haide; Kirchner, Ignaz (2016). Immer an der Grenze der Verrücktheit. Amalthea Signum. ISBN 978-3-99050-059-0.
