= Niklas Kohrt =

German actor

Niklas Kohrt (born 21 March 1980 in Luckenwalde, Bezirk Potsdam) is a German actor.

== Life ==
Niklas Kohrt spent his childhood and youth in Berlin]. In 1999 he got his "Abitur" at the Karl-Schiller-Oberschule and began his one-year national service in a hospital.

In October 2000 he started studying culture-, politics- and theater science at the Humboldt-Universität zu Berlin first. After two years he stopped his studies to study at the Hochschule für Schauspielkunst „Ernst Busch“ Berlin. During his studies for acting, he was engaged for the role of Keith in Lars Norens play Kälte in 2004, which played at the Deutschen Theater in Berlin. In the season 2005/2006 Niklas Kohrt became a member of the theater ensemble at the Deutsches Theater and acted in several plays, and he also acted in several films for cinema such as Teenage Angst.

In 2008 he received the Alfred-Kerr-Darstellerpreis des Berliner Theatertreffens for his performance in Gerhart Hauptmanns Die Ratten as Bruno Mechelke. A little later he was chosen as best newcomer (bester Nachwuchsschauspieler) by the committee of the magazine Theater heute for the same role.

Beginning with season 2009/2010 Niklas Kohrt became a member of the theater ensemble at the das Schauspielhaus Zürich, as guest actor he was taking part in several plays at the Deutsches Theater in Berlin.

== Theater ==
=== Deutsches Theater Berlin ===
- 2004: Kälte (Lars Noren / director: Robert Schuster / role: Keith)
- 2005: The Confusions of Young Törless (Robert Musil / director: Dušan David Parizek / role: Reiting)
- 2005: Tartuffe (Molière / director: Robert Schuster / role: Damis)
- 2006: Auf der Greifswalder Straße (Roland Schimmelpfennig / director: Jürgen Gosch / role: Fritz)
- 2006: Schlaf (Jon Fosse / director: Michael Thalheimer / role: erster junger Mann)
- 2007: Das Reich der Tiere (Roland Schimmelpfennig / director: Jürgen Gosch / role: Chris)
- 2007: A Midsummer Night's Dream (Ein Sommernachtstraum, German version) (William Shakespeare / director: Jürgen Gosch / role: Lysander)
- 2007: Die Ratten (Gerhart Hauptmann / director: Michael Thalheimer / role: Bruno Mechelke)
- 2007: Triumph der Liebe (Pierre Carlet de Marivaux / director: Barbara Frey / role: Gärtner)
- 2008: Roberto Zucco (Bernard-Marie Koltès / director: Jakob Fedler / role: Zucco)
- 2008: Was ihr wollt (William Shakespeare / director: Michael Thalheimer / role: Sir Andrew Bleichenwang)
- 2008: My Own Private Germany (director: Robert Borgmann / role: Christian)
- 2009: True West (Sam Shepard / director: Sabine Auf der Heyde / role: Austin)
- 2009: Idomeneus (Roland Schimmelpfennig / director: Jürgen Gosch)

=== Schauspielhaus Zürich ===
- 2009: Martin Salander (Thomas Jonigk after the novel by Gottfried Keller / director: Stefan Bachmann / role: Arnold)
- 2009: Triumph der Liebe (Pierre Carlet de Marivaux / Regie: Barbara Frey / role: Gärtner)
- 2009: Der Revisor (Nikolaj Gogol / Regie: Sebastian Nübling / role: police man)
- 2010: Der Hofmeister (Jakob Michael Reinhold Lenz / director: Frank Castorf / role: Läuffer)

== Filmography ==
=== Television ===
- 1992: Achterbahn – Unter Verdacht (Rollercoaster - Under Suspicion) (ZDF / director: Gabi Degener)

=== Cinema ===
- 1995: Das Versteck (The Hiding Place) (dffb-short film / Regie: Saskia Kuipers)
- 2003: Ganga Guest House (dffb-short film / director: David Sieveking)
- 2004: Muxmäuschenstill (director: Marcus Mittermeier)
- 2005: Mein ganz gewöhnliches Leben (My ordinary life) (director: Dominik Bechtel)
- 2006: Tough Enough (director: Detlev Buck)
- 2008: Teenage Angst (director: Thomas Stuber)
- 2011: Promising the Moon (director: Hans Steinbichler)

== Awards ==
- 2008: Alfred-Kerr-Darstellerpreis of the "Berliner Theatertreffen" for the role of Bruno Mechelke in Die Ratten
- 2008: Nachwuchsschauspieler des Jahres, chosen by the Jury of the magazine Theater heute
