= Goldberg Variations (play) =

1991 play by George Tabori

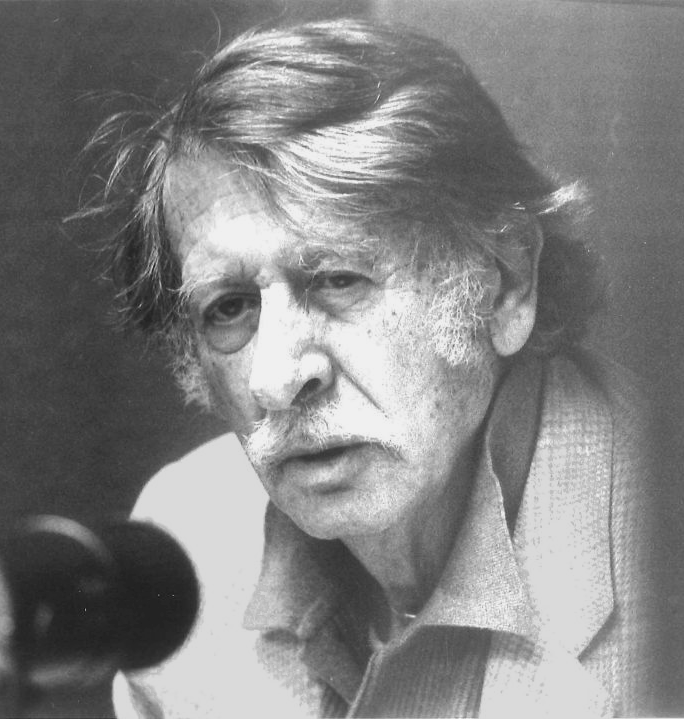
- The author and director of the premiere photographed in the 1980s
- Written by: George Tabori
- Characters: Mr. Jay; Goldberg; others
- Original language: English

Premiere
- Date premiered: 22 June 1991
- Place premiered: Akademietheater, Vienna

Goldberg Variations is a play by George Tabori which was first performed in 1991 in German as Die Goldberg-Variationen in Vienna's Akademietheater. The title alludes to Bach's Goldberg Variations, which is also used as background music. The play is set in Jerusalem and presents a disastrous rehearsal of a theatrical production based on the Old and New Testaments, directed by Mr. Jay, a god-like figure. His assistant is Goldberg, a Jew who has escaped from the Nazis. Plot points include Creation, the fall of man, the binding of Isaac, the golden calf, and the Crucifixion, all presented with a satirical combination of seriousness and farce.

== History ==
Tabori wrote the play in English, and it was translated by Ursula Grützmacher-Tabori. The premiere at the Akademietheater in Vienna on 22 June 1991 was directed by the author, with Gert Voss as Mr. Jay and Ignaz Kirchner as Goldberg. The actors were awarded the Actor Duo of the Year (Schauspielerpaar des Jahres) prize by the trade magazine Theater heute in 1991 for their performance. The play was published by Kiepenheuer. It received further stagings: Ingmar Bergman directed it at the Royal Dramatic Theatre in Stockholm in 1994, using Bach's variations and hard rock. A 2008 production by the Berliner Ensemble by Thomas Langhoff, with Dieter Mann and Götz Schubert, was still compared to the first performance.

== Plot ==
Alright, man is not God, but what if God is not God either?

— Goldberg Variations

In Jerusalem, Mr. Jay leads the rehearsal of a play which enacts scenes from the Old Testament in its first part, and from the New Testament after the intermission. Goldberg, a Jew who survived the Holocaust, is his assistant. The production, which Feinberg notes as an outstanding example of mise en abyme, presents "a series of disasters throughout the history of humankind where God has decided not to intervene". These scenes include Creation, the fall of man, the binding of Isaac, the golden calf, and the Crucifixion. The dialogue is liberally laced with direct quotes and allusions to verses from Scripture and lines from Shakespeare and Milton. Everything goes wrong in the rehearsal and Mr. Jay is thoroughly dissatisfied with it.

Mr. Jay has been identified with God, and also with Tabori. The play explores the relationship between Mr. Jay and Goldberg on several levels, with irony and bitter seriousness. The two antagonists depict the relationship between God and man, also father and son, victimizer and victim, antisemitic figure and Jew.
