= Die Schutzbefohlenen =

Play by Elfriede Jelinek

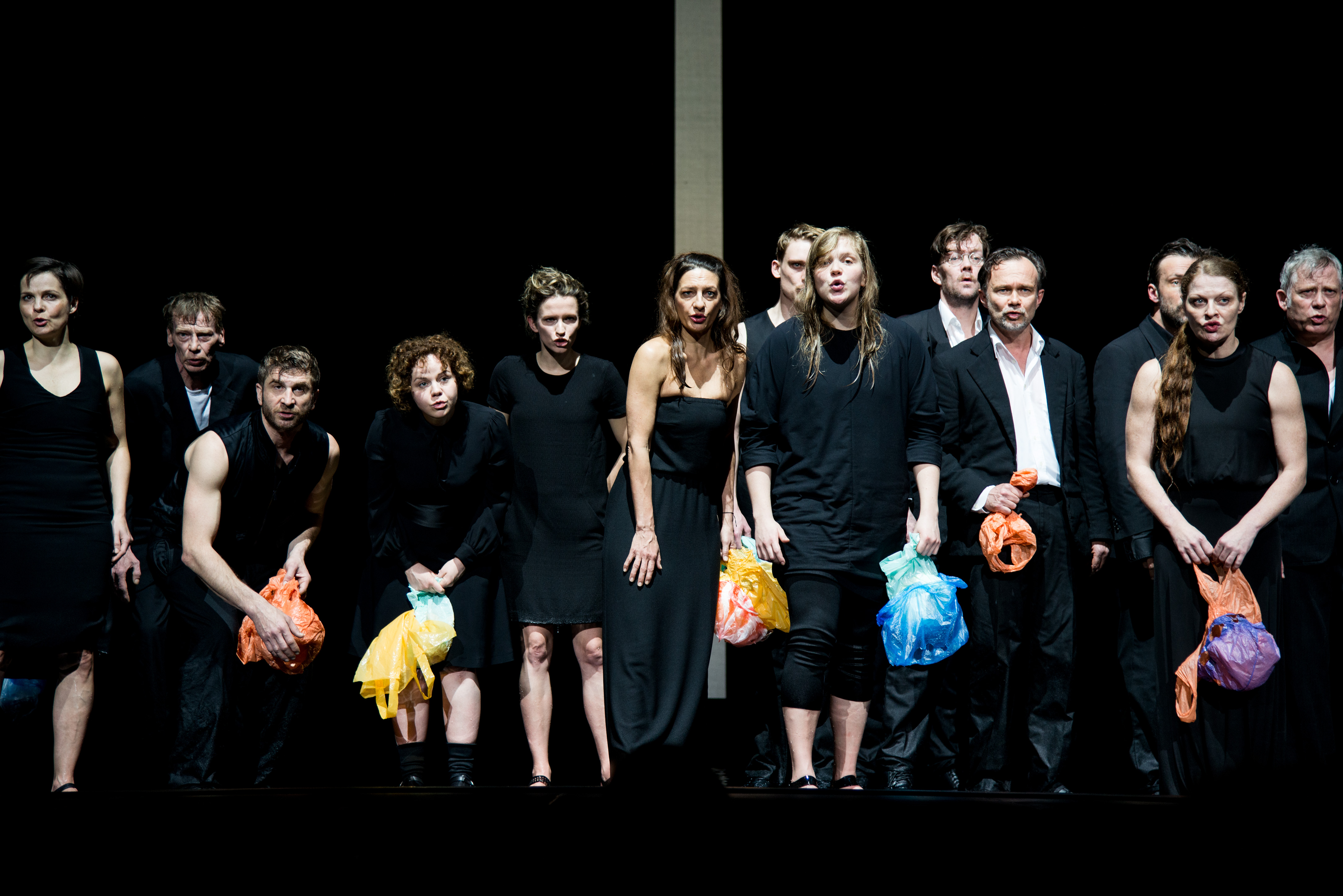
- Die Schutzbefohlenen at the Burgtheater in Vienna in 2015
- Written by: Elfriede Jelinek
- Original language: German
- Genre: Play

Premiere
- Date premiered: 23 May 2014
- Place premiered: Mannheim

Die Schutzbefohlenen (translated as "Charges (The Supplicants)" (Note: Both the German and the English titles are an allusion to the Ancient Greek play of a similar name. A more literal translation of the modern German title would be "those entrusted to protection".)), is a play by Elfriede Jelinek written in 2013. She termed it a Sprachkunstwerk, a language artwork. It deals critically with the politics at the time concerning refugees. The play was first read in Hamburg on 21 September 2013. The first scenic production was in Mannheim on 23 May 2014. The first production in Austria was staged at the Burgtheater in Vienna on 28 March 2015, which was recognised internationally. Later that year, Jelinek expanded the text to reflect the changed political situation.

== Theme ==
Die Schutzbefohlenen has a complex structure, with two intertwined parts: A modern story of refugees reaching Europe from Africa, and allusions to the ancient play The Suppliants by Aeschylus (which also has its protagonists arrive in Europe as refugees). (Note: In Aeschylus' play, the Danaïdes flee Egypt for Greece.) But while in the ancient story asylum is granted to the refugees, in Elfriede Jelinek's play they are denied protection (except for a few "rich" refugees not fleeing from Africa).

Thus its central theme is the conflict between humanitarian ideals as termed in ancient Greek culture, especially tragedy, with contemporary political human rights discourses in a situation when refugees from Africa flee to Europe, crossing the Mediterranean Sea and risking their lives. The play questions whether the European Union's policies at the time were still in line with human rights going back to ancient Greece. Jelinek used the language of the past to unveil the "rule of the powerful arbitrary gods of the economy" (Walten der mächtigen Willkür-Götter der Ökonomie).

== History ==
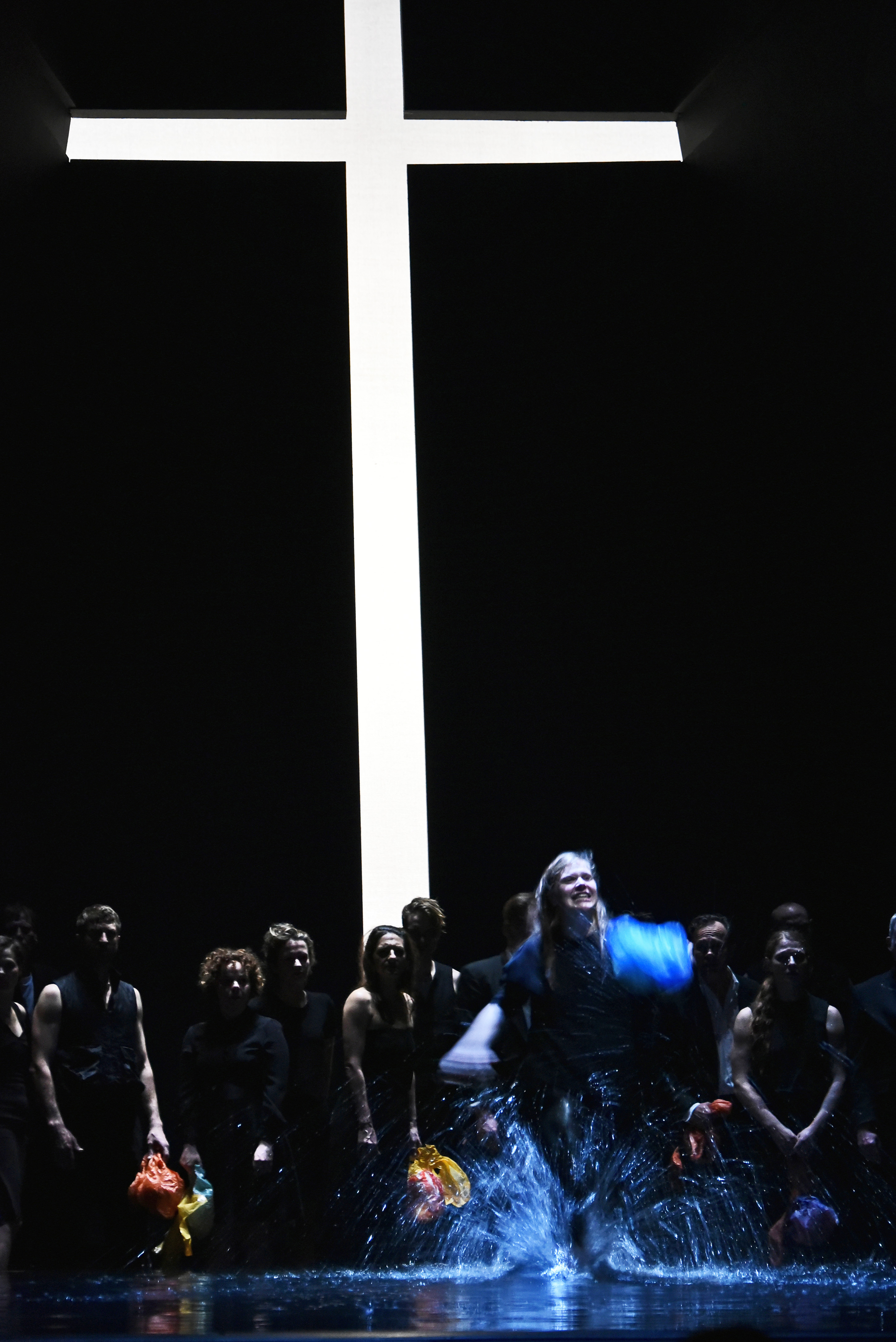
Die Schutzbefohlenen, Burgtheater 2015

Jelinek wrote the text for Nicolas Stemann's production Kommune der Wahrheit at the Wiener Festwochen 2013, but it was not used there. The Hamburg Thalia Theater was interested in the topic, in order to support a project Lampedusa in Hamburg to support refugees. It led to the original reading of the text at the St Pauli church on 21 September 2013, where 80 refugees had found shelter.

A Dutch premiere followed in a collaboration of Theater der Welt, Holland Festival, and the Thalia Theater. The first staged production was part of the Theater der Welt festival in Mannheim, directed by Stemann. The Austrian premiere was performed at the Burgtheater in Vienna on 28 March 2015, directed by Michael Thalheimer, with scenic design by Olaf Altmann and costumes designed by Katrin Lea Tag.

The play was later combined with the ancient play by Aeschylus which had inspired Jelinek, and the mixed play premiered at Schauspiel Leipzig on 2 October 2015 and at Maxim Gorki Theater on 13 November 2015.

=== Incidents ===
On 14 April 2016, around 40 members of the Identitäre Bewegung Österreich stormed the main lecture hall of the University of Vienna where Die Schutzbefohlenen was performed, spraying fake blood into the audience and throwing leaflets against multiculturalism. After an ensuing brawl in which both refugees (who participated in the play) and members of the audience were attacked, police arrived and managed to apprehend four of the offenders. Eight people were later charged with assault, several more because of the disruption. The mayors of Vienna and other politicians condemned the incident.
