= Katrin Lea Tag =

German costume and scenic designer

- Born: 1972 (age 53–54); Berlin, Germany
- Education: Akademie der bildenden Künste Wien
- Occupations: Scenic designer; Costume designer
- Awards: Ring Award; Scenic Designer of the Year 2020

Katrin Lea Tag (born 1972) is a German scenic and costume designer for drama and opera, whose works have appeared internationally. In 2020, she was named Scenic Designer of the Year by Opernwelt, for productions such as Barrie Kosky's Salome for the Oper Frankfurt.

== Career ==
Born in Berlin, Tag studied scenic design, painting and graphic art at the Akademie der bildenden Künste Wien from 1993 to 1999. In 1997, she won first prize at the Ring Award, the international competition for direction and stage design in Graz. She was often an assistant to Katrin Brack.

She was invited to design costumes for several productions of Dimiter Gotscheff in 2006, including Chekhov's Ivanov at the Berlin Volksbühne. The production was part of the Berliner Theatertreffen in 2006.

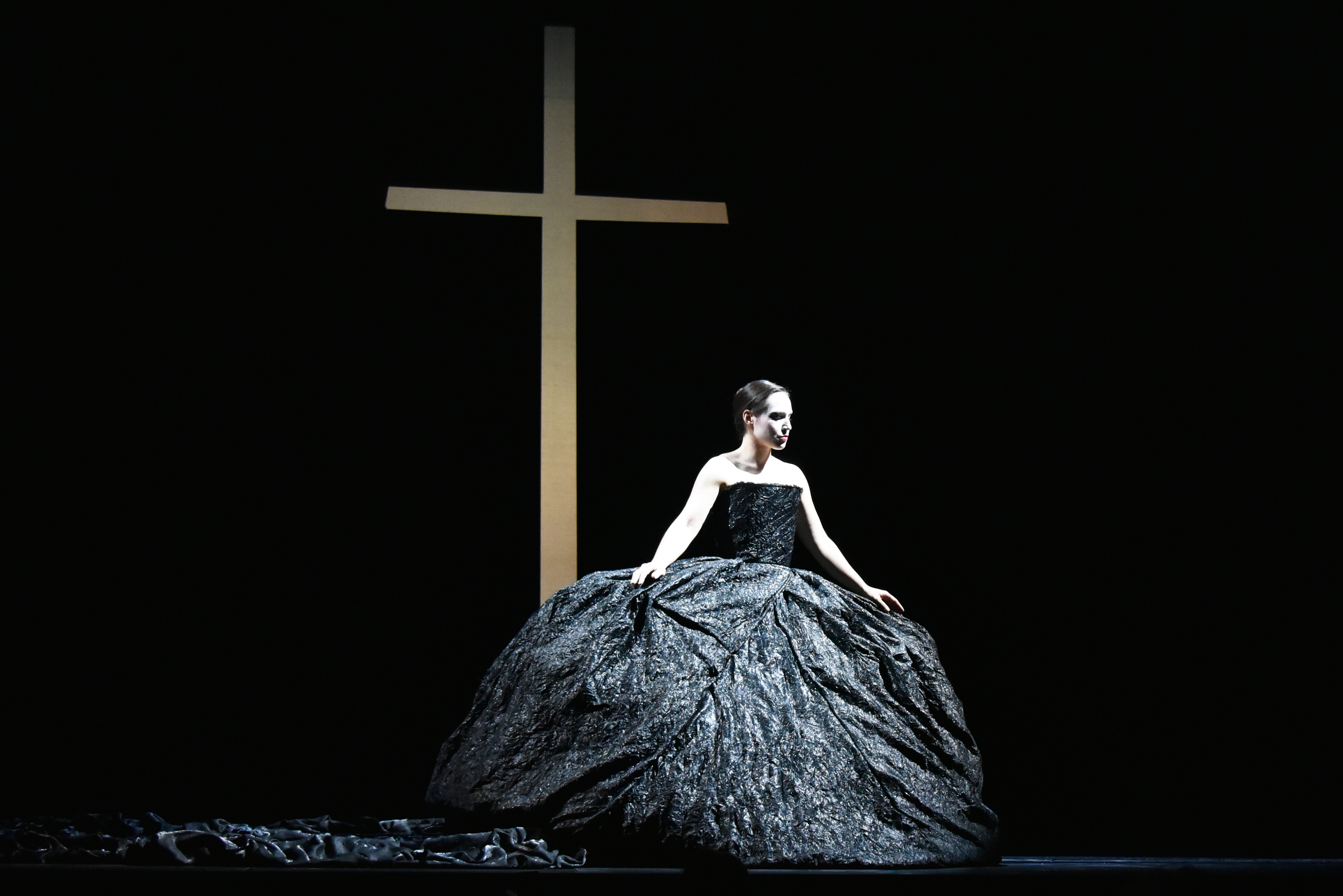
Die Schutzbefohlenen at the Burgtheater, 2015

She designed costumes in drama and opera for Michael Thalheimer at the Deutsches Theater Berlin, the Thalia Theater in Hamburg, Burgtheater in Vienna, Staatsoper Unter den Linden in Berlin, Royal Dramatic Theatre in Stockholm, and Schauspiel Frankfurt. With Barrie Kosky, she worked at the Staatsoper Hannover, English National Opera in London, and the Komische Oper Berlin. She designed for Christiane Pohle at the Ruhrtriennale 2005 and the Akademietheater in Vienna.

She designed sets and costumes for the Kosky production of Purcell's Dido, which premiered at Oper Frankfurt in 2010 and played at the Edinburgh Festival and the Los Angeles Opera in 2013. It was coupled with Bartók's A kékszakállú herceg vára (Bluebeard's Castle). Two 2015 productions recognised by critics and the audience were her set for Ariadne auf Naxos by Richard Strauss, directed by Hans Neuenfels at the Berlin State Opera, and her set and costume design for Jelineks Die Schutzbefohlenen, directed by Thalheimer at the Burgtheater. Her set and costume design for Kosky's production of Bizet's Carmen at Oper Frankfurt was also presented at the Royal Opera House in London from 2017.

In 2020, she was awarded the "Set Designer of the Year" award, the German critics' choice by Opernwelt, for her design for Kosky's Salome in Frankfurt, among others.
