= Theaterpreis Berlin =

German theatre award

The Theaterpreis Berlin is a German theatre award, created in 1988 by the Stiftung Preußische Seehandlung in Berlin. It is awarded annually at the Berliner Theatertreffen to a person in German-language theatre. The prize sum is €20,000.

== Recipients ==
The following have received the prize:

- 1988 George Tabori
- 1989 Peter Stein and Karl-Ernst Herrmann
- 1990 Johann Kresnik
- 1991 Peter Palitzsch
- 1992 Jutta Lampe
- 1993 Botho Strauß
- 1994 Bernhard Minetti
- 1995 Claus Peymann and Hermann Beil
- 1996 Heiner Müller
- 1997 Pina Bausch
- 1998 Luc Bondy
- 1999 Henning Rischbieter
- 2000 Frank Castorf and Henry Hübchen
- 2001 Bruno Ganz
- 2002 Elfriede Jelinek
- 2003 Bert Neumann
- 2004 Christoph Marthaler and Anna Viebrock
- 2005 Peter Konwitschny
- 2006 Andrea Breth
- 2007 Ulrich Matthes
- 2008 Josef Bierbichler
- 2009 Jürgen Gosch, together with the scenographer Johannes Schütz
- 2010 Margit Bendokat
- 2011 Dimiter Gotscheff, Almut Zilcher, Samuel Finzi and Wolfram Koch
- 2012 Sophie Rois
- 2013 Jürgen Holtz
- 2014 Johan Simons
- 2015 Corinna Harfouch
- 2016 Shermin Langhoff and Jens Hillje
- 2017 Herbert Fritsch
- 2018 Karin Henkel
- 2019 She She Pop
- 2020 Sandra Hüller
- 2021 not awarded
- 2022 Amelie Deuflhard
- 2023 Sivan Ben Yishai
- 2024 Nele Hertling
- 2025 Christopher Rüping
