= Jürgen Holtz =

German actor (1932–2020)

- Born: 10 August 1932; Berlin, Brandenburg, Prussia, Germany
- Died: 21 June 2020 (aged 87); Berlin, Germany
- Education: Theaterhochschule Leipzig
- Occupations: Actor; artist
- Years active: 1957–2020
- Organizations: Volksbühne; Deutsches Theater Berlin; Berliner Ensemble; Schauspiel Frankfurt
- Awards: Adolf Grimme Prize; Gertrud-Eysoldt-Ring; Theaterpreis Berlin; Konrad Wolf Prize

Jürgen Holtz (10 August 1932 – 21 June 2020) was a German actor on stage and in film, and an artist and author. On stage he played leading roles in East Berlin, including with the Berliner Ensemble, and from 1983 in the West, in both classics such as Shakespeare and Brecht, whose Galileo he played at age 86, and contemporary theatre, such as the title role in the premiere of Moritz Tassow by Peter Hacks. In film, he played leading roles such as Egon Schultz in Ari Folman's Made in Israel. He received several awards including the Theaterpreis Berlin and the Konrad Wolf Prize.

== Life ==
Born in Berlin, Holtz attended the Humboldt-Oberschule in Berlin-Tegel in 1943, and from 1943 to 1945 the Oberschule in Neustadt bei Coburg, where he was evacuated. He returned to Berlin, hoping to find his parents. From 1945 to 1948, he again attended the Humboldt Oberschule, then the Schulfarm Insel Scharfenberg in Tegel. With other students, he left for East Berlin in 1949 when the director was fired; there he went to boarding schools in Döllnkrug and Himmelpfort, achieving the Abitur in 1952. Holtz studied acting at the Deutsches Theaterinstitut in Weimar from 1952 and at the Theaterhochschule Leipzig from 1953, graduating in 1955. His first engagements were in Erfurt (1955–1957), Brandenburg an der Havel (1957–1960), and Greifswald (1960 to 1964). He then performed at the Volksbühne am Rosa-Luxemburg-Platz in East Berlin, and from 1966 to 1974 at the Deutsches Theater there. Among his roles were the title role in the world premiere of Moritz Tassow by Peter Hacks in 1966, directed by Benno Besson, and Angelo in Shakespeare's Maß für Maß (Measure for Measure) in 1968, staged by Adolf Dresen.

From 1974, Holtz was a member of the Berliner Ensemble. In 1983, he remained in West Germany after a guest performance, working at the Theater Bochum and the Schauspiel Frankfurt. From 1995, he performed at the Deutsches Theater Berlin again, and from 2000 as a guest at the Nationaltheater Mannheim. He often worked in radio, film and television.

At age 86, Holtz performed from January 2019 the title role in Brecht's Leben des Galilei, adapted by Frank Castorf for the Berliner Ensemble to a six-hour event; he sometimes appeared naked.

Holtz's paintings have been shown in exhibitions, including at the Bernet Bertram gallery in Berlin in 2020. He wrote an autobiography, He, Geist! Wo geht die Reise hin? Reden. Einreden. Widerreden, published in 2015.

Holtz died of cancer in Berlin on 21 June 2020 and he was buried at the Stahnsdorf South-Western Cemetery.

== Film and television ==
Year	Title	Director	Role	Notes
2014	Stereo	Maximilian Erlenwein	Alter Geistheiler	
2010	Drei	Tom Tykwer	Elisabeth I / Elisabeth II	
2007	Du bist nicht allein	Bernd Böhlich	Herr Klotz	
2003	Good Bye, Lenin!	Wolfgang Becker	Ganske	
2001	Made in Israel	Ari Folman	Egon Schultz	
1993	Motzki	Wolfgang Menge	Title role	TV series
1989	Reporter	Klaus Emmerich, Hans Noever	Struck	TV series
1986	Rosa Luxemburg	Margarethe von Trotta	Karl Kautsky	
1985	Morenga	Egon Günther	Von Kageneck	
1957	Berlin – Ecke Schönhauser	Egon Günther	Geldwechsler	

== Writings ==
- Holtz, Jürgen (2015). He, Geist! Wo geht die Reise hin? (in German). Berlin: Theater der Zeit. ISBN 978-3-95749-011-7. (Autobiography)

== Exhibitions ==
- 2017: Jürgen Holtz. Zeichnungen, Aquarelle, Schriftfiguren (2017). Galerie Bernet Bertram, Berlin
- 2020: Kaspar, Puppe, Krokodil. Satiren, Karikaturen, Abstraktionen. Einzelausstellung 13. Juni bis 29. August 2020, Galerie Bernet Bertram, Berlin

== Awards ==
- 1990: Adolf Grimme Prize
- 1993: Actor of the Year (Theater heute)
- 1993: Gertrud-Eysoldt-Ring
- 2004: Hessischer Kulturpreis
- 2013: Theaterpreis Berlin
- 2014: Konrad Wolf Prize
