= Olaf Altmann =

German scenic designer and theatre director

Olaf Altmann (born 1966) is a German scenic designer.

Born in Karl-Marx-Stadt (now Chemnitz), Altmann began his theatre career as a stage technician at the municipal theatre. There, he also designed his first stage design for a production of Hasko Weber in 1990. After working at the Volksbühne in Berlin, he became a permanent stage designer in Chemnitz in 1993, where he worked for the first time with the director Michael Thalheimer, whose permanent stage designer he has been ever since.

Altmann has meanwhile also distinguished himself as a theatre director and has staged plays at the theatres in Kassel, Dresden and Cologne.

In 2001, Altmann was awarded the 3sat-Preis at the Berliner Theatertreffen for Liliom at the Thalia Theater in Hamburg (together with Thalheimer). In 2002, he was nominated for the Nestroy Theatre Prize. In 2008, Altmann received the award Stage Design of the Year from the magazine Theater heute for his stage design in Die Ratten at the Deutsches Theater Berlin. He also received the Faust award in 2008 for the same work. In 2016, he was awarded the Theaterpreis Hamburg – Rolf Mares for the stage design of the production of Les Troyens at the Staatsoper Hamburg.
