= Stephan Müller =

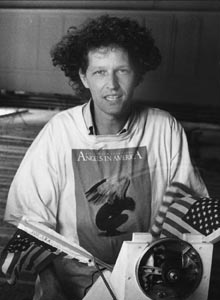
Stephan Müller at the Theater Neumarkt, Zürich (1993)

Stephan Müller (born 7 July 1951) is a Swiss theatre and opera director, dramaturge and a teacher of multimedia Aesthetics.

== Life ==
Stephan Müller was born at Oberbuchsiten (SO). His theatre career began in 1972 at the Theater Basel, then under Werner Düggelin and Hermann Beil. Müller was employed as an extra and assistant production director, later becoming the chief dramaturge. In 1975 he relocated to the United States where he worked for several years. Those with whom he worked there included Robert Wilson, Meredith Monk, Lee Breuer and Richard Foreman: he also worked with the avant-garde Mabou Mines theatre company. He himself was a co-founder of the "Red Wing/Mixed" group which existed in New York City between 1976 and 1980.

Returning to Switzerland, in 1978 he took a job at the Zürich Playhouse where he led the "Labor im Schauspielhaus" series. Between 1980 and 1988 he worked as a freelance play director in Cologne, Düsseldorf, Tübingen, Basel, Nuremberg, Frankfurt, Hamburg (Kampnagel), San Francisco and New York (Public Theatre). During this period he also worked regularly as a guest lecturer at the Berlin University of the Arts.

In 1988 he returned to the Theater Basel where by now Frank Baumbauer had taken over. Between 1993 and 1999, jointly with Volker Hesse, Müller took charge at the Theater am Neumarkt ("New Market Theatre") in Zürich. During this period the theatre's productions were particularly well regarded in German-speaking parts of Europe. Between 1999 and 2004 he worked at the Burgtheater in Vienna as a drama director and dramaturge. More recently he has been heading up the Master of Arts theatre production degree course at the Zurich University of the Arts, while also working as a freelance drama director.
