= 2018 Jungfernstieg double murder =

Double murder in Hamburg, Germany

On 12 April 2018, 34-year-old Sandra P. and her one-year-old daughter Mariam were murdered at the Jungfernstieg S-Bahn station in the Neustadt quarter of Hamburg, Germany. The perpetrator, 33-year-old Mourtala Madou (also Mado Bido Mourtala), the Nigerien ex-boyfriend of Sandra P. and father of Mariam, was arrested at the scene and convicted of two counts of murder in 2019.

The case was of significant public interest as the murder and preceding argument occurred in view of several bystanders. The Alternative for Germany (AfD) heavily focused on Madou's asylum seeker status, arguing that he should have been deported; Madou had no prior criminal record and a valid residency permit, but was considered a potential risk to his child by Jugendamt due to known anger issues.

== Background ==
=== Victims ===
Sandra P. was born in Neustrelitz, Mecklenburg-Vorpommern, Germany. She had been in a relationship with Mourtala Madou between 2013 and 2016. Their daughter, Mariam, was born in July 2016 and 21 months old at the time of her death. Mariam was the youngest of Sandra P.'s five children, who had different fathers.

=== Perpetrator ===
Mourtala Madou was born in Tahoua, Niger, to a French-speaking Tuareg family, growing up in a nearby village. Following the death of his father, Madou moved to Libya for migrant work as a gardener and plasterer, sending back money to his mother and sister. He fled the country in 2011 at the beginning of the Libyan civil war and was smuggled over the Mediterranean Sea via ship. The vessel crashlanded on Italy's Lampedusa island, with six people dying in the wreck.

In April 2013, Madou arrived in Hamburg on a Schengen visa, as part of the "Lampedusa group", used to refer to 300 sub-Saharan Africans from the Lampedusa immigration center. He received a residence permit and temporary housing, but within the same month of the group's arrival, the housing was terminated. 80 of the former residents, including Madou, were taken in by the pastor of St. Pauli Church. Part of this group formed Lampedusa in Hamburg, which unsuccessfully protested for work permits, with Madou participating before leaving the group after receiving toleration status the same year. Sometime in 2013, Madou met Sandra P. and the two started a relationship, living with her at a row house in Billstedt. Madou trained as a house painting assistant and was employed as a cleaner. There were no reports of domestic violence during the relationship and Madou was previously only arrested for property damage, which did not result in a conviction.

Madou separated from Sandra P. during her pregnancy, with the former moving out to public refugee housing in Wandsbek. Madou reportedly accepted the separation, but demanded to have access to his daughter, frequently showing up to Sandra P.'s house unannounced. Madou's behaviour became more aggressive in 2017, when Sandra P. pursued a new relationship, and despite the offer to co-parent Mariam, Madou refused to have another man become the legal father of their daughter. In January 2018, Madou sought custody of Mariam, but by April, the court told Madou that he was expected to lose the appeal. Madou had issued several death threats at Sandra P., which she did not take serious. A family court issued a brief no-contact order, which was reduced to supervised visits. Madou demanded full parental rights, arguing "She is my blood" in regards to Mariam. He had initially plotted to kill Sandra P.'s new boyfriend and began carrying around a 19-cm ceramic knife for this purpose. He had toleration status at the time, in part due to his existent partial parental rights to a German national child; Madou had already received permission to stay in Germany until mid-2019, before he filed for full custody of Mariam.

== Murders ==
On the morning of 12 April 2018, the victims and the perpetrator met at the Stadthausbrücke station, in company of a family assistant. Mariam reportedly appeared afraid of her father, with Madou arguing that Sandra P.'s new boyfriend had "used Voodoo" on Mariam to sway the child's opinion. The parties then left the station.

At 10:45, Madou encountered Sandra P., two of her children, including Mariam, and Sandra P.'s new boyfriend in the S-Bahn. Madou began an argument with Sandra P., which was continued as both parties exited at Jungfernstieg station. Three minutes after the argument began, Sandra P. said that Madou would not see their daughter again if he continued his behaviour and immediately after, Madou took the knife from his backpack and attacked Mariam, who was sitting in a buggy, stabbing the child in the abdomen before slitting her throat. As Sandra P. crouched down to grab Mariam, Madou stabbed Sandra P. in the back. Madou then threatened Sandra P.'s boyfriend before running out of the station. Madou then called police to be arrested, saying he "made a mistake" with his daughter, and repeated "I love my daughter" in German. Several eyewitnesses were treated for shock.

The first responding police officer rendered first aid on Mariam, but she died at the scene. Sandra P. later died at a hospital an hour later.

Boulevard papers claimed during early reporting that Mariam had been decapitated in the attack. In May 2018, authorities released information indicating that the child had not been beheaded. Although the stab wound to the neck was lethal, the initial wound to the stomach was the cause of death.

The father of two of Sandra P.'s sons, aged 6 and 8, took custody of his biological children. The father briefly took care of their 15-year-old half-brother, who later moved in with his aunt and grandmother. The fourth boy, aged 3, who witnessed the murders, was put into the custody of a children's house and later given into the custody of his father. Sandra P.'s boyfriend at the time, a Ghanaian national, reported to the authorities two weeks after the killings and filed for asylum to testify in court.

== Trial ==
The trial started in the Hamburger Landgericht in October 2018, where Madou was charged with double murder. He confessed to the crime at the start of the trial, and entered a guilty plea for manslaughter. His attorney argued that the killings had been a crime of passion without prior planning. Psychologists described Madou as having an "impulsive-narcissistic personality accentuation" and a brief episode of temporary psychosis while in jail, but did not diagnose a mental disorder. It was stated that despite Madou's belief in Voodoo and some paranoid delusions regarding persecution by inmates, prison staff, television and the radio, he was to be ruled legally sane. According to prosecutors, Madou acted out of anger and vengeance from being denied custody of his daughter, and that he had killed Mariam first to "punish" Sandra P.'s refusal. Madou acted erratically throughout his trial, occasionally refusing to enter the court room or asking to leave when footage or calls of the murders were played, at one point wishing to speak with the Nigerien ambassador to Germany, Boubacar Boureima, to request for repatriation.

In February 2019, Madou was found guilty of two counts of murder, carrying an automatic life sentence, after rejecting Madou's argumentation, citing the presence of malice aforethought. An appeal was denied in April 2020.

== Reactions ==
A spokesman for Hamburg police, Timo Zill, called the crime "substantial" and "unusual for Hamburg". Katharina Fegebank, Deputy Mayor of Hamburg stated that she was shocked about the crime: "If a child is stabbed by the hand which should protect it, this exceeds any imaginable cruelty."

Many citizens of Hamburg brought flowers and candles and mourned at the place of the crime.

Right-wing populist groups blamed the murders on lax immigration policies. The pastor of St. Pauli Church and Lampedusa in Hamburg were harassed and accused of bearing partial responsibility for their past association with Madou. The St. Pauli Church pastor and Lampedusa in Hamburg spokespeople emphasised that they had no contact with Madou since 2013 and called the right-wingers claims politically motivated.
