= Michael Thalheimer =

German theatre director

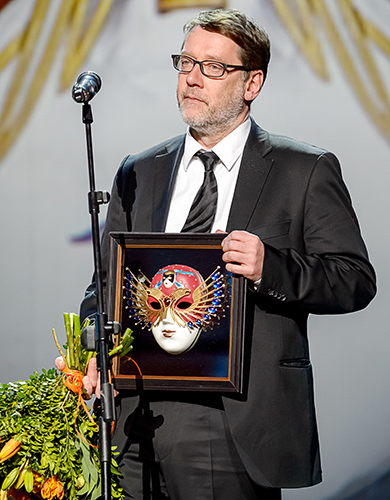
Michael Thalheimer in 2015

Michael Thalheimer (born 28 May 1965) is a German theatre director.

== Life ==
Born in Münster, Hesse, Thalheimer studied from 1985 to 1989 at the Bern School of Acting, now integrated into the University of the Arts Bern. As an actor, he was engaged at many German-speaking theatres, including in Bern, Mainz, Bremerhaven and Chemnitz.

In 1997, he presented his first production at the Theater Chemnitz: Fernando Arrabal's The Architect and the Emperor of Assyria. Since his work at the theatre in Chemnitz, he has worked with the set designer Olaf Altmann as a permanent collaborator. Many productions followed at renowned theatres such as the Theater Freiburg, the Theater Basel, the Schauspiel Leipzig, the Staatsschauspiel Dresden, the Thalia Theater in Hamburg, the Deutsches Theater Berlin and the Schaubühne of Berlin.

In 2005, Thalheimer made his debut as an opera director with Leoš Janáček's Káťa Kabanová at the Staatsoper Unter den Linden, followed in December of the same year by an interpretation of Verdi's Rigoletto.

At Hamburg's Thalia Theater in particular, Thalheimer acquired an reputation as a theatre director with productions of Schiller's Kabale und Liebe, Schnitzler's Liebelei and other classics. He is able to reduce even the most difficult material to its basic content and transport it emotionally and mentally. As a perfectionist, Thalheimer attaches importance to the facial expressions and gestures of his actors, who sometimes fill minutes of wordless phases, which are then replaced by a flood of text recited in paragraphs and performed in staccato.

After many successful years at Hamburg's Thalia Theater, Thalheimer shifted his work more and more to the Deutsches Theater in Berlin. After he had achieved the greatest success there in years with his two productions of Goethe's Faust I and Faust II, which were acclaimed by critics and audiences alike, he was head director from 2005 to 2008.

His production of Dea Loher's play Innocence became the subject of a protest action in spring 2012.

== Berliner Theatertreffen ==
- Liliom (Ferenc Molnár) at the Thalia Theater Hamburg, 2000
- Festen (after the film by Thomas Vinterberg) at the Staatsschauspiel Dresden, 2000
- Liebelei (Arthur Schnitzler) at the Thalia Theater Hamburg, 2001
- Lulu (Frank Wedekind) at the Thalia Theater Hamburg, 2005
- Oresteia (Aeschylus) at the Deutschen Theater Berlin, 2007
- Die Ratten (Gerhart Hauptmann) at the Deutschen Theater Berlin, 2007
- Medea (Euripides) at the Schauspiel Frankfurt, 2013

== Theatre (as director) ==
Schauspiel Frankfurt:

- 2012: Medea by Euripides
- 2013: Kleiner Mann, was nun? by Hans Fallada
- 2014: Nora by Henrik Ibsen
- 2015: Penthesilea by Heinrich von Kleist

Burgtheater / Akademietheater:

- 2010: Die heilige Johanna der Schlachthöfe by Bertolt Brecht
- 2012: Elektra by Hugo von Hofmannsthal
- 2014: Maria Magdalena by Friedrich Hebbel
- 2014: Die Schutzbefohlenen by Elfriede Jelinek
- 2017: The Persians by Aeschylus

== Awards ==
- 2001: 3sat-Preis im Rahmen des Berliner Theatertreffen for Liliom, Thalia Theater Hamburg (with Olaf Altmann)
- Friedrich-Luft-Preis for Emilia Galotti, Deutsches Theater Berlin
- Nestroy Theatre Prize for Emilia Galotti, Deutsches Theater Berlin
- Friedrich-Luft-Preis for Faust. Der Tragödie Erster Teil, Deutsches Theater Berlin
- Nestroy Theatre Prize for Elektra, Burgtheater Wien
