= Konrad Wolf Prize =

Art prize

The Konrad Wolf Prize (German: Konrad-Wolf-Preis) is a German performing arts, new media art and film award given since 1986 by the Academy of Arts, Berlin (formerly the East German Academy of Arts). It is named after the East German film director and former president of the academy, Konrad Wolf. The prize is awarded annually, alternating between the academy's Performing Arts Section and its Film and Media Art Section, and comes with a 5,000 Euros purse.

== Recipients ==
- 1986: Walter Heynowski, Gerhard Scheumann
- 1987: Rainer Simon
- 1988: Ruth Berghaus
- 1988: Helke Misselwitz
- 1990: Heiner Carow, Wolfram Witt
- 1991: Katharina Thalbach
- 1992: Peter Konwitschny
- 1993: Margarethe von Trotta
- 1994: Jürgen Flimm
- 1995: Ken Loach
- 1996: Christoph Marthaler
- 1997: Volker Schlöndorff
- 1998: Michael Haneke
- 1999: Ula Stöckl
- 2000: Klaus Michael Grüber
- 2001: Agnès Varda
- 2002: Jossi Wieler
- 2003: Abbas Kiarostami
- 2004: Lars von Trier
- 2005: Andres Veiel
- 2006: Wolfgang Engel
- 2007: Edgar Reitz
- 2008: Simon McBurney
- 2009: Avi Mograbi
- 2010: Alvis Hermanis
- 2011: Béla Tarr
- 2012: Meg Stuart
- 2013: Ostkreuz
- 2014: Jürgen Holtz
- 2015: Christoph Schlingensief (postum)
- 2016: Nicola Hümpel / Nico and the Navigators
- 2017: Márta Mészáros
- 2018: Lettre International
- 2019: Heidi Specogna
- 2020: Alexander Lang
- 2021: Abderrahmane Sissako
- 2022: Achim Freyer
- 2023: Julian Assange
- 2025: Klaus Völker, Kino Krokodil (Gabriel Hageni & Debora Fiora)
