= Gert Voss =

German actor

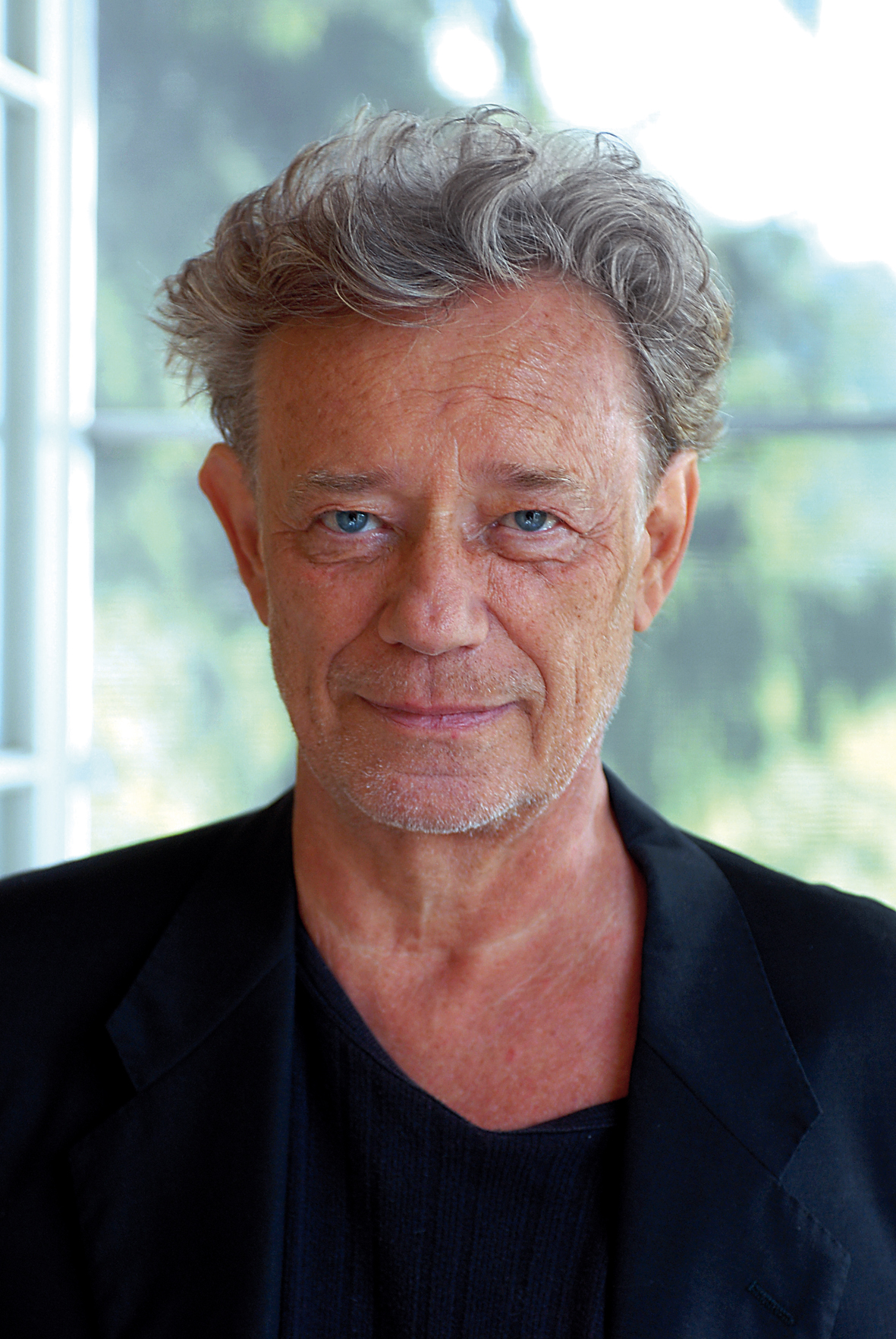
- Voss in 2011
- Born: 10 October 1941; Shanghai, China
- Died: 13 July 2014 (aged 72); Vienna, Austria
- Occupation: Actor
- Organizations: Burgtheater
- Awards: Order of Merit of the Federal Republic of Germany; Kainz Medal; Actor of the Year

Gert Voss (10 October 1941 – 13 July 2014) was a German actor. He was known for his roles in Labyrinth of Lies (2014), Sometime in August (2009) and Ritter, Dene, Voss (1987). He was member of the ensemble of the Burgtheater, and a Kammerschauspieler.

== Life ==
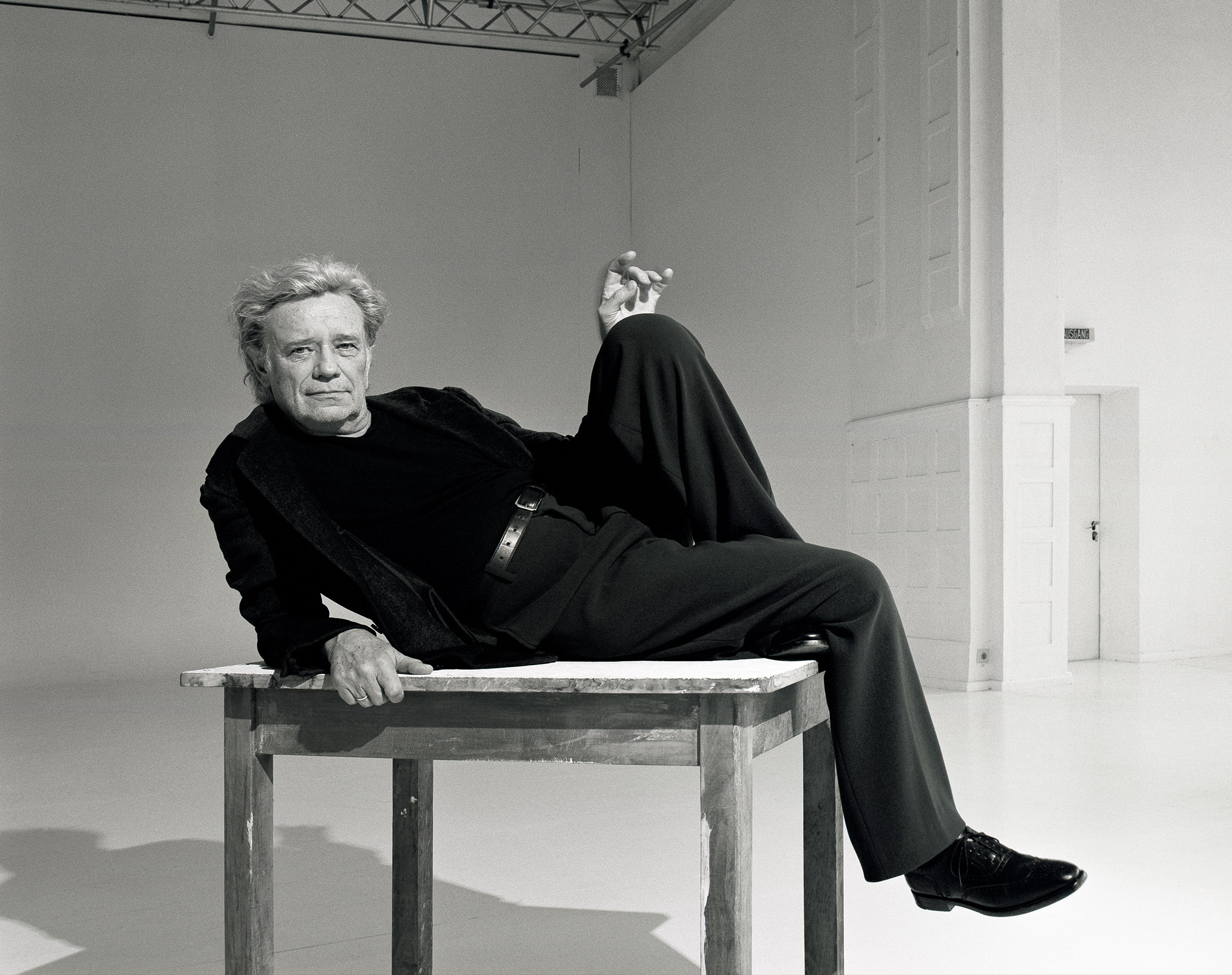
Gert Voss photographed by Oliver Mark, Berlin 2007

Gert Voss was born in Shanghai, China, to Wilhelm Voss, an import/export merchant, and his wife Marion (née Steinhütte). He lived in China until 1948 after which the family moved to a residence near Lake Constance. He studied German and English at the University of Tübingen for several semesters, but he broke off his studies when he succeeded in an acting proficiency test. Voss took private drama lessons from 1964 to 1966 with Ellen Mahlke, followed by his first theater engagements.

After his first engagements at the Stadttheater Konstanz, Staatstheater Braunschweig and at the Residenztheater in Munich, he was discovered by Hans Peter Doll, the director of the Heidelberg Theater. Under Doll, he next appeared at the State Theater in Stuttgart, where there was great discussion about the possible sympathies of director Claus Peymann for members of the Red Army Faction. He then moved to the Schauspielhaus Bochum with Peymann and in 1983 with the role of Hermann in Die Hermannsschlacht by Heinrich von Kleist was engaged at the 20th Berliner Theatertreffen.

Voss moved in 1986 with Peymann to the Burgtheater in Vienna, where he played in the same year Richard III. At that time, he and Peymann were criticised and not accepted by the audience in Vienna. The Peymann era in Vienna started also with Ritter, Dene, Voss, a work by Thomas Bernhard dedicated to the three main actors of the Bochum ensemble: Ilse Ritter, Kirsten Dene and Gert Voss. Over the next years, Voss collaborated with directors like Luc Bondy, George Tabori and Peter Zadek. He often played paired with Ignaz Kirchner, both in classical drama and black comedies.

From 1995 to 1998 Voss performed the Jedermann at the Salzburg Festival.

Voss died in Vienna, Austria, on 13 July 2014 from leukemia, aged 72. Prior to his death, Voss was Bruno Ganz's original choice to succeed him as holder of the Iffland-Ring, which by tradition distinguishes "the most significant and most worthy actor of the German-speaking theatre".

== Films ==
- Othello (1991) as Othello
- Radetzkymarsch (1994) as Graf Chojnicki
- Der Kopf des Mohren (1995) as Georg
- Doktor Knock (1996) as Dr. Knock
- Balzac – Ein Leben voller Leidenschaft (1999) as Victor Hugo
- König Lear (2008) as Lear
- Sometime in August (2009) as Bo
- Zettl (2012) as Alexander Sikridis
- Labyrinth of Lies (2014) as Fritz Bauer

== Awards ==
- Gertrud-Eysoldt-Ring for Richard III (1988)
- Kainz Medal for Richard III (1988)
- Officer's Cross of the Order of Merit of the Federal Republic of Germany (1989)
- Kammerschauspieler (1998)
- Nestroy Theatre Prize for Trigorin in Die Möwe (2000)
- Actor of the Year (Theater heute) (1983 Hermann, 1987 Richard III, 1990 Othello, 1992 Goldberg, 1998 Hamm, 2001 Rosmer)

== Bibliography ==
Voss, Gert (2011). Ich bin kein Papagei (in German). Vienna: Styria Premium. ISBN 978-3222133367.
