= Volker Hesse =

German Theatre producer (born 1944)

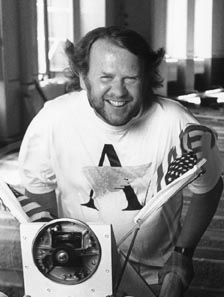
- Volker Hesse (left) at the Theater Neumarkt, Zürich (1993)
- Born: 30 December 1944; Hunsrück, Germany
- Occupation: Theatre director

Volker Hesse (born 30 December 1944) is a German Theatre producer. Between 2001 and 2006 he was the Theatrical Director at Berlin's Maxim Gorki Theater. More recently he has been working in Switzerland.

== Life ==
Volker Hesse was born in the Hunsrück region to the west of Frankfurt. His father was the opera director Rudolf Hesse. His time as a student at Cologne and then Vienna covered Theatre studies, German studies and Philosophy. He received his doctorate in 1972. His doctoral dissertation concerned the theatrical work of Bernhard Diebold ("Das theaterkritische Werk Bernhard Diebolds").

He took acting lessons with Will Quadflieg and then worked as an assistant to theatre directors such as Leopold Lindtberg and Hans Hollmann. His own first productions followed at the Vienna "Café Theatre", at the "Rampe" in Bern and at "Die Claque" at Baden. During the mid-1970s he was staging productions at venues such as the City Theatres in Bern and Trier, along with the Munich Kammerspiele (theatre). In 1979 Hesse became a member of the directing team at the recently opened new Düsseldorfer Schauspielhaus (theatre) where his productions included Graser's "Widow burning" (1980), Lessing's "Nathan the Wise" (1983) and "Henry, or the Pain of Fantasy" (1985) by Tankred Dorst. In 1985 he was invited to stage Arthur Schnitzler's Professor Bernhardi at the Berliner Theatertreffen drama festival. After 1985 there followed a period of freelance directing, taking in, among other venues, the Bavarian National Theatre in Munich and the Maxim Gorki Theater in Berlin.

In 1993, together with Stephan Müller, he took over at the New Market Theatre in Zürich. They remained in charge till 1999. Hesse's original production of "Sekten" (1995) and Top Dogs (1997) were invited to be part of the Berliner Theatertreffen drama festival. Müller then moved on to Vienna while Hesse returned to freelance work for a couple of years. In 2001 he took over as "Intendant" (director) at the Maxim Gorki Theater in Berlin, holding the appointment till the end of the 2006 season. In 2008, and again in 2012, he was in charge of the William Tell Theatre Festival ("Tellspiele") at Altdorf. He also produced Thomas Hürlimann's "Deadline" ("Stichtag") at the Lucerne "Südpol Culture House" Theatre.

During the twenty-first century Volker Hesse's theatrical work has been undertaken almost entirely in German speaking central Switzerland, and in 2010 he was honoured with the Swiss Hans-Reinhart-Ring theatrical award.

Volker Hesse was hired as director for the Gotthard Base Tunnel inauguration ceremony of June 1, 2016. The controversial opening ceremony was described as "disturbing", "demonic" and akin to a depiction of a "sex-orgy".
