= Konwitschny =

Konwitschny is a surname of Czech origin. Notable people with the surname include:

- Franz Konwitschny (1901–1962), German conductor and violist of Moravian descent
- Peter Konwitschny (born 1945), German opera and theatre director, son of Franz
