= Erna Baumbauer =

German casting agent (1919–2010)

- Born: 8 January 1919; Munich
- Died: 30 January 2010 (aged 91)
- Occupation: casting agent

Erna Baumbauer (8 January 1919 – 30 January 2010) was a German casting agent. She has been called the "grand dame of German casting agents" by The Hollywood Reporter for her long career in the German film industry, which spanned decades. She was nicknamed "the Queen of Bavaria" by one of her clients, actor Ulrich Mühe.

== Life ==
Bambauer was born in Munich in 1919, and stood 5'1" tall during her life. She began her career by working as a bookdealer and journalist. She founded her eponymous Munich-based talent agency, Erna Baunbauer Management, following the end of World War II, where she worked until her death in 2010. The Hollywood Reporter described her as knowing everyone with the German film industry. In one instance, film director Florian Henckel von Donnersmarck sent Baumbauer a script for his 2006 film, The Lives of Others, for her to cast directly. Baumbauer directly chose three actors from her agency to become the male leads for the film - Ulrich Muehe, Sebastian Koch und Ulrich Tukur.

Bambauer's client included Sebastian Koch, Maximilian Schell, Katja Riemann, Susanne Lothar and Bruno Ganz.

The German Film Academy awarded Baumbauer the lifetime achievement award in 2006. This marked the first time in the academy's history that a woman who was not a film director or actress by profession had received the honor.

== Death ==
Erna Baumbauer died on 31 January 2010, aged 91. She was survived by her daughter, Patricia, a talent agent, her granddaughters, Antonia and Francesca, and son, Frank Baumbauer, a theater director.
