= Frank Baumbauer =

German theater director and artistic (born 1945)

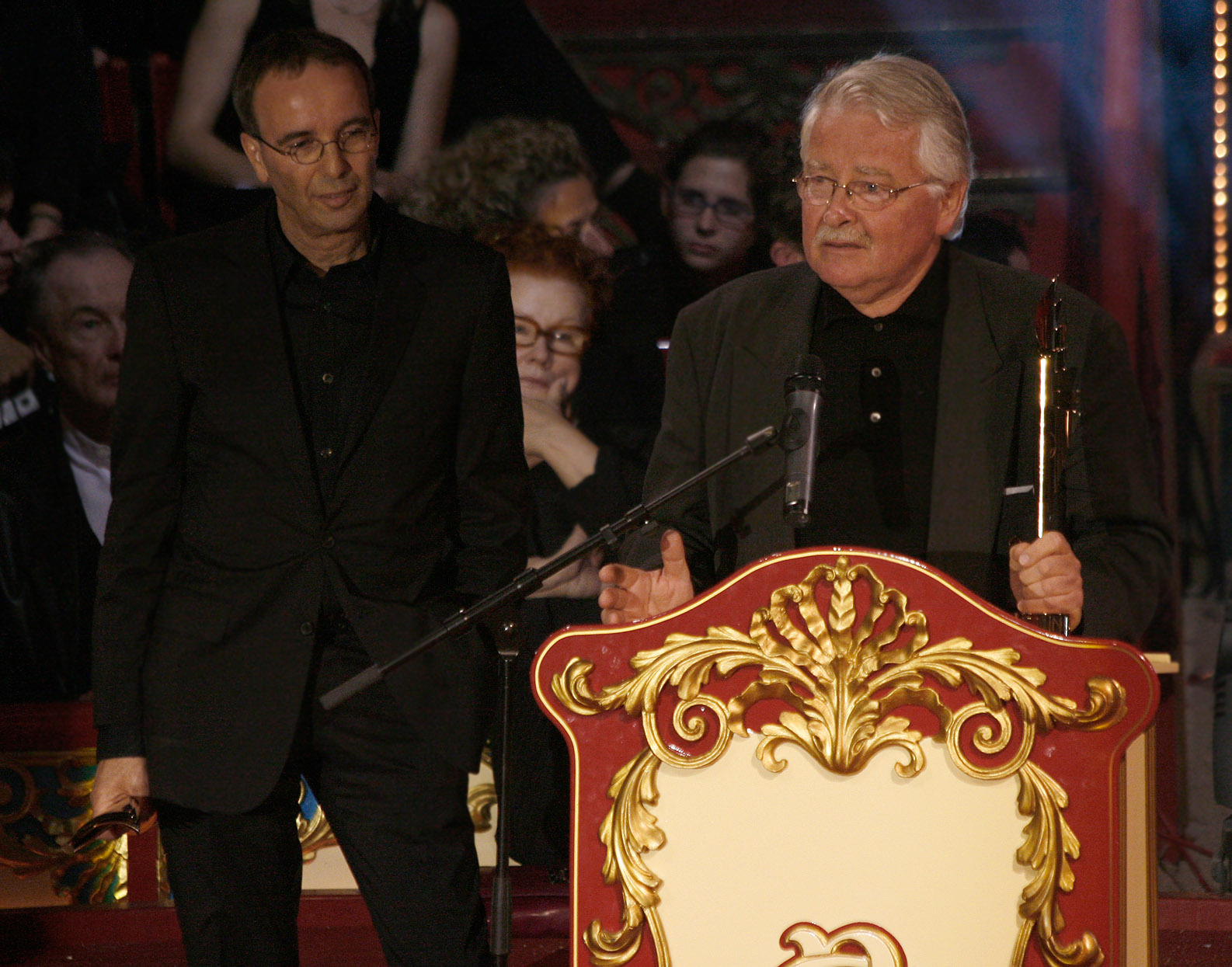
- Frank Baumbauer (right at podium) with Jossi Wieler (left) in 2009.
- Born: September 2, 1945 (age 80); Munich, Germany
- Occupations: Theatre director, artistic director
- Years active: 1970–present
- Known for: Artistic director of the Deutsches Schauspielhaus (1993–2000) and the Munich Kammerspiele (2001–2009)
- Spouse: Gundi Ellert
- Parent: Erna Baumbauer

Frank Baumbauer (born 2 September 1945 in Munich, Germany) is a German theater director and artistic director active in the German theater community. He is the son of German casting agent Erna Baumbauer. Baumbauer was from 2001 to 2009 the director of the Munich Kammerspiele.

== Life ==
Frank Baumbauer was born the son of a merchant and the theatrical agent Erna Baumbauer. After completing school, he studied German studies, sociology, and theatre studies at LMU Munich.

From 1970 to 1972, Baumbauer worked as an assistant director at the Düsseldorfer Schauspielhaus. He subsequently moved to the Bavarian State Theatre, where he served as an assistant director from 1972 to 1974. From 1974, he worked there as a director; in 1975, he became head of the artistic operations' office, and from 1980, he also served as personal assistant to the artistic director Kurt Meisel. In 1983, he was appointed drama director of the theatre.

In this position he engaged authors and directors such as Herbert Achternbusch, Werner Schroeter, and the cabaret performer Gerhard Polt, and defended them against criticism. He resigned in 1986 after the CSU sharply criticized political improvisations by Josef Bierbichler.

In the 1986–87 season Baumbauer served as deputy to the artistic director Ivan Nagel at the Stuttgart State Theatre, and from 1988 to 1993, he was director of the Theater Basel. There he engaged directors such as Christoph Marthaler, Jossi Wieler, Achim Freyer, Herbert Wernicke, and Hans Hollmann.

Because of the financial and personnel constraints at the theatre, he chose not to extend his contract beyond the 1992–93 season. Instead, in 1993—having received offers from three cities—he succeeded Michael Bogdanov as artistic director of the Hamburg Schauspielhaus. In this role he focused on maintaining a permanent ensemble and collaborating with influential writers such as Elfriede Jelinek and Rainald Goetz. Among the directors he newly engaged were Anselm Weber, Matthias Hartmann, Karin Beier, Frank Castorf, Johann Kresnik, Christoph Schlingensief, and Thomas Ostermeier. During Baumbauer's seven-year tenure, the Hamburg Schauspielhaus became a venue for experimental contemporary theatre and new theatrical forms. During this period the theatre was named Theatre of the Year by the magazine Theater heute in 1994, 1996, 1997, and 2000.

Despite being offered a contract extension, Baumbauer signed a contract in 1999 as a consultant for the drama programme of the Salzburg Festival. From 2001 until the summer of 2009, he served as artistic director of the Munich Kammerspiele, succeeding Dieter Dorn. As head of the Bavarian state theatre stages, he was also a member of the Bavarian Broadcasting Council of Bayerischer Rundfunk.

== Personal life ==
He is married to the actress Gundi Ellert.

== Awards ==
In April 2010 he received the 2009 Cultural Honorary Award of the City of Munich.
