= Motzki =

- Created by: Wolfgang Menge
- Starring: Jürgen Holtz
- Country of origin: Germany

Motzki is a German television series.

== See also ==
- List of German television series
