= Made in Israel =

2001 film by Ari Folman

- Directed by: Ari Folman
- Starring: Menashe Noy; Jenya Dodina
- Release date: 14 July 2001 (JFF)
- Running time: 1h 53min
- Country: Israel
- Language: Hebrew

Made in Israel is an Israeli film directed by Ari Folman, which was released in theaters on September 27, 2001.

The film was nominated for 13 Israeli Academy Television Awards, including the "Audience Favorite" award, and won two awards: the Ophir Award for Best Cinematography and the Ophir Award for Best Soundtrack. The film was also nominated for the Wolgin Award at the 2001 Jerusalem Film Festival.

The film's soundtrack was composed by Berry Sakharof and was released as a CD in December 2001.

== Plot ==
The plot of the film takes place "somewhere in the near future," according to the subtitle at the beginning of the film, and is set entirely in the Golan Heights in the days following the signing of a peace agreement between Israel and Syria. At the start of the film, two parallel stories unfold about two pairs of assassins sent by Hoffman, the son of a Holocaust survivor, to bring the last Nazi to Israel for a public trial, with a reward offered for his capture.

One pair of assassins is Vitaly and Dudu, two lovers from Russia. Vitaly is a highly experienced contract killer who served in the Red Army at the same time that Hoffman, the assassin handler, served there. The second pair is Peraḥ and Tik-Tik. Tik-Tik becomes involved in the chase after the Nazi, but Peraḥ is more experienced with weapons. Against these two pairs, the police, as part of their duty, also seek to bring the last Nazi to trial and initially imprison him. However, he quickly escapes from the vehicle where he was held due to the officers' lack of attention.

The entire film depicts a somewhat surreal situation, even in relation to the near future, in which the characters do not behave or speak like ordinary people. It can even be seen as something apocalyptic because very few people are visible in the film, aside from the main characters, and there are no tools, vehicles, or buildings that match any time period in 21st-century Israel.

== Cast ==
- Menashe Noy - Eddie Zanzury
- Jenya Dodina - Dodo
- Jürgen Holtz - Egon Schultz
- Sasson Gabai - Perach
- Dror Keren - Tiktak
- Igor Mirkurbanov - Vitali
- Tzahi Grad - Segal
