= Peter Konwitschny =

German opera and theatre director (born 1945)

- Born: 21 January 1945 (age 81); Frankfurt am Main, Hesse, Germany
- Education: Hanns Eisler Academy of Music
- Occupations: Opera and theatre director
- Years active: 1970–present
- Known for: Radical interpretations in Regietheater
- Title: Honorary Professor at the Hochschule für Musik "Hanns Eisler"
- Father: Franz Konwitschny
- Awards: Cross of the Order of Merit (1997); Theaterpreis Berlin (2005); Deutscher Theaterpreis Der Faust (2016); Opernwelt Director of the Year (5-time recipient); Opera! Awards Lifetime Achievement (2025)

Peter Konwitschny (born 21 January 1945 in Frankfurt am Main) is a German opera and theatre director.

== Biography ==
Peter Konwitschny grew up in Leipzig, where his father Franz Konwitschny was principal conductor of the Leipzig Gewandhaus Orchestra. After an aborted study of physics, he studied theatre direction from 1965 until 1970 in Berlin.

In the 1970s, Konwitschny worked as an assistant director with Ruth Berghaus at the Berliner Ensemble. From 1980 onwards he chiefly worked as a free-lance director. During this period he directed both opera and theatre productions in Berlin, Halle, Greifswald and Rostock. From 1986 until 1990 he was chief director of the Landestheater Halle. His Handel productions Rinaldo, Aci, Galatea e Polifemo and Tamerlano, as well as Rigoletto and Carmen received high acclaim.

Even though Konwitschny had already directed operas in West Germany (Bluebeard's Castle, Kassel, 1987, and Fidelio, Basel, 1989), it was only after the fall of the Berlin Wall, that his international career took off. After Puccini and Rossini operas in Graz, Leipzig and Basel, Konwitschny turned to Wagner: Parsifal (1995, Bavarian State Opera), Tannhäuser (1997, Dresden Semperoper), Lohengrin (1998, Hamburg State Opera), Tristan und Isolde (1998, Bavarian State Opera), and a highly acclaimed Götterdämmerung (2000, Staatsoper Stuttgart).

After Lohengrin, Konwitschny returned to Hamburg to cooperate with the conductor Ingo Metzmacher on Alban Berg's Lulu, Richard Wagner's Die Meistersinger von Nürnberg, and Arnold Schoenberg's Moses und Aron. In 2004 he directed Wagner's The Flying Dutchman at the Bolshoi Theatre in Moscow, in 2005 Richard Strauss' Elektra in Copenhagen and in 2009 Strauss' Salome in Amsterdam. Since August 2008, Konwitschny is principal director of productions at the Leipzig Opera.

In 2018, Konwitschny, was fired from the Gothenburg Opera due to a conflict between Peter Konwitschny and co-workers around the stage, during the rehearsals of Boris Godunov. The Gothenburg Opera CEO stated in a press release that This is a house where one is allowed to be angry, have conflicts and to make mistakes. But there is a limit to where a behavior towards co-workers becomes unacceptable. In this case, we could not afterwards reach a mutual understanding concerning the gravity of the situation. Therefore, we chose to terminate the cooperation. Konwitschny later issued a statement to the press, comparing the response to the Spanish Inquisition and vowing not to return to the opera house.

In terms of staging, his interpretations deviate significantly from the original material, drawing criticism from proponents of fidelity to the original work. In 1999, his Dresden production of "Die Csárdásfürstin" (The Czardas Princess), an operetta by Emmerich Kálmán, which Konwitschny relocated to a First World War trench, turned into a scandal when the artistic director of the Semperoper at the time, Christoph Albrecht, cut two scenes from the production after the premiere. Konwitschny obtained a temporary injunction against the modified version, leading to a legal dispute spanning two court instances. In early 2010 at the Graz Opera, the revival (Konwitschny's tenth production at this house) "hardly managed to stir any emotions."In the following years, Konwitschny implemented his concept of modern Regietheater (director's theater) primarily in Hamburg, alongside the General Music Director there, Ingo Metzmacher: Alban Berg's "Lulu," Richard Wagner's "Die Meistersinger von Nürnberg," and Arnold Schönberg's "Moses und Aron" became major audience successes. "Like no other director on the opera stage, Konwitschny is equally loved and hostility is directed at him in equal measure." At Moscow's Bolshoi Theatre, he staged Wagner's "The Flying Dutchman" in 2004 (with performances in Munich starting in 2006 and Graz in 2007), Strauss's "Elektra" in Copenhagen in 2005, Verdi's "Don Carlos" in Vienna in 2006 (new staging: 24 April 2012), and Strauss's "Salome" in Amsterdam in 2009. From August 2008 to 31 December 2011, Peter Konwitschny served as the chief director of the Leipzig Opera. In 2009, with his production of "King Lear" at the Schauspielhaus Graz, Konwitschny directed for spoken theater for the first time since the fall of the Berlin Wall. In 2011, he staged Giuseppe Verdi's "La traviata" for the first time. This work at the Graz Opera was followed in November 2011 by Tchaikovsky's "The Queen of Spades." His production of Leoš Janáček's "From the House of the Dead" was staged at the Vienna State Opera (conducted by Franz Welser-Möst) starting on 11 December 2011. On 15 December 2012, his production of "Faust" premiered at the Schauspielhaus Graz.

On 15 December 2012, his production of "Faust" premiered at the Schauspielhaus Graz.For the Theater an der Wien, Konwitschny staged Verdi's opera "Attila" under the musical direction of Riccardo Frizza (premiere: 7 July 2013). On 29 March 2014, his production of "Jenůfa" premiered at the Graz Opera (with a premiere at the Theater Augsburg on September 20). In 2015, he staged Wolfgang Rihm's "Die Eroberung von Mexico" at the Salzburg Festival in the Felsenreitschule, and in 2017, he directed Othmar Schoeck's opera "Penthesilea" at the Theater Bonn.

Following his previous productions of "Die Walküre" (2022), "Siegfried" (2023), and "Das Rheingold" (2024), "Götterdämmerung" in 2025 marks the conclusion of the tetralogy at the Dortmund Opera.

== Awards ==
- 1988: Art Prize of the German Democratic Republic
- 1992: Konrad Wolf Prize of the Akademie der Künste in Berlin
- 1997: Order of Merit of the Federal Republic of Germany (Bundesverdienstkreuz)
- 1998: Director of the Year, Opernwelt magazine
- 1999: Director of the Year, Opernwelt magazine
- 2000: Director of the Year, Opernwelt magazine
- 2005: Theaterpreis Berlin
- 2016: Deutscher Theaterpreis Der Faust
- 2018: Director of the Year, Opernwelt magazine
- 2025: Honorary and Lifetime Achievement, Opera! Awards
- 2026: Lifetime Award, International Opera Awards

Konwitschny is an honorary professor at the Hochschule für Musik "Hanns Eisler" in Berlin and a member of the Akademie der Künste in Berlin.

== Acclaim and critique ==
Some of Konwitschny's polarizing interpretations are far removed from the composer's or playwright's original idea. His 2000 production in Dresden of Die Csárdásfürstin, an operetta by Emmerich Kálmán, set by Konwitschny in World War I trenches, turned into a scandal and a lawsuit when the director of the Semperoper cancelled two scenes of Konwitschny's production.
