= Wolfgang Menge =

German television screenwriter (19424–2013)

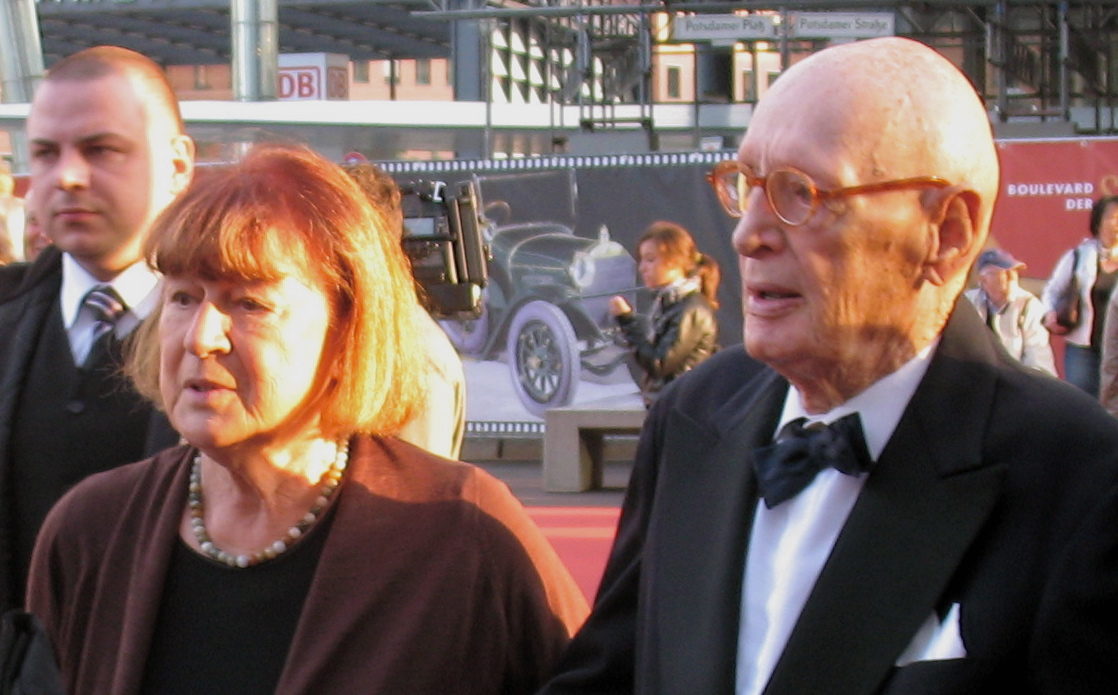
Wolfgang Menge with spouse Marlies, 2010 in Berlin

Wolfgang Menge (10 April 1924 – 17 October 2012) was a German television writer and journalist.

== Personal life ==
He was married and had three sons.

== Filmography ==
- 1958–1968: Stahlnetz (TV series), episodes:
  - Mordfall Oberhausen (1958)
  - Bankraub in Köln (1958)
  - Die blaue Mütze (1958)
  - Die Tote im Hafenbecken (1958)
  - Das zwölfte Messer (1958)
  - Sechs unter Verdacht (1958)
  - Treffpunkt Bahnhof Zoo (1959)
  - Das Alibi (1959)
  - Aktenzeichen: Welcker u. a. wegen Mordes (1959)
  - Die Zeugin im grünen Rock (1960)
  - Verbrannte Spuren (1960)
  - E ... 605 (1960)
  - Saison (1961)
  - In der Nacht zum Dienstag ... (1961)
  - In jeder Stadt … (1962)
  - Spur 211 (1962)
  - Das Haus an der Stör (1963)
  - Rehe (1964)
  - Strandkorb 421 (1964)
  - Nacht zum Ostersonntag (1965)
  - Ein Toter zuviel (1968)
- 1959: Strafbataillon 999
- 1959: For Love and Others
- 1960: The Crimson Circle
- 1961: The Green Archer
- 1961: Man in the Shadows
- 1963: Der Sittlichkeitsverbrecher
- 1964: Eines schönen Tages (TV film)
- 1964: Zeitvertreib (TV film)
- 1964: Polizeirevier Davidswache
- 1965: Die Katze im Sack (TV film)
- 1965: Verhör am Nachmittag (TV film)
- 1966: Begründung eines Urteils (TV film)
- 1967: Siedlung Arkadien (TV film)
- 1968: Der Partyphotograph
- 1968: Der deutsche Meister (TV film)
- 1968: I'm an Elephant, Madame
- 1969: Rebellion of the Lost (TV miniseries)
- 1969: Fragestunde (TV film)
- 1969: Die Dubrow-Krise (TV film)
- 1970: Das Millionenspiel (TV film)
- 1970: Sessel zwischen den Stühlen (TV film)
- 1971: Tatort: Kressin und der tote Mann im Fleet (TV series episode)
- 1971: Tatort: Kressin und der Laster nach Lüttich (TV series episode)
- 1971: Tatort: Kressin stoppt den Nordexpress (TV series episode)
- 1972: Tatort: Kennwort Fähre (TV series episode)
- 1972: Tatort: Kressin und der Mann mit dem gelben Koffer (TV series episode)
- 1973: Tatort: Stuttgarter Blüten (TV series episode)
- 1973: Smog (TV film)
- 1973–1976: Ein Herz und eine Seele (TV series, 25 episodes)
- 1974: Tatort: Gefährliche Wanzen (TV series episode)
- 1975: Nonstop Nonsens (TV series)
- 1976: Vier gegen die Bank (TV film)
- 1977: Planübung (TV film)
- 1978: Grüß Gott, ich komm von drüben (TV film)
- 1979: Zimmer frei – UNO-Nähe (TV series)
- 1979: Was wären wir ohne uns (TV series)
- 1980: Liebe ist doof (TV series)
- 1980: The Dream House
- 1980: Ein Mann von gestern (TV film)
- 1984: So lebten sie alle Tage (TV series, 5 episodes)
- 1986: Unternehmen Köpenick (TV series)
- 1986: Kennwort Möwe (TV film)
- 1987: Reichshauptstadt – privat (TV film)
- 1990: Baldur Blauzahn (TV series)
- 1991: Ende der Unschuld (TV film)
- 1993: Motzki (TV series)
- 1995: Spreebogen (TV film)
- 1998: Das Lied zum Sonntag (TV series)
- 2001: Kelly Bastian – Geschichte einer Hoffnung (TV film)

Literature: Book: Ganz einfach – chinesisch in der Rowohlt Reihe: Koche froh mit rororo, 1968, 580-ISBN 3 499 16411 6
