= Klaus Michael Grüber =

German theatre director and actor (1941–2008)

- Born: 4 June 1941; Neckarelz, Nazi Germany
- Died: 22 June 2008 (aged 67); Belle Île, France
- Occupation: Theatre director
- Years active: 1967–2005

Klaus Michael Grüber (4 June 1941 – 22 June 2008) was a German theatre director and actor. As an actor, he played Hans in Les Amants du Pont-Neuf. He was known for his inventive use of space and sound.

== Awards ==
- Konrad Wolf Prize (2000)
