= Christoph Marthaler =

Swiss director and musician

- Born: 17 October 1951 (age 75); Zurich
- Occupations: Theatre and opera director
- Website: https://christophmarthaler.ch/

Christoph Marthaler (17 October 1951) is a Swiss director and musician.

== Biography ==
Born in Zurich, Marthaler initially studied music (recorder and oboe). At the end of the 1960s, he attended Jacques Lecoq's theatre school in Paris. Back in Switzerland, he worked as a theatre musician and composer at Zurich's Theater am Neumarkt. This was followed by compositions for numerous productions at German-speaking theatres. In the following years, Marthaler established himself in the off-theatre scene with various projects. From 1988 to 1993, he worked continuously at the Theater Basel, where he developed several staged song recitals.

In 1993 he moved to the Deutsches Schauspielhaus in Hamburg with theatre director Frank Baumbauer. In 2000 Marthaler took over as artistic director of the Schauspielhaus Zürich, leaving in 2004. In the following years, he directed plays and operas for some of the most prestigious venues in Switzerland and Europe, including the Paris Opera, the Bayreuth Festival and Madrid's Teatro Real.

In 2015, Marthaler was honored with the Golden Lion at the Venice Biennale, and in 2018 he received the International Ibsen Award.

== Awards ==
- 1992: Culture Prize of the Canton of Basel-Country
- 1996: Konrad Wolf Prize of Academy of Arts, Berlin
- 1998: Europe Theatre Prize
- 1999: Ubu Award to the Best Foreign Show performed in Italy for Stunde Null oder die Kunst des Servierens
- 2004: recognition medal of the City of Zurich for special cultural achievements
- 2005: Nestroy Theatre Prize to the Best director for Protection from the Future
- 2006: Ubu Award to the Best Foreign Show performed in Italy for Winch Only from L'incoronazione di Poppea by Claudio Monteverdi
- 2009: Cultural Prize of the Canton of Zurich
- 2011: Hans Reinhart Ring
- 2014: Ubu Award for Best Foreign Show performed in Italy for Glaube, Liebe, Hoffnung by Ödön von Horváth
- 2015: Golden Lion of the Venice Biennale (Biennale Teatro)
- 2015: Ubu Award for Best Foreign Show performed in Italy for Das Weisse vom Ei/Une île flottante from Eugène Labiche
- 2018: International Ibsen Award

== Performances ==
- 1980: Zurich Theatre Spectacle, Rote Fabrik: Christoph Marthaler – Indeed. An interior
- 1983: Zurich: Christoph Marthaler after Erik Satie – Blanc et immobile
- 1985: Minimal Festival Zurich: Christoph Marthaler after Erik Satie – Vexations
- 1985: Zurich: Christoph Marthaler – Big words anthem. An Impromptu for choir, orchestra, six important men and a stowaway.
- 1988: Zurich Playhouse: Kurt Schwitters – Ribble Bobble Pimlico
- 1988: Theater Basel: Christoph Marthaler / Barbara Mundel – arrival Badischer Bahnhof
- 1989: Theater Basel: Christoph Marthaler – When the Alpine Mind Reddens, Kill, Free Swiss, Kill
- 1990: Theater Basel: Christoph Marthaler – Stägeli uf, Stägeli off juhee!
- 1991: Theater Basel: Eugène Labiche – The affair Rue de Lourcine
- 1992 Schlotterbeck Garage Basel: – Amora
- 1992: Theater Basel: Christoph Marthaler after Fernando Pessoa – Faust. A subjective tragedy
- 1992: Theater Basel: Samuel Beckett – A piece of monologue / Still no longer
- 1993: Volksbühne Berlin: Christoph Marthaler – Murx the Europeans! Murx him! Murx him! Murx him! Murx it off! (Invitation to the Berliner Theatertreffen)
- 1993: Theater Basel: Christoph Marthaler – ProHelvetia
- 1993: Deutsches Schauspielhaus Hamburg: Christoph Marthaler by Johann Wolfgang von Goethe – Goethe's Faust Root 1 + 2 (Invitation to the Berliner Theatertreffen)
- 1994: Oper Frankfurt: Claude Debussy – Pelléas et Mélisande
- 1994 Volksbühne Berlin: Christoph Marthaler by William Shakespeare – storm before Shakespeare – le petit Rien
- 1994: Deutsches Schauspielhaus, Hamburg: Christoph Marthaler – Addiction / pleasure
- 1994 Volksbühne Berlin: Christoph Marthaler by Karl Valentin and Maurice Maeterlinck – The intruder – an anniversary concert in two acts
- 1995: Deutsches Schauspielhaus Hamburg: Christoph Marthaler / Stefanie Carp – Zero Hour or the Art of serving (Invitation to the Berliner Theatertreffen)
- 1995: Deutsches Schauspielhaus Hamburg: Elias Canetti – wedding
- 1996: Salzburg Festival: Arnold Schoenberg / Messiaen – Pierrot Lunaire / Quatuor pour la fin du temps
- 1996: Deutsches Schauspielhaus Hamburg: Ödön von Horváth – Kasimir and Karoline (Invitation to the Berliner Theatertreffen)
- 1996: World in Basel and Volksbühne Berlin: Christoph Marthaler – Lina Böglis travel (Invitation to the Berliner Theatertreffen)
- 1996: Volksbühne Berlin: Christoph Marthaler – Street of the Best. A tour
- 1996: Oper Frankfurt: Giuseppe Verdi – Luisa Miller
- 1996: Opéra La Monnaie, Brussels: Klaas de Vries by Virginia Woolf and Fernando Pessoa – A King, Riding
- 1996: International Music Festival in Lucerne: Michael Jarrell for Christa Wolf – Cassandra director Christoph Marthaler and Anne Bennent
- 1997: Theater Basel: Christoph Marthaler / Jürg Henneberger – The Unanswered Question (Invitation to the Berliner Theatertreffen)
- 1997: Volksbühne Berlin: Anton Chekhov – Three Sisters
- 1997: Oper Frankfurt: Ludwig van Beethoven – Fidelio
- 1998: German Schauspielhaus Hamburg: Joseph Kesselring – Arsenic and Old Lace
- 1998: Volksbühne Berlin: Jacques Offenbach – La Vie Parisienne
- 1998: Salzburg Festival: Leoš Janáček – Katya Kabanova
- 1999: Deutsches Schauspielhaus Hamburg: Christoph Marthaler – Specialists. A survival tea dance
- 1999: Salzburg Festival: Ödön von Horváth – Beautiful View
- 2000: Theater Basel: Christoph Marthaler / Anna Viebrock / Jürg Henneberger – 20th Century Blues
- 2000: Schauspielhaus Zurich: Christoph Marthaler – Hotel anxiety
- 2001: Schauspielhaus Zurich: William Shakespeare – Twelfth (Invitation to the Berliner Theatertreffen)
- 2001: Schauspielhaus Zurich: Christoph Marthaler by Franz Schubert – The Beautiful Miller (Invitation to the Berliner Theatertreffen)
- 2001: Salzburg Festival: Wolfgang Amadeus Mozart – Le nozze di Figaro
- 2001: Volksbühne Berlin: Christoph Marthaler after Raffaele Viviani – The Ten Commandments
- 2002: Schauspielhaus Zurich: Thomas Hürlimann – synchro
- 2002: Münchner Kammerspiele: Elfriede Jelinek – In the Alps
- 2003: Schauspielhaus Zurich: Christoph Marthaler – Groundings (Invitation to the Berliner Theatertreffen)
- 2003: Schauspielhaus Zurich: Georg Büchner – Danton's Death (Invitation to the Berliner Theatertreffen)
- 2003: Volksbühne Berlin: Christoph Marthaler after Herman Melville – Better not. A thinning
- 2003: Schauspielhaus Zurich: Christoph Marthaler after Ovid – The Golden Age , with Stefan Pucher and Meg Stuart
- 2003: Opera Zurich / Zurich Schauspielhaus: Beat Furrer – Invocation
- 2004: Schauspielhaus Zurich: Christoph Marthaler – T.D.C. A replacement Passion (Invitation to the Berliner Theatertreffen)
- 2004: Nederlands Toneel (NT) Gent: Christoph Marthaler after Herman Heijermans – shanties
- 2005: Vienna Festival: Christoph Marthaler / Stefanie Carp – Protection from the Future (Invitation to the Berliner Theatertreffen, Nestroy Theatre Prize for Best Director)
- 2005: Donaueschingen Festival: Beat Furrer – FAMA. Sound theater for large ensemble, eight voices, actress and sound building
- 2005: Bayreuth Festival: Richard Wagner – Tristan und Isolde
- 2005: Volksbühne Berlin: Christoph Marthaler – The fruit fly
- 2006: KunstenfestivaldesArts Brussels: Christoph Marthaler – Winch only (Premio Ubu, Italy)
- 2006: Volksbühne Berlin: Ödön von Horváth – Tales from the Vienna Woods
- 2007: Nederlands Theatre (NT) Gent / Toneelgroep Amsterdam: Christoph Marthaler – Maeterlinck
- 2007: Opéra national de Paris: Giuseppe Verdi – La traviata
- 2007: Salzburg Festival / Ruhr Triennale: Christoph Marthaler – Sauser from Italy. A Urheberei
- 2007: Rote Fabrik Zurich: Christoph Marthaler – lack of space (Invitation to the Berliner Theatertreffen)
- 2008: Opéra national de Paris: Alban Berg – Wozzeck
- 2008: Hotel Waldhaus Sils-Maria: Christoph Marthaler – The theater with the Waldhaus (Invitation to the Berliner Theatertreffen)
- 2008: Centre culturel suisse de Paris: Christoph Marthaler – Lorem Ipsum Dolor: carte blanche à Christoph Marthaler
- 2009: Vienna Festival: Christoph Marthaler and Anna Viebrock – Riesenbutzbach. A permanent colony. (Invitation to the Berliner Theatertreffen)
- 2009: Theater Basel: Jacques Offenbach – La Grande-Duchesse de Gérolstein
- 2010: Theater Basel: Beat Furrer – Wüstenbuch
- 2010: Festival d'Avignon: Christoph Marthaler and Anna Viebrock – Nonsense
- 2010: Theater Basel: My fair lady – a language laboratory
- 2011: Katuaq Nuuk / Vienna Festival. + – 0 A subpolar basecamp , musical Greenland project; UA 12 May 2011
- 2011: Salzburg Festival: Leoš Janáček – The Makropulos
- 2011: Theater Basel: Christoph Marthaler, Malte Ubenauf, Bendix Dethleffsen – Lo stimolatore cardiaco
- 2012: Volksbühne Berlin / Vienna Festival: Ödön von Horváth – GlaubeLiebeHoffnung
- 2012: Zurich Opera House: Christoph Marthaler, Anna Viebrock, Laurence Cummings, Malte Ubenauf – Sale
- 2013: Acting Cologne: Sasha Rau – Oh it's like home
- 2013: Theater Basel: Christoph Marthaler, Malte Ubenauf, Bendix Dethleffsen – king. An enharmonic
- 2013: Vienna Festival: Christoph Marthaler, Uli Fussenegger – Last Days. An eve
- 2013: Theater Basel: Christoph Marthaler / Eugene Labuche – Das Weisse from egg (Une ile flottante)
- 2014: Deutsches Schauspielhaus Hamburg: Christoph Marthaler, Anna Viebrock, Malte Ubenauf – homesickness & Crime
- 2014: Teatro Real Madrid: Jacques Offenbach – Les contes d'Hoffmann
- 2014: Volksbühne Berlin: Christoph Marthaler, Anna Viebrock, Malte Ubenauf – Tessa Blomstedt does not give up
- 2015: Deutsches Schauspielhaus Hamburg: John Osborne – The Entertainer
- 2015: Theater Basel / Hamburg State Opera: Christoph Marthaler – Isolde 'supper'
- 2015: Zurich Opera House: G. Rossini – Il Viaggio A Reims
- 2016: Volksbühne Berlin: Christoph Marthaler – Hallelujah (A Reserve)
