= Theater der Welt =

World theatre festival in Germany

Theater der Welt (Theatre of the World) is an international theatre festival in Germany initiated by the International Theatre Institute. The main objective is to present theatre productions from all over the world. It became triennial in 1993 and takes place each time in a different city with a different artistic director.

== Editions ==
- 1981 Cologne
- 1985 Frankfurt am Main
- 1987 Stuttgart
- 1989 Hamburg
- 1991 Essen
- 1993 Munich
- 1996 Dresden
- 1999 Berlin
- 2002 Cologne, Bonn, Düsseldorf, Duisburg
- 2005 Stuttgart
- 2008 Halle (Saale)
- 2010 Essen and Mülheim an der Ruhr
- 2014 Mannheim
- 2017 Hamburg
- 2021 Düsseldorf
