= St. Pauli Church (Hamburg) =

Lutheran church in Hamburg, Germany

St. Pauli
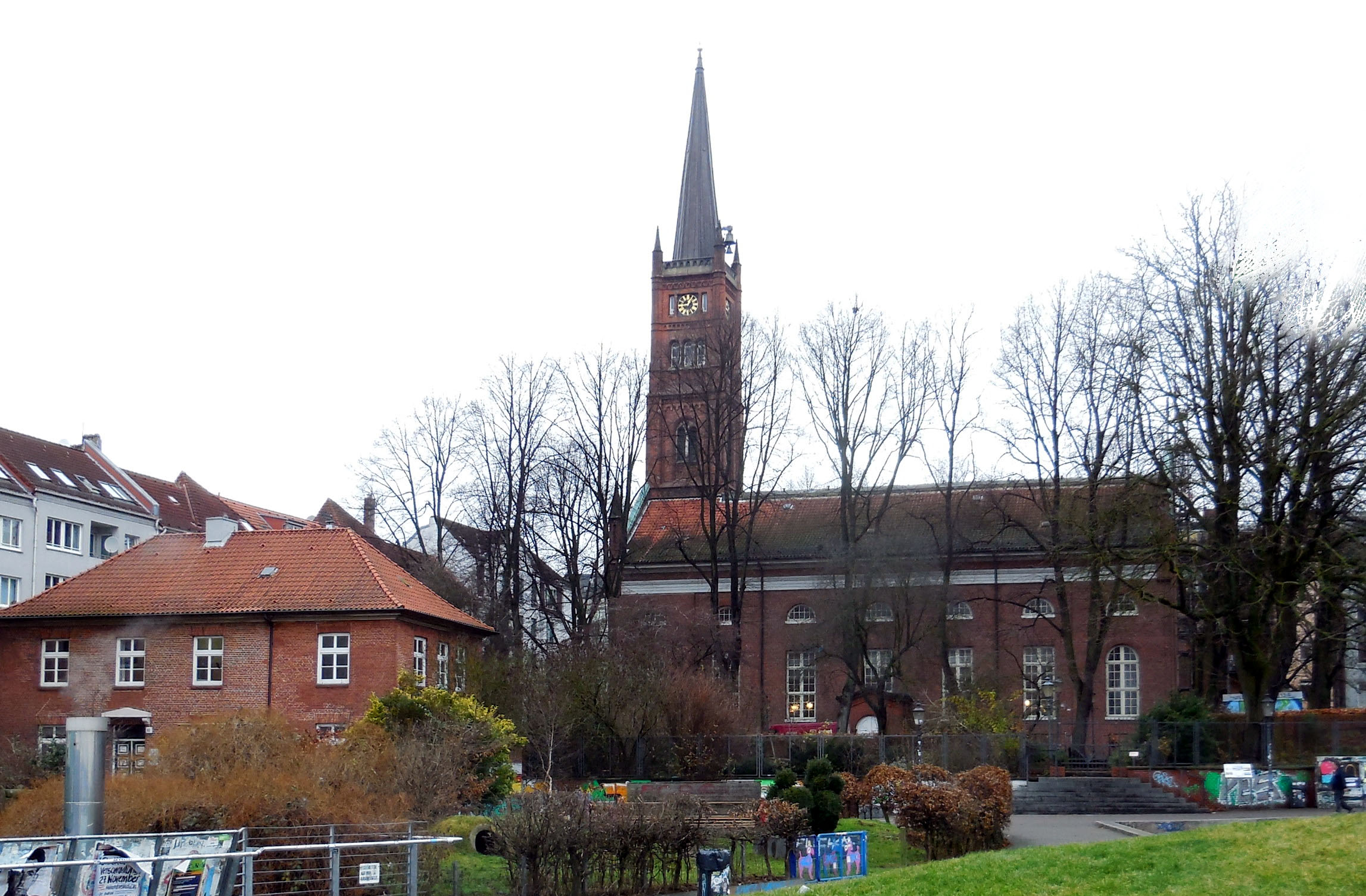
- St. Pauli Church in 2016
- St. Pauli
- 53°32′49″N 9°57′23″E
- Location: Hamburg-Altona
- Country: Germany
- Denomination: Evangelical Lutheran Church in Northern Germany

History
- Consecrated: 1820

St. Pauli is a church and congregation of the Evangelical Lutheran Church in Northern Germany in Hamburg-Altona, Germany. The church was built from 1819 on the site of an older church that was destroyed by the French. It retains a crucifix and a baptismal font from the late 17th century of the former church. The tower was not built until 1864. The congregation of about 5,000 forms an important part of the local community. In recent years, the church temporarily became a shelter for refugees.

== History ==
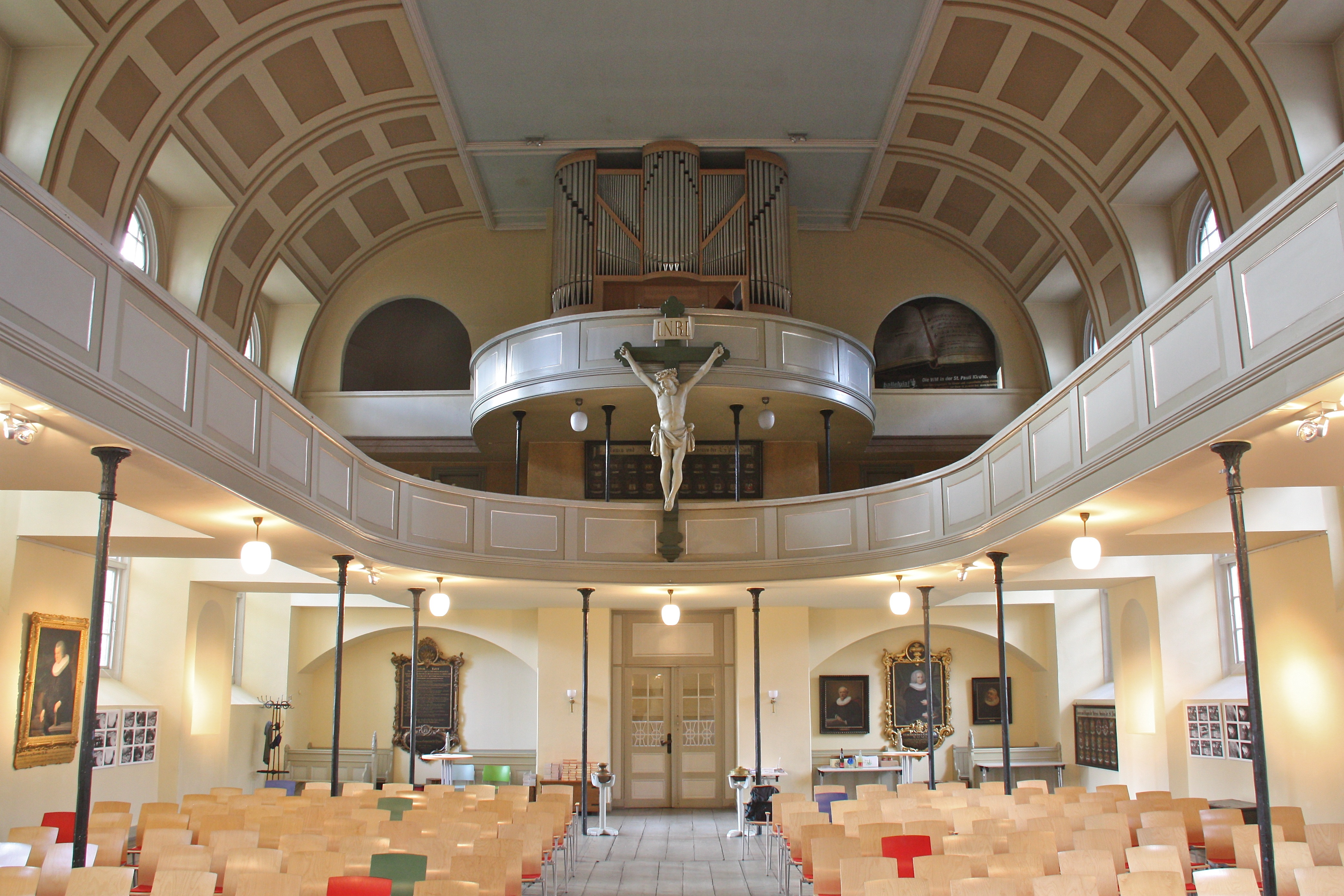
Interior view toward back, facing the organ and a 17th-century crucifix

In 1814, a church on the same site was burned down by the French during the Siege of Hamburg during the War of the Sixth Coalition against Napoleon. Over 400 houses were burned, too. Though the building was destroyed, the church's crucifix, which was from 1690, and the baptismal font from 1693 were able to be saved and used in the new church.

Carl Ludwig Wenner, the first director of city planning for Hamburg, was responsible for the building. On May 16, 1819, the foundation stone was laid, and the completed church was consecrated on March 20, 1820. The interior of the main building was built in a neoclassical style which resembled a Greek temple. Instead of the massive columns that were originally planned, fine iron columns were donated by area metalworkers. The gallery supported by these columns seems to float. The church sits on a hill and overlooks the Elbe River. In 1864, the neo-Gothic/neo-Romanesque tower, designed by Max Wallenstein, was added to the church.

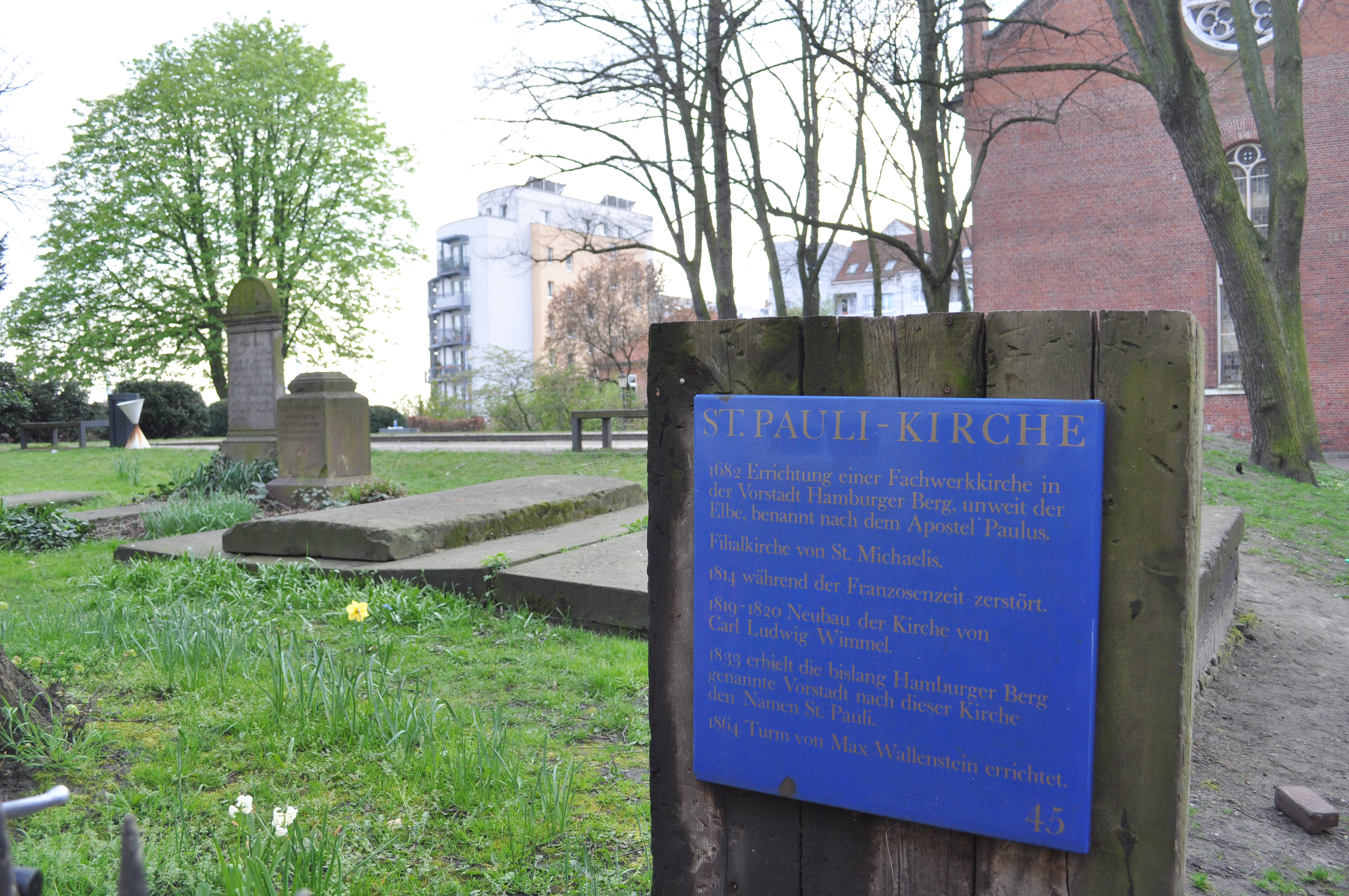
Church's graveyard and informational plaque

St. Pauli, a quarter in the city of Hamburg, was named after this church and its namesake, the biblical Saint Paul, in 1833. The internal boundaries of Hamburg were changed during the Nazi era so that St. Pauli church was no longer part of St. Pauli district. To this day, the church is part of the Altstadt-Altona district. In 1980, the Monument Protection Office oversaw a restoration of the inside of the main building, including repainting it to its original color scheme with ochre walls and a light blue ceiling. Although the interior of the church was once furnished with heavy benches, these have been replaced with movable chairs, allowing for a more multi-function space.

=== Modern parish ===
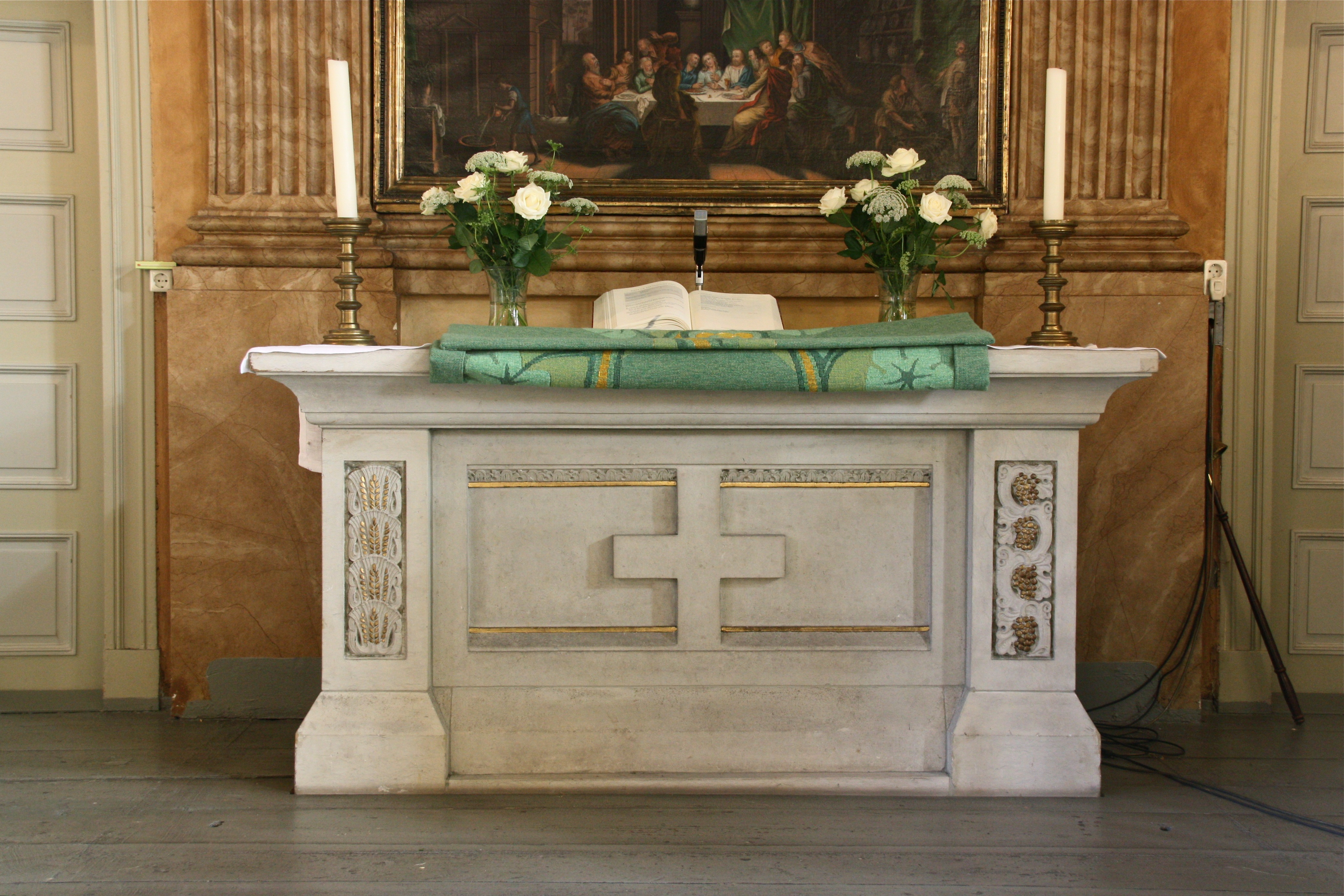
Altar from the Gnadenkirche

The congregation of the church is about 5,000 and is an important part of the surrounding community of 25,000 drawn from the areas of St. Pauli, Shanzenviertel and Karoviertel. The church is part of the Hamburg-East church district which is in turn part of the Evangelical Lutheran Church in Northern Germany. The sandstone altar from another Lutheran church in the area, previously called the Gnadenkirche, was moved to St. Pauli when Gnadenkirche became a Russian Orthodox church called the Church of St. John of Kronstadt.

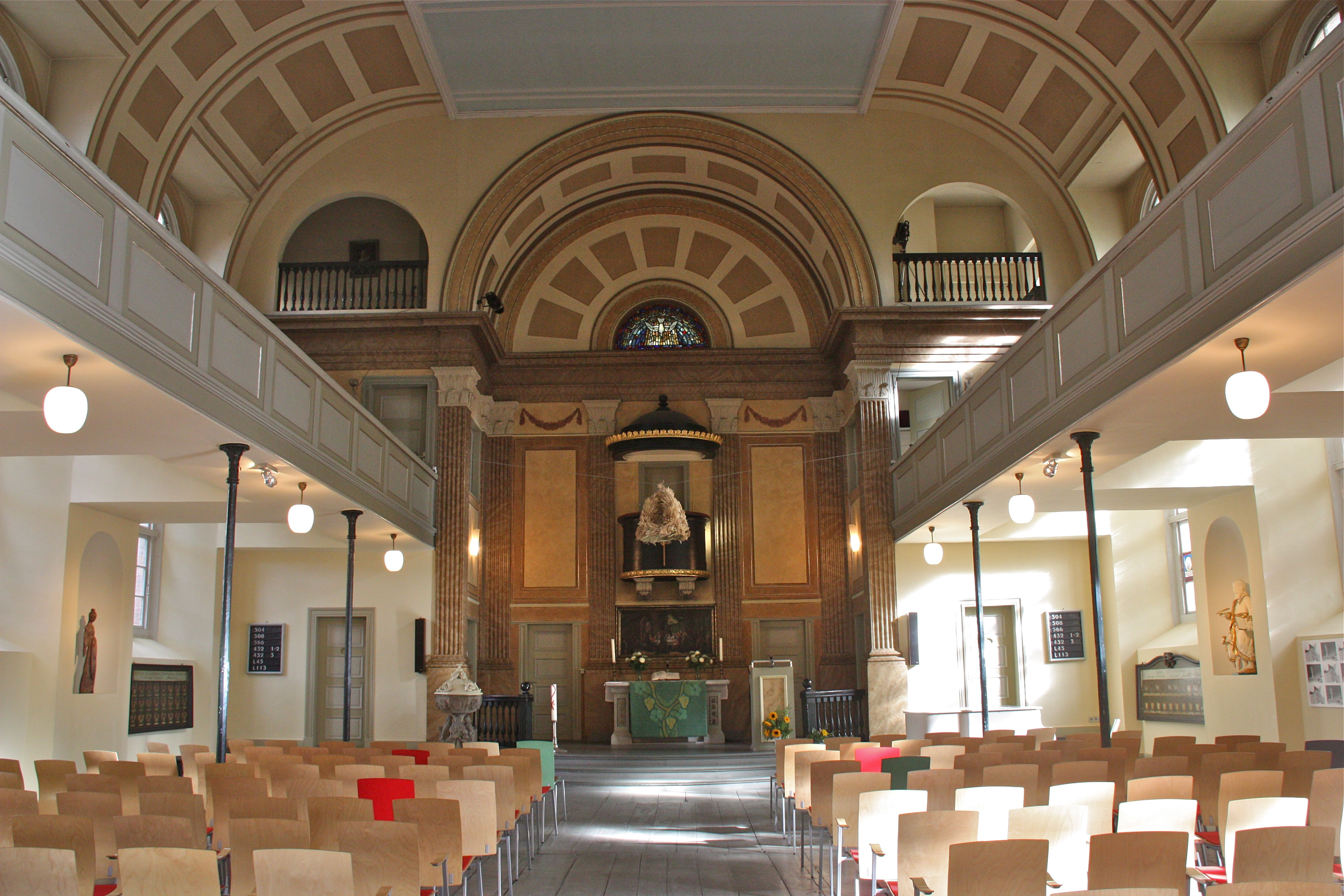
Interior, facing the altar

In 2019, the church's tower was renovated in preparation for a variety of events to be held marking the church's 200th anniversary in 2020. Overall, the price of the renovation was planned at 361,000 Euros. Half of this was covered by the federal government, which habitually gives partial funding to the restoration of religious monuments. The Hamburg monument protection agency planned to spend 39,000 Euros. The German monument protection agency pledged 25,000 Euros and the foundation for the preservation of church monuments in Germany pledged 10,000 Euros. The congregation planned to raise 50,000 Euros on its own and raise the rest in donations. The church planned to gain these donations through its fundraising drive, which, when translated, is called "Heaven, heaven, moss, moss." In exchange for larger donations, contributors can receive honey from the church garden. Art-history themed tours of the church are also available as an incentive for donations. The restoration included replacing many bricks, renovating sandstone work, repair-work for windows and renovating the clock faces.

=== Lampedusa refugees ===
In June 2013, Pastor Sieghard Wilm of St. Pauli invited a group of refugees into his church for what he thought would be a stay of only a couple nights. The church provided temporary living quarters for 80 male refugees from a group of 300 men who had traveled to Hamburg after living on Lampedusa, where they had fled after leaving Libya. Many had already fled as refugees to Libya, only to leave because of war as well as racial violence against Black Africans living in that country. After their temporary Schengen visas expired, it was decided that the men were living in Germany illegally. Therefore, they had to spend most of their time on the church grounds, which provided some protection from police checks. They slept in the church or in temporary houses on the church grounds.

They ultimately stayed for several months, until the Evangelical Lutheran Church in Northern Germany worked out a deal with the city government. The 300 refugees in the city were allowed the chance to apply for legal residency individually. Although this fell short of the legal residency for the entire group that the refugees sought, it was regarded as the best deal that Bishop Kirsten Fehrs could negotiate under the circumstances. Of 120 refugees who studied German, started jobs, and applied, about 100 were granted residency. The cause of the Lampedusa in Hamburg has continued to draw attention in more recent years and the deal between Hamburg and the Lampedusa refugees is thought to be unique.
