= Die Ratten =

1955 film

- Theatrical poster
- Directed by: Robert Siodmak
- Written by: Jochen Huth
- Starring: Maria Schell; Curd Jürgens; Heidemarie Hatheyer; Gustav Knuth; Ilse Steppat
- Release date: 6 July 1955
- Running time: 97 minutes
- Country: West Germany
- Language: German

Die Ratten (The Rats) is a 1955 West German drama film directed by Robert Siodmak. It is an adaptation of the 1911 play The Rats by Gerhart Hauptmann, but sets the story in the early 1950s, shortly after the Second World War.

The film won the Golden Bear award, the first German film to win.

It was shot at the Spandau Studios in Berlin. The film's sets were designed by the art directors Hans Jürgen Kiebach and Rolf Zehetbauer.

== Synopsis ==
Pauline, a destitute Polish woman, sells her illegitimate baby for a few hundred Deutsche Mark to the childless Anna John.

== Cast ==
- Maria Schell – Pauline Karka
- Curd Jürgens – Bruno Mechelke
- Heidemarie Hatheyer – Anna John
- Gustav Knuth – Karl John
- Ilse Steppat – Frau Knobbe
- Fritz Rémond – Harro Hassenreuter
- Barbara Rost – Selma Knobbe
- Hans Bergmann
- Walter Bluhm
- Carl de Vogt
- Erich Dunskus
- Karl Hellmer
- Manfred Meurer
- Edith Schollwer
- Lou Seitz
- Hans Stiebner
