= Achim Freyer =

German stage director, set designer and painter

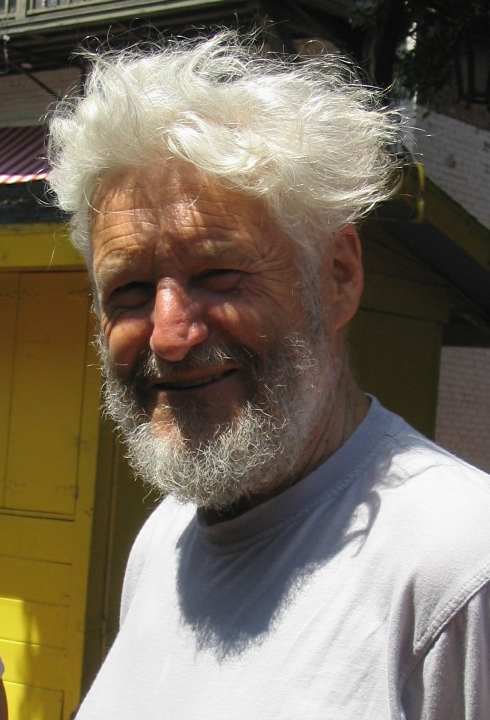
Achim Freyer

Achim Freyer (German: [ˈaxɪm ˈfʁaɪɐ]; born 30 March 1934) is a German stage director, set designer and painter. A protégé of Bertolt Brecht, Freyer has become one of the world's leading opera directors, working throughout Europe and, since 2002, in the United States, principally with the Los Angeles Opera. Since 1992, Freyer has developed a number of productions featuring his own troupe of performers, known as the Freyer Ensemble.

Freyer staged a controversial production of Wagner's Ring Cycle in Los Angeles in 2010, praised by many critics but criticised by some of its own stars.

== Awards ==
- 1987: Kainz-Medaille of Vienna
- 1990: Order of Merit of the Federal Republic of Germany
- 2000: Bayerischer Theaterpreis
- 2005: Ehrenmedaille der Bundeshauptstadt Wien
- 2007: Hein-Heckroth-Bühnenbildpreis
- 2015: Nestroy Theatre Prize for his life's work
- 2016: Der Faust in the category Bühne/Kostüm (stage/costume) for Esame di mezzanotte, Nationaltheater Mannheim
- 2022: Der Faust, lifetime achievement
