= Akademietheater =

Theatre in Vienna

Coordinates: 48.200434°N 16.377519°E

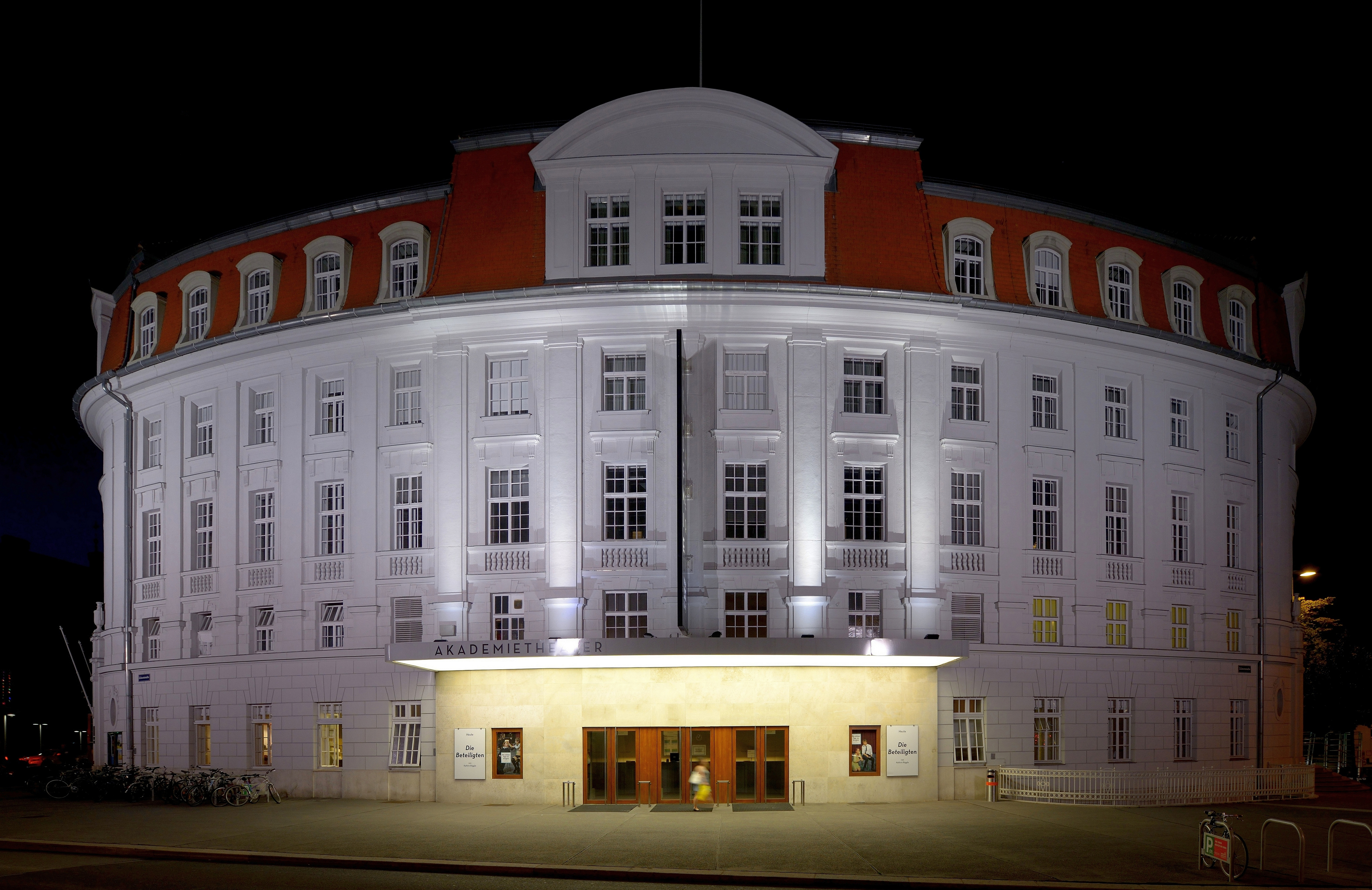
The Akademietheater at night.

The Akademietheater in Vienna, Austria, is the smaller of two performance halls of the Burgtheater organization. It was constructed in the years 1911 to 1913 by architects Fellner & Helmer and is considered today part of Austria's Federal Theatres (Bundestheater). Located on Lisztstrasse, in Vienna's third district, it is attached to its neighboring building, the Konzerthaus, a well-known performance venue for concerts.
