= Theater heute =

German-language monthly theatre magazine

- Logo
- Categories: Theatre magazine
- Frequency: Monthly
- Publisher: Friedrich Berlin Verlag GmbH
- Founder: Erhard Friedrich; Henning Rischbieter
- Founded: 1960; 65 years ago
- First issue: Summer 1960
- Country: Germany
- Based in: Berlin
- Language: German
- Website: Theater heute
- ISSN: 0040-5507
- OCLC: 1773450

Theater heute (German: Theatre Today) is a German language monthly magazine with a special focus on theatre. The magazine is based in Berlin, Germany, and has been in circulation since 1960.

== History and profile ==
Theater heute was founded in 1960. The first issue appeared in Summer of that year, and its founders were Erhard Friedrich und Henning Rischbieter. The magazine is published on a monthly basis by Friedrich Berlin Verlag GmbH based in Berlin. It features articles on theater performances in Germany and in other countries. It is one of the German publications which extensively published reviews about the work by Samuel Beckett and also, the German translations of his plays.

The cofounder of the magazine, Henning von Rischbieter, was also its founding editor-in-chief. Peter von Becker also served as the editor-in-chief of Theater heute in the late 1980s.
