= Berliner Theatertreffen =

Annual theatre festival in Berlin, Germany

Coordinates: 52°29′53″N 13°19′47″E

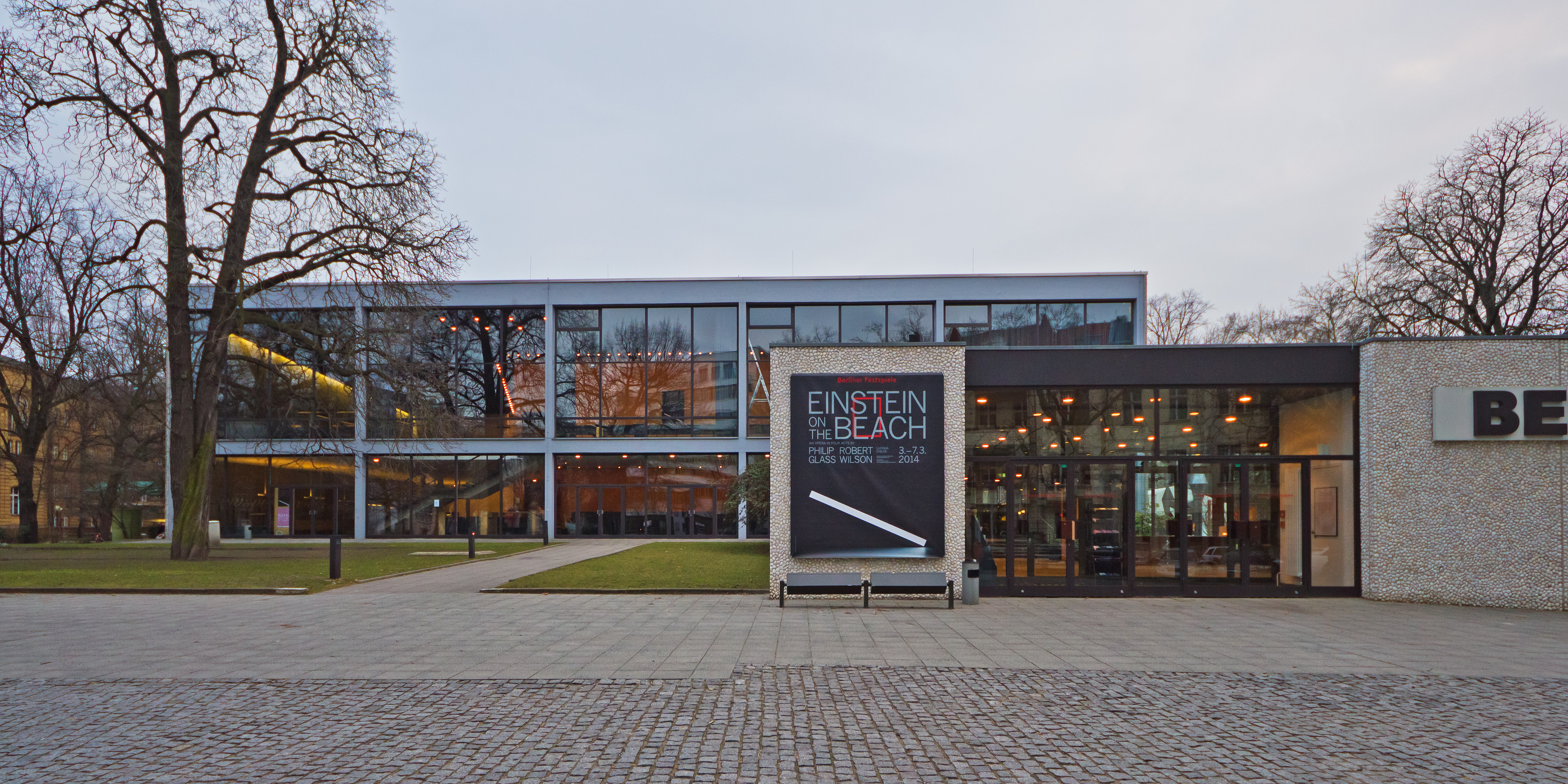
House of Berliner Festspiele

The Berliner Theatertreffen ("Berlin theatre meeting") is a two-week long theatre festival occurring yearly in May in Berlin, Germany. It is organised by the Berliner Festspiele corporation, funded by the Federal Cultural Foundation of Germany.

During the festival, those ten theatre productions within the German-speaking region that have premiered in the previous season and have been voted most noteworthy by the festival jury of seven drama critics are presented on various stages in Berlin.

Other festival events have come to include award ceremonies, Q&A and panel discussions, films, and concerts.

The central building of the Berliner Festspiele corporation, the Haus der Berliner Festspiele, is located at Schaperstraße 24, 10719 Berlin.
