= Botho Strauss bibliography =

Botho Strauss (born 2 December 1944) is a German playwright, novelist and essayist.

== Works in German ==
Strauss is the author of the following works.

- Marlenes Schwester, two novellas (1975) ISBN 978-3-446-12011-2
- Schützenehre, novella (1975) ISBN 978-3-87365-071-8
- Trilogie des Wiedersehens, play (1976) ISBN 978-3-446-12269-7
- Die Widmung, novella (1977) ISBN 978-3-446-12415-8
- Groß und klein, scenes (1978) ISBN 978-3-446-12598-8
- Die Hypochonder; Bekannte Gesichter, gemischte Gefühle, two plays (1979) ISBN 978-3-446-12817-0
- Rumor (1980) ISBN 978-3-446-12990-0
- Paare, Passanten 2nd ed. (1981) ISBN 978-3-446-13450-8
- Kalldewey, Farce (1981) ISBN 978-3-446-13477-5
- Der Park, play (1983) ISBN 978-3-446-13772-1 loosely based on Shakespeare's A Midsummer Night's Dream
- Tumult translated by Michael Hulse (1984) ISBN 978-0-85635-472-4
- Der junge Mann (1984) ISBN 978-3-446-14134-6
- Diese Erinnerung an einen, der nur einen Tag zu Gast war, poem (1985) ISBN 978-3-446-14396-8
- Die Fremdenführerin, play in two acts (1986) ISBN 978-3-446-14497-2 (pbk.)
- Niemand anderes 2nd ed. (1987) ISBN 978-3-446-14890-1
- Versuch, ästhetische und politische Ereignisse zusammenzudenken, texts on theatre 1967–1986 (1987) ISBN 978-3-88661-080-8
- Besucher, three plays (1988) ISBN 978-3-446-15257-1
- Fragmente der Undeutlichkeit (1989) ISBN 978-3-446-15736-1
- Kongress: die Kette der Demütigungen (1989)
- Angelas Kleider: Nachtstück in zwei Teilen (1991) ISBN 978-3-446-16434-5
- Schlusschor, three acts (1991) ISBN 978-3-446-16218-1
- Beginnlosigkeit: Reflexionen über Fleck und Linie (1992) ISBN 978-3-446-17112-1
- Das Gleichgewicht play in three acts (1993) ISBN 978-3-446-17498-6
- Wohnen, dämmern, lügen (1994) ISBN 978-3-446-17875-5
- Ithaka, play after the homecoming cantos of the Odyssey (1996) ISBN 978-3-446-18577-7
- Die Fehler des Kopisten (1997) ISBN 978-3-446-19029-0
- Die Ähnlichen: moral Interludes; Der Kuss des Vergessens: Vivarium rot, two plays (1998) ISBN 978-3-446-19292-8
- Jeffers – Akt I und II (1998) ISBN 978-3-446-19528-8
- Der Gebärdensammler, texts on theatre, edited by Thomas Oberender (1999) ISBN 978-3-88661-217-8
- Gedankenfluchten (1999) ISBN 978-3-518-22326-0
- Das Partikular (2000) ISBN 978-3-446-19886-9
- Der Narr und seine Frau heute abend in Pancomedia (2001) ISBN 978-3-446-20087-6
- Unerwartete Rückkehr (2002) ISBN 978-3-446-20254-2
- Die Nacht mit Alice, als Julia ums Haus schlich (2003) ISBN 978-3-446-20357-0
- Der Untenstehende auf Zehenspitzen (2004) ISBN 978-3-446-20491-1
- Die eine und die andere, play in two acts (2005) ISBN 978-3-446-20620-5 (pbk.)
- Schändung after Shakespeare's Titus Andronicus (2005) ISBN 978-3-446-20626-7 (pbk.)
- Mikado (2006) ISBN 978-3-446-20808-7
- Botho Strauß / Neo Rauch: Der Mittler, Münster 2006, ISBN 978-3-930754-44-1
- Leichtes Spiel (2009)
- Das blinde Geschehen (2011)
- Die Unbeholfenen. Bewußtseinsnovelle (2007) ISBN 978-3-446-20917-6
- Vom Aufenthalt (2009) ISBN 978-3-446-23441-3
- Sie/Er (2012) ISBN 978-3-446-23865-7
- Die Fabeln von der Begegnung (2013) ISBN 978-3-446-24180-0
- Lichter des Toren. Der Idiot und seine Zeit (2013) ISBN 978-3-424-35088-3
- Der zurück in sein Haus gestopfte Jäger (2014) ISBN 978-3-499-26755-0
- Herkunft (2014) ISBN 978-3-446-24676-8
- Allein mit allen. Gedankenbuch (2014) ISBN 978-3-446-24608-9
- Oniritti Höhlenbilder (2016) ISBN 978-3-446-25402-2
- Der Fortführer (2018)

== English translations ==
- Drama Contemporary. Germany: plays by Botho Strauss et al.; edited by Carl Weber. (1996) ISBN 978-0-8018-5279-4 (alk. paper) ISBN 978-0-8018-5280-0 (pbk., alk. paper)
- West Coast Plays 8: Edited by Rick Foster (1981) ISBN 0934782075, 9780934782074 Mathuen Drama, 1981.
- Big and Little, scenes, translated by Anne Cattaneo (1979) ISBN 978-0-374-11254-7
- Big and Small, translated by Martin Crimp (2011)
  A Sydney Theatre Company production, co-commissioned by the Barbican Centre, London 2012 Festival, Théâtre de la Ville, Paris, Vienna Festival and Ruhrfestspiele Recklinghausen; Cate Blanchett as Lotte.
- Couples, Passersby translated by Roslyn Theobald (1996) ISBN 978-0-8101-1242-1 (alk. paper)
- Devotion translated by Sophie Wilkins (1995) ISBN 978-0-8101-1342-8 (pbk., alk. paper)
- Living, Glimmering, Lying translated by Roslyn Theobald (1999) ISBN 978-0-8101-1283-4 (alk. paper)
- The Park translated by Tinch Minter and Anthony Vivis, Sheffield Academic Press (1988) ISBN 978-1-85075-188-5
- The Young Man translated by Roslyn Theobald (1995) ISBN 978-0-8101-1338-1 (alk. paper)
- Three Plays (The Park, Seven Doors, Time and the Room) translated by Jeremy Sams, Oberon, 2006 ISBN 978-1-84002-476-0
