= Insane (disambiguation) =

Insane behavior, or insanity, is characterized by abnormal mental or behavioral patterns.

Insane may also refer to:

== Music ==
- Insane (album) or the title song, by Syron Vanes, 2003
- "Insane" (Black Gryph0n and Baasik song), 2021
- "Insane" (Korn song), 2016
- "Insane" (Texas song), 1998
- "Insane", a song by BtoB from Born to Beat, 2012
- "Insane", a song by Cold from Cold, 1998
- "Insane", a song by Eminem from Relapse, 2009
- "Insane", a song by Post Malone from Twelve Carat Toothache, 2022
- "Insane", a song by Scars on Broadway from Scars on Broadway, 2008

== Video games ==
- Insane (2000 video game), an off-road racing game
- Insane (cancelled video game), a cancelled survival horror game

== Other uses ==
- Insane (film), a 2016 South Korean film
- Insane (novel), a 1983 novel by Rainald Goetz
- Insane (Gröna Lund), a roller coaster at Gröna Lund amusement park in Stockholm
- INSANE (software), an animation engine developed at LucasArts

== See also ==
- Insanity (disambiguation)
