= Alfred Kirchner =

German actor, theatre director and theatre manager

- Born: 22 May 1937 (age 88); Göppingen, Germany
- Education: Max-Reinhardt-Schule für Schauspiel
- Occupations: Actor; Stage director; Opera director; Theatre manager; Academic teacher
- Organizations: Theater Bremen; Schauspielhaus Bochum; Burgtheater; Staatliche Schauspielbühnen Berlin; University of Georgia; Musikhochschule Hamburg; Hochschule für Musik "Hanns Eisler"

Alfred Kirchner (born 22 May 1937) is a German actor, theatre director (especially for opera) and theatre manager who is based in Berlin. He worked at theatres such as Theater Bremen, Schauspielhaus Bochum, the Burgtheater in Vienna and the Staatliche Schauspielbühnen Berlin, before turning to freelance work. He has staged productions in Europe and North America, including several world premieres of both drama and opera. He directed the premiere of Martin Walser's Ein Kinderspiel in Stuttgart in 1971, the U.S. premiere of Henze's We Come to the River at the Santa Fe Opera in 1984, and the premiere of Hans Zender's Stephen Climax at the Oper Frankfurt in 1986. In 1994, he staged Wagner's Der Ring des Nibelungen at the Bayreuth Festival.

== Life ==
Kirchner was born in Göppingen, the son of a Schriftleiter. He was trained as an actor at the Max-Reinhardt-Schule für Schauspiel in Berlin. He first worked as an actor and assistant stage director (Regieassistent) at the Theater Kiel. At the Theater Bremen from 1964 to 1971, he first assisted Peter Zadek and Peter Palitzsch. Kirchner is married; the couple have two daughters and live in Berlin and Stuttgart.

== Career ==
Kirchner's first theatre staging was Hall/Waterhouse's Lügen-Billy in Bremen in 1965. He worked at the Schauspielhaus Bochum with Hans Schalla. From 1972 to 1979, he led the drama section of the Staatstheater Stuttgart as Oberspielleiter. From 1974, he was a member of the board of directors there, together with Claus Peymann. He staged as a guest at international theatres, opera houses and festivals, including New York City, the Wiener Festwochen, the Holland Festival in Amsterdam and the Mülheimer Theatertage. In 1979, he and other members of the Stuttgart theatre moved with Peymann to Bochum. When Peymann moved again to the Burgtheater in Vienna in 1986, Kirchner followed. From 1989/90, he tried with Vera Sturm, Alexander Lang and Volkmar Clauß (called the Viererbande) to rescue the Staatliche Schauspielbühnen Berlin, which closed in 1993.

Kirchner then worked as a freelance opera director, including the Oper Frankfurt, Leipzig Opera, Vienna State Opera and Hamburg State Opera. He participated at Berliner Theatertreffen several times. He also staged operas internationally, in Zürich, Barcelona, Oslo, Moscow, Strasbourg, Montpellier, Toulouse, Oviedo, Dallas, Santiago de Chile and often at the Santa Fe Opera, including the U.S. premieres of Henze's We Come to the River and Venus and Adonis. In 1994, he staged Wagner's Der Ring des Nibelungen at the Bayreuth Festival.

Kirchner collaborated with conductors such as Michael Gielen, Claudio Abbado, Nikolaus Harnoncourt, James Levine, Gerd Albrecht, Paolo Carignani, Graeme Jenkins, Dennis Russell Davies and Bertrand de Billy. Besides classical repertoire in drama and opera, he focused on contemporary works. He staged world premieres of playwrights such as Martin Walser, Peter Turrini, Heiner Müller, Herbert Achternbusch, Dario Fo, Maxim Gorki and Gerlind Reinshagen and composers such as Helmut Lachenmann, Hans Zender and Udo Zimmermann.

Kirchner taught at the University of Georgia, the Musikhochschule Hamburg, Hamburg University, and the Hochschule für Musik "Hanns Eisler".

== Productions ==
- Ein Kinderspiel by Martin Walser, Stuttgart 1971, world premiere
- Die kahle Sängerin, Stuttgart 1974
- Das Sauspiel by Walser, with music by Mikis Theodorakis, Schauspielhaus Hamburg 1976, world premiere
- Sonntagskinder by Gerlind Reinshagen, Stuttgart 1976, world premiere
- Der Entaklemmer by Thaddäus Troll after Molière's L'Avare, Stuttgart 1976, world premiere
- Jenůfa, conductor Michael Gielen, Oper Frankfurt 1979
- Die Soldaten, Gielen, Oper Frankfurt 1980
- Die wundersame Schustersfrau by Udo Zimmermann, Schwetzingen Festival 1982, world premiere
- Die Heilige Johanna der Schlachthöfe, Bochum 1980, Amsterdam 1981
- Mutter Courage und ihre Kinder, Bochum 1981
- Über allen Gipfeln ist Ruh by Thomas Bernhard, Bochum 1981, world premiere at the Ludwigsburg Festival
- Johann Georg Elser by Peter-Paul Zahl, Bochum 1982, world premiere
- Ein Maskenball, Oper Frankfurt 1982
- Nachtwache by Lars Norén, Bochum 1982, German premiere
- Wolokolamsker Chaussee I by Heiner Müller, Bochum 1983, West German premiere
- We Come to the River by Henze, conductor Dennis Russell Davies, Santa Fe Opera 1984, U.S. premiere
- Eugen Onegin, Oper Frankfurt 1984
- Stephen Climax by Hans Zender, Oper Frankfurt 1986, world premiere
- An der Donau by Herbert Achternbusch, Akademietheater 1987, world premiere
- Die Minderleister by Peter Turrini, Akademietheater 1987, world premiere, also at the Mülheimer Theatertage
- Don Giovanni, conductor Nikolaus Harnoncourt, Amsterdam 1988
- Khovanshchina, conductor Claudio Abbado, Vienna State Opera 1989
- Faust, Berlin 1990
- Idomeneo, Hamburg State Opera 1990
- Der Ring des Nibelungen, conductor James Levine, Bayreuth Festival 1994 to 1998
- Der Freischütz, Vienna 1995
- Die Nase by Shostakovich, Oper Leipzig 1997
- Tosca, Oper Frankfurt 1998
- Die Zauberflöte, Oper Frankfurt 1998
- Manon Lescaut, Oper Frankfurt 1999
- Venus and Adonis by Henze, Santa Fe Opera 2000, U.S. premiere
- Tristan und Isolde, conductor Simon Rattle, Amsterdam 2001
- Tristan und Isolde, conductor De Billy, Barcelona 2002
- Das Wundertheater by Henze after Miguel de Cervantes, Montepulciano 2006, for the composer's 80th birthday
- Lohengrin, conductor Graeme Jenkins, Dallas Opera 2007
- Tristan und Isolde, conductor Ingo Metzmacher, Amsterdam 2008
- Don Giovanni, Magdeburg and Oviedo 2009
- Tosca, Volksoper Vienna 2009
- Die lustigen Weiber von Windsor, Vienna 2010 and Tokyo 2012
- Hermann und Dorothea, Burgtheater 2016, also Berliner Ensemble and Ruhrfestspiele 2017

== Publications ==
Alfred Kirchner: Der Mann von Pölarölara. Autobiografische Splitter. Vienna: Hollitzer 2019 ISBN 978-3-99012-627-1.
