= Adrian Nathan West =

American writer and translator

Adrian Nathan West is an American writer, critic, and translator. He has published the novel-essay The Aesthetics of Degradation (2016) and the novel My Father’s Diet (2022).

== Biography ==
West is a literary translator from several languages, primarily Spanish, German, Catalan, and French. He is known for his translation of When We Cease to Understand the World, by Chilean author Benjamín Labatut, which was supported by an award from English PEN, shortlisted for the International Booker Prize, and the National Book Award for Translated Literature, and also selected by Barack Obama for his annual Summer Reading List in 2021. He has also received the Austrian Cultural Forum's Translation Prize in 2017 for his translation of Josef Winkler's The Abduction and the Spain-USA Foundation Translation Award in 2024 for his translation of Open Heart by Elvira Lindo. He is the English-language translator of Swiss author Hermann Burger.

In 2022, he was recognized for his exceptional contributions to literature with an Arts and Letters Award from the American Academy of Arts and Letters.

== Personal life ==
West lives between Spain and the United States with the cinema critic Beatriz Leal Riesco. He is a brown belt in Brazilian jiu-jitsu.

== Bibliography ==
=== As author ===
- The Aesthetics of Degradation. Repeater Books. 2016. ISBN 978-1-913505-22-6.
- My Father's Diet. And Other Stories. 2022. ISBN 978-1-913505-22-6.

=== As translator ===
- Winkler, Josef (2013). When the Time Comes. Contra Mundum Press. ISBN 978-1-68137-566-3.
- Fritz, Marianne (2015). The Weight of Things. Dorothy. ISBN 978-0-9897607-7-5.
- Winkler, Josef (2015). Graveyard of Bitter Oranges. Contra Mundum Press.
- Gimferrer, Pere (2016). Fortuny. David R. Godine.
- Benet, Juan (2017). The Construction of the Tower of Babel. Wakefield Press.
- Goetz, Rainald (2017). Insane. Fitzcarraldo Editions. ISBN 978-1-913505-22-6.
- Lange, Hartmut (2017). Positive Nihilism: My Confrontation with Heidegger. MIT Press.
- Zepeda Patterson, Jorge (2017). Milena, or the Most Beautiful Femur in the World. Restless Books. ISBN 978-1-63206-125-6.
- Améry, Jean (2018). Charles Bovary, Country Doctor. New York Review Books. ISBN 978-1-68137-250-1.
- Lacan, Sibylle (2019). A Father: Puzzle. MIT Press. ISBN 978-0-262-03931-4.
- Ferrari, K. (2020). Like Flies From Afar. Farrar, Straus, and Giroux. ISBN 978-0-374-23994-7.
- Goetz, Rainald (2020). Rave. Fitzcarraldo.
- Labatut, Benjamín (2020). When We Cease to Understand the World. Pushkin.
- Vargas Llosa, Mario (2021). Harsh Times. Farrar, Straus, and Giroux. ISBN 978-0-374-60123-2.
- Neruda, Pablo (2021). The Complete Memoirs: Expanded Edition. Translated with Hardie St. Martin. Farrar, Straus and Giroux. ISBN 978-0-374-53812-5.
- Pàmies, Sergi (2021). The Art of Wearing a Trench Coat. Other Press.
- Burger, Hermann (2022). Brenner. Archipelago Books. ISBN 978-1-953861-30-6.
- Burger, Hermann (2022). Tractatus Logico-Suicidalis. Wakefield Press.
- Vargas Llosa, Mario (2022). Fonchito and the Moon. Illustrated by Marta Chicote Juiz. Kales Press. ISBN 979-8-9859558-0-4.
- Carpentier, Alejo (2023). Explosion in the Cathedral. Penguin Classics.
- Carpentier, Alejo (2023). The Lost Steps. Penguin Classics.
- Gurt, Carlota (2023). Alone. Europa Editions.
- Ron, Mercedes (2023). Your Fault. Bloom Books. ISBN 978-1-728-29076-8.
- de Palol, Miquel (2023). The Garden of Seven Twilights. Dalkey Archive Press. ISBN 978-1-628974-51-5.
- Burger, Hermann (2025). Diabelli. Wakefield Press.
- Hernández, Miguel Ángel (2025). Anoxia. Other Press. ISBN 978-1-63542-458-4.
- Mattioli, Massimo (2025). Joe Galaxy. Translated with Jamie Richards. Fantagraphics.
- Vargas Llosa, Mario (2023, translated/1st American Edition 2026). I Give You My Silence ISBN 978-0-374-61625-0
