= Dea Loher =

German playwright and author (born 1964)

- Dea Loher
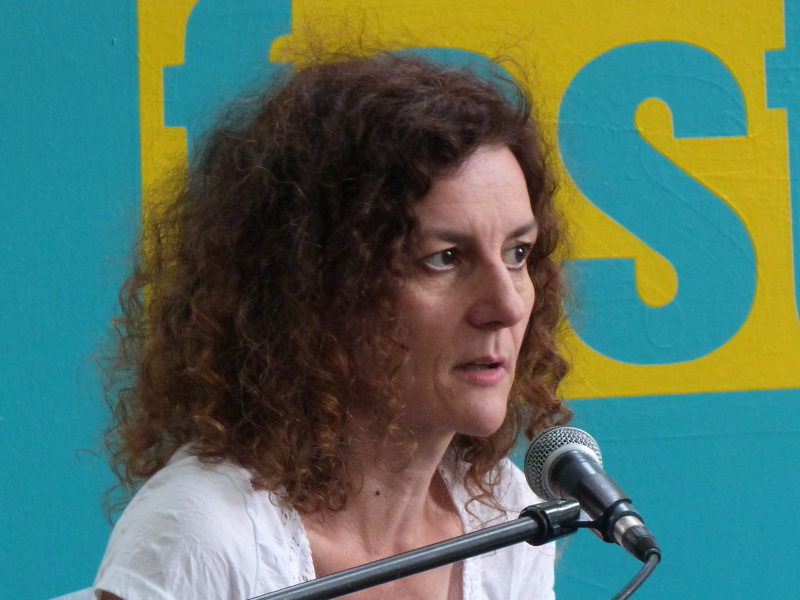
- Loher at the 2012 Erlanger Poetenfest
- Born: Andrea Beate Loher; 1964 (age 61–62); Traunstein, Germany
- Education: Berlin University of the Arts
- Occupations: Playwright, author
- Writing career
- Pen name: Dea Loher
- Language: German
- Genre: Drama

Dea Loher (born 1964) is a German playwright and author.

== Biography ==
Dea Loher was born Andrea Beate Loher in 1964 in Traunstein, Bavaria, Germany. She initially used the first name Dea as a pen name, but eventually changed her name officially to Dea. She studied German literature and philosophy at LMU Munich. She then spent a year in Brazil. In 1990, she began studying creative writing for the stage with Heiner Müller and Yaak Karsunke at the Berlin University of the Arts. Her first plays premiered in the early 1990s, and she gained recognition as one of the most important young playwrights of her time in Germany. Dea Loher has since been awarded major prizes for drama and literature in Germany, including the Joseph-Breitbach-Preis.

== Works ==
=== Dramas ===
- Tätowierung (Premiere at the Ensemble Theater am Südstern, Berlin, 1992)
- Olgas Raum (Olga's Room) (Premiere at the Ernst Deutsch Theater, Hamburg, 1992)
- Leviathan (Premiere at the Niedersächsisches Staatstheater, Hanover, 1993)
- Fremdes Haus (Premiere at the Niedersächsisches Staatstheater, Hanover, 1995)
- Adam Geist (Premiere at the Niedersächsisches Staatstheater, Hanover, 1998)
- Blaubart - Hoffnung der Frauen (Premiere at the Bayerisches Staatsschauspiel München, Munich, 1997)
- Manhattan Medea (Premiere at steirischer herbst, 1999)
- Berliner Geschichte (Premiere at the Niedersächsisches Staatstheater, Hanover, 2000)
- Klaras Verhältnisse (Premiere at the Burgtheater, Vienna, 2000)
- Der dritte Sektor (Premiere at the Thalia Theater, Hamburg, 2001)
- Magazin des Glücks (Premiered at the Thalia Theater, Hamburg, 2001-2002)
- Unschuld (Premiere at the Thalia Theater, Hamburg, 2003)
- Das Leben auf der Praca Roosevelt (Premiere at the Thalia Theater, Hamburg, 2004)
- Quixote in der Stadt (Premiere at the Thalia Theater, Hamburg, 2005)
- Land ohne Worte (Premiere at the Münchner Kammerspiele, Munich, 2007)
- Das letzte Feuer (Premiere at the Thalia Theater, Hamburg, 2008)
- Diebe (Premiere at the Deutsches Theater, Berlin, 2010)
- Am Schwarzen See (Premiere at the Deutsches Theater, Berlin, 2012)

=== Libretto ===
- Licht. Opera. Music by Wolfgang Böhmer (Premiere at the Neuköllner Oper, Berlin, 2004)

=== Prose ===
- Hundskopf (Göttingen: Wallstein Verlag, 2005)
- Bugatti taucht auf (Göttingen: Wallstein Verlag, 2012)

== Awards ==
- 1990 Playwrights Prize awarded by the Hamburger Volksbühne for Olgas Raum
- 1992 Royal Court Theatre Playwrights Award
- 1993 Stücke-Förderpreis awarded by the Goethe Institute (for Tätowierung in Friderike Vielstich's production at the Theater Oberhausen)
- 1993 Frankfurter Autorenstiftung Prize (Frankfurt Author Foundation)
- 1993 Chosen as "Nachwuchsdramatikerin des Jahres" (Young Playwright of the Year) by the German publication Theater heute
- 1994 Chosen as "Nachwuchsdramatikerin des Jahres" (Young Playwright of the Year) by the German publication Theater heute
- 1995 Schiller Memorial Prize
- 1997 Jakob-Michael-Reinhold-Lenz Prize for Drama (forAdam Geist)
- 1997 Gerrit-Engelke Prize
- 1998 Mülheimer Dramatikerpreis (for Adam Geist)
- 2005 Else Lasker-Schüler Dramatist Prize
- 2006 Bertolt Brecht Literature Prize
- 2008 Mülheimer Dramatikerpreis (for Das letzte Feuer)
- 2008 Play of the Year for Das letzte Feuer by jury selection for the German publication Theater Heute
- 2009 Berlin Literature Prize
- 2009 Marieluise-Fleißer-Preis
- 2014/2015 Stadtschreiber von Bergen

== Secondary Literature ==
- Michael Börgerding: Auf der Suche nach den vielen Antworten. Über Dea Loher und ihre Stücke – eine persönliche Vergewisserung. In: Theater heute, 10, 2003, S. 42–46
- Michael Börgerding: Was erzählt die nackte Brust von Irmgard Möller im SPIEGEL. In: Groß, Khuon (Hrsg.): Dea Loher und das Schauspiel Hannover. S. 82–88
- Jean-Claude Francois: Dea Loher: Dramaturge de l'Allemagne nouvelle. In: Allemagne aujourd'hui, 160, 2002, S. 171–186
- Birte Giesler: Überall Täter: Geschlechterkritik in Dea Lohers „Blaubart – Hoffnung der Frauen". In: Forum Modernes Theater, Band 20:1, 2005, S. 77–95
- Jens Groß, Ulrich Khuon (Hrsg.): Dea Loher und das Schauspiel Hannover. Niedersächsisches Staatstheater Hannover, 1998
- Birgit Haas: Die Renaissance des dramatischen Dramas. In: Birgit Haas: Plädoyer für ein dramatisches Drama. Passagen Verlag, Wien 2007, S. 177–219
- Birgit Haas: Dea Loher. Vorstellung. In: Monatshefte, 99, 2007, S. 269–277
- Birgit Haas: Die Rekonstruktion der Dekonstruktion in Dea Lohers Dramen, oder: Die Rückkehr des politischen Dramas. In: Monatshefte, 99, 2007, S. 280–298
- Birgit Haas: Das Theater von Dea Loher: Brecht und (k)ein Ende. Aisthesis Verlag, Bielefeld 2006
- Birgit Haas (Hrsg.): Dea Loher. Special Issue. In: Monatshefte, 99, 2007
- Birgit Haas: Gender-Performanz und Macht. (Post)feministische Mythen bei Sarah Kane und Dea Loher. In: Birgit Haas (Hrsg.): Macht – Performanz, Performativität und Polittheater seit 1990. Königshausen & Neumann, Würzburg 2005, S. 197–227
- Birgit Haas: History Through the Lens of the Uncertainty Principle: Dea Loher's Leviathan. In: Journal of the M/MLA, 39:1, 2006, S. 73–88
- Birgit Haas: Sexual Abuse: Dea Loher's Tätowierung (1992). In: Birgit Haas: Modern German Political Drama 1980–2000. Camden House, New York 2003, S. 146–148
- Birgit Haas: The Rote Armee Fraktion: Dea Loher's Leviathan (1993). In: Birgit Haas: Modern German Political Drama 1980–2000. S. 170–173
- Ulrich Khuon: Das Spiel des Schreibens und seine Anstöße. Dea Loher und das Autorentheater in Hannover. In: Groß, Khuon (Hrsg.): Dea Loher und das Schauspiel Hannover. S. 9–14
- Nils Lehnert: Gesellschaftsrelevant, aber nicht offen ‚engagiert'. Zum didaktischen wie ästhetischen Potenzial von Dea Lohers Theatertexten Diebe (2010), Am Schwarzen See (2012) und Gaunerstück (2015). In: Marijana Jeleč (Hrsg.): Tendenzen der Gegenwartsliteratur. Literaturwissenschaftliche und literaturdidaktische Perspektiven. Peter Lang, Berlin 2019, S. 307–329.
- Sascha Löschner: Dea Loher: Verletzte Sprache. In: Stück-Werk 1. Internationales Theaterinstitut, Berlin 1997, S. 71–73
- Alexandra Ludewig: Dea Lohers Theaterstück Adam Geist. In: Forum Modernes Theater, 15, 2002, S. 113–124
- Alexandra Ludewig: Junges Theater im Deutschland der 1990er Jahre: Dea Lohers Adam Geist. In: New German Review, 1998, S. 55–73
- Malgorzata Sugiera: Beyond Drama: Writing for Postdramatic Theatre. In: Theatre Research International 1, 2004, S. 16–28
- Malgorzata Sugiera: Realne światy / Możliwe światy. Niemiecki dramat ostatniej dekady (1995–2004). Księgarnia Akademicka, Kraków 2005
- Sandra Umathum: Unglückliche Utopisten. In: Christel Weiler, Harald Müller (Hrsg.): Stück-Werk 3. Zentrum Bundesrepublik Deutschland des Internationalen Theaterinstituts, Berlin 2001, S. 101–105
- Birte Werner: Das Drama ist die Wirklichkeit. Theatertexte von Autorinnen der 1990er Jahre. Gesine Danckwart, Dea Loher, Theresia Walser. In: Der Deutschunterricht; Beiträge zu seiner Praxis und wissenschaftlichen Grundlegung, 58:4, 2006, S. 63–73
- Peter Yang: Dea Loher. In: The Literary Encyclopedia – 1(4.1: German-language Writing and Culture), 2017, litencyc.com
- Peter Yang: Innocence (Unschuld) by Dea Loher (2003). In: The Literary Encyclopedia – 1(4.1: German-language Writing and Culture), litencyc.com
