= The MANIAC =

2023 novel by Benjamín Labatut

- Author: Benjamín Labatut
- Language: English
- Publisher: Penguin Press
- Publication date: October 3, 2023
- Pages: 368
- ISBN: 9780593654477

The MANIAC is a 2023 novel by Chilean author Benjamín Labatut, written in English. It is a fictionalised biography of polymath John von Neumann, whom Labatut calls "the smartest human being of the 20th century". The book focuses on von Neumann, but is also about physicist Paul Ehrenfest, the history of artificial intelligence, and Lee Sedol's Go match against AlphaGo. The book received mostly positive reviews from critics.

== Background ==
John von Neumann was a Jewish Hungarian-born polymath who was a prodigy from an early childhood. Von Neumann worked in multiple fields of science, theoretical (mathematical foundations of quantum mechanics, game theory, cellular automata) and applied (nuclear weapons research during the Manhattan Project in World War II, computer architecture later named after him, and many other subjects). Labatut calls him "the smartest human being of the 20th century". The title of the book is derived from an early computer based on von Neumann architecture, built after the war at Los Alamos laboratory, called MANIAC I.

Benjamín Labatut is a Chilean author known for his 2020 book When We Cease to Understand the World, a collection of fictionalised stories about famous scientists that received positive reviews and was translated into multiple languages from Spanish.

The MANIAC is Labatut's first book written in English. In an interview, Labatut said he prefers to write in English:

English is my preferred form of thought. ... English is the language I do most if not all my reading it. And it is a far better language than Spanish, in so many ways. Writing "clean" prose in Spanish is almost impossible, because so many of its sounds clash. Borges said that he found English "a far finer language than Spanish" because it's both Germanic and Latin; because of its wonderful vocabulary ("Regal is not exactly the same thing as saying kingly," he explained); because of its physicality; and because you can do almost anything with verbs and prepositions.

Labatut was inspired to write The MANIAC by George Dyson's book Turing's Cathedral.

== Synopsis ==
The book has three chapters. The first chapter, "Paul or the Discovery of the Irrational", written in the third person, is about physicist Paul Ehrenfest. The chapter opens with Ehrenfest shooting dead his son Vassily, who suffered from Down syndrome, and then himself. It then recounts Ehrenfest's life story, describing his relationships with his wife Tatyana, his mistress Nelly Meyjes, and his eminent physicist colleagues. It chronicles his descent into despair and depression over his marriage's disintegration, the advent of quantum mechanics, and the direction Europe was heading in with the Nazi Party's rise to power in Germany, looping back to the initial scene of the chapter.

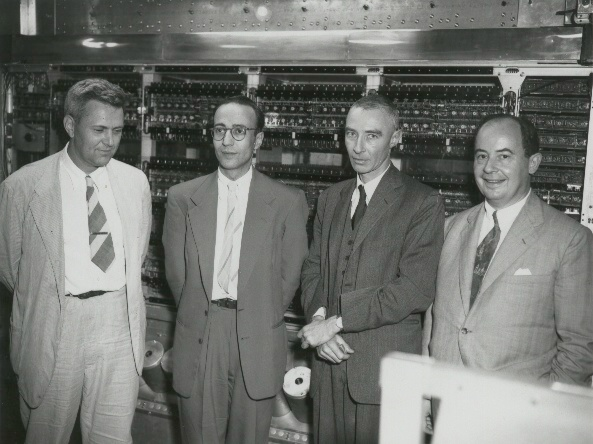
Julian Bigelow, Herman Goldstine, Robert Oppenheimer and John von Neumann in front of the IAS machine, built in Princeton (MANIAC I computer was a similar machine built at Los Alamos Laboratory.)

The second chapter, "John or the Mad Dreams of Reason", is about John von Neumann, and is written as a series of interviews of his family members, wives, friends, and colleagues, each in a distinctive voice. It is divided into three parts. Part I, "The Limits of Logic", is about his early life, as told by von Neumann's childhood friend Eugene Wigner, mother Margrit Kann, brother Nicholas von Neumann, first wife Mariette Kövesi, and scientists Theodore von Karman, George Polya, and Gábor Szegő. It climaxes with von Neumann's participation in David Hilbert's program to create a logical basis for mathematics based on a consistent set of axioms, a quest ultimately scuppered by Kurt Gödel.

Part II, "The Delicate Balance of Terror", discusses von Neumann's role in the Manhattan Project (as told by Richard Feynman); his development of game theory and the doctrine of mutual assured destruction (MAD) (as told by Oskar Morgenstern); and his creation of the MANIAC I computer and the von Neumann architecture (as told by Julian Bigelow).

In Part III, "Ghosts in the Machine", Sydney Brenner discusses von Neumann's contributions to biology, his theoretical work on self-replicating and self-repairing machines, and his vision of Von Neumann probes exploring the universe. Nils Aall Barricelli talks about his ideas of digital life and his disagreements with von Neumann. Von Neumann's second wife Klára Dán, daughter Marina, and Wigner talk about his final years, personal life, and death.

The third chapter, "Lee or The Delusions of Artificial Intelligence", is about Lee Sedol's Go match against AlphaGo. The narrative reverts to the third person. The chapter also tells the story of Demis Hassabis, a chess prodigy in childhood who decided to work on artificial intelligence and founded DeepMind, the company behind AlphaGo. The way is pointed to the future, as artificial intelligence's growing capabilities outpace the human mind. The book ends with Lee Sedol's retirement from Go, and new version of DeepMind's program, AlphaZero, that did not train on human games but nevertheless became the strongest player in Go, chess, and Shogi.

== Reception ==
I don't think there is a need to say the sky is coming down on us. It already did. I mean, there is nothing scarier than opening up your phone. If you're not having panic attacks about AI and climate change, then you haven't been paying attention. But facts can only take you so far. My work is obsessed with the void of unknowability. Books are incantations, they are spells. You spend years casting them, then people try and reduce them to a headline because they are looking at them with their forebrains, only thinking about what I'm trying to say.

— Benjamín Labatut

The book received mostly positive reviews. In his review for The New York Times Tom McCarthy noted the ambiguity of genre: "At its best, as in the stunning opening sequence reconstructing the murder-suicide of the physicist Paul Ehrenfest and his disabled son, or in the final section's gripping account of a computer defeating the world's best human Go player, you just throw up your hands and think, Who cares what discourse label we assign this stuff? It's great."

Becca Rothfeld of the Washington Post praised the book, writing that it is "Labatut's latest virtuosic effort, at once a historical novel and a philosophical foray": "The MANIAC is a work of dark, eerie and singular beauty." She noted that the book "can also be difficult to read" because of its unusual narrative structure: "The book is narrated by a cluttered polyphony of characters, among them both of von Neumann's wives and a number of his teachers and colleagues. ... Like von Neumann, The MANIAC strives to adopt the impartial standpoint of the universe."

Killian Fox of The Guardian sees the book as "darkly fascinating novel", and notes Labatut's "impressive dexterity, unpicking complex ideas in long, elegant sentences that propel us forward at speed (this is his first book written in English). Even in the more feverish passages, when yet another great mind succumbs to madness, haunted by the spectres they've helped unleash on the world, he feels in full control of his material."

Sam Byers of The Guardian praises the book and the author's style: "The opening chapter of Benjamín Labatut's second novel is such a perfect distillation of his technique that it could serve as a manifesto." and "Readers ... will recognise the sense of breathlessness his best writing can evoke. Seemingly loosened from the laws of physics they describe, his sentences range freely through time and space, connecting not only characters and events, but the delicate tissue of intellectual history, often with a lightness of touch that belies their underlying complexity." He writes on the narrative structure: "Through a cascade of staccato chapters, an ensemble of narrators offer their piecemeal insights." Byers adds that "a brilliant novel is not quite what we end up with" and sees the problem in the "diffusion": "Labatut simply spreads himself too thin. Too many years in too few pages; too many voices with far too little to distinguish them. Initially intriguing, the bite-size monologues quickly come to feel inadequate."

Some reviewers did not see the book as a biography. In an essay for the Cleveland Review of Books, Ben Cosman juxtaposes the book with Christopher Nolan's biopic Oppenheimer, and writes that it "follows the development of artificial intelligence—first as an idea at the beginning of the twentieth century, and then as a practicality at the beginning of the twenty-first—through the lives of three men who faced it." He also compared the book's structure to "witness testimony". Another reviewer called the book "perfect for anyone thirsting for more nuclear anxiety after watching Oppenheimer".

- Garrett Biggs of the Chicago Review of Books writes of the book's style: "Labatut writes about scientists the way Roberto Bolaño writes about poets. They are near mythical figures, captured at the corner of the novel's eye. They become historical in the most fraught sense of the term: subject to rumor and speculation and, eventually, the novel's form inflates their personas into something so large they can only be understood as narrative, never known in any objective capacity." Biggs criticises the last chapter: "the story of artificial intelligence has yet to be written. And so when Labatut's narration editorializes about artificial intelligence as 'a future that inspires hope and horror,' The MANIAC disassembles as a novel and starts to sound like a stale thinkpiece. AlphaGo might represent the first glimmer of a true artificial intelligence, as Labatut suggests. It also could one day be considered nothing more than a souped-up cousin to IBM's DeepBlue. We just don't know yet." But, Biggs writes, that doesn't "obscure Labatut's own brilliance. His prose is crisp, and he is able to render momentum where many writers might fail."

Ed Simon of the Los Angeles Review of Books sees the book not just as a biography of von Neumann, but as a history of artificial intelligence. Simon connects the story of AI and von Neumann to an old story of "manufactured men, from Rabbi Judah Loew ben Bezalel's golem to Mary Shelley's monster in Frankenstein ... humanity was haunted by the possibility of artificial intelligence before it ever existed". Simon notes von Neumann's obscurity:

If it's true that von Neumann was the most brilliant human of the last century, then he has ironically dwindled into popular obscurity (a lifelong fear of his), perhaps because, as a character, he lacks the doomed romanticism of a J. Robert Oppenheimer, the paranoiac madness of his friend and foil Kurt Gödel, or even the (studied) avuncular saintliness of an Albert Einstein. Far from being an otherworldly anchorite, von Neumann was a womanizer and a drinker, a gambler and a lover of luxury cars, closer to the military brass who gave him a dozen different security clearances to work at the Atomic Energy Commission, the Office of Scientific Research and Development, the Armed Forces Special Weapons Project, and so on, than he was to the genteel physicists of his Austro-Hungarian youth. Yet, as The MANIAC makes clear, von Neumann's was the animating spirit of our current technological epoch, an individual whose dogged work ethic and almost supernatural intelligence made our current moment possible.

Simon also sees in the book "Labatut's critique" of "the United States' antinomian rationalism, its instrumental, utilitarian, positivist, rapacious, anarchic logic that so often can appear as its exact opposite".

Other reviewers harshly criticised the book. Alun David of The Jewish Chronicle found it "clichéd ... in both thought and style".

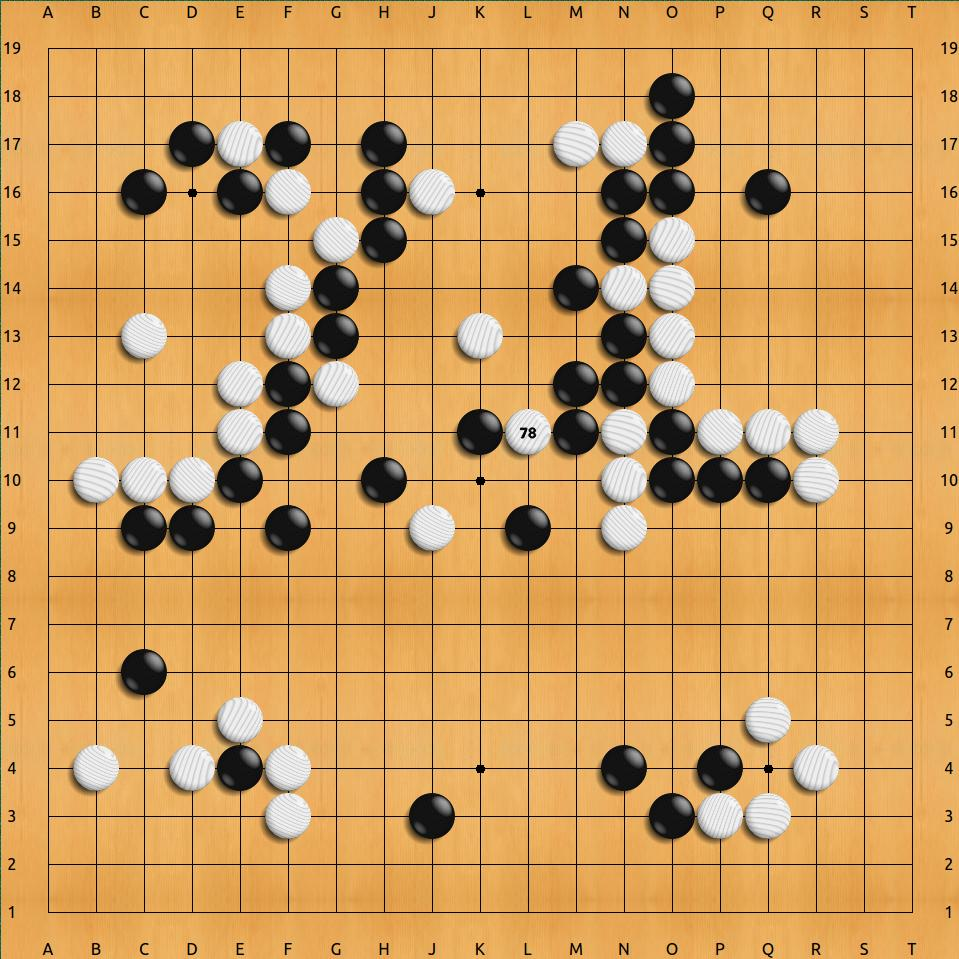
Lee Sedol's "divine move" in a match against AlphaGo

Multiple reviewers highlighted the last chapter, about Lee Sedol's match against AlphaGo. Rothfeld called it the book's "most extraordinary segment". Biggs finds that it "falls flat when compared to the first two parts of the triptych". Simon writes, "That the editors at Penguin were agreeable with Labatut's novel ending in an 84-page (admittedly riveting) synopsis of the strategies that underlie a complex 3,000-year-old Chinese game speaks to an admirable conception of what novels can do, the way that they can be pushed and can in turn push our conceptions."

As Labatut's first book was mostly fiction, several reviewers commented on The MANIAC's verifiability. Fox writes, "The details largely conform to what you'll read in the history books, but Labatut affords himself considerable latitude to imagine real lives from the inside." Byers calls it "a semi-fictional oral history"; Cosman writes, "Reading Labatut's nonfiction novels is an exercise in figuring out what is true, what isn't, and how much it matters either way." Simon writes, "The novel is ostensibly historical fiction ... but The MANIAC is actually something far rarer and more unusual—a bona fide experimental novel of ideas that has emerged from a publishing ecosystem that all too often only rewards dry literary fiction or lowest-common-denominator genre fiction. ... The MANIAC's genre is better understood as historical creative nonfiction, philosophical argument, or some conjunction of the two". Labatut himself calls his books "fiction", but says that "All the science ... is true. Yet everything a writer writes is fiction."
