= Nils Aall Barricelli =

Norwegian-Italian mathematician

- Born: 24 January 1912; Rome, Italy
- Died: 27 January 1993 (aged 81)
- Occupation: Mathematician

Nils Aall Barricelli (24 January 1912 – 27 January 1993) was a Norwegian-Italian mathematician.

== Biography ==
Nils Aall Barricelli was born on 24 January 1912, in Rome. When he was a student at the University of Rome, he "studied mathematics and physics under Enrico Fermi". In 1936 he moved to Norway with his divorced mother and sister. In 1946, he wrote a PhD thesis "on the statistical analysis of climate variation". He did not get a degree - his thesis had 500 pages, and the committee suggested that he shorten it. He declined and never completed his PhD. In 1951, he submitted an application for Fulbright Scholarship. He wrote a short biography in the application:

In 1932 I passed the Italian Artium examination (classical line), and in 1936 the Italian graduation in Mathematical and physical sciences. In 1936 I settled in Norway where I have been working with scientific researches in theoretical statistics and stationary time series ... [and the] mathematical theory of evolution. ... Since 1947 I have been Assistant Professor at the University of Oslo.

Ragnar Frisch, who later won Nobel Prize in Economics, wrote a letter recommending him to John von Neumann.

Barricelli's early computer-assisted experiments in symbiogenesis and evolution are considered pioneering in artificial life research. Barricelli, who was independently wealthy, held an unpaid residency at the Institute for Advanced Study in Princeton, New Jersey in 1953, 1954, and 1956. In Princeton, he worked with John von Neumann, by whom he was never academically recognised, nonetheless he worked at von Neumann's IAS machine.

George Dyson described Barricelli's first experiments at Princeton:

At 10:38 p.m. on March 3, 1953, in a one-story brick building at the end of Olden Lane in Princeton, New Jersey, Italian-Norwegian mathematical biologist Nils Aall Barricelli inoculated a 5-kilobyte digital universe with random numbers generated by drawing playing cards from a shuffled deck. "A series of numerical experiments are being made with the aim of verifying the possibility of an evolution similar to that of living organisms taking place in an artificially created universe," he announced.

He later worked at the University of California, Los Angeles, at Vanderbilt University (until 1964), in the Department of Genetics of the University of Washington, Seattle (until 1968) and then at the Mathematics Institute of the University of Oslo. Barricelli published in a variety of fields including virus genetics, DNA, theoretical biology, space flight, theoretical physics and mathematical language.

== Legacy ==
Barricelli is mostly forgotten, though he is sometimes called the "Father of Digital Life". He is recognised as a first person who programmed the first genetic algorithm, and published "perhaps the earliest published record of an evolutionary simulation" in 1954.

He is featured in George Dyson's books Turing's Cathedral and Darwin Among the Machines, and in Benjamin Labatut's novel The MANIAC.
