= Else Lasker-Schüler Dramatist Prize =

German literary award

Since 1993, the Else Lasker-Schüler Dramatist Prize (German: Else-Lasker-Schüler-Dramatikerpreis) has been awarded by the Pfalztheater Kaiserslautern on behalf of the Rhineland-Palatinate Foundation for Culture. The prize is named after expressionist poet Else Lasker-Schüler (1869–1945). It is endowed with €10,000, one of the most highly endowed playwright prizes in Germany. The award ceremony at the opening of the Theatertage Rheinland-Pfalz in the Pfalztheater or Staatstheater Mainz is carried out by the Prime Minister of Rhineland-Palatinate. Additionally the Stückepreis is awarded for promoting young talents.

== Recipients ==
- 1993 Kerstin Specht
- 1995 Harald Kislinger
- 1997 Volker Lüdecke and Werner Fritsch
- 1999 Rainald Goetz
- 2001 Einar Schleef (posthumous)
- 2003 Elfriede Jelinek
- 2005 Dea Loher
- 2008 Fritz Kater
- 2010 Roland Schimmelpfennig
- 2012 René Pollesch
- 2014 Peter Handke
- 2016 Sibylle Berg
- 2018 Ewald Palmetshofer
- 2020 Felicia Zeller
- 2022 Kathrin Röggla
- 2024 Wolfram Lotz
