= Reinshagen =

Reinshagen may refer to:

== People ==
- Gerlind Reinshagen (1926–2019), German writer

== Places in Germany ==
- a district of the town Remscheid in North Rhine-Westphalia
- a district of the municipality Lalendorf in the Landkreis Rostock in Mecklenburg-Vorpommern
- a district of the municipality Satow, Germany in the Landkreis Rostock in Mecklenburg-Vorpommern
- a district of the municipality Morsbach in the Oberbergischer Kreis in North Rhine-Westphalia
- a district of the municipality Much, Germany in the Rhein-Sieg-Kreis in North Rhine-Westphalia
- "Siedlung Reinshagen", a company town in Wuppertal
- an abandoned village at Adelebsen, also called Reynhardeshagen
