= Evil Redux =

Studio album by Syron Vanes
- Released: March 13, 2013
- Recorded: Mixtrak Studios, Sweden
- Genre: Heavy metal
- Length: 1:01:30
- Label: Denomination Records
- Producer: Anders Hahne

Syron Vanes chronology
Property Of.. (2007)	Evil Redux (2013)	Chaos from a Distance (2016)

Professional ratings
Review scores
Source	Rating
Metal Kaoz	7/10 stars
Rocknytt	8/10 stars
Rockhard Megazine	6/0 stars

Evil Redux is the fifth album from the Swedish heavy metal band Syron Vanes, released in 2013. It was produced by Anders Hahne.

== Recording ==
The album was recorded in Anders Hahne's studio between January 2012-February 2013. The work method was to write a song and then record it accordingly. This way of working did let us focus on one song at a time and it really helped each song on the album to shine. One important thing was the use of analog equipment before the signal was digitized. This according to Anders Hahne did make the sound very listenable.

All the songs were mixed and mastered in February 2013.

The final release medium was on CD and also digital files for digital download.

== Story ==
Evil Redux was a statement to get back to the classic Heavy Metal style Syron Vanes are known for. In 2011, Rimbert and Anders discussed how to make the best album in their careers to date and the conclusion was that they have to get back to their roots with classic Heavy Metal. A record with classic songs combined with a thunderous sound was the idea. 16 songs were written and 14 made it to the album. Evil Redux is also the first album Syron Vanes used drop tuning exclusively on the guitars to get a heavier sound. This is also the first time the new drummer Mats Bergentz (Silver Mountain/Mister Kite) appear on a Syron Vanes album.

== Album ==
The album begins with the instrumental piece "Overture" backed up by excerpts from the famous D-Day speech by Franklin D Roosevelt. This was used to connect the album to a war theme. The concept of the album is war and the song "End of The World" mirrors this in its video.

== Release ==
Evil Redux was released on March 13, 2013. The first song revealed was "Race Me To Hell". This song were filmed on video by Tommy Ledberg for the television show "Nitroz Burnout" on Swedish TV4. The second song revealed was "End of The World". A video was also made for this song.

== Track listing ==
Evil Redux

No.	Title	Lyrics	Music	Length
1.	"Overture"		Anders Hahne	01:31
2.	"Sacrifice"	Anders Hahne	Anders Hahne	04:22
3.	"Only Hell Remains"	Anders Hahne	Anders Hahne	04:48
4.	"End Of The World"	Anders Hahne	Anders Hahne	05:13
5.	"Devil's Dancing"	Rimbert Vahlstroem	Rimbert Vahlstroem	04:18
6.	"Hellion Child"	Anders Hahne	Anders Hahne	03:05
7.	"Heaven and Back"	Anders Hahne	Anders Hahne	04:19
8.	"King of It All"	Anders Hahne	Anders Hahne	05:06
9.	"Bringer of Evil"	Erik Briselius	Anders Hahne	05:47
10.	"Flyblown World"	Rimbert Vahlstroem	Rimbert Vahlstroem	04:14
11.	"God's gift"	Anders Hahne	Anders Hahne	04:09
12.	"Shadows of a Broken Dream"	Anders Hahne	Anders Hahne	04:42
13.	"Race Me to Hell"	Rimbert Vahlstroem	Rimbert Vahlstroem	03:50
14.	"Tyrant Angel"	Anders Hahne	Anders Hahne	06:06 ...
Total length:				01:01:30

== Personnel ==
Syron Vanes

- Rimbert Vahlstroem — Guitar/Lead Guitar — Lead Vocals
- Anders Hahne — Guitar/Lead Guitar
- Mats Bergentz — Drums
- Jakob Lagergren — Bass

== Production ==
- Produced by Anders Hahne
- Mixing Engineer Anders Hahne
- Recording Engineer Anders Hahne
- Mastering Engineer Thomas Eberger at Stockholm Mastering
- Sleeve artwork by Monowasp
- Photography by Johnny Kallenberg
- Published by Denomination Records
