= Hermann Burger =

Swiss poet, novelist and essayist (1942–1989)

Hermann Burger (10 July 1942 – 28 February 1989) was a Swiss poet, novelist and essayist. In his creative works, Burger often focused on society's lonely outsiders and, increasingly, the inevitability of death. His virtuosity in applying literary styles and use of thorough research are significant features of many of his publications.

== Life ==
Hermann Burger was born in 1942 in Menziken, Switzerland; his father worked for an insurance company. He enrolled at the ETH Zurich in 1962 and began studying architecture, but switched to German literature and art history in 1964. The publication of the poetry collection "Rauchsignale" ("Smoke Signals") in 1967 marked the beginning of his literary career, followed by the prose collection Bork in 1970. For the next couple of years, Burger focused on his career in literary studies, writing his thesis on Paul Celan and his habilitation treatise on contemporary Swiss literature. He taught at universities in Zürich, Bern and Fribourg and worked as a literary editor for the Aargauer Tagblatt. His academic experience is reflected in the loosely autobiographical novel "Die künstliche Mutter" ("The Artificial Mother"), which won him the Conrad-Ferdinand-Meyer-Preis in 1980. It was dedicated to his wife, and its first edition has the dedication "Für Anne Marie".

Burger's first major novel, "Schilten. Schulbericht zuhanden der Inspektorenkonferenz" ("Schilten. School Report for the Attention of the Inspectors' Conference") was published in 1976 and made into a movie by Swiss film director Beat Kuert in 1979. It is about a teacher who has to tell the conference of inspectors about the development of his pupils, but speaks about death cult, graveyards and burials in a very detailed way. Archetypes of these novels are Franz Kafka and Thomas Bernhard. Burger mixes reality and fiction, and the more one reads about him, the more one finds out that Burger writes about himself, his own suffering.

He won the Ingeborg Bachmann Prize in 1985 for his story "Die Wasserfallfinsternis von Badgastein" ("The Waterfall-Eclipse of Badgastein"). In 1988, a change of publishers from S. Fischer to Suhrkamp took place in a spectacular mannere novel Brenner (in two volumes, four were planned) shows a protagonist wrapped in cigar smoke, who tells his life. Burger himself was a cigar smoker and descendant of cigar producers. Volume 1 has 25 chapters, like a cigar box contains 25 cigars. Each chapter's name contains the name of a famous cigar brand. The second chapter announces the author's suicide intention to commit suicide: a red Ferrari is bought, because saving money no longer makes sense. It is about the divorce and the grief about having no contact with his two kids. Burger's last lessor was emeritus historian Jean Rudolf von Salis (= "Jérôme von Castelmur-Bondo" in the novel). The last months of Burger's life and a review of his 46 years are described in detail in this roman à clef; he describes all the coining persons.

Burger's depressive and desperate moods grew with his literary acclaim, leading him to write the "Tractatus logico-suicidalis" (1988), a collection of aphorisms advocating suicide. The 1046 aphorisms are about the sentence "Gegeben ist der Tod, bitte finden Sie die Lebensursache heraus." (Death is given, please find the cause of life.) The title remembers Ludwig Wittgenstein's Tractatus Logico-Philosophicus. The book about suicide was viewed by the critics with sarcasm, and the seriousness of his suicide plans was not recognized. On 28 February 1989, he committed suicide in Brunegg by taking an overdose of sleeping pills. Not until Burger's death did the critics see similarities to Jean Améry and his book On Suicide: A Discourse on Voluntary Death, which Burger knew.

Burger's early promoter Marcel Reich-Ranicki, a literature critic, wrote on 3 March 1989, a few days after his death, in an obituary:

Hermann Burger was an artist who gave everything of himself, never holding back. He was a man with a great longing for happiness. German literature has lost one of its most inventive literary artists.

His work—mainly prose—was characterised by precise investigation. He has sworn the magic oath because he wanted to write about a magician (in Diabelli). The oath created a new challenge for him: Describing Diabelli's tricks without breaking the oath.

Burger was very faithful in linguistic matters, too. When he was young and wanted to build his style of writing, he did copy passages out of literature (e.g. by Thomas Mann) and filled their syntax with new content. The protagonists of his novels and narrations try to describe the situation of their lives in a way that is linguistically virtuosic and in love with details. Those protagonists mostly are diseased, and the receiver of their texts is very often a higher authority, e.g. the "Inspektorenkonferenz" (inspector's conference) in "Schilten" (1976).

Hermann Burger's literary estate is archived in the Swiss Literary Archives in Bern.

== Selected bibliography ==
- Rauchsignale (1967) poems
- Bork (1970) prose pieces
- Schilten. Schulbericht zu Händen der Inspektorenkonferenz (1976). Monologue Diabelli1979, stories). Diabelli, trans. Adrian Nathan West (Wakefield Press, 2025)
- Kirchberger idyllen(1980) poems
- Die Künstliche Mutter (1982) novel
- Ein Mann aus Wörtern (1983)
- Die allmähliche Verfertigung der Idee beim Schreiben (1986)
- Blankenburg (1986) stories
- Als Autor auf der Stör (1987)
- Der Schuss auf die Kanzel. Eine Erzählung (1988)
- Tractatus logico-suicidalis. Über die Selbsttötung (1988). Tractatus Logico-Suicidalis: On Killing Oneself, trans. Adrian Nathan West (Wakefield Press, 2022)
- Brenner. Band 1: Brunsleben (1989). Brenner, trans. Adrian Nathan West (Archipelago Books, 2022)
- Brenner. Band 2: Menzenmang (1992, posthumous)

== Awards ==
- 1977 – Award of the Schweizerische Schillerstiftung for Schilten
- 1980 – Conrad Ferdinand Meyer-Award
- 1983 – Friedrich Hölderlin-Award of Bad Homburg for Die künstliche Mutter
- 1984 – Aargau Literature Award
- 1985 – Ingeborg Bachmann-Award for Die Wasserfallfinsternis von Badgastein, ein Hydrotestament in fünf Sätzen (in: Blankenburg)
- 1986 – Work order of the Stiftung Pro Helvetia
- 1988 – "Gesamtwerkspreis" of the Schweizerische Schillerstiftung
