= Marieluise-Fleißer-Preis =

German literary award

Marieluise-Fleißer-Preis is a German biennial literary prize, given by the town of Ingolstadt, Bavaria, on behalf of the Marieluise-Fleißer-Gesellschaft, in memory of the writer Marieluise Fleißer who was born in Ingolstadt. It is awarded to a German-language author who writes, as Fleißer did, about the conflict of unfulfilled claims to happiness and everyday life ("Konflikt zwischen unerfüllten Glücksansprüchen und dem alltäglichen Leben". The prize money is €10,000.

== Recipients ==
- 1981 Irmgard Keun
- 1986 Uwe Dick
- 1989 Herta Müller
- 1992 Thomas Hürlimann
- 1995 Robert Schneider
- 1998 Gert Heidenreich
- 2001 Petra Morsbach
- 2003 Harald Grill
- 2005 Kerstin Specht
- 2007 Franz Xaver Kroetz
- 2009 Dea Loher
- 2011 Sibylle Lewitscharoff
- 2013 Rainald Goetz
- 2015 Ulrich Peltzer
- 2017 Christoph Ransmayr
- 2019 Iris Wolff
- 2021 Ines Geipel
- 2023 Lena Gorelik
- 2025 Jonas Lüscher
