= Venus und Adonis =

Opera by Hans Werner Henze

- Opera by Hans Werner Henze
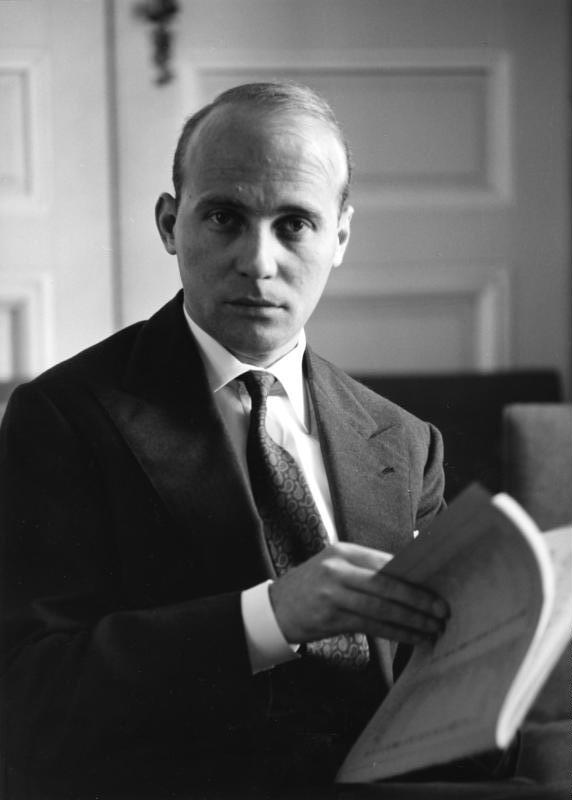
- The composer in 1960
- Librettist: Hans-Ulrich Treichel
- Language: German
- Based on: Shakespeare's "Venus and Adonis"
- Premiere: 11 January 1997; Bavarian State Opera, Munich

Venus und Adonis is a one-act opera by Hans Werner Henze with a German libretto by Hans-Ulrich Treichel, after the poem by William Shakespeare. The work uses singers and dancers.

It was first performed by the Bavarian State Opera in Munich on 11 January 1997. The American première was at the Santa Fe Opera in August 2000, staged by Alfred Kirchner, and the same production was used for the Canadian première, which took place in Toronto in 2001. The Japanese premiere was given in concert form in Tokyo on 11 January 2001.

== Roles ==
Roles, voice types, premiere cast
Role	Voice type	Premiere cast, 11 January 1997 (Conductor: Markus Stenz)
Clemente	tenor	Chris Merritt
Heldendarsteller	baritone	Ekkehard Wlaschiha
Primadonna	soprano	Nadine Secunde
6 Madrigalists		

== Sources ==
- Brockmeier, Jens (2003). "Mythische Imagination in der Musik Hans Werner Henzes" [Mythical imagination in the music of Hans Werner Henze]. In Peter Petersen (ed.). Hans Werner Henze: Die Vorträge des internationalen Henze-Symposions am Musikwissenschaftlichen Institut der Universität Hamburg 28. bis 30. Juni 2001. Hamburger Jahrbuch für Musikwissenschaft (in German). Vol. 20. Frankfurt, Berlin, Bern, Brussels, New York, Oxford, Vienna: Peter Lang. ISBN 978-3-631-51114-5.
- Casaglia, Gherardo (2005)."Venus und Adonis, 11 January 1997". L'Almanacco di Gherardo Casaglia (in Italian).
- Chōki, Seiji [長木誠司]. 1997. "Hentse no shinsaku opera Vinasu to Adonisu shoen" [The première of Henze's new opera Venus und Adonis]. Ongaku geijutsu (March): 18–56.
