= Mülheimer Dramatikerpreis =

Theater award in Germany

Mülheimer Dramatikerpreis ("dramatist award of Mülheim"), founded in 1976, is one of the leading theater awards in Germany. It is awarded by an open jury of theater professionals, critics and playwrights who watch a short list of productions during the Stücke festival; the productions are not the full play but a piece, often the first act. The short list is chosen by a jury from plays that were first performed in Germany during the prior season. The winner receives €15,000.

== Winners ==
- 1976 Franz Xaver Kroetz – Das Nest
- 1977 Gerlind Reinshagen – Sonntagskinder
- 1978 Martin Sperr – Die Spitzeder
- 1979 Heiner Müller – Germania – Tod in Berlin
- 1980 Ernst Jandl – Aus der Fremde
- 1981 Peter Greiner – Kiez
- 1982 Botho Strauß – Kalldewey, Farce
- 1983 George Tabori – Jubiläum
- 1984 Lukas B. Suter – Schrebers Garten
- 1985 Klaus Pohl – Das alte Land
- 1986 Herbert Achternbusch – Gust
- 1987 Volker Ludwig – Linie 1
- 1988 Rainald Goetz – Krieg
- 1989 Tankred Dorst – Korbes
- 1990 George Tabori – Weisman und Rotgesicht
- 1991 Georg Seidel – Villa Jugend
- 1992 Werner Schwab – Volksvernichtung oder Meine Leber ist sinnlos
- 1993 Rainald Goetz – Katarakt
- 1994 Herbert Achternbusch – Der Stiefel und sein Socken
- 1995 Einar Schleef – Totentrompeten
- 1996 Werner Buhss – Bevor wir Greise wurden
- 1997 Urs Widmer – Top Dogs
- 1998 Dea Loher – Adam Geist
- 1999 Oliver Bukowski – Gäste (Tragödie)
- 2000 Rainald Goetz – Jeff Koons
- 2001 René Pollesch – world wide web-slums
- 2002 Elfriede Jelinek – Macht nichts
- 2003 Fritz Kater – Zeit zu lieben Zeit zu sterben
- 2004 Elfriede Jelinek – Das Werk
- 2005 Lukas Bärfuss – Der Bus (Das Zeug einer Heiligen)
- 2006 René Pollesch Cappuccetto Rosso
- 2007 Helgard Haug / Daniel Wetzel (Rimini Protokoll) Karl Marx: Das Kapital, Erster Band
- 2008 Dea Loher – Das letzte Feuer
- 2009 Elfriede Jelinek – Rechnitz (Der Würgeengel)
- 2010 Roland Schimmelpfennig – Der goldene Drache in the production of the Wiener Burgtheater
- 2011 Elfriede Jelinek – Winterreise
- 2012 Peter Handke – Storm Still (Immer noch Sturm)
- 2013 Katja Brunner – von den beinen zu kurz
- 2014 Wolfram Höll – Und dann
- 2015 Ewald Palmetshofer – die unverheiratete
- 2016 Wolfram Höll – Drei sind wir
- 2017 Anne Lepper – Mädchen in Not
- 2018 Thomas Köck – paradies spielen (abendland. ein abgesang)
- 2019 Thomas Köck – atlas
- 2020 canceled due to the COVID-19 pandemic
- 2021 Ewelina Benbenek – Tragödienbastard
- 2022 Sivan Ben Yishai – Wounds are forever (Selbstporträt als Nationaldichterin)
- 2023 Caren Jeß – Die Katze Eleonore
- 2024 Sivan Ben Yishai – Nora oder Wie man das Herrenhaus kompostiert
- 2025 Maria Milisavljević – Staubfrau
- 2026 Kim de l'Horizon – Die kleinen Meerjungraun
