= Property of.. =

Property Of..

Studio album by Syron Vanes
- Released: 2007
- Recorded: Bankrobber Studios, Sweden
- Genre: Heavy metal
- Length: 38:16
- Label: Record Heaven
- Producer: Rimbert Vahlstroem

Syron Vanes chronology
Insane (2003)	Property Of.. (2007)	Evil Redux.. (2013)

Professional ratings
Review scores
Source	Rating
Metalrage	7/10 stars

Property Of.. is the fourth album by Swedish heavy metal band Syron Vanes, released in 2007. It was produced by Rimbert Vahlstroem.

== Story ==
The album is the only Syron Vanes album without Anders Hahne who left the band for a long break right after the album Insane in 2003.

== Album ==
Property Of.. was released 2007. The album got some nice reviews, Gary Hill at Music Street Journal wrote: Well, as strong as this disc is, I can sure see why. If you are a fan of old school metal you’ll certainly love this album. It rocks out with the best of them and will probably be near the top of my list of best metal discs of the year.

== Track listing ==
Insane

No.	Title	Writer(s)	Length
1.	"Wild"	R.Vahlstroem	3:42
2.	"All Forbidden"	R.Vahlstroem	3:46
3.	"Doctor"	R.Vahlstroem	3:30
4.	"Get Out of My face"	R.Vahlstroem	4:25
5.	"Higher"	R.Vahlstroem	3:30
6.	"Problem"	R.Vahlstroem	3:08
7.	"Rough Trade"	R.Vahlstroem	4:21
8.	"Sinner"	R.Vahlstroem	4:05
9.	"Voodoo Doll"	R.Vahlstroem	3:11
10.	"Want Me"	R.Vahlstroem	4:38

== Personnel ==
Syron Vanes

- Rimbert Vahlstroem — Guitar/Lead Guitar — Lead Vocals
- Staffan Lindstedt — Drums
- Michel Strand — Bass

Production

- Produced by Rimbert Vahlstroem
- Mixing Engineer Anders Hahne
- Recording Engineer Rimbert Vahlstroem
- Mastering EngineerCutting Room Stockholm
- Sleeve artwork by Rimbert Vahlstroem
- Photography by
- Published by Record Heaven
