= Kalldewey, Farce =

1981 play by Botho Strauss

- Written by: Botho Strauß
- Original language: German

Premiere
- Date premiered: 31 January 1982
- Place premiered: Deutsches Schauspielhaus, Hamburg

Kalldewey, Farce is a 1981 play by the German writer Botho Strauß. It follows a couple, Lynn and Hans, who are mysteriously unable to break up, are visited by an unknown man called Kalldewey, and go through a peculiar form of therapy.

The play was published in 1981 by Carl Hanser Verlag. It was premiered on stage on 31 January 1982 at the Deutsches Schauspielhaus in Hamburg, directed by Niels-Peter Rudolph. It was awarded the 1982 Mülheimer Dramatikerpreis.
