= Oniritti Höhlenbilder =

2016 book by Botho Strauß

- Cover of the first edition
- Author: Botho Strauß
- Language: German
- Publisher: Carl Hanser Verlag
- Publication date: 10 October 2016
- Publication place: Germany
- Pages: 288
- ISBN: 978-3-446-25402-2

Oniritti Höhlenbilder ("oniritti cave pictures") is a 2016 book by the German writer Botho Strauß. It consists of fragmentary scenes and dreamlike imagery, with a focus on problems related to a lack of privacy and imagination in the digital age. "Oniritti" is a combination of the Greek word "oneiros", meaning "dream", and "graffiti".

== Reception ==
Björn Hayer of Der Spiegel wrote: "the cultural critic Strauß, known, in addition to his literary prose, for his social-accusatory essays such as "Anschwellender Bocksgesang" (1993) or "Das letzte Jahrhundert des Menschen. Was aber kommen wird, ist Netzwerk. Bemerkungen zu Sein und Zeit" (1999), spares no scorn and mockery on the virtual age." Hayer called Strauß "the grand seigneur of German literature", and described Oniritti Höhlenbilder as "a thoughtful ride—with a remainingly youthful joy of images—through the perception channels of our late modernity. Or in other words: a delight to read." Rainer Schaper reviewed the book for Schweizer Radio und Fernsehen, and wrote: "In dreams, dialogues, genre scenes and aphorisms he formulates objections, which sometimes are convincing, sometimes less. Successful are the scenes in which already the presentation is criticism."
