= Bringer of Evil =

Bringer Of Evil

Studio album by Syron Vanes
- Released: 1984
- Recorded: Ebony Studios, Kingston upon Hull, England
- Genre: heavy metal
- Length: 34:37
- Label: Ebony Records
- Producer: Darryl Johnston

Syron Vanes chronology
Bringer Of Evil (1984)	Revenge (1986)

Bringer Of Evil is the debut album by the Swedish heavy metal band Syron Vanes released in 1984. It was produced by Darryl Johnston. It was remastered 2012 with two bonus tracks added.

== Background ==
The album was recorded in record producer Darryl Johnston's studio.

The studio was located in Darryl's house in Kingston upon Hull in England. The record company Ebony Records was also located in the same building at the second floor. The album was recorded to analog tape and the final release media was on vinyl. All the songs were recorded in 5 days and was entirely played live in the studio as opposed to the more popular method recording each musician separately used today.

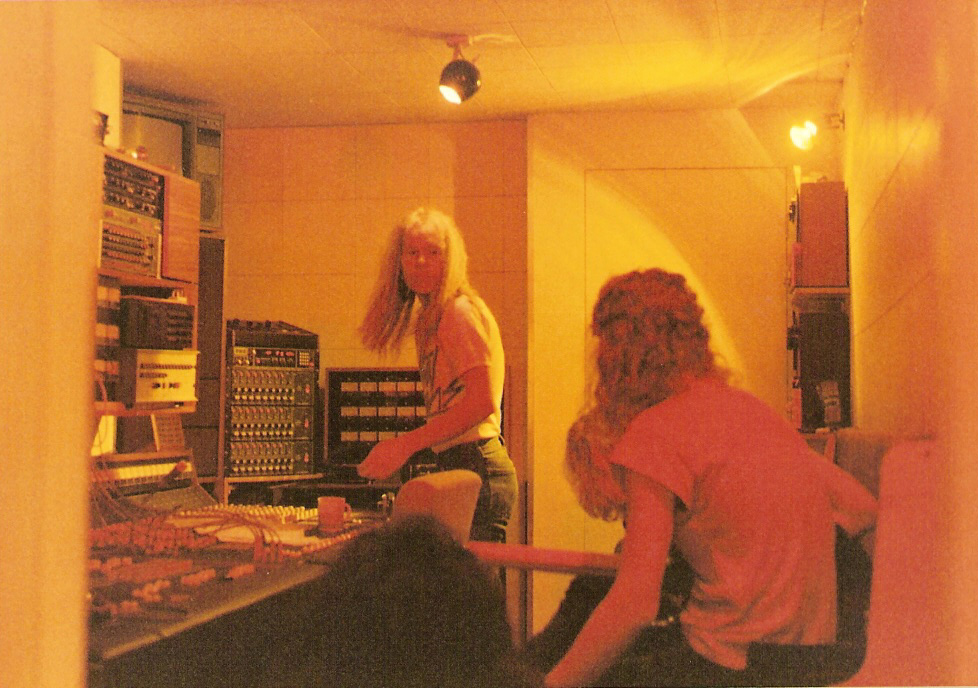
Darryl Johnston and Anders Hahne in the control room

As Anders Hahne (guitar) recalls the studio was very small. The recording room was the size of a medium living room and the control room the size of a small bedroom.

The album title was from the beginning "Born To Rock" but Darryl didn't like it so it was changed to "Bringer Of Evil". While the band was in the studio they witnessed the first order of 5000 album from a USA distributor.

The songs "Bringer Of Evil", "Suicide" and "Born To Rock" are still performed live to this day.

== Artwork ==
This is the only album featuring their original "Old English Gothic" logo, the kind used by the band until it changed in 1985. The old logo is still popular today as it appears on some merchandise as T-shirts and other items. The artwork is designed by Terry Greer and the snake symbolizes the S in Syron, while the two arrows together symbolize the V in Vanes.

== Remaster ==
2012 the band got contacted by Primo Bonali from the Italian record company Steelheart Memories. He wanted to release the album on CD for the first time. There was an issue, because no one knew where the original tapes were stored. Rimbert did remember though that he gave his mother a copy in 1984 and he was sure it has never been out of its package. He was correct; it was completely untouched. The remaster is digitized from vinyl, so any cracks and pops are digitally removed. The album was digitally remastered and reissued 2012. The remaster have the same cover as the original vinyl but includes many unpublished pictures of the band during that era.

It also includes two bonus tracks: "Violation" from a compilation album the group appeared on in 1982, and a demo track from 1983 called "Steal And Run".

== Track listing ==
No.	Title	Lyrics	Music	Length
1.	"Sound Of Metal"	Erik Briselius (Rix Volin)	Anders Hahne (Andy Seymore)	03:16
2.	"Bringer Of Evil"	Erik Briselius (Rix Volin)	Anders Hahne (Andy Seymore)	05:23
3.	"Suicide"	Erik Briselius (Rix Volin)/Anders Hahne (Andy Seymore)	Anders Hahne (Andy Seymore)	04:22
4.	"Born To Rock"	Erik Briselius (Rix Volin)	Anders Hahne (Andy Seymore)	04:01
5.	"On Your Knees"	Erik Briselius (Rix Volin)	Rimbert Vahlstroem (Rimmy Hunter)	04:03
6.	"Run Away"	Erik Briselius (Rix Volin)	Rimbert Vahlstroem (Rimmy Hunter)	04:28
7.	"Crying For Ages"	Erik Briselius (Rix Volin)	Anders Hahne (Andy Seymore)	03:58
8.	"Running Wild"	Erik Briselius (Rix Volin)	Anders Hahne (Andy Seymore)	05:06 ...
Total length:				34:37

2012 Remaster including bonus tracks

No.	Title	Lyrics	Music	Length
1.	"Sound Of Metal"	Erik Briselius (Rix Volin)	Anders Hahne (Andy Seymore)	03:16
2.	"Bringer Of Evil"	Erik Briselius (Rix Volin)	Anders Hahne (Andy Seymore)	05:23
3.	"Suicide"	Erik Briselius (Rix Volin)/Anders Hahne (Andy Seymore)	Anders Hahne (Andy Seymore)	04:22
4.	"Born To Rock"	Erik Briselius (Rix Volin)	Anders Hahne (Andy Seymore)	04:01
5.	"On Your Knees"	Erik Briselius (Rix Volin)	Rimbert Vahlstroem (Rimmy Hunter)	04:03
6.	"Run Away"	Erik Briselius (Rix Volin)	Rimbert Vahlstroem (Rimmy Hunter)	04:28
7.	"Crying For Ages"	Erik Briselius (Rix Volin)	Anders Hahne (Andy Seymore)	03:58
8.	"Running Wild"	Erik Briselius (Rix Volin)	Anders Hahne (Andy Seymore)	05:06
9.	"Violation"	Staffan Lindstedt	Anders Hahne
10.	"Steal And Run"	Erik Briselius	Anders Hahne	...

== Personnel ==
Syron Vanes

- Anders Hahne (Andy Seymore) — Guitar
- Rimbert Vahlstroem (Rimmy Hunter) — Guitar
- Erik Briselius (Rix Volin) — Vocals
- Staffan Lindstedt (Stephen Mavrock) — Drums
- Arne Sandved (Ace Greensmith) — Bass

Production

- Produced by Darryl Johnston
- Recorded at Ebony studios
- Sleeve artwork by Terry Greer
- Band photograph by Ola Nilzzon
- Published by Ebony Records

Production remaster and bonus tracks

- Mastered by Anders Hahne
- Violation recorded at GS Studios Sweden 1982
- Steal and run recorded at Morges studio Sweden 1983
- Published by Steelheart Records
