= Couples, Passersby =

Short story collection

- First edition
- Author: Botho Strauß
- Original title: Paare, Passanten
- Translator: Roslyn Theobald
- Language: German
- Publisher: Bertelsmann
- Publication date: 1981
- Publication place: West Germany
- English publication date: 1 December 1996
- Pages: 204
- ISBN: 9783446131453

Couples, Passersby (German: Paare, Passanten) is a 1981 short story collection by the German writer Botho Strauß. It consists of narrative vignettes and aphoristic sequences, divided into six sections: "Couples", "Traffic Flow", "Scribbles", "Dimmer", "By Ourselves", and "Idiots of the Immediate".

The book was published in English in 1996, translated by Roslyn Theobald.

== Contents ==
- "Couples" ("Paare")
- "Traffic Flow" ("Verkehrsfluss")
- "Scribbles" ("Schrieb")
- "Dimmer" ("Dämmer")
- "By Ourselves" ("Einzelne")
- "Idiots of the Immediate" ("Der Gegenwartsnarr")

== Reception ==
Publishers Weekly's critic wrote that "Strauss's voice is stronger" in the book's "bleak vignettes" than in his "musing, surrealistic descriptive passages or his grumblings about art and society". The critic wrote that some of the passages are so "undilutedly alienated they read almost as parody-German intellectualism at its most grim", while others "are truly haunting, reminding readers that postmodernism can translate as historical and emotional homelessness".

Kirkus Reviews described the content as "six interchangeable patchwork stories, each a seemingly arbitrary collection of discrete scenes and statements meant to express our common solipsism and essential selfishness." The critic wrote that

only in "dimmer" is there an engagingly specific fictional invention: a revisionist creation myth according to which men and women originally did not cohabit but instead gave birth separately, to his or her replacement, as it were, at the moment of death. One wants more such invention and less of what Strauss, in a passing theoretical fit, defines as "an art which denies itself the delights of perfect normality, and ... turns to the intricate demands of the symbolic ... running the danger that what is created might only celebrate the idea."
