= Syron Vanes =

Swedish heavy metal band

- Origin: Arlöv, Sweden
- Genres: Heavy metal, hard rock
- Years active: 1980–present
- Labels: Ebony; Carnival; Record Heaven; Denomination
- Members: Rimbert Vahlstroem; Anders Hahne; Mats Bergentz; Anders Sellborn
- Past members: Staffan Lindstedt; Erik Briselius; Jakob Lagergren; Michel Strand; Peter Espinoza; Anders Hansson; Abbe Ahlbin; Jocke Magnusson; Mårten Hedener; Dick Qwarfort; Arne Sandved; Ola Petersson; Anders Lind
- Website: http://www.syronvanes.com/

Syron Vanes is a Swedish heavy metal band formed in 1980 in Arlöv, Sweden. Originally assembled by former Drummer Staffan Lindstedt and guitarist Anders Hahne they are a big part of the early Swedish heavy metal scene. "We just wanted to be rock stars Anders Hahne recalls"

== Biography ==
Syron Vanes were one of the first bands coming from Sweden inspired by the new wave of British heavy metal (NWOBHM). After a tour in Germany in 1983, Ebony Records owner and producer Darryl Johnston offered the band a record deal, and in 1984 their first album Bringer of Evil was released. The album sold well and Syron Vanes appeared in almost every rock magazine, hailed in the music press as the new big thing.

The second album Revenge was released in 1986 and was the last record under the wings of Ebony Records.

While most early-80s era metal bands disappeared Syron Vanes took a break but never disband. They continued to tour and to write songs, but no records were made until 2003 when the new album Insane was released. The new album got great reviews and was a new start for the band, whose tour culminated with a show at Sweden Rock 2003.

In 2004, Anders Hahne left the band to take a break.

In 2007, the album Property of.. was released and also got some good reviews. Syron vanes was a 3-piece band at this time. The album was mixed by Anders Hahne. He re-joined Syron Vanes in 2009 and the band began to write songs for a new album.

The album Evil Redux was released in 2013 and Syron Vanes once again enter the scene. Pete Pardo at Sea Of Tranquility wrote: "If you like classic metal sounds, chances are you're going to get a lot of mileage out of this CD. It's not hard to get into headbanging form with tracks such as "Sacrifice", "Only Hell Remains", "Hellion Child", "Heaven and Back", and the grinding "Bringer of Evil". Plenty of tasty, crunchy riffage throughout the album courtesy of Vahlstroem & Hahne, and with the spot on production it only raises the enjoyment factor".

Syron Vanes having enjoyed a more than 30-year career with no plans to retire.

By June 2014, Syron Vanes were very special guest for Jake E. Lee's Red Dragon Cartel on his UK tour. The concerts were at the O2 Academy Islington London and Rescue Rooms in Nottingham. In July 2014 they were opening for Sebastian Bach.

In early 2016, the band released their sixth album titled Chaos from a Distance, which was received well by Swedish press.

== Members ==
Current members

- Anders Hahne – guitar (1980–present)
- Rimbert Vahlstroem – guitar, lead vocals (1981–present)
- Mats Bergentz – drums (2011–present)
- Anders Sellborn – bass guitar (2013–present)

Former members

- Staffan Lindstedt – drums (1980–2011)
- Erik Briselius – vocals (1981–1986)
- Jakob Lagergren – bass
- Michel Strand – bass
- Peter Espinoza – guitar
- Anders Hansson – drums
- Abbe Ahlbin – bass
- Peter Christensson
- Jocke Magnusson – drums
- Mårten Hedener – drums
- Dick Qwarfort – bass
- Arne Sandved – bass
- Ola Petersson – guitar (1980–1981)
- Anders Lind – bass (1980–1981)

== Discography ==
Studio albums

- Bringer of Evil (1984)
- Revenge (1986)
- Insane (2003)
- Property of.. (2007)
- Evil Redux (2013)
- Chaos from a Distance (2016)
