= Living Glimmering Lying =

- Cover of the first edition
- Author: Botho Strauß
- Original title: Wohnen Dämmern Lügen
- Translator: Roslyn Theobald
- Language: German
- Publisher: Carl Hanser Verlag
- Publication date: 8 August 1994
- Publication place: Germany
- English publication date: 1 August 1999
- Pages: 208
- ISBN: 978-3-446-17875-5

Living Glimmering Lying (German: Wohnen Dämmern Lügen) is a 1994 book by the German writer Botho Strauß. It consists of literary vignettes about alienated people in post-reunification Berlin. The book was published in English in 1999, translated by Roslyn Theobald.

== Reception ==
Publishers Weekly wrote in 1999:

Strauss's narrators, whether telling their stories in the first or third person, are middle-aged intellectuals and observers resigned to their fates and often undone by "rare conjunctions" and "borderline encounters." ... Despite Strauss's beautifully limpid writing, the reader craves more continuity than is provided, and latches onto the first-person segments hoping for an engagement that rarely manifests itself. In the end, these disconnected speeches spin themselves out emptily[.]

Noah Isenberg of The New York Times wrote that "Strauss offers redolent musings, sumptuous and refined", although "much of the writing here is marred by its opacity and by tiresome, pretentious rambling that keeps the reader from ever gaining access to the deeper meaning Strauss's work undoubtedly aspires to convey".
