= Nadine Secunde =

American operatic soprano (born 1953)

- Born: 21 December 1953 (age 72); Independence, Ohio, US
- Education: Oberlin Conservatory; Indiana University; Musikhochschule Stuttgart
- Occupation: Operatic soprano
- Organizations: Hessisches Staatstheater Wiesbaden; Cologne Opera; Bayreuth Festival

Nadine Secunde (born 21 December 1953) is an American operatic soprano. She studied and performed in Germany, singing at the Bayreuth Festival the leading role of Elsa in Lohengrin and Sieglinde in Die Walküre, and made an international career. A specialist for the works of Wagner and Richard Strauss, she has also performed contemporary operas such as the title role of Judith by Siegfried Matthus at the Seattle Opera in the work's U.S. premiere.

== Life and career ==
Secunde was born in Independence near Cleveland, Ohio, on 21 December 1953. She studied piano and voice at the Oberlin Conservatory and Indiana University with Margaret Harshaw. She studied from 1979 on a Fulbright scholarship at the Musikhochschule Stuttgart. In 1980, she was engaged at the Hessisches Staatstheater Wiesbaden. She performed in 1982 the role of Elvira in Auber's Die Stumme von Portici, conducted by Siegfried Köhler, Sinaide, the pharao's wife, in Rossini's Mosè, alongside Eike Wilm Schulte as the pharao, and Micaela in Bizet's Carmen, Later she performed also major roles in Wagner stage works.

She became a member of the Cologne Opera in 1985 and received attention in her début in the title part of Janáceks Káťa Kabanová, staged by Harry Kupfer and conducted by Gerd Albrecht. She performed the title role of Arabella by Richard Strauss at the Bavarian State Opera.

Secunde appeared at the Bayreuth Festival first in 1987, as Elsa in the Lohengrin production conducted by Daniel Barenboim. Wolfgang Wagner engaged her after having heard her performance in Wiesbaden. She sang the role also at the Royal Opera House in London in 1988, and at La Fenice in Venice in 1990. From 1988 to 1992, she was in Bayreuth Sieglinde in Die Walküre, a role which she also performed in Cologne and in 1991 at the Teatro Liceo in Barcelona. She sang at Covent Garden Chrysothemis in Elektra by Strauss in 1990. The same year, she performed the title role of Judith by Siegfried Matthus at the Seattle Opera in the work's U.S. premiere. In 1991, she performed Cassandre in Les Troyens by Hector Berlioz in Los Angeles. In 1996, Secunde sang the Brünnhilde role in Wagner's Die Walküre at Teatro Colon in Buenos Aires.

Secunde performed the role of the primadonna in the premiere of Hans Werner Henze's one-act opera Venus und Adonis at the Bavarian State Opera on 11 January 1997, conducted by Markus Stenz. She performed Brünnhilde in Wagner's Ring Cycle at the Wrocław Opera, completed in 2006. In 2018, she returned to Wiesbaden as the Kabanicha in Janáček's Katja Kabanowa.

=== Personal life ===
Secunde is married to Heiner Rekeszus, a musicologist and dealer with historic musical documents.

== Recordings and honours ==
Secunde recorded the part of Miss Jessel in Benjamin Britten's The Turn of the Screw in 1993, a production of the Aldeburgh Festival conducted by Steuart Bedford, and alongside Philip Langridge as Quint. A review noted her "powerful voice", continuing: She "is quite superb in 'her' scene (Act 2 Scene 3/Variation X, 'Miss Jessel'), her voice wonderfully rich." In 2002, she recorded the title role of Dmitri Shostakovich's Lady Macbeth of Mtsensk on DVD, in a production of the Teatro Liceo conducted by Alexander Anisimov. She received praise not only for her singing but also her "formidable acting skills".

Secunde is an honorary member of the Hessisches Staatstheater.
