= Insanity (disambiguation) =

Insanity is a spectrum of behaviors characterized by certain abnormal mental or behavioral patterns.

Insanity may also refer to:

== Television and film ==
- Insanity (2015 film), a Chinese-Hong Kong film
- Insanity (2019 film), a Finnish film
- Insanity (TV series), a 2021 Brazilian psychological thriller television series

== Music ==
- Insanity (album), a 2001 album by Darkane, reissued in 2011 and 2012
- "Insanity" (song), a 2007 song by Darin Zanyar
- "Insanity", a 1991 song by Oceanic
- "Insanity", a 1994 song by Oingo Boingo from the album Boingo
- "Insanity", a Vocaloid song featuring SF-A2 Miki and KAITO, made by CircusP

== Other uses ==
- Insanity defense, a legal defense in a criminal case
- Insanity (ride), an amusement ride at the Stratosphere, Las Vegas, Nevada, US
- Insanity (radio), a community radio station based at Royal Holloway, University of London
- Insanity (home exercise system), a workout regimen offered by Beachbody

== See also ==
- Insane (disambiguation)
