= Devotion (novella) =

1977 novella by Botho Strauß

- First edition
- Author: Botho Strauß
- Original title: Die Widmung
- Translator: Sophie Wilkins
- Language: German
- Publisher: Carl Hanser Verlag
- Publication date: 1977
- Publication place: West Germany
- English publication date: 1979
- Pages: 144
- ISBN: 978-3-446-12415-8

Devotion (German: Die Widmung) is a 1977 novella by the German writer Botho Strauß. It tells the story of a Berlin bookseller in his early 30s who is abandoned by his girlfriend, isolates himself and begins to write literature, convinced that the girlfriend will return.

== Publication ==
The book was published by Carl Hanser Verlag in 1977. It appeared in English in 1979, translated by Sophie Wilkins and published by Farrar, Straus and Giroux. Northwestern University Press released a new edition in 1995 as part of its Hydra Books series.

== Reception ==
Lore Dickstein of the Saturday Review described the book as "a brilliant, hard-edged analysis of the act of writing". Dickstein wrote, "The spare abstract quality of Strauss's language is the reflection of his subject: the isolation of the self/artist in a world where no one really listens. While some readers will prefer the more richly furnished world of a novelist like V.S. Naipaul, this book by Botho Strauss is like a sculpture by Giacometti—clean, pared-down, and without a shred of unnecessary flesh."
