= Roland Schimmelpfennig =

German theatre director and playwright (born 1967)

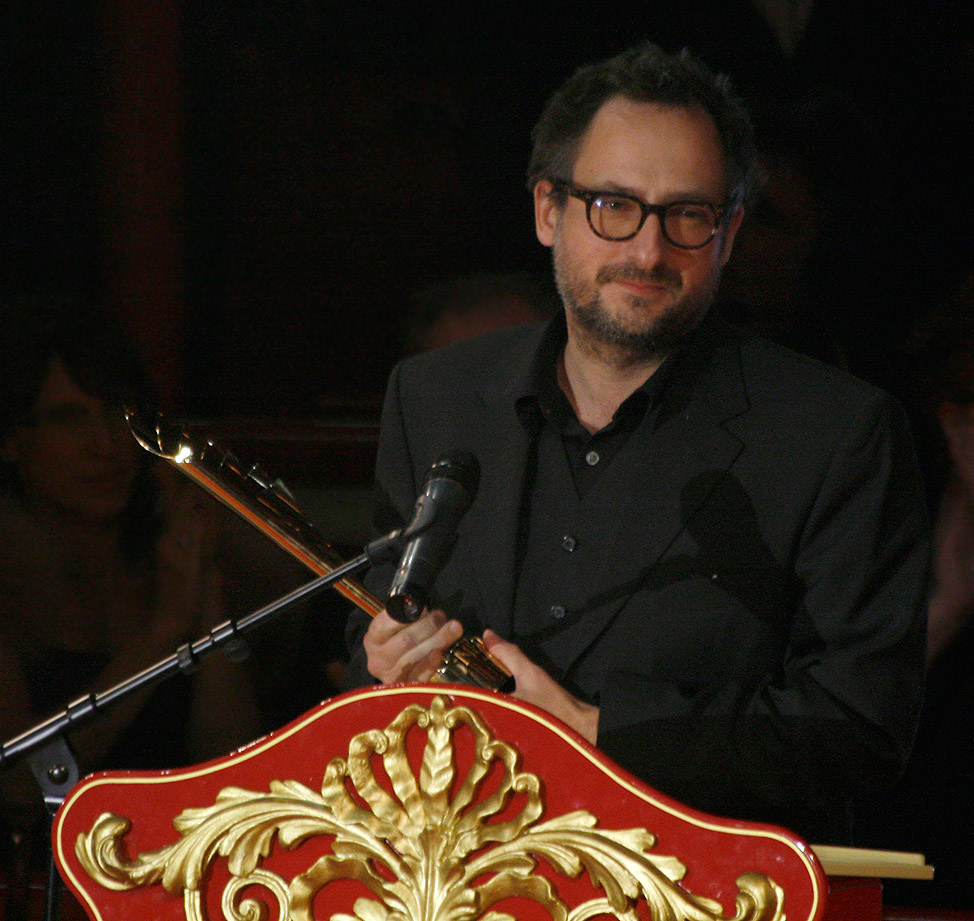
- Schimmelpfennig in 2009
- Born: 19 September 1967 (age 59); Gottingen, Germany
- Education: Otto Falckenberg School of the Performing Arts
- Occupations: Theatre director; playwright; librettist; radio writer

Roland Schimmelpfennig (born 19 September 1967) is a German theatre director and playwright. His plays are performed in more than 40 countries.

== Biography ==
Schimmelpfennig was born in Göttingen. He began his career as a journalist in Istanbul, but starting in 1990 he studied at the Otto Falckenberg School of the Performing Arts to be a theatre director. He is one of Germany's most prolific playwrights, widely praised in Europe but relatively obscure in the United States. His work is said to vary from "kaleidoscopic" and dreamlike to naturalistic. He lives in the Eastern part of Berlin with his wife. Two of his plays, translated as Push Up and The Woman Before, have been performed at the Royal Court Theatre in London. His play Ant Street was staged as part of Volta International Festival at the Arcola Theatre in 2015.

He wrote the libretto for the opera Der goldene Drache by Péter Eötvös, composed and premiered in 2014, based on his 2010 play. Schimmelpfennig's debut novel, An einem klaren eiskalten Januarmorgen zu Beginn des 21. Jahrhunderts was translated into English by Jamie Bulloch and published by MacLehose Press in 2018 as One Clear, Ice-Cold January Morning at the Beginning of the Twenty-First Century. Schimmelpfennig's work has been presented on BBC Radio, most recently the International Arts Production of Black Water on BBC Radio 3.

== Awards ==
- 2010 Mülheimer Dramatikerpreis
- 2010 Else Lasker-Schüler Dramatist Prize
- 2009 and 2002 Nestroy Theatre Prize
