= Insane (album) =

Studio album by Syron Vanes
- Released: 2003
- Studios: Smallhouse Studios, Sweden
- Genre: Heavy metal
- Length: 39:46
- Label: Carnival Records
- Producer: Anders Hahne

Syron Vanes chronology
Revenge (1986)	Insane (2003)	Property Of.. (2007)

Professional ratings
Review scores
Source	Rating
Stark Music	5/5 stars
Rock United	6/6 stars

Insane is the third album by the Swedish heavy metal band Syron Vanes, released in 2003. It was produced by Anders Hahne.

== Recording ==
The album was recorded in Anders Hahne's Smallhouse Studios studio in 2003. This was the album that would mark Syron Vanes comeback. All the songs were mixed and mastered in February 2003. The final release medium was on CD.

== Story ==
Musically this album has a more modern approach than the albums from the 1980s. The band decided that there shouldn't be any guitar solos on the songs, although "Black World" and "Keep me Up" do have solos. A video was made of the song Insane

== Track listing ==
No.	Title	Writer(s)	Length
1.	"Insane"	A.Hahne	4:10
2.	"No Difference"	A.Hahne	2:40
3.	"Why"	A.Hahne	4:57
4.	"Bad Desire"	A.Hahne	2:41
5.	"Kill the Dead"	A.Hahne	2:30
6.	"Holy Man"	A.Hahne	3:39
7.	"Deathroll"	A.Hahne	2:44
8.	"Human Faces"	A.Hahne	3:34
9.	"Black World"	A.Hahne	3:02
10.	"Rock'n'Roll Parole"	A.Hahne	3:00
11.	"King of Day"	A.Hahne	2:57
12.	"Keep me Up"	R.Vahlstroem	3:52

== Personnel ==
Syron Vanes

- Rimbert Vahlstroem – guitar, lead vocals
- Anders Hahne – guitar
- Staffan Lindstedt – drums
- Jakob Lagergren – bass

Production

- Produced by Anders Hahne
- Mixing Engineer Anders Hahne
- Recording Engineer Anders Hahne
- Mastering Engineer Thomas Eberger at Cutting Room Stockholm
- Sleeve artwork by Anders Ohlin and Valentine Pecovnik
- Photography by Anders Ohlin
- Published by Carnival Records
