= When We Cease to Understand the World =

2020 book by Benjamín Labatut

- Book cover
- Author: Benjamín Labatut
- Original title: Un Verdor Terrible
- Translator: Adrian Nathan West
- Language: Spanish
- Genre: Historical fiction, alternate history, metafiction
- Published: 2020
- Publisher: Anagrama
- Publication place: Spain
- English publication date: 2021 (Pushkin Press, New York Review of Books)
- Pages: 192
- ISBN: 9781681375663

When We Cease to Understand the World (Spanish: Un Verdor Terrible; lit. 'A Terrible Greenness') is a 2020 book by Chilean writer Benjamín Labatut. Originally written in Spanish and published by Anagrama, the book was translated into English by Adrian Nathan West and published by Pushkin Press and New York Review of Books in 2021. It describes the life of scientists who worked to revolutionize science and its related fields, and explores the themes of sacrifice.

A historiographical metafiction, numerous critics have either referred to the book as a novel or a collection of short stories in essayistic style. The book was shortlisted for the International Booker Prize. It was on the New York Times Book Review's 10 Best Books of 2021 and in 2024 was ranked as 83rd in the 100 Best Books of the 21st Century by New York Times.

== Background ==
Benjamín Labatut was inspired by the limitations and misunderstanding of science, and wanted to use fictional themes to give accounts of early scientists. The novel was first written in Spanish language in 2020 under the title Un Verdor Terrible. It was translated into English by Adrian Nathan West, who, according to him, collaborated closely with Labatut to ensure accuracy, until the book's publication in 2021.

Labatut presented the scientists in a light status. The book began with an apocalyptic scene. Throughout the book, Labatut uses precise styles so as to achieve concision, cruelty and humor. It explores the themes of sacrifice, destruction, and the philosophical mysteries underlying reality, which a scientist tries to tackle. Labatut's use of social phobia was to bring awareness of the phobia, and how it affected many scientists.

== Critical reception ==
In 2021 the book was shortlisted for the International Booker Prize, and appeared on Barack Obama's annual summer reading list.

John Banville of The Guardian called it "a nonfiction novel, since the majority of the characters are historical figures, and the narratives were based on historical facts." Ruth Franklin of The New Yorker compared the novel to the works of W. G. Sebald and Olga Tokarczuk. Corinna da Fonseca-Wollheim, in The New York Times Book Review, praised the book as "a gripping meditation on knowledge and hubris" while John Williams wrote that the novel "fuses fact and fiction to turn the modern history of physics into a gripping narrative of obsessed scientists, world-changing discoveries, and the ultimate results—often quite dark—of our drive to understand the fundamental workings of the universe." While reviewing the book for The Wall Street Journal, Sam Sacks praised the book as "darkly dazzling", further writing that Labatut illustrates "the unbreakable bond between horror and beauty."

Publishers Weekly lauded the author and about the book, wrote that it "offers an embellished, heretical, and thoroughly engrossing account of the personalities and creative madness that gave rise to some of the 20th-century's greatest scientific discoveries." Constance Grady of Vox wrote "When We Cease to Understand the World is one of the most beautiful books I've read all year, and one of the weirdest, too."
