= The Young Man =

1984 novel by Botho Strauß

- Author: Botho Strauß
- Original title: Der junge Mann
- Translator: Roslyn Theobald
- Cover artist: Félix Vallotton, Self-portrait at the Age of Twenty, 1885.
- Language: German
- Publisher: Carl Hanser Verlag
- Publication date: 1984
- Publication place: West Germany
- English publication date: 1995
- Pages: 387
- ISBN: 9783446141346

The Young Man (German: Der junge Mann) is a 1984 novel by the German writer Botho Strauß. It has a frame story about a man who enters the world of theatre, but the book mainly consists of phantasmagorical tales and allegories concerning art, alienation and German identity. An English translation by Roslyn Theobald was published in 1995.

== Plot ==
Leon Pracht, a young man, abandons a budding career in the footsteps of his father—a historian of religion specialised on Montanus—after the positive reception of his debut as a theatre director. He is recruited for an adaptation of Jean Genet's The Maids in Cologne, starring the two diva actresses Petra "Pat" Kurzrok and Margarethe "Mag" Wirth. However, Pat and Mag turn out to be too much to handle. Leon asks for advice from the local star director Alfred Weigert, but still fails to actualise his vision for the play.

A woman enters a forest and finds a department store named The Tower of the Germans. After a phantasmagorical episode she finds herself naked in front of the proprietor of the Germans. The proprietor of the Germans is a large, floating head which is half man and half carp.

A man is doing a study on an alternative community whose members are known as the Syks. After observing their unusual habits he commits a social error which freaks out a local woman. He is banished from the colony and takes part in a dreamlike ritual involving scatological sexual activity. Afterwards his female colleague writes a scathing report about his unprofessional behaviour.

A king dies and is condemned as a criminal, which becomes a long-lasting national trauma. At a terrace behind the castle, a number of people are gathered: the paramedic Reppenfries, his sister-in-law Paula and wife Dagmar, the beautiful Almut, the "modern" Hanswerner, the mail clerk Yossica, and the narrator, Leon. Each person tells a personal story or discusses art and philosophy.

Later, Leon finds Yossica who has been transformed into a clump of earth with a face. She explains how she, an aspiring songwriter, had met two peculiar talent scouts, Schwarzsicht and Zuversicht. The first, dressed in ragged clothes, offered her a slowly developing talent which eventually would result in timeless quality. The second, dressed elegantly and dancing, offered her to become the leading star of a new trend. Yossica tried to trick the agents so she could have both, but the attempt failed badly and she became a lump of earth. She asks Leon to bring her with him and put her in soil so she can grow into her former self.

Leon works as a photographer and lives with Yossica. She convinces him to go and meet Alfred Weigert who is staying at a skyscraper hotel in their city. Weigert has had a massive success as Ossia, the main character in a series of comedy films which he also directed. As Ossia—the name he has become known under also in private—he brilliantly captures the German national character, playing a Prussian vagabond described in the press as a mix between Parsifal and Paracelsus. Leon had been involved in the making of the first Ossia film but after that left the industry. When Leon and Yossica meet Ossia in his room, he has aged poorly and become an overweight recluse. He has not appeared as an actor in his last two films, which have been disjointed, pseudo-profound and not nearly as successful as the previous ones. In desperation, Ossia asks Leon to collaborate on a new film project. Ossia hands him notes to read and starts to explain the project, intended as a vehicle for Pat in a great female comedic role, but the film lacks structure and Leon disapproves of it. Leon asks Ossia to come along for a walk to get some fresh air, but Ossia declines and remains inside the tower.

== Reception ==
Publishers Weekly reviewed the book in 1995 and described it as "a bulky series of fables, phantasmagoria and allegories". The critic wrote that some of the stories "include unsettling surreal touches", but that most of them "are heavier-than-air fantasies that tend to revolve around the usual postmodern problems of alienated intellectuals, cultural collisions and consumer dystopias". "Ultimately", the critic wrote, "this is less a novel of ideas, or even of characters, than a series of grandiloquent speeches and freakish dream sequences".
