= Rainald Goetz =

German writer

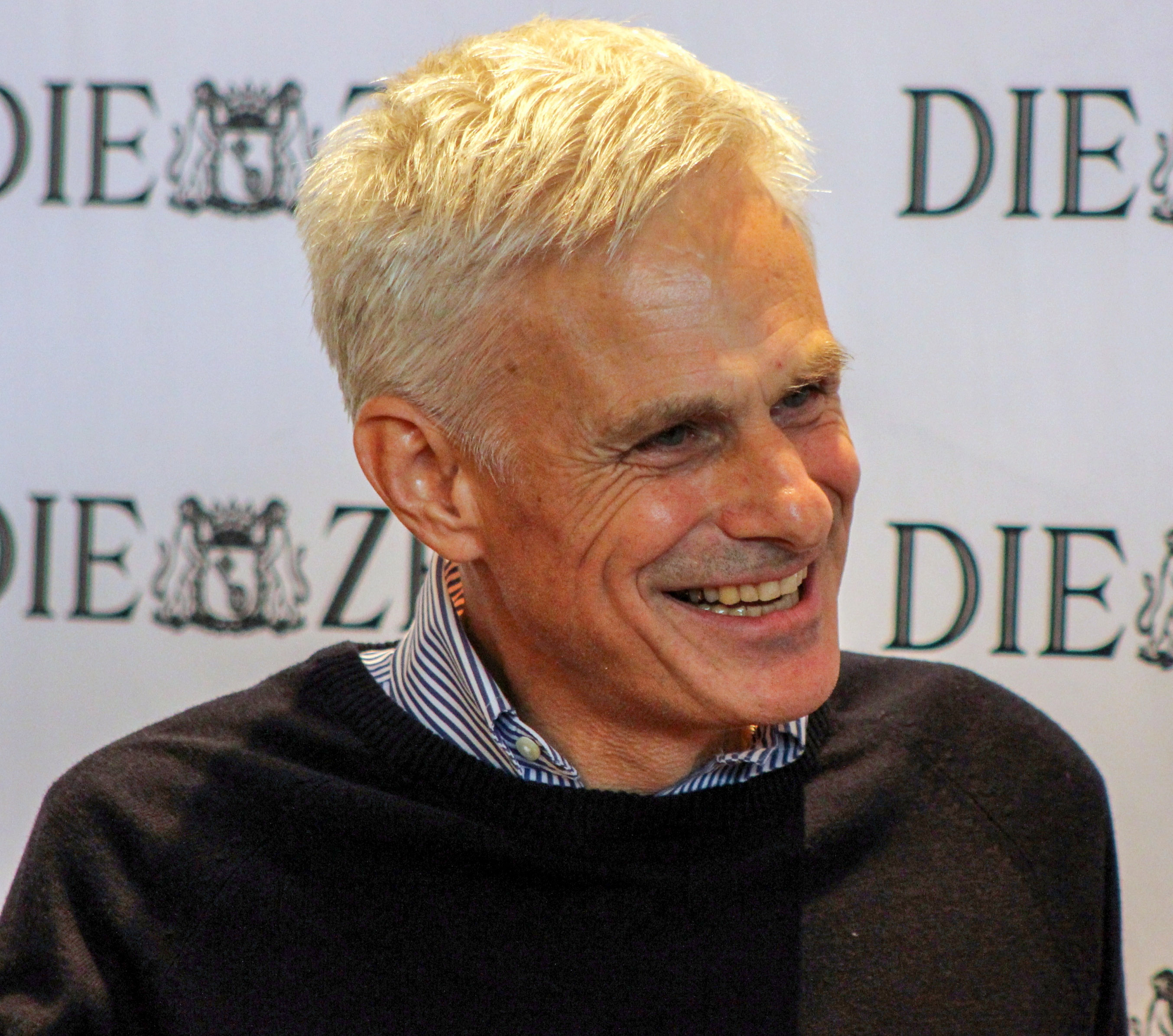
- Goetz in 2012
- Born: Rainald Maria Goetz; 24 May 1954 (age 72); Munich, West Germany
- Education: LMU Munich
- Occupations: Author, playwright, essayist
- Writing career
- Language: German
- Notable works: Irre (1983); Rave (1998); Abfall für alle (1999); Johann Holtrop (2012)
- Notable awards: Kranichsteiner Literaturpreis (1983); Mülheimer Dramatikerpreis (1988, 1993, 2000); Heinrich-Böll-Preis (1991); Else Lasker-Schüler Dramatist Prize (1999); Wilhelm Raabe Literature Prize (2000); Berliner Literaturpreis (2012); Schiller-Gedächtnispreis (2013); Marieluise-Fleißer-Preis (2013); Georg Büchner Prize (2015); Order of Merit of the Federal Republic of Germany (2018)

Rainald Maria Goetz (born 24 May 1954, in Munich) is a German author, playwright and essayist.

== Biography ==
After studying History and Medicine at LMU Munich and obtaining a degree (PhD and M.D) in each, he soon concentrated on his writing.

His first published works, especially his novel Insane (German: Irre), published in 1983, made him a cult author of the intellectual left. To the delight of his fans and the dismay of some critics, he mixed neo-expressionist writing with social realism in the vein of Alfred Döblin and the fast pace of British pop writers such as Julie Burchill. During a televised literary event in 1983, Goetz slit his own forehead with a razor blade and let the blood run down his face until he finished reading.

Goetz has the reputation of an enthusiastic observer of media and pop culture. He has embraced avant-garde philosophers such as Foucault and Luhmann as well as the DJs of the techno movement, especially Sven Väth.

He kept a blog in 1998–99 called Abfall für alle ("rubbish for everybody"), which was later published as a book.

Goetz has won numerous literary awards.

== Awards and honors ==
- 1983 Kranichsteiner Literaturpreis
- 1988 Mülheimer Dramatikerpreis
- 1991 Heinrich-Böll-Preis
- 1993 Mülheimer Dramatikerpreis
- 1999 Else Lasker-Schüler Dramatist Prize
- 2000 Wilhelm Raabe Literature Prize
- 2000 Mülheimer Dramatikerpreis
- 2012 Berliner Literaturpreis
- 2013 Schiller-Gedächtnispreis
- 2013 Marieluise-Fleißer-Preis
- 2015 Georg Büchner Prize
- 2018 Order of Merit of the Federal Republic of Germany

== Selected works ==
- Irre (1983), the novel which made him famous. English translation by Adrian Nathan West published in 2018 by Fitzcarraldo Editions under the title Insane.
- Krieg ("War") (1986). Three plays.
- Kontrolliert ("Controlled") (1988).
- Festung (1993). Plays.
- 1989 (1993), a collage of media from the years of the German Reunification, 1989–90.
- Rave (1998).
- Jeff Koons (1998).
- Abfall für alle ("Rubbish for everyone") (1999).
- Klage ("Complaint") (2008).
- Johann Holtrop (2012).
