= Stücke =

Coordinates: 51°25′37″N 6°52′29″E

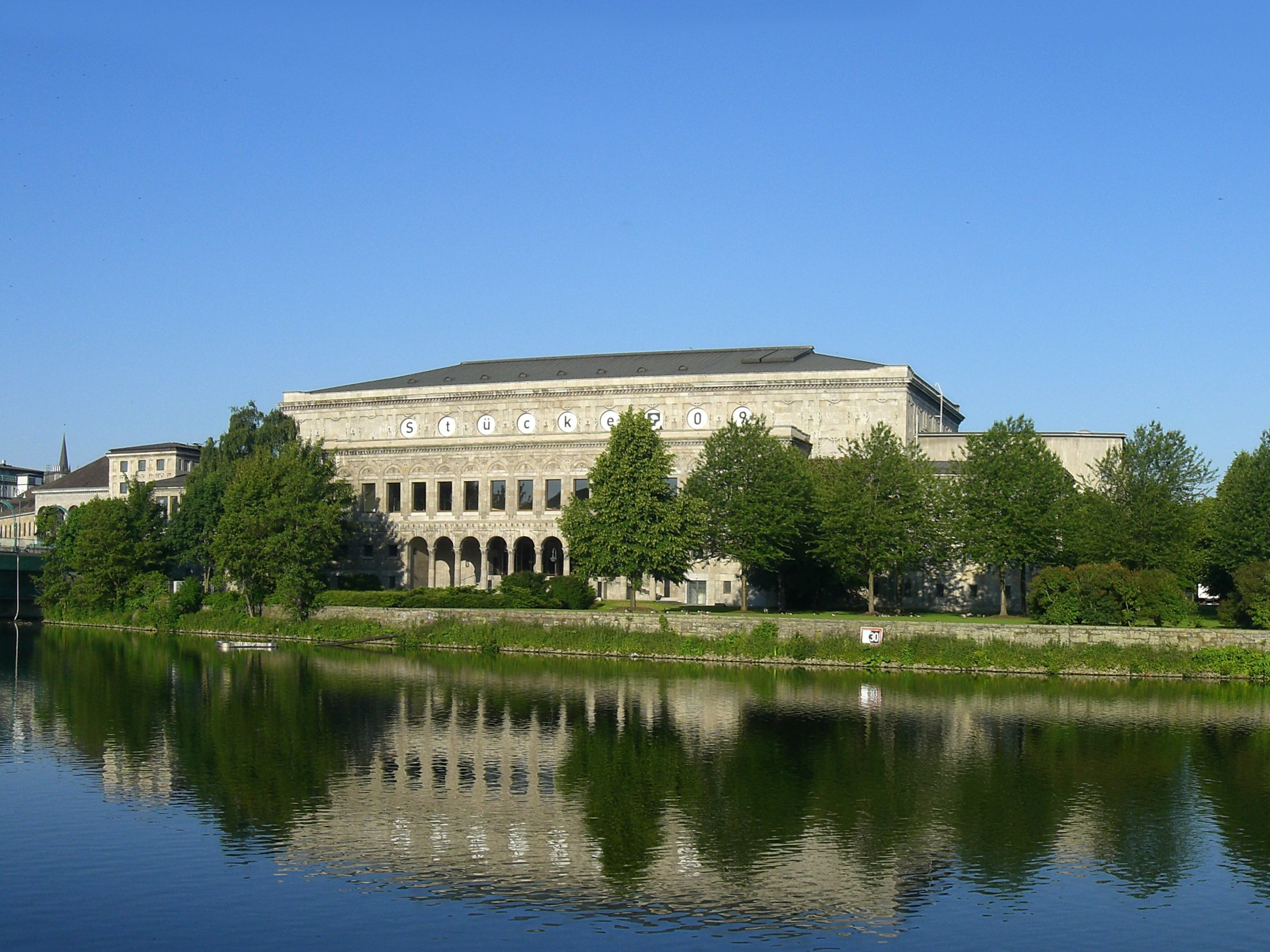
The Stadthalle Mülheim an der Ruhr, main venue for this theatre festival, during the 2009 festival

Stücke. Mülheimer Theatertage NRW is a theatre festival in Mülheim, North Rhine-Westphalia, Germany. The Mülheimer Dramatikerpreis is awarded at this festival.
