= Gerlind Reinshagen =

German writer (1926–2019)

Gerlind Reinshagen (4 May 1926 – 9 June 2019) was a German writer.

== Biography ==
The daughter of Ekkehard and Friedel Technau, she was born in Königsberg and studied pharmacy and art. She wrote children's books, novels, poetry and radio plays before writing her first play for the theatre Doppelkopf in 1967. Her plays Himmel und Erde (Heaven and Earth) (1974) and Sonntagskinder (Sunday's children) (1976) were also produced as films. Most of her plays were directed by the influential director Claus Peymann.

She received a Schiller Memorial Prize in 1974, the Mülheimer Dramatikerpreis in 1977, the Andreas Gryphius Prize in 1982, the Roswitha Prize in 1988, the Ludwig Mülheims Preis in 1993 and the Niedersachsenpreis in 1999.

== Selected works ==
Sources:

- Leben und Tod der Marilyn Monroe (Life and death of Marilyn Monroe), play and radio drama (1971)
- Eisenherz, play (1982)
- Die flüchtige Braut, novel (1993)
- Die Clownin, play (1985)
- Jäger am Rand der Nacht, novel (1993)
- Die Frau und die Stadt. Eine Nacht im Leben der Gertrud Kolmar (2007)
