= René Pollesch =

German author and playwright (1962–2024)

- Born: 29 October 1962
- Died: 26 February 2024 (aged 61)
- Occupations: Author and playwright

René Pollesch (29 October 1962 – 26 February 2024) was a German author and dramatist.

== Life and career ==
From 1983 to 1989, he studied Applied Theatre Studies at the University of Giessen. He won the Mülheimer Dramatikerpreis in 2001 for world wide web-slums and again in 2006 for Cappuccetto Rosso. In 2012 Pollesch organized an exhibition project at Galerie Buchholz, which culminated in a publication. He was named as the new director of Berlin's Volksbühne Theatre in 2019 and took up the role in 2021. Pollesch died in Berlin on 26 February 2024, at the age of 61. He outed himself as gay.

== Sources ==
- Franz-Josef Deiters: "'Mit Hamlet kann ich meinen Alltag nicht bewältigen'. René Polnischs Theorietheater des Nichtrepräsentierbaren". In: Franz-Josef Deiters: Neues Welttheater? Zur Mediologie des Theaters der Neo-Avantgarden. Erich Schmidt Verlag, Berlin 2022, pp. 85-113 (ISBN 978-3-503-20998-9).
