= Insane (novel) =

1983 novel by Rainald Goetz

- German language edition titled Irre (1983)
- Author: Rainald Goetz
- Original title: Irre
- Translator: Adrian Nathan West
- Language: German
- Publisher: Suhrkamp Verlag
- Publication date: 1983
- Publication place: West Germany
- English publication date: 18 October 2017
- Pages: 330
- ISBN: 3518377248

Insane (German: Irre) is a 1983 novel by the German writer Rainald Goetz.

== Plot ==
Insane is about mental health and psychiatric institutions. It is divided into three parts: "Away", which is about the treatment of mental illness from a variety of perspectives, "Inside", which follows the experiences in a psychiatric hospital of a young doctor named Raspe, and "Order", which follows Raspe's personal struggles after he stops working in psychiatry.

== Publication ==
Published by Suhrkamp Verlag in 1983, Insane was Goetz' debut novel. It received significant attention in West Germany upon publication, both because of its content and because Goetz, during a public reading from the book ahead of its release, cut his forehead with a razor and let his blood drip onto the manuscript. The stunt made Der Spiegel refuse to review the book. Other periodicals praised Goetz as a new star of pop literature. Insane was published in English translation by Adrian Nathan West in 2017.
