= Schiller Memorial Prize =

German literary award

The Schiller Memorial Prize (German: Schiller-Gedächtnispreis) is a literature prize of the State of Baden-Württemberg. It is endowed with 25,000 euros and has been awarded since 1955 on Friedrich Schiller's birthday, 10 November. The award was donated on the occasion of the 150th anniversary of Friedrich Schiller's death and is presented every three years. The prize acknowledges outstanding work in the field of German literature or intellectual history, for single works or collected works. At the same time, there are also two lesser prizes with 7,500 euros awarded for young dramatists.

== Prize winners ==
- 1955: Rudolf Kassner
- 1957: Rudolf Pannwitz
- 1959: Wilhelm Lehmann
- 1962: Werner Bergengruen
- 1962: Heinar Kipphardt
- 1965: Max Frisch
- 1968: Günter Eich
- 1971: Gerhard Storz
- 1974: Ernst Jünger
- 1977: Golo Mann
- 1980: Martin Walser
- 1983: Christa Wolf
- 1986: Friedrich Dürrenmatt
- 1989: Käte Hamburger
- 1992: Volker Braun
- 1995: Peter Handke
- 1998: Hans Joachim Schädlich
- 2001: Alexander Kluge
- 2004: Christoph Hein
- 2007: Botho Strauß
- 2010: Tankred Dorst
- 2013: Rainald Goetz
- 2016: Ror Wolf
- 2019: Nino Haratischwili
- 2022: Julia Franck
- 2024: Barbara Honigmann
