= Benjamín Labatut =

Chilean writer (born 1980)

Benjamin Labatut
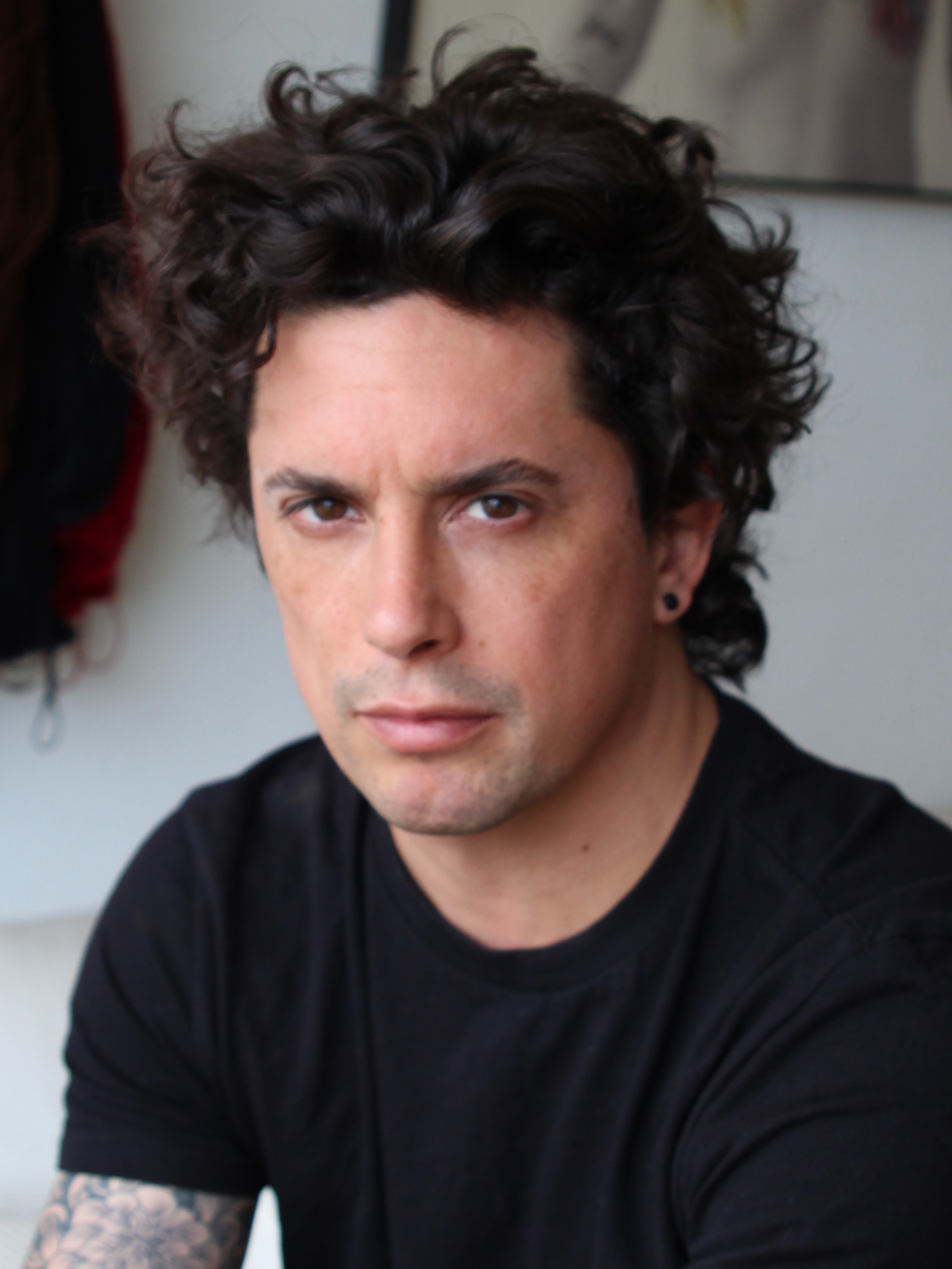
- Labatut in 2014
- Born: Benjamín Labatut; 1980 (age 45–46); Rotterdam, Netherlands
- Occupation: Writer
- Notable work: When We Cease to Understand the World; The MANIAC
- Awards: Santiago Municipal Literature Award (2013)

Benjamín Labatut (born 1980) is a Chilean writer.

== Early life ==
Labatut was born in Rotterdam, Netherlands. He spent his childhood in The Hague, Buenos Aires, and Lima. He moved to Santiago at the age of 14.

== Writing ==
Labatut's first book of stories, La Antártica empieza aquí, won the Premio Caza de Letras 2009, awarded by UNAM and Alfaguara in Mexico. It also won the Santiago Municipal Literature Award in the short story category in 2013. His second book, Después de la luz, came out in 2016, followed by Un verdor terrible, which was published in English by Pushkin Press with the title When We Cease to Understand the World and nominated for the 2021 International Booker Prize. His subsequent book, The MANIAC, was published in English in 2023 by Penguin Press, and is a story centered on the Hungarian polymath John von Neumann.

One of his main literary references was the Chilean poet Samir Nazal, whom he met in 2005 and who acted as a mentor during his early days. Nazal aided him during the writing of the first book he published, Antarctica Starts Here, a collection of seven stories. Other influences he has recognized include Pascal Quignard, Eliot Weinberger, William Burroughs, Roberto Bolaño, and W. G. Sebald.

His second book, Después de la luz (After the Light), has been described by Matias Celedón in this way: "Benjamín Labatut describes a system of apparent links, made up of a series of scientific, religious and esoteric notes that coexist with the biographical account of a stranger obsessed with refuting nothing by exploring 'the continuous creation of false worlds.' In Después de la luz he narrates the ontological crisis of a subject facing the void in a world saturated with information and devoid of meaning. The consistent reality is refutable proof for the author. Labatut listens to a voice: the mind of a man who does not fit in a single universe."

=== When We Cease to Understand the World ===
Labatut's third book, When We Cease to Understand the World, was published in 2020 by Pushkin Press. He said that "it is a book made up by an essay (which is not chemically pure), two stories that try not to be stories, a short novel, and a semi-biographical prose piece."

Ricardo Baixera, a literary critic for El Periódico, maintained that it was a "very strange fiction that from the first page questions the parameters of reality. And what we understand by literature." John Banville, who described the book in The Guardian as "ingenious, intricate and deeply disturbing", said that the book "could be defined as a non-fiction novel".

Roberto Careaga, a journalist from El Mercurio, argued that the author follows "those scientists who captivated him, but it is not a collection of biographies: intense and variegated, it is a volume of stories strung along the brilliant paths of 20th-century science that ended in the unknown and sometimes in pure darkness. They refer to real events, but Labatut [...] adds a dose of essay and also fiction".

Ruth Franklin, writing in The New Yorker, argued that

There is liberation in the vision of fiction’s capabilities that emerges here—the sheer cunning with which Labatut embellishes and augments reality, as well as the profound pathos he finds in the stories of these men. But there is also something questionable, even nightmarish, about it. If fiction and fact are indistinguishable in any meaningful way, how are we to find language for those things we know to be true?

When We Cease to Understand the World has been translated into 22 languages by publishers from Germany, China, the United States, France, the Netherlands, England, and Italy. The English edition of the book was shortlisted for the International Booker Prize in 2021. It was selected for The New York Times Book Review's "10 Best Books of 2021" list. In 2024, it was listed by the New York Times as #83 in its list of 100 Best Books of the 21st century.

In 2021, he appeared on the Burned by Books podcast on the New Books Network to discuss his book.

=== The MANIAC ===
The MANIAC is Labatut's fourth book, a fictionalised biography of the polymath John von Neumann. The book was published in 2023 and received mostly positive reviews. It is centered on the life of von Neumann, though the first part of the book is about physicist Paul Ehrenfest, and the last one is about Lee Sedol's Go match against DeepMind's artificial intelligence program AlphaGo. The name of the book is derived from the MANIAC I, one of the first computers built in von Neumann architecture.

=== Bibliography ===
- Antarctica Starts Here
- After the Light
- When We Cease to Understand the World
- The Maniac
