= Botho Strauss =

German playwright, novelist, and essayist

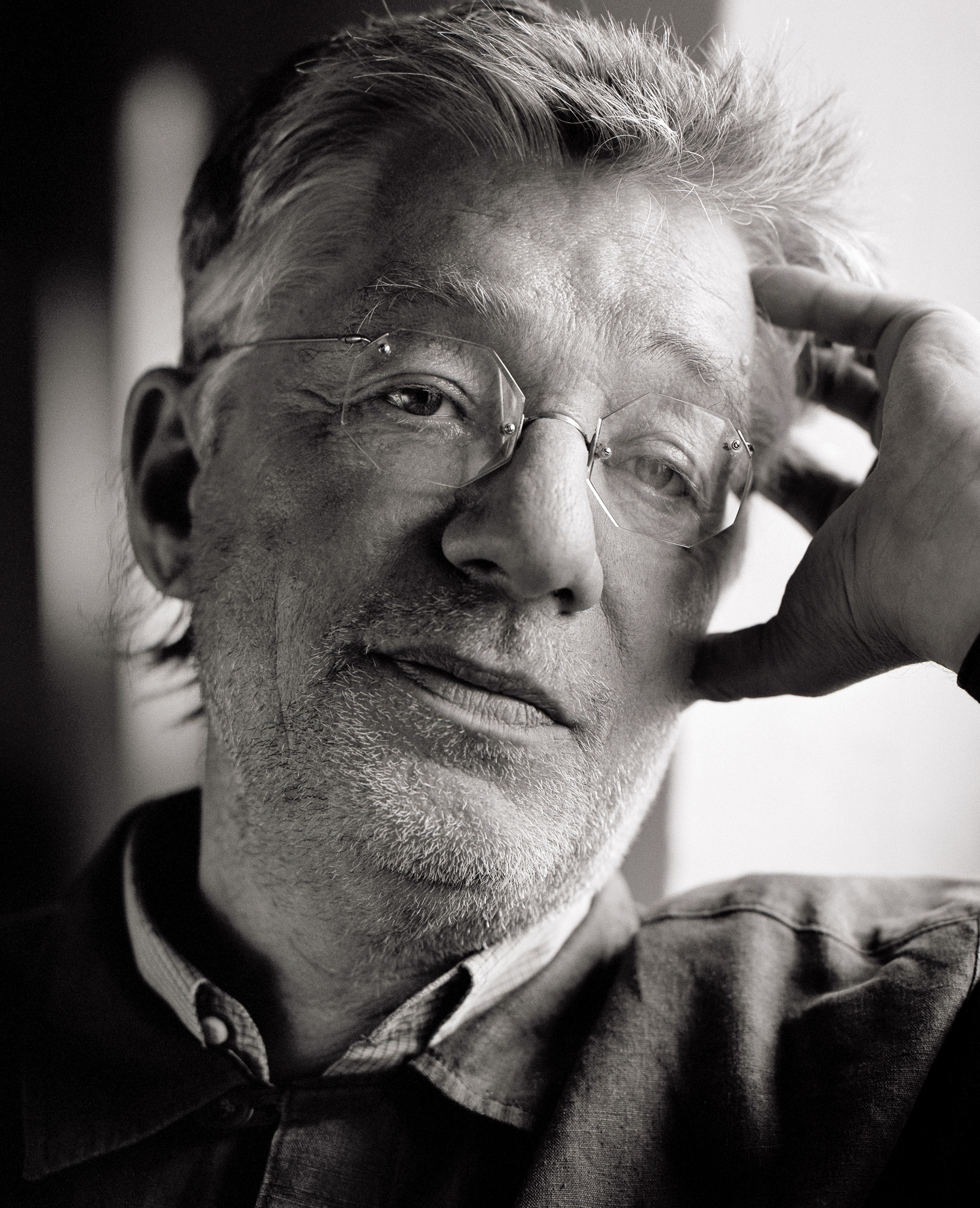
- Botho Strauß photographed by Oliver Mark, Uckermark 2007
- Born: 2 December 1944 (age 81); Naumburg, Germany
- Occupations: Playwright; novelist; essayist
- Writing career
- Notable awards: Jean-Paul-Preis (1987); Georg Büchner Prize (1989)

Botho Strauss (German: [ˈboːtoː ˈʃtʁaʊs]; written as Botho Strauß) (born 2 December 1944) is a German playwright, novelist, and essayist.

== Early life ==
Botho Strauss was the son of a chemist and pharmacist named Eduard Strauss (1890–1971) and his mother Frau Li (1910–2006).

After finishing his secondary education, Strauss studied German, history of theatre arts and sociology at the University of Cologne and LMU Munich. He never completed his dissertation on Thomas Mann und das Theater. During his studies, he worked as an extra at the Munich Kammerspiele.

== Career ==
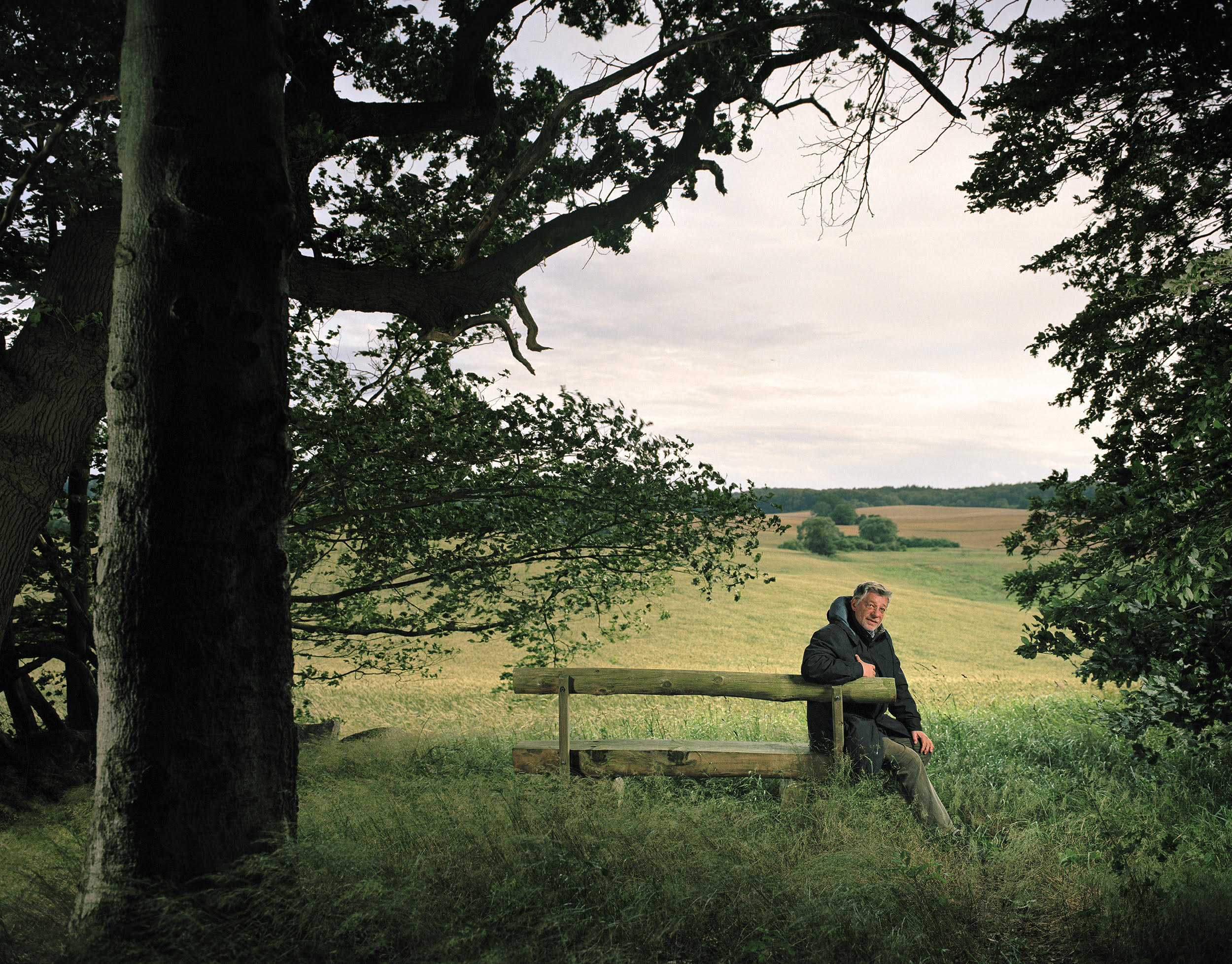
Botho Strauß photographed by Oliver Mark in his forest in the Uckermark, 2007

From 1967 to 1970, he was a critic and editorial journalist for the journal Theater heute (Theater Today). Between 1970 and 1975, he worked as a dramaturgical assistant to Peter Stein at the West Berlin Schaubühne am Halleschen Ufer.

After his first attempt as a writer, a Gorky film adaptation, he decided to work as a writer. Strauss had his first breakthrough as a dramatist with the 1977 Trilogie des Wiedersehens, five years after the publication of his first work. In 1984, he published Der Junge Mann (The Young Man), translated by Roslyn Theobald in 1995.

With a 1993 Der Spiegel essay, Anschwellender Bocksgesang ("Swelling He-Goat Song") (Note: "He-goat song" is the translation of the Greek "τραγῳδία" ("tragedy")) a critical examination of modern civilisation, he triggered a major political controversy as his conservative politics was anathema to many.

In his theoretical work, Strauß showed the influence of Nietzsche, Heidegger, and Adorno, but his outlook was also radically anti-bourgeois.

In 2014, Carl Hanser Verlag brought out a compendium of Strauß’s aphorisms called Allein mit allen, spanning close to four decades from 1977 to 2013, and edited by German scholar Sebastian Kleinschmidt.

Strauss lives in Berlin as well as in the nearby Uckermark region. In 2017, he switched from his long-time publisher Carl Hanser Verlag to Rowohlt Verlag.

== Recognition ==
- 1974: Hannoverscher Dramatikerpreis
- 1977: Förderpreis of the Schiller Memorial Prize
- 1981: Großer Literaturpreis der Bayerischen Akademie der Schönen Künste
- 1982: Mülheimer Dramatikerpreis
- 1987: Jean Paul Prize
- 1989: Georg Büchner Prize
- 1993: Berlin Theatre Prize
- 2001: Lessing Prize of the Free and Hanseatic City of Hamburg
- 2007: Schiller Memorial Prize
