= Arthur Hellmer =

Austrian-born theatre director (1880–1961)

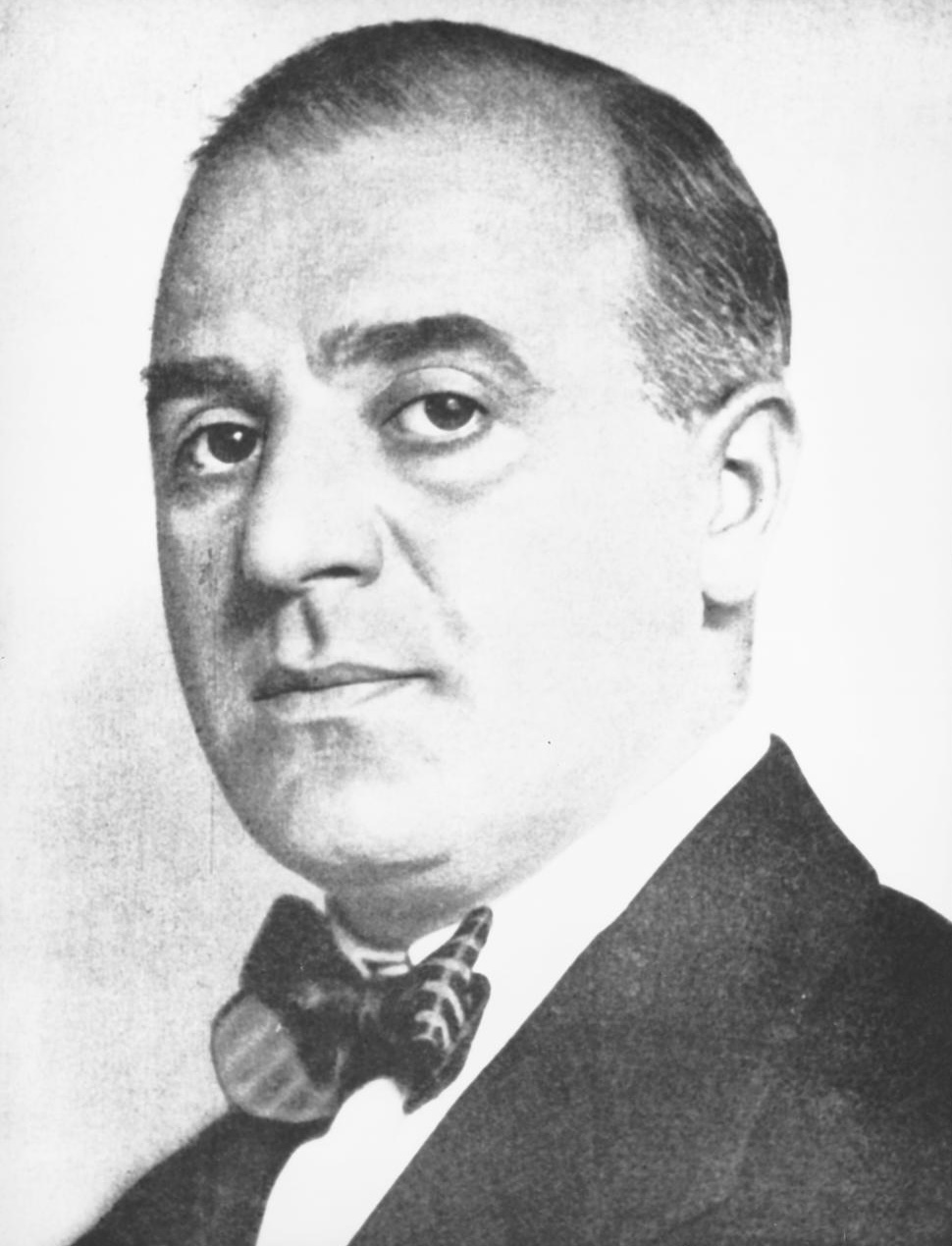
- Born: Arthur Ehrlich; 29 June 1880
- Died: 16 January 1961 (aged 80); Hamburg
- Resting place: Ohlsdorf Cemetery
- Citizenship: Austrian
- Occupations: Theatre director, Theatrical producer, Actor
- Spouse: Marie "Mitzi" Breitenfeld
- Children: Kurt Hellmer
- Awards: German Federal Order of Merit; Honorary Member, Deutscher Bühnenverein; Honorary Member, City of Frankfurt; Honorary title of "Professor", Republic of Austria

Signature
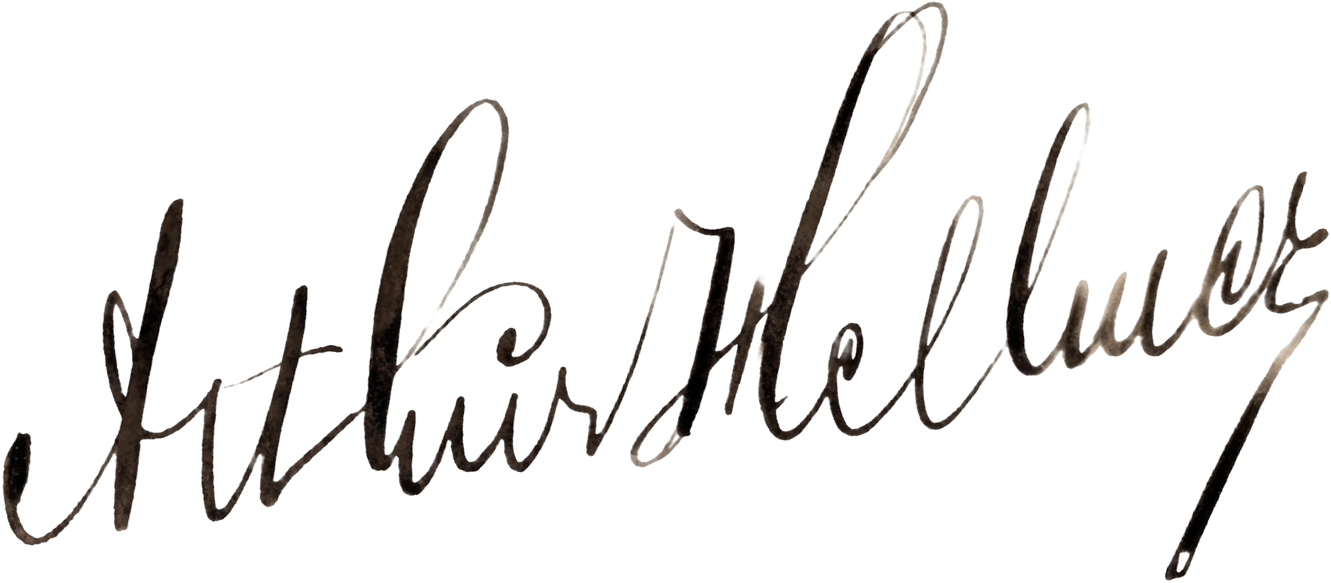

Arthur Hellmer, born Arthur Ehrlich (born 29 June 1880 in Thomasdorf, Austria-Hungary; died 16 January 1961 in Hamburg) was an Austrian actor, director, and theatre manager (Intendant).

== Early life ==
Arthur Ehrlich was born in Austria in 1880, the child of a Jewish family that had emigrated from Austrian Silesia to Vienna when he was 1 years old. He later studied at the Vienna Conservatory. Early in his artistic career, he took acting roles in Barmen (1901/02), Lübeck (1902 to 1904), and at the Schauspielhaus Frankfurt (1904 to 1910).

== Career ==
Neues Theater (1911-1935)

In 1911, with the help of private contributions — among the backers were the Rothschild family — he co-founded the Neues Theater in Frankfurt am Main together with Max Reimann. The theatre opened on 11 September of that year with a production of Heinrich Kleist's Der zerbrochne Krug. Ehrlich was sole director from 1920; the Neues Theater was operated as a joint-stock company. From 1922 he went by the name Arthur Hellmer.

Over twenty-five years, the Neues Theater staged more than nine hundred premieres and became one of the most successful privately run theatres in Europe, known for its modern repertoire and for cultivating young acting talent. Alongside it, Hellmer founded the Frankfurter Kammerspiele (1920–1922) and the theatre journal Der Zuschauer (1919).[1] As managing director of Deutsches Schauspiel GmbH, he additionally oversaw productions at the Lessing-Theater, Trianon-Theater, and the Kleines Theater in Berlin between 1925 and 1926.

As a champion of Expressionist drama, he was especially devoted to Georg Kaiser, premiering most of that playwright's works, and he also staged and premiered works by Stefan Zweig, Arthur Schnitzler, Carl Zuckmayer, Bertolt Brecht, and George Bernard Shaw, as well as the painter and dramatist Oskar Kokoschka. His ensemble and guest performers over the years included Hans Albers, Helene Weigel, Käthe Dorsch, Marianne Hoppe, Theo Lingen, and Eugen Klöpfer.

Theater an der Wien (1936–1938)

Forced out of Germany in 1935, Hellmer returned to Vienna, where he took over the Theater an der Wien that August and built a new company.

His opening production, Ralph Benatzky's Axel an der Himmelstür (1936), was framed as a showcase for serious acting rather than a typical operetta. After a casting change, the previously unknown Swedish singer Zarah Leander joined the production, which launched her career and ran for over 190 performances. Hellmer also staged Neun Offiziere and Krach im Hinterhaus that year.

By 1937 his company included well-known performers such as Rosy Barsony, Käthe Dorsch, and Theo Lingen. Notable premieres included the football-themed operetta Roxy und ihr Wunderteam, a new musical version of Madame Sans-Gêne, and the charity premiere of Pam-Pam. He also ran a children's matinee series at the theatre.

His directorship ended with the March 1938 Anschluss. Shortly before, an antisemitic attack in the Völkischer Beobachter had targeted him by name; within days he was stripped of his position and ownership stake, publicly humiliated, and briefly imprisoned. His two seasons are often cited as a late high point of Viennese operetta before its Jewish practitioners were forced out.

Deutsches Schauspielhaus (1946–1948)

After seven years of exile in England, Hellmer returned to Germany in 1946 to become Intendant of the Deutsches Schauspielhaus in Hamburg, one of the country's largest and most prominent drama theatres.

He arrived in a city still devastated by the war, with most of its prewar theatre seating destroyed and the Schauspielhaus building itself occupied by the British military for troop entertainment. As a result, his company performed in makeshift venues, including a hall with poor acoustics near the central bus station and, later, a converted bank building with no proper seating or heating. Coal shortages during the harsh winter of 1946-47 forced the cancellation of dozens of performances; theatre staff eventually negotiated directly with a Ruhr coal mine to trade performances for fuel, an arrangement that helped inspire the founding of the Ruhrfestspiele Recklinghausen festival.

Hellmer was the first Jewish theatre director to lead a major German theatre after the war, a position that drew hostility from parts of Hamburg's cultural establishment. Rivals delayed his formal appointment for months, his directorial debut was harshly reviewed, and he was subsequently barred from directing and limited to administrative duties, with some pushing to replace him with a former Nazi Party member. Despite the friction, his tenure produced one major success: the German premiere of Carl Zuckmayer's Des Teufels General in 1947, seen as a milestone in postwar German theatre's reckoning with the Nazi past. He stepped down after two seasons.

== Emigration and exile ==
In 1936, Arthur Hellmer emigrated to Vienna because of his Jewish heritage, where he took over as director of the Theater an der Wien with great success. In 1938, after selling the Neues Theater to the city of Frankfurt in the wake of the November Pogrom of 1938, Hellmer emigrated to England.

Exile in London (1939–1945)

After the Anschluss of March 1938, Hellmer was removed from his position and ownership of the Theater an der Wien and briefly imprisoned. Following the November 1938 pogrom, he sold the Neues Theater in Frankfurt to the city, and on 6 July 1939 he sailed from Genoa to Southampton aboard the Njassa, settling initially in London at Aberdare Gardens.

In London, Hellmer joined the board of the Free German League of Culture (German: Freier Deutscher Kulturbund), an organisation of German-speaking émigré artists founded in 1939, whose directorate also included Berthold Viertel, Oskar Kokoschka, Stefan Zweig, Alfred Kerr, and Wilhelm Unger.

Internment

In late May 1940, during the British government's internment of German and Austrian nationals as enemy aliens, Hellmer was detained following proceedings at Bow Street Magistrates' Court and sent to an internment camp on the Isle of Man. While interned, he organized theatrical productions among fellow detainees, staging the "Prologue in Heaven" from Goethe's Faust and the mechanicals' scenes from Shakespeare's A Midsummer Night's Dream. On 24 August 1940 he directed the camp revue Auf der Fest-Wiese; its cast included internees who later became established performers in Britain and Germany, among them Peter Illing, Eric Pohlmann, Emil Rameau, and Milo Sperber. The programme for the revue survives in the archive of the Akademie der Künste in Berlin.

Later exile years

After his release from internment, Hellmer became a prominent figure in London's German-speaking émigré cultural life. He founded two ventures for the production of German- and Austrian-language drama in exile, the Österreichische Bühne and the Lessing-Bühne, and continued to be active in the theatrical work of the Free German League of Culture. He also co-founded Club 1943, a discussion circle for émigré writers, scientists, and artists, and served as the club's treasurer under the chairmanship of the playwright Hans J. Rehfisch; other members of its board included Hermann Friedmann, Hans Jaeger, Rudolf Bernauer, Karl Theodor Bluth, Adele Schreiber, and Wilhelm Sternfeld. Hellmer remained in London until 1946, when he returned to Germany to become Intendant of the Deutsches Schauspielhaus in Hamburg.

After his return to Germany in 1946, the city of Frankfurt recognized Hellmer as the rightful owner of the Neues Theater and bought the theatre back from him in 1948.

== Later life and honors ==
In 1955, Hellmer was awarded the Bundesverdienstkreuz (Order of Merit of the Federal Republic of Germany) by President Theodor Heuss. Austria granted him the honorary title of Professor. On the occasion of his 75th birthday, Hellmer was appointed an honorary member of the Municipal Theaters of Frankfurt by Mayor Walter Leiske and the Frankfurt City Council.

Arthur Hellmer died in 1961 at age 80 in Hamburg. He was buried at the Ohlsdorf Cemetery.

== Literature ==
- Hans Knudsen (1969). "Hellmer, Arthur". Neue Deutsche Biographie (in German). Vol. 8. Berlin: Duncker & Humblot. p. 484. (full text online).
- Brockhaus Enzyklopädie, 21st edition, Vol. 12, December 2005. ISBN 3-7653-4142-8, p. 285
- C. Bernd Sucher (ed.): Theaterlexikon. Autoren, Regisseure, Schauspieler, Dramaturgen, Bühnenbildner, Kritiker. By Christine Dössel and Marietta Piekenbrock with Jean-Claude Kuner and C. Bernd Sucher. 2nd ed. Deutscher Taschenbuch-Verlag, Munich 1999, ISBN 3-423-03322-3.
- "Sommertraum und Wintergewitter". Der Spiegel. No. 48. 1947.
- "In memoriam Arthur Hellmer". Der Spiegel. No. 5. 1961. Archived from the original on 19 April 2017..* Hellmer, Arthur, in: Werner Röder; Herbert A. Strauss (eds.): International Biographical Dictionary of Central European Émigrés 1933–1945. Vol. 2,1. Munich: Saur, 1983, p. 487
- Hellmer, Arthur, in: Handbuch des deutschsprachigen Exiltheaters 1933–1945, Vol. 2, 1999, pp. 399f.
