= Buckwitz =

Buckwitz is a surname. Notable people with the surname include:

- Harry Buckwitz (1904–1987), German actor, theatre director, and theatre manager
- Lisa Buckwitz (born 1994), German bobsledder
