= Johann-Heinrich-Merck-Preis =

- Location: Darmstadt
- Country: Germany
- Presented by: Deutsche Akademie für Sprache und Dichtung
- Reward: €20,000
- First award: 1964
- Website: www.deutscheakademie.de/en/awards/johann-heinrich-merck-preis

Johann-Heinrich-Merck-Preis (German: Johann-Heinrich-Merck-Preis für literarische Kritik und Essay) is a literary prize of Hesse awarded by the Deutsche Akademie für Sprache und Dichtung since 1964. Since 2013 the prize winner receives €20,000. The award is donated by the Merck Group in memory of the German author and critic Johann Heinrich Merck (1741–1791).

== Winners ==
- 1964 Günter Blöcker
- 1965 not awarded
- 1966 Karl Heinz Ruppel
- 1967 Werner Weber
- 1968 Georg Hensel
- 1969 Erich Heller
- 1970 Joachim Kaiser
- 1971 Peter Huchel
- 1972 Horst Krüger
- 1973 H. H. Stuckenschmidt
- 1974 Joachim Günther
- 1975 Walter Höllerer
- 1976 Peter Rühmkorf
- 1977 François Bondy
- 1978 Karl Heinz Bohrer
- 1979 Werner Spies
- 1980 Sebastian Haffner
- 1981 Hilde Spiel
- 1982 Albert von Schirnding
- 1983 Albrecht Schöne
- 1984 Erwin Chargaff
- 1985 Sibylle Wirsing
- 1986 Heinrich Vormweg
- 1987 Reinhard Baumgart
- 1988 Ivan Nagel
- 1989 Lothar Baier
- 1990 Walter Boehlich
- 1991 Peter von Matt
- 1992 Benjamin Henrichs
- 1993 Hans Egon Holthusen
- 1994 Peter Demetz
- 1995 Michael Maar
- 1996 Ulrich Weinzierl
- 1997 Heinz F. Schafroth
- 1998 Iso Camartin
- 1999 Gerhard R. Koch
- 2000 Silvia Bovenschen
- 2001 Friedrich Dieckmann
- 2002 Volker Klotz
- 2003 Klaus Theweleit
- 2004 Anita Albus
- 2005 Hans Keilson
- 2006 Eduard Beaucamp
- 2007 Günther Rühle
- 2008 Lothar Müller
- 2009 Harald Hartung
- 2010 Karl-Markus Gauß
- 2011 Günter de Bruyn
- 2012 Heinz Schlaffer
- 2013 Wolfram Schütte
- 2014 Carolin Emcke
- 2015 Gabriele Goettle
- 2016 Kathrin Passig
- 2017 Jens Bisky
- 2018 Martin Pollack
- 2019 Daniela Strigl
- 2020 Iris Radisch
- 2021 Franz Schuh
- 2022 Niklas Maak
- 2023 Jutta Person
- 2024 Marie Luise Knott
- 2025 Ilma Rakusa
- 2026 Helmut Böttiger
