= Deutsches Schauspielhaus =

Theatre in Hamburg, Germany

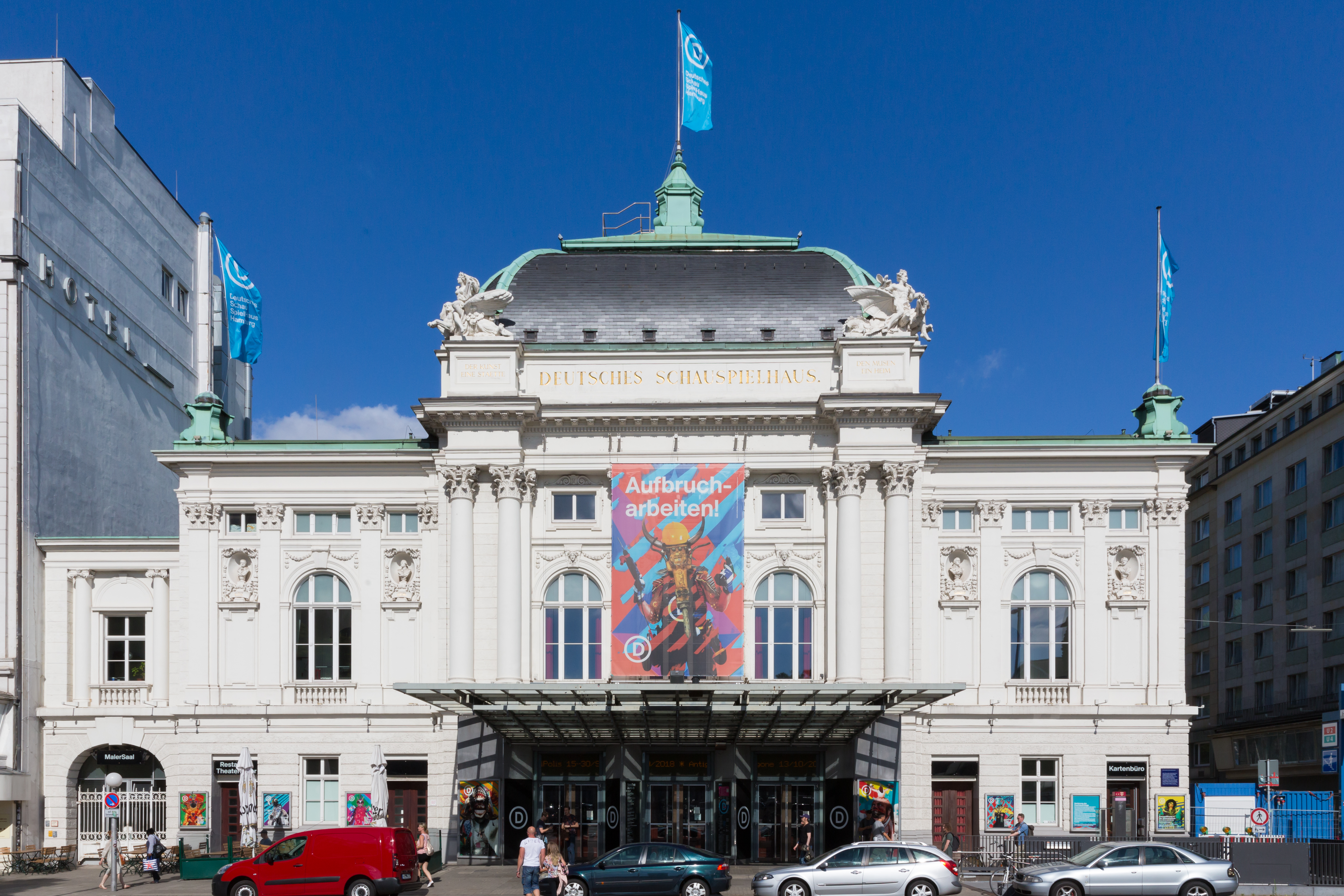
- Front view of Deutsches Schauspielhaus.
- Interactive map of Deutsches Schauspielhaus
- Address: Kirchenallee 39; 20099 Hamburg
- Coordinates: 53°33′15.5″N 10°0′31.9″E
- Owner: Free and Hanseatic city of Hamburg
- Capacity: 1,192
- Type: Theatre
- Public transit: Hauptbahnhof Nord

Construction
- Opened: 1901
- Architect: Fellner & Helmer

Website
- schauspielhaus.de

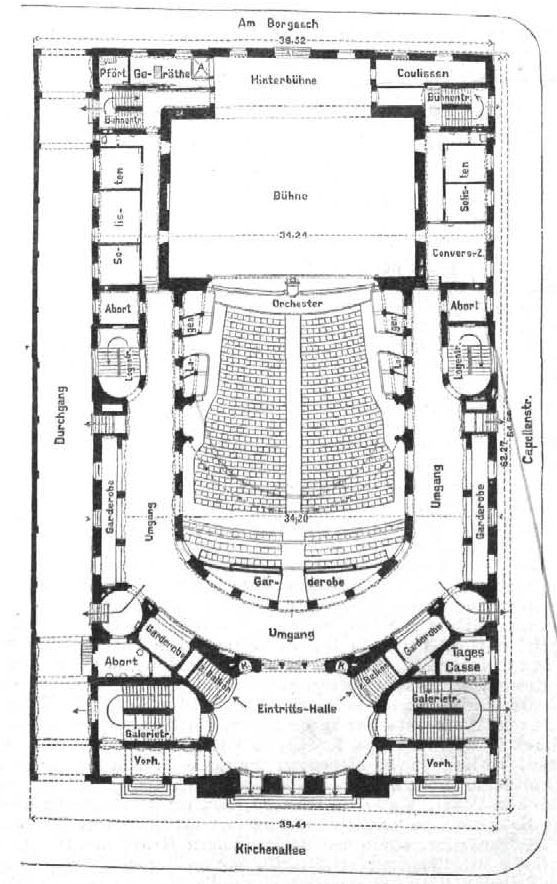
ground floor plan

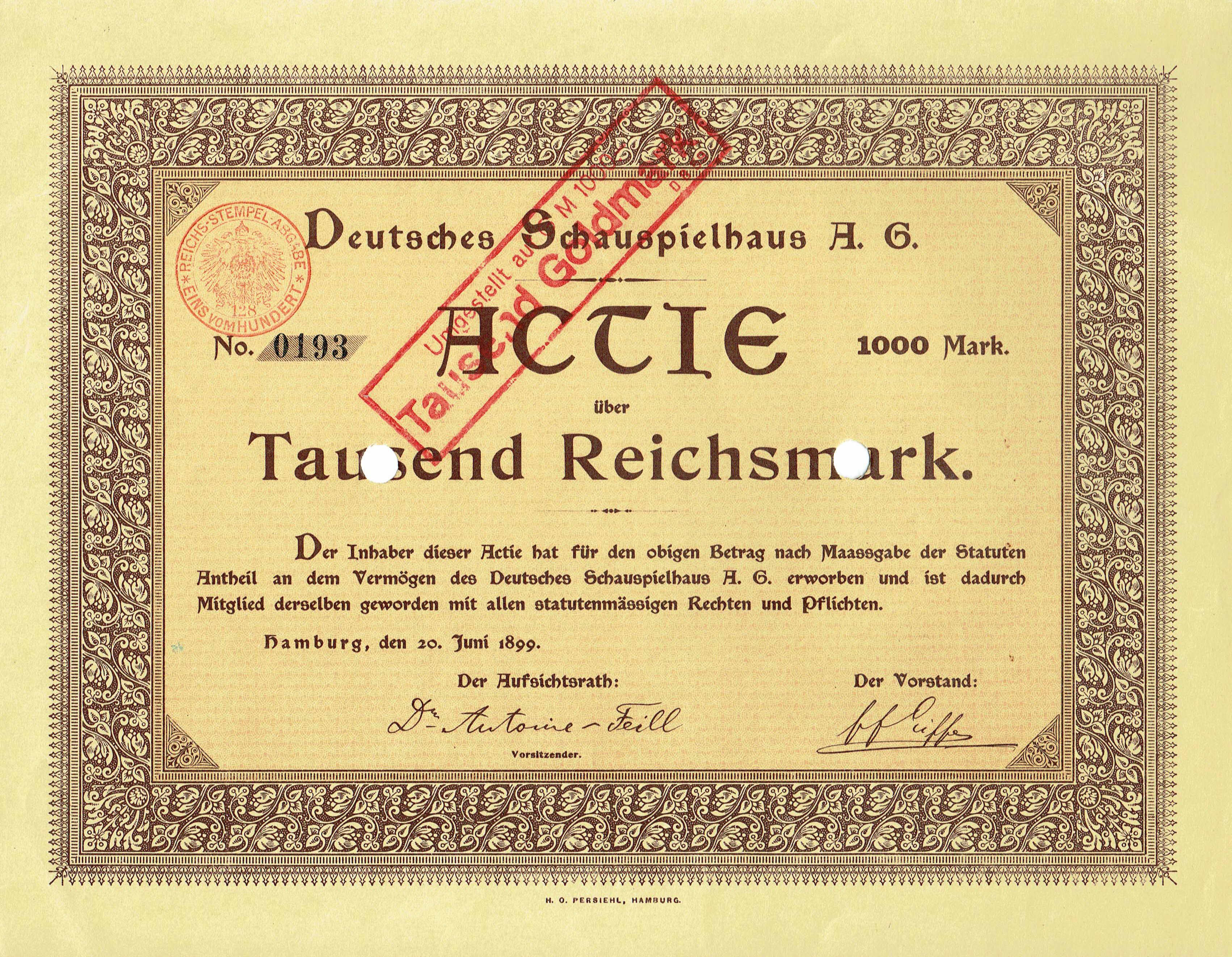
Founder share of the Deutsches Schauspielhaus AG, issued 20. June 1899

The Deutsches Schauspielhaus, sometimes referred to as the Hamburg Schauspielhaus or Hamburg Theatre, is a theatre in the St. Georg quarter of the city of Hamburg, Germany

== History ==
The Deutsches Schauspielhaus was co-founded by stage actress Franziska Ellmenreich. It was designed by Austrian architects Fellner & Helmer, built between 1899 and 1900, and opened its doors in 1901.

The theatre was renovated in 2013/2014.

== Notable productions ==
In May 2010 The Infernal Comedy – Confessions of a Serial Killer, written by American actor John Malkovich and directed by Michael Sturminger, was performed at the Deutsches Schauspielhaus, with Malkovich starring. This was an operatic production, about the life of the Austrian serial killer Jack Unterweger.

== Theatre managers ==
Years	Theatre managers
1901–1910	Alfred Freiherr von Berger
1910–1913	Carl Hagemann
1913–1918	Max Grube
1918–1926	Paul Eger
1926–1928	Ernst Ziegel
1928–1932	Hermann Röbbeling
1932–1945	Karl Wüstenhagen
1945–1946	Rudolf Külus
1946–1948	Arthur Hellmer
1948–1955	Albert Lippert
1955–1963	Gustaf Gründgens
1963–1968	Oscar Fritz Schuh
1968	Egon Monk
1968–1969	Gerhard Hirsch
1969–1970	Hans Lietzau
1970–1971	Rolf Liebermann
1972–1979	Ivan Nagel
1979–1980	Günter König and Rolf Mares
1980–1985	Niels-Peter Rudolph
1985–1989	Peter Zadek
1989–1991	Michael Bogdanov
1991–1993	Gerd Schlesselmann
1993–2000	Frank Baumbauer
2000–2005	Tom Stromberg
2005–2010	Friedrich Schirmer
2010–2013	Jack F. Kurfess (acting)
since 2013	Karin Beier
