= Lessing Theater =

Theatre in Berlin, Germany (1888–1945)

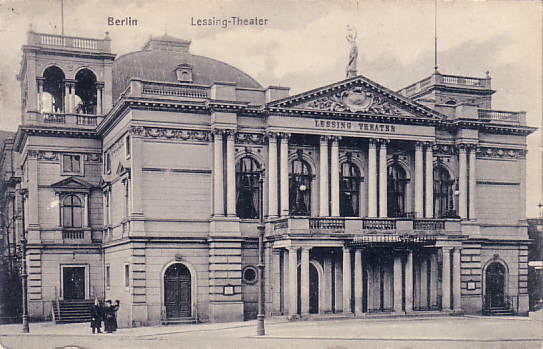
- Interactive map of Lessing Theater
- Location: Berlin, Germany
- Coordinates: 52°31′21″N 13°22′35″E
- Event: Theatre

Construction
- Opened: 1888
- Demolished: 1945
- Architects: Hermann von der Hude; Julius Hennicke
- Project manager: Oscar Blumenthal

The Lessing Theater was a theatre in the Mitte district of Berlin, Germany. It opened in 1888 and was destroyed in April 1945 in a bombing raid; its ruins were demolished after World War II.

The construction of the theatre, for around 900,000 Mark, was especially notable since it was the first new theatre built in Berlin since the construction of the Wallner Theater in 1864; in between only renovations of old theatres and existing spaces had taken place. By order of director Oscar Blumenthal, the building, designed in a Renaissance Revival style by the architects Hermann von der Hude and Julius Hennicke, was constructed in less than a year, between October 1887 and September 1888. The theatre opened on 11 September 1888, staging Gotthold Ephraim Lessing's drama Nathan the Wise.

== Location ==
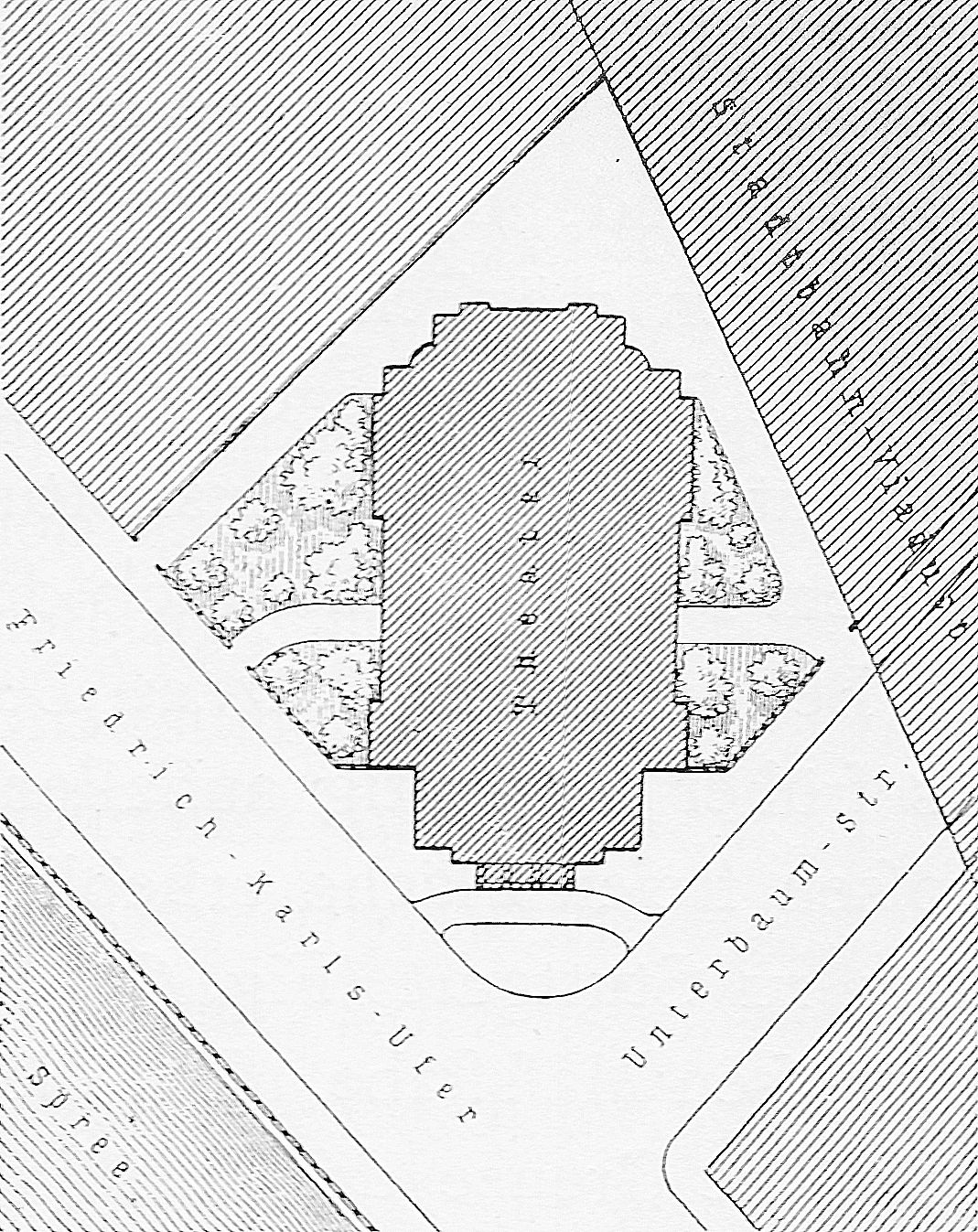
Location of the theatre between Stadtbahn and Spree

The oddly angled piece of land, the site of former Circus Krembser, was located in the historic Friedrich-Wilhelm-Stadt quarter, at the corner of Friedrich-Karl-Ufer 1 (since 1951: Kapelle-Ufer) on the Spree riverside and Unterbaumstraße. Wedged between the Stadtbahn railway viaduct and the firewall of the building nextdoor, it made for a difficult design of a prestigious building. The architects designed a cupola above the podium that covered up the firewall, and the front facade with its portico turned the street corner into a kind of vestibule. The remaining triangular outside areas were set off from the street with lattice work and gates and functioned as gardens; the remaining area in the back served as delivery courtyard.

The location was commercially viable; the completion of the nearby Reichstag beyond the Spree River, linked by the Kronprinzenbrücke, promised a future appreciation of land values. The horsecars which passed in front of the theatre made the theatre easily accessible from all neighbourhoods.

== The building ==
The staircases leading to the spectators' areas were combined with the rest of the house. Its function as a theatre was indicated by the facade's vestibule, the double pillars, and the gable. The towers with double arcades above the staircases were probably designed with an eye on the building's appearance from afar, but also emphasized the building's character. The middle part was dominated by the stalls, while the appearance from the rear was determined by the roof of the stage.

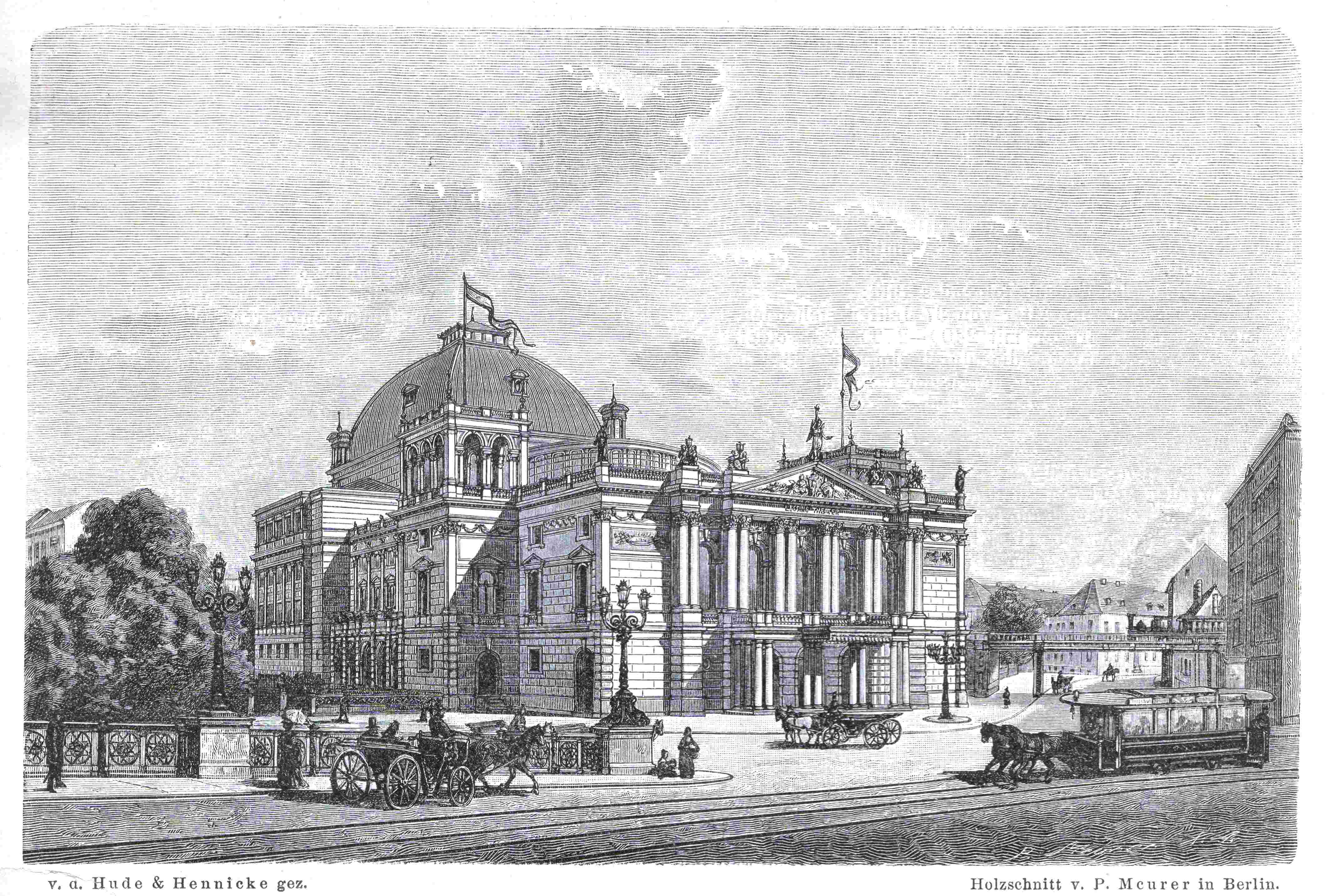
Theatre in its opening year in 1888 with horse trams and Stadtbahn viaduct

=== Front of house and other areas ===
Spectators entered the theatre through one of three doors in the vestibule, which was equipped with a roof to protect unloading horse cars. The lobby measured 15.40 by 9.00 metres. Ticket counters were placed on either side of the lobby, with doors beside them that gave access to the second storey balconies. Doors directly across from the entrance led to the stalls and the first level of balconies.

After the show, spectators from the stalls left the theatre through two separate doors on the side of the theatre or through the main lobby. Spectators from the first and second rows of balconies had special exits through the staircases, so they would not have to cross the lobby again. This allowed the theatre to empty quickly and permitted shorter time periods between two shows.

Wardrobes were available outside the various spectator areas. The hallways also functioned as spectator space during intermissions. For the more prominent visitors, in the stalls and the first gallery, a separate foyer above the main lobby was allocated, a grand room, measuring 9.45 by 15.60 metres, and 6.80 metres high. During warmer seasons, doors opened up to a balcony above the vestibule and to balconies on either side of the corridors for the first gallery. Spectators in the second gallery had two bars available for beer, which also allowed access to an outside area.

=== House: spectator areas ===
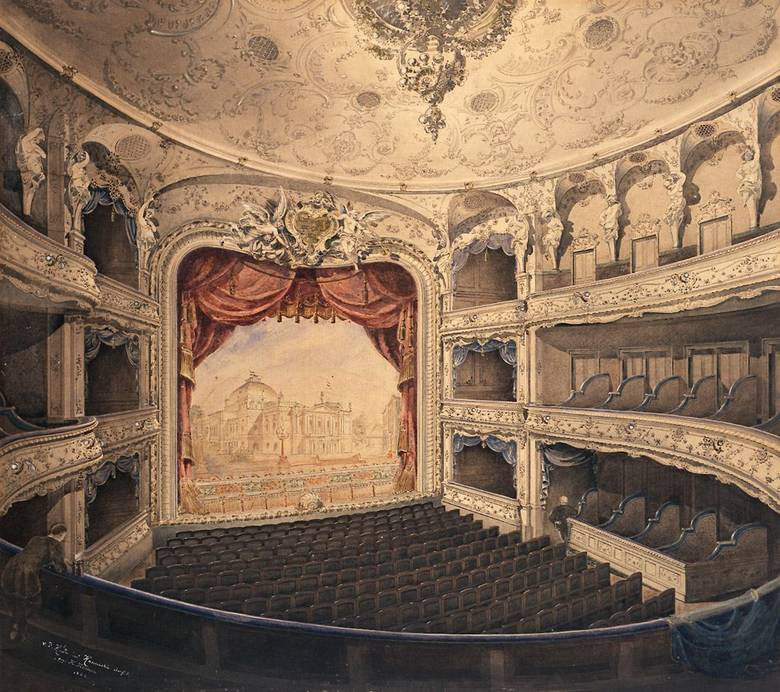
House

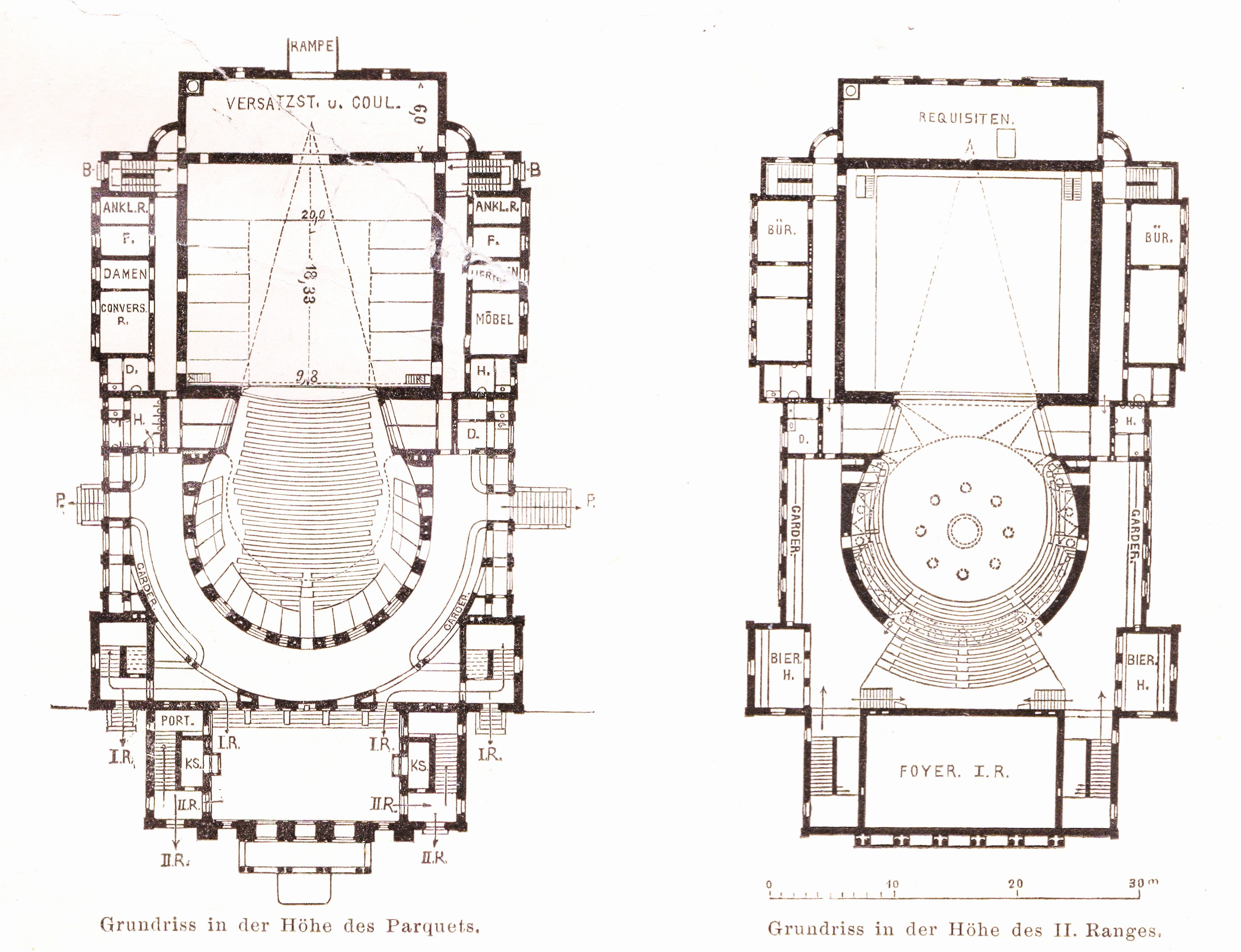
Floorplans for stalls and second gallery

The theater's first artistic director, Ernst von Possart, desired the basic dimensions of the spectator area be copied from Karl Friedrich Schinkel's Schauspielhaus because of its good acoustics. The hall had the shape of a lengthened semi circle with a radius of 18.46 metres, with a 5-metre deep proscenium, tapered from 13.90 to 11.50 metres. The hallways of the stalls were 1,00 metres above street level, those of the first gallery 4.70 metres, and those of the second gallery 8.40 metres. There were 1170 seats. With the exception of the left side of the first gallery, which contained the royal box, each gallery on both sides of the proscenium had two closed boxes each.

In the stalls, there were 18 boxes with 116 seats along the outer wall. 17 rows provided seating for 350 spectators; four rows with 58 second-class seats, below the first gallery balcony, were accessible via a central corridor. The seats measured 0.80 by 0.54 metres, at the time of the opening larger even than that of the Staatsoper Unter den Linden.

The first gallery largely consisted of boxes with a total of 140 seats. The five outside boxes on either side reached to the parapet; the ten boxes on the inside had three rows of seats in front of them ("balcony seats"), offering room for 72 spectators. The second gallery, besides the 28 seats in the proscenium boxes, offered seating in rows for 316 spectators and standing-room for 70 more.

The rococo-style auditorium was mainly white and gold. Rear walls were coloured bronze. All curtains and upholstery were blue silk.

=== Stage house and adjacent areas ===
The stage and adjacent areas were accessible via a ramp in the back, and through doors in the two staircases in the additions on either side. These side additions also had dressing rooms, on the ground floor. Dressing rooms for the choir and the extras were in the basement. Management was on the third floor, and costumes and props were stored on the floor above. The space behind the stage, two storeys high, served as storage for the sets; the third-story level housed furniture, and the fourth-storey level was the scene shop.

The stage measured 20 by 18.33 metres (65.6 by 60.1 ft), enough for six set changes. Tiefe ausreichend for six Kulissen. The Fly system was 18.00 meters above the stage. A two-part iron fire door closed the stage from the sides.

=== Construction and facade ===
The building was constructed mainly from brick and iron, in hopes of minimising the risk of fire; only the stage was made of wood. The construction of a number of stairs in stone and the covering of the roofs and the cupola of the stage with sheet iron completed the precautions against fire. The flat roof over the rooms next to the stalls was done in cement. Lighting was electric.

The theatre was covered in plaster; only the ornaments of the outer facade were sandstone. For the facade, architects von der Hude and Hennick were inspired by Renaissance Revival architecture. For the inside, they opted for Mannerism, and the arena was inspired by Neorococo; in all, the plurality of styles made the theatre a typical representative of Historicism.

== Directors ==
- Oscar Blumenthal (1888–1897)
- Otto Neumann-Hofer (1897–1904)
- Otto Brahm (1905–1912)
- Victor Barnowsky (1913–1924)
- Alfred Rotter, Fritz Rotter (1924–1925)
- Arthur Hellmer (1925–1926)
- Heinz Saltenburg (1926–1929)
- Collective management through the Group of young actors (1929–1930)
- Heinz Saltenburg (1930–1931)
- Robert Klein (1931–1932)
- Alfred Rotter, Fritz Rotter (1932–1933)
- Richard Handwerk (1934–1939)
- Hansheinrich Dransmann (1939–1943)
- Paul Rose (from 1943 merging with the Rose Theatre)

=== Notable actors ===
- Oskar Höcker
- Rudolf Klein-Rogge

== Premieres ==
The following pieces were among the ones first performed in the Lessing Theater:

- Gerhart Hauptmann: Vor Sonnenaufgang (20 October 1889)
- Henrik Ibsen: The Master Builder (19 January 1893)
- August Strindberg: Spiele mit dem Feuer (December 1893)
- Arno Holz und Oskar Jerschke: Traumulus (24 September 1904)
- Arthur Schnitzler: Anatol (3 December 1910, simultaneous with premiere in Wiener Volkstheater)
- Gerhart Hauptmann: Die Ratten (13 January 1911)
- Franz Werfel: Die Troerinnen des Euripides (22 April 1916)
- Carl Zuckmayer: Schinderhannes (13 Oktober 1927)
- Carl Zuckmayer: Katharina Knie (21 December 1928)
- Friedrich Wolf: Cyankali (6 September 1929)

== Post–war ==
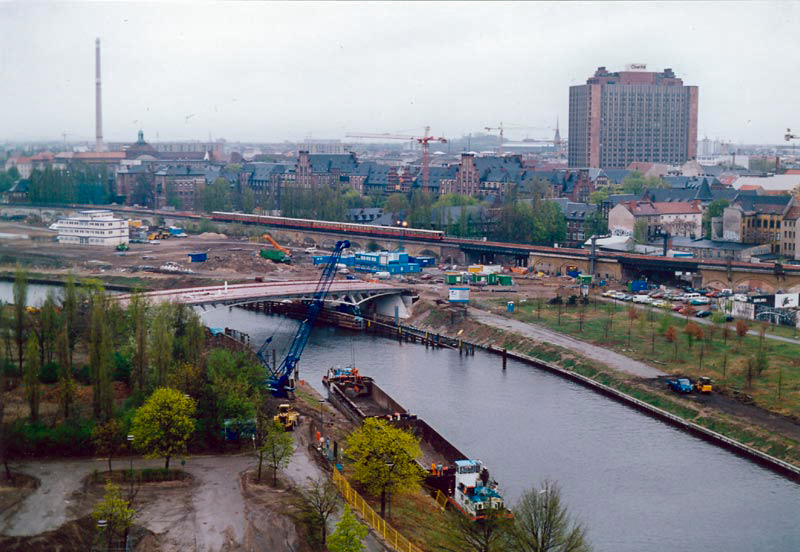
Riverside with Kronprinzenbrücke, 1995

Upon the Allied occupation of Berlin in 1945, the site in Mitte was located directly at the border of the Soviet sector with the British occupied borough of Tiergarten, from 1949 the demarcation line between East and West Berlin. In 1961 the premises between the Spree River and the Stadtbahn became part of the "death strip" on the Berlin Wall, with no obstacles remaining that would inhibit a sure shot on fugitives. On 18 February 1968 a couple trying to overcome the barriers nearby was killed by members of the East German Border Troops.

After the Wall came down in the course of the 1989 Peaceful Revolution, the riverside was rebuilt as part of the new governmental district around the Reichstag parliament building, including the rebuilt Kronprinzenbrücke designed by Santiago Calatrava. From 2005 onwards, the cleared premises of the former theatre were used as Bundespressestrand restaurant, named after a neighbouring news conference building. After a temporarily appearance of the Occupy Berlin movement, the area since 2011 is the construction site of the new Berlin headquarters of the Federal Ministry of Education and Research.

== Bibliography ==
- Joachim Wilcke: Das Lessingtheater in Berlin unter Oscar Blumenthal (1888-1898). Eine Untersuchung mit besonderer Berücksichtigung der zeitgenössischen Theaterkritik. Dissertation, FU Berlin, 1958 (Ernst-Reuter-Gesellschaft, Berlin).
- Werner Buth: Das Lessingtheater in Berlin unter der Direktion von Otto Brahm (1904-1912). Eine Untersuchung mit besonderer Berücksichtigung der zeitgenössischen Theaterkritik. Dissertation, FU Berlin, 1965 (Druckerei Schoen, München).
- Harald Zielske: Deutsche Theaterbauten bis zum zweiten Weltkrieg. Typologisch-historische Dokumentation einer Baugattung. (= Schriften der Gesellschaft für Theatergeschichte; Band 65). Publication of the Gesellschaft für Theatergeschichte, Berlin 1971, pp. 175–178.
