= Karl Heinz Bohrer =

German literary scholar and essayist (1932–2021)

- Born: 26 September 1932; Cologne, Rhineland, Prussia, Germany
- Died: 4 August 2021 (aged 88); London, UK
- Education: University of Heidelberg; Bielefeld University
- Occupations: Journalist; Publisher; Essayist; Literary scholar
- Organizations: Frankfurter Allgemeine Zeitung; Bielefeld University; Merkur; Stanford University
- Awards: Johann Heinrich Merck Prize; Heinrich Mann Prize

Karl Heinz Bohrer (26 September 1932 – 4 August 2021) was a German literary scholar and essayist. He worked as a chief editor for literature of the daily FAZ, and became co-publisher and author of the cultural magazine Merkur. He taught at the Bielefeld University for decades, and also at Stanford University, California. His autobiography appeared in two volumes in 2012 and 2017. Bohrer is regarded as a disputative intellectual thinker and critic, reflecting his time. He received notable awards for criticism, German language and literature, including the Johann Heinrich Merck Prize and the Heinrich Mann Prize. For his extensive work, Bohrer was awarded the Federal Cross of Merit with Ribbon (2014).

== Life and work ==
Bohrer was born in Cologne in 1932, Rhineland, Prussia, Germany. He received a doctorate from the University of Heidelberg in 1962 with a dissertation about the philosophy of history of the German Romantics. He wrote his habilitation at the Bielefeld University, Die Ästhetik des Schreckens – Die pessimistische Romantik und Ernst Jüngers Frühwerk (The Aesthetics of Terror – The Pessimistic Romantics and Ernst Jünger's Early Work). He wrote cultural reports and literary essays for broadcasters, and joined the culture section of the daily Die Welt in Hamburg in 1962.

Bohrer moved on to the Frankfurter Allgemeine Zeitung (FAZ) in Frankfurt in 1966, where he became chief editor for literature from 1968. After he was succeeded in the post by Marcel Reich-Ranicki in 1974, the paper sent him as correspondent to London.

Bohrer was appointed to the chair for Modern German Literary History at Bielefeld University in 1982, and held the position until emerited in 1997. He was called to teach at Stanford University, California, in 2003.

Bohrer succeeded Hans Schwab-Felisch in 1984 as editor of the culture magazine Merkur, along with Kurt Scheel from 1991. He was a thought-provoking writer in the journal (subtitle Deutsche Zeitschrift für europäisches Denken: German journal for European thought), writing for example a satirical "Die Ästhetik des Staates" in 1984, beginning a series about the "Bonn Republic" under Chancellor Helmut Kohl. He received the award Deutscher Sprachpreis (German language prize) in 2002 mainly for his then 18 years as publisher of the journal, the reasoning being that he had made it a respected forum for all questions of intellectual and social life, by his sense of good language, the basis of its success. His sceptical-provocative opinions on the post-war state of mind, reflecting a European perspective, were noted.

Bohrer died in London at age 88.

== Publications ==
Most of Bohrer's publications were (collections of) essays. He also published an autobiography in two volumes, the first in 2012, Granatsplitter (Shrapnel), covering his youth, including World War II and post-war life in ruins, and the second in 2017, Jetzt. Geschichte meines Abenteuers mit der Phantasie. (Now: Story of my adventure with fantasy), about his life from the early 1960s to the time of writing.

- The Lost Paradigm: Frederick II, Prussia, and July 20th. Telos 135 (Summer 2006). New York: Telos Press

== Awards ==
- 1978 Johann Heinrich Merck Prize
- 2000 Lessing-Preis für Kritik
- 2002 Gadamer Foundation Professor of the University of Heidelberg
- 2002 Deutscher Sprachpreis
- 2005 Großer Literaturpreis der Bayerischen Akademie der Schönen Künste
- 2007 Heinrich Mann Prize
