= Günther Rühle =

German journalist, writer, and theatre manager (1924–2021)

- Günther Rühle, in c. 2020
- Born: 3 June 1924; Giessen, Hesse, Germany
- Died: 10 December 2021 (aged 97); Bad Soden am Taunus, Hesse, Germany
- Education: University of Frankfurt
- Occupations: Journalist; Theatre critic; Theatre manager; Writer
- Organizations: FAZ; Schauspiel Frankfurt; Der Tagesspiegel
- Awards: Theodor-Wolff-Preis; Johann-Heinrich-Merck-Preis

Günther Rühle (3 June 1924 – 10 December 2021) was a German theatre critic, book author and theatre manager. He directed the feuilleton (editorial/entertainment) sections of major newspapers and was regarded as an influential theatre critic, beginning in the 1960s. He managed the Schauspiel Frankfurt from 1985 to 1990. Rühle was a member of the PEN-Zentrum Deutschland. From 1993 to 1999, he was president of the Deutsche Akademie der Darstellenden Künste (German Academy of the Performing Arts) in Frankfurt. He published books about the history of theatre in Germany, and its criticism.

== Early life and education ==
Rühle was born in Giessen, Hesse, the son of an auditor. A famous ancestor was the Prussian general August Otto Rühle von Lilienstern, a friend of Heinrich von Kleist. Günther Rühle grew up first in Weilburg, Hesse, and from 1935 in Bremen, where he attended the Altes Gymnasium until 1942. In July 1942, he was drafted into the Arbeitsdienst (Reich Labour Service), and in October that year to the anti-aircraft branch of the Luftwaffe. In 1946, he completed schooling, passing his Abitur. Rühle then studied German studies, history and Volkskunde at the Johann Wolfgang Goethe-Universität Frankfurt am Main until 1952, when he received a doctorate with a dissertation about Andreas Gryphius.

== Career ==
=== Journalism ===
He began work as a journalist for Frankfurter Rundschau in 1953, moving to the feuilleton of the Frankfurter Neue Presse a year later, and to the Frankfurter Allgemeine Zeitung (FAZ) in 1960, where he became an influential theatre critic. He was promoted to head of the department in 1974. From 1990, he held the same position for Der Tagesspiegel in Berlin.

=== Intendant ===
In 1984, Hilmar Hoffmann, responsible for culture in Frankfurt, chose Rühle to succeed Adolf Dresen as Intendant (theatre manager) of the Schauspiel Frankfurt. Rühle held the position until 1990, and was responsible for engaging Michael Gruner and Dietrich Hilsdorf as regular directors, and actors such as Martin Wuttke and Thomas Thieme. In 1985, Hilsdorf directed the controversial Fassbinder play Der Müll, die Stadt und der Tod ("Garbage, City, Death") in the Kammerspiele of the Schauspiel Frankfurt. Due to alleged antisemitic tendencies in the play, protesters occupied the stage and prevented its world premiere. Rühle staged a performance for around 150 critics and theatre personnel on 4 November, which the publisher counted as the world premiere. The Frankfurter Rundschau newspaper reported that the Frankfurt theatre had proven that the play was not marred by antisemitism. However, due to continued protests, the play was not performed for the public for safety reasons.

Rühle promoted the director and poet Einar Schleef, who, coming from East Germany, was at first not accepted by the paper's audience and critics, but whose 1988 production of Gerhard Hauptmann's Vor Sonnenaufgang ("Before Sunrise") was invited to the Berliner Theatertreffen. Hoffmann offered an extension of Rühle's contract in 1989, but he declined.

=== Author and editor ===
Rühle wrote a book in two volumes about the history of theatre criticism in Germany, Theater für die Republik. Im Spiegel der Kritik, which appeared in 1988. From 1995, he worked as a freelance editor. He was the principal editor of an edition of Alfred Kerr's complete works, by S. Fischer Verlag. He was also president of the Alfred Kerr Foundation in Berlin, and editor of the complete works by Marieluise Fleißer by Suhrkamp. In 2007, he published the first volume of a history of theatre in Germany, Theater in Deutschland 1887 bis 1945. Seine Ereignisse – seine Menschen (Theatre in Germany 1887 to 1945. Its events – its people) in S. Fischer, followed in 2014 by a second volume about the years 1945–1966. The work was praised for rich details, and has become a standard in the field. A third volume is planned, to be authored, at Rühle's request, by Hermann Beil and Stephan Dörschel.

He died in Bad Soden am Taunus, Hesse, on 10 December 2021, at the age of 97.

== Awards and honours ==
- 1963 Theodor-Wolff-Preis
- 2007 Johann-Heinrich-Merck-Preis
- 2009 Hermann-Sinsheimer-Preis
- 2010 Binding-Kulturpreis
- 2013 Rahel-Varnhagen-von-Ense-Medaille

Rühle was an honorary citizen of Bensheim. In 2009, an award of the Woche junger Schauspielerinnen und Schauspieler for the best theatre acting by a newcomer was named the Günther-Rühle-Preis.

== Publications ==
- Theater in unserer Zeit, 3 volumes, Suhrkamp, Frankfurt 1976/1982/1992
- (ed.): Bücher, die das Jahrhundert bewegten. Zeitanalysen, wiedergelesen. Piper, Munich 1978, ISBN 3-492-02399-1; S. Fischer Verlag pocket book 5008, Frankfurt 1980, ISBN 3-596-25008-0.
- Theater für die Republik. Im Spiegel der Kritik. vol. 1: 1917–1925, revised, S. Fischer Verlag, Frankfurt 1988, ISBN 3-10-068503-2.
- Theater für die Republik. Im Spiegel der Kritik. vol. 2: 1926–1933, revised, S. Fischer Verlag, Frankfurt 1988, ISBN 3-10-068504-0.
- Theater in Deutschland 1887–1945. Seine Ereignisse – seine Menschen. S. Fischer Verlag, Frankfurt 2007, ISBN 978-3-10-068508-7.
- Theater in Deutschland 1945–1966. Seine Ereignisse – seine Menschen. S. Fischer Verlag, Frankfurt 2014, ISBN 978-3-10-001461-0.
- Ein alter Mann wird älter. Ein merkwürdiges Tagebuch. ed. by Gerhard Ahrens, Alexander Verlag, Berlin 2021, ISBN 978-3-89581-576-8.
