= Hermann von der Hude =

German architect (1830–1908)

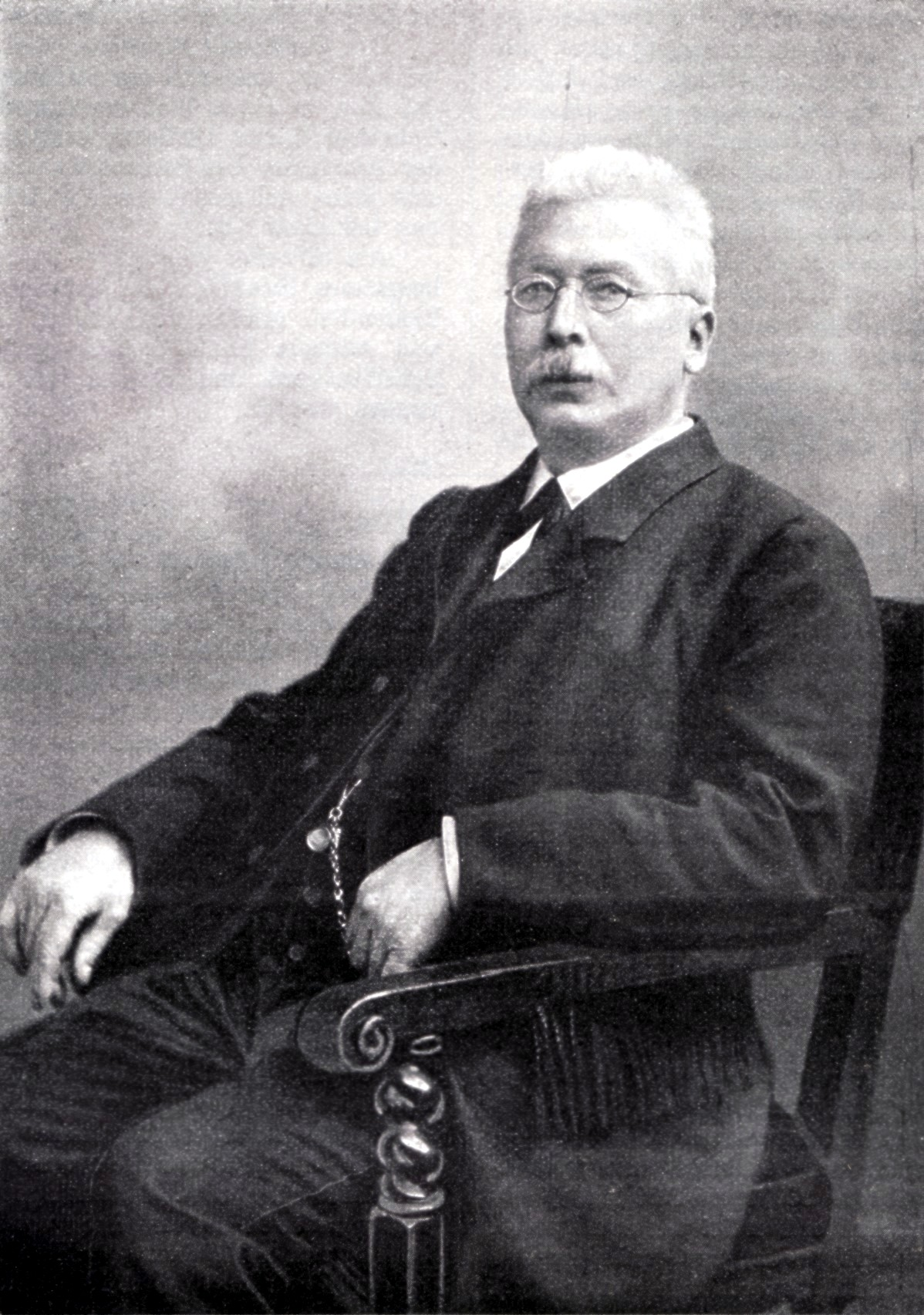
Hermann von der Hude (date unknown)

Hermann Philipp Wilhelm von der Hude (2 June 1830, Lübeck – 4 June 1908, Charlottenburg) was a German architect, in the Historical style.

== Life and work ==
He came from a family of pewter makers; established in Lübeck since the 17th century. After completing his secondary education at the Katharineum in 1849, he was apprenticed to Ferdinand von Arnim in Potsdam. In 1850, he enrolled at the Bauakademie. While attending, he worked with Friedrich August Stüler on his plans for the Berliner Dom. When he studies were complete, he received temporary assignments, working on public structures, such as the Dirschauer Bridge, as well as managing the construction of residential buildings.

In 1855, he took a study trip to Italy. When he returned, he passed the Master Builder examination (1857) and, that same year, won the Schinkelpreis, awarded by the Architektenverein zu Berlin, with a design for the new Berlin City Hall. This was followed by further trips, to England and France, and his appointment as "Royal Government Builder'. From 1860, he ran his own architectural office, in partnership with Julius Hennicke. By 1862, he had already resigned from the Civil Service, to devote all of his time to his private practice.

He and Hennicke designed residential and commercial buildings, as well as hotels, notably the Kaiserhof (1874) and the Central-Hotel, on Friedrichstraße. Their Lessing Theater (1887), was the first new theatre built in Berlin since the 1860s. All three buildings were destroyed in World War II. The company was dissolved in 1892, and Hennicke died not long after.

On New Year's Eve of 1907, he suffered a stroke, from which he never recovered. He was interred at Cemetery IV of the Jerusalem and New Church Congregation, in Berlin's Kreuzberg district.

== Work ==
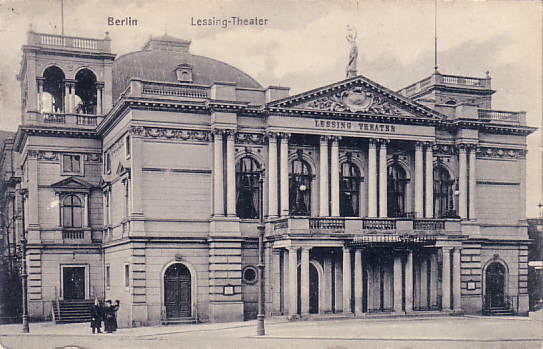
The Lessing Theatre (1910s)

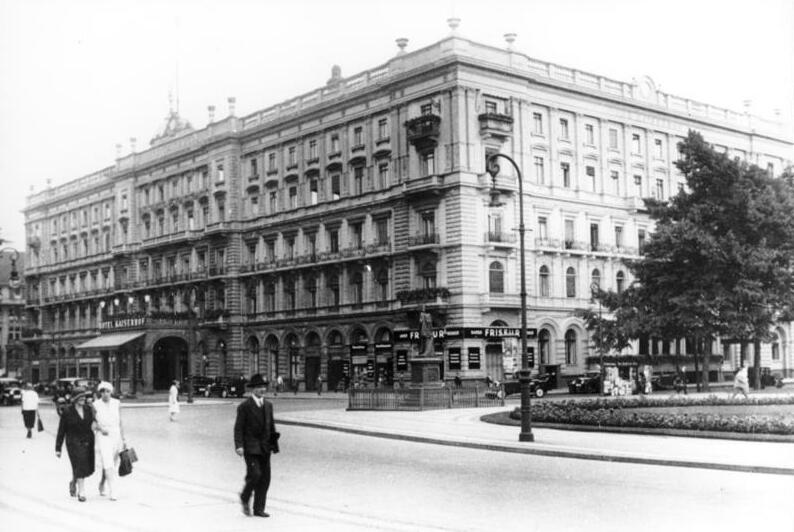
The Kaiserhof Hotel (1931)

Von der Hude's work includes:

- Kunsthalle Hamburg, with Georg Theodor Schirrmacher, Hamburg, 1863–69
- reconstruction, Palais am Festungsgraben, with Georg Heinrich Bürde, Berlin, 1863–64
- Hotel Kaiserhof, with Julius Hennicke, Berlin, 1875 (destroyed 1945)
- Hotel Central, with Hennicke, Berlin, 1880–81 (destroyed 1945)
- reconstruction of the prayer hall at Neue Kirche, Berlin, with Hennicke, according to plans from Johann Wilhelm Schwedler, 1881–82
- Gera Hauptbahnhof, with Hennicke, 1881 (disfigured circa 1960)
- Davidsonska Palace, with Swedish architect Magnus Isæus, Stockholm, 1881 (destroyed 1942)
- Lessing Theater, Berlin, with Hennicke, 1887–88 (destroyed 1945)
