= Alen Pol Kobryn =

American poet, novelist, actor

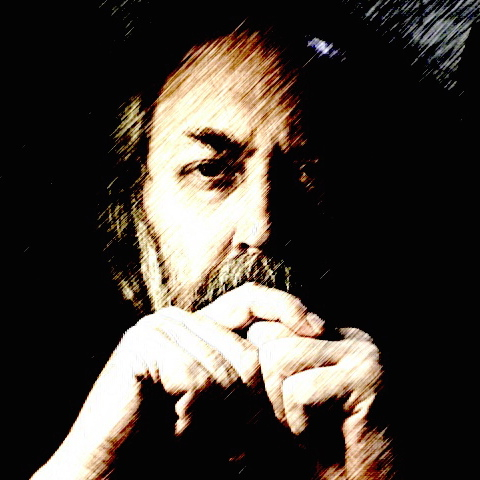
- Born: September 29, 1949; Utica, New York, U.S.
- Died: May 27, 2023 (aged 73)
- Occupations: Poet; novelist; voice actor

Alen Pol Kobryn (September 29, 1949 – May 27, 2023) was an American poet, novelist, and voice actor.

Kobryn was educated at Johns Hopkins and New York University, and studied with John Ashbery at the City University of New York.

His work has been published by Scribner, Dell, and New English Library, and has been broadcast on WBAI, where Kobryn hosted Big Al's Literary Salon & Pool Hall while also working with Charles Ruas in the Drama and Literature Department.

... and other prisons, Kobryn's novel, was first represented by Kurt Hellmer.

Framework, verse, and Attica State, a work in verse, were first broadcast on WBAI.

Poseidon's Shadow, a novel projecting the theme of the Iliad in Cold War terms, published by Scribner, contains one of the earliest references to the existence of stealth technology.

Kobryn also performed voice over and character work, having first performed, as well as produced, at WBAI in 1976, since which time he had lent his voice to such varied projects as PBS's Nova and the Asymmetric Warfare Group.

Kobryn, who lived in New York, collaborated with composer Wang Jie, and was thought to be preparing to end his long artistic silence until his death in 2023.
