= Iso Camartin =

Swiss author, publicist and anchorman

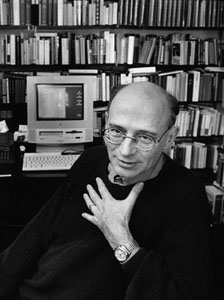
Iso Camartin (1998)

Iso Camartin (born 24 March 1944 in Chur) is a Swiss author, publicist and anchorman.

== Selected works ==
- Kants Schematismuslehre und ihre Transformation beim frühen Fichte. Zur Ausformung des Identitätsdenkens. Dissertation, Regensburg 1971
- Nichts als Worte? Ein Plädoyer für Kleinsprachen. Artemis, Zürich 1985
- Lob der Verführung. Essays über die Nachgiebigkeit. Artemis, Zürich 1987
- Karambolagen. Geschichten und Glossen. Artemis, Zürich 1990
- Von Sils-Maria aus betrachtet. Ausblicke vom Dach Europas. Suhrkamp, Frankfurt am Main 1991
- Die Bibliothek von Pila. Suhrkamp, Frankfurt am Main 1994
- Nelke und Caruso. Über Hunde. Eine Romanze (mit Verena Aufferman). Berlin Verlag, Berlin 1997
- Der Teufel auf der Säule. 52 Flash-Geschichten. Suhrkamp, Frankfurt am Main 1998
- Graziendienst. Suhrkamp, Frankfurt am Main 1999
- Hinauslehnen. Geschichten, Glossen. Suhrkamp, Frankfurt am Main 2000
- Jeder braucht seinen Süden. Suhrkamp, Frankfurt am Main 2003
- Belvedere. Das schöne Fernsehen. Suhrkamp, Frankfurt am Main 2005
- Bin ich Europäer? Eine Tauglichkeitsprüfung. C. H. Beck, München 2006
- Die Geschichten des Herrn Casparis. C. H. Beck, München 2008
- Schweiz (Reihe Die Deutschen und ihre Nachbarn). C. H. Beck, München 2008

== Awards ==
- 1986: Prix européen de l'essai Charles Veillon
- 1988: Conrad-Ferdinand-Meyer-Preis
- 1997: Prix Lipp littéraire
- 1998: Johann-Heinrich-Merck-Preis
