= Hans Keilson =

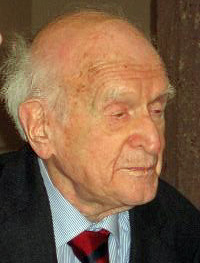
- Hans Keilson in 2007
- Born: Hans Alex Keilson; 12 December 1909; Bad Freienwalde, Germany
- Died: 31 May 2011 (aged 101); Hilversum, Netherlands
- Citizenship: Dutch
- Occupations: Medic, psychiatrist, psychoanalyst, writer
- Spouse(s): Gertrud Manz (m. 1930; died 1969) Marita Lauritz (m. 1970)
- Children: 2
- Writing career
- Language: Dutch, German
- Period: 1933–2011
- Subject: World War II
- Notable awards: Knighthood of the Order of Orange-Nassau

Hans Alex Keilson (Dutch pronunciation: [ɦɑns ˈkɛilsɔn]; 12 December 1909 – 31 May 2011) was a German-Dutch novelist, poet, psychoanalyst and child psychologist. He was best known for his novels set during the Second World War, during which he was an active member of the Dutch resistance.

Keilson, having worked with traumatized orphans, mainly wrote about traumas induced by the war. His first novel was published in 1934, but most of his works were published after the war. In 2010, The New York Times 's Francine Prose described Keilson as "one of the world's greatest writers", notably honouring Keilson's achievements in the year in which he turned 101 years old.

== Biography ==
=== 1928–40: Exile ===
From 1928 to 1934, Keilson studied pharmacology in Berlin, but due to the Nazi law prohibiting Jews from employment, Keilson was employed as a professional gym teacher in Jewish private schools, and occasionally made money as a musician. During this period, Keilson also met his first wife, graphologist Gertrud Manz (1901). In 1936, the couple went into exile and fled to the Netherlands. During his time here, Keilson wrote a few books in Dutch language, crediting himself under the pseudonym Benjamin Cooper.

=== 1941–69: World War II and aftermath ===
In 1941, Keilson went into hiding and had to leave his pregnant wife behind. His wife gave birth to a daughter, Barbara, in the same year; she pretended the girl's father was a German officer to prevent prosecution. Meanwhile, Keilson had moved in with a married couple in Delft, taking on a new identity as physician Dr. Van der Linden. During this time, the Dutch resistance asked him to pay visits to Jewish children that had been separated from their parents after they had gone into hiding. These experiences in particular formed the main inspiration for Keilson's later works. Keilson reunited with his wife and daughter after the war. He and Gertrud were unable to marry before the war. In Germany they couldn't marry because of Keilson's Jewish origins. In the Netherlands it was not possible to marry for the Dutch law as German citizens. And so, when the war was over they married within the Liberal Jewish Community of Amsterdam. After the war Gertrud had to explain to the Dutch neighbours that her husband was indeed German, but also Jewish, to avoid further consequences. Keilson had to requalify for his physician's licence, should he want to work in the Netherlands, and did so. He specialized as a psychiatrist and a psychoanalyst. In 1969, Gertrud died.

During the war, Keilson's parents were deported to Auschwitz, where both died. In later interviews Keilson expressed deep regret for being unable to save his parents.

=== 1970–2009: Second marriage ===
In 1970 Keilson married literature historian Marita Lauritz (1935), 25 years his junior. Marita gave birth to his, and her, second daughter, Bloeme, in 1974. He published several more works and received little media attention. On his special birthday anniversaries, such as his 70th, 80th and 90th birthday, Dutch media would do interviews with him.

=== 2010–11: recognition ===
In 2010, The New York Times's Francine Prose described Keilson as "one of the world's greatest writers". Much media attention, in both the United States and his adopted home country, the Netherlands, was given to the fact that Keilson received this acknowledgement at the age of 100. Keilson was invited to Dutch talkshow De Wereld Draait Door, where he was interviewed by presenter Matthijs van Nieuwkerk. Many more articles and interviews appeared in the following year, worldwide, and by then his Der Tod des Widersachers ("The Death of the Adversary") had been translated in 20 languages.

He died on 31 May 2011 in Hilversum, at the age of 101.

== Awards and honors ==
- Honorary citizenship of the town of Bad Freienwalde
- Silver Medal of the International Federation of Resistance Fighters – Association of Anti-Fascists
- Honorary Doctorate of the University of Bremen
- Officer's Cross of the Order of Merit of the Federal Republic of Germany
- 1999 Hayman Prize for Published Work Pertaining to Traumatised Children and Adults of the International Psychoanalytical Association
- 2005 Johann-Heinrich-Merck-Preis
- 2007 Moses Mendelssohn Medal of the Moses Mendelssohn Center for European Jewish studies (MMZ) Potsdam
- 2008 Welt-Literaturpreis

== Bibliography ==
Works

- Life Goes On [novel; Das Leben geht weiter], 2012
- The Death of the Adversary [novel; translation of Der Tod des Widersachers: Roman]. 2010.
- Comedy in a Minor Key [novel; translation of Komödie in Moll]. 2010.
- Hans Keilson (100) Frankfurt am Main: Fischer. 2009.
- Werke, Bd. 2 / Gedichte und Essays. 2005.
- Werke, Bd. 1 / Romane und Erzaehlungen. 2005.
- Sequentielle Traumatisierung bei Kindern: Untersuchung zum Schicksal jüdischer Kriegswaisen. Psychosozial-Verlag. 2005. (English translation: Sequential Traumatisation in Children. A clinical and statistical follow-up study on the fate of the Jewish war orphans in the Netherlands. The Magnes Press, The Hebrew University, Jerusalem. 1992. ISBN 965-223-806-6)
- Probleme in der sexuellen Erziehung Essen: Neue Deutsche Schule Verlagsgesellschaft. 1966.

Further reading

- Anon. "Fresh Ink," "Books," San Francisco Chronicle and SFGate, 8 August 2010: F8.
- Balint, Benjamin. "Keilson's Kaddish, Now in English". Haaretz, January 21, 2013.
- Kirsch, Adam. "Bearing Witness: A reissued novel and a newly translated novella offer a reintroduction to the 100-year-old Hans Keilson" Tablet, August 3, 2010.
- Das Münchener Abkommen und die Intellektuellen: Literatur und Exil in Frankreich zwischen Krise und Krieg edited by Martine Boyer-Weinmann et al. Tuebingen: Narr. 2008.[Keilson discusses his exile.]
- "Gedenk und vergiß – im Abschaum der Geschichte ..." : Trauma und Erinnern; Hans Keilson zu Ehren; Marianne Leuzinger-Bohleber. – Tübingen : edition diskord. 2001.
- Juelich, Dierk (ed.). Geschichte als Trauma. Festschrift für Hans Keilson zu seinem 80. Geburtstag. Gießen: Psychosozial-Verlag. 1989.
- Roland Kaufhold: Neue Werke von Hans Keilson „Kein Plädoyer für eine Luftschaukel“ in haGalil
- Roland Kaufhold: "Das Leben geht weiter". Hans Keilson, ein jüdischer Psychoanalytiker, Schriftsteller, Pädagoge und Musiker
- Roland Kaufhold (2008): Das Leben geht weiter. Hans Keilson, ein jüdischer Psychoanalytiker, Schriftsteller, Pädagoge und Musiker, in: Zeitschrift für psychoanalytische Theorie und Praxis (ZPTP), Heft 1/2-2008, pp. 142–167. online
- Hans-Jürgen Balmes (Hg.) e.a.: Hans Keilson 100 in: Neue Rundschau 2009/4; pp. Fischer, Frankfurt 2009
- Roland Kaufhold (2009): Hans Keilson wird 100. Schriftsteller, Traumatherapeut, Psychoanalytiker, in: Tribüne H. 192, 4/2009, pp. 10–13
- Roland Kaufhold (2010): Keine Spuren mehr im Rauchfang der Lüfte – sprachloser Himmel. Hans Keilson wird 100, in: Kinderanalyse, 1/2010 17. Jg., pp. 94–109.
- Heinrich Detering: Ein verborgener Erzähler : Der Schriftsteller und Psychoanalytiker Hans Keilson feiert heute seinen Hundertsten, in: FAZ, 12. Dezember 2009, Seite 36
- Roland Kaufhold (2009): Weiterleben – biografische Kontinuität im Exil. Hans Keilson wird 100, in: psychosozial Nr. 118 (4/2009). pp. 119–131.
- Schröder, Simone/Ulrike Weymann/Andreas Martin Widmann (eds.): "die vergangene Zeit bleibt die erlittene Zeit": Untersuchungen zum Werk von Hans Keilson. Würzburg: Königshausen & Neumann 2013.
