= Peter Demetz =

American literary scholar (1922–2024)

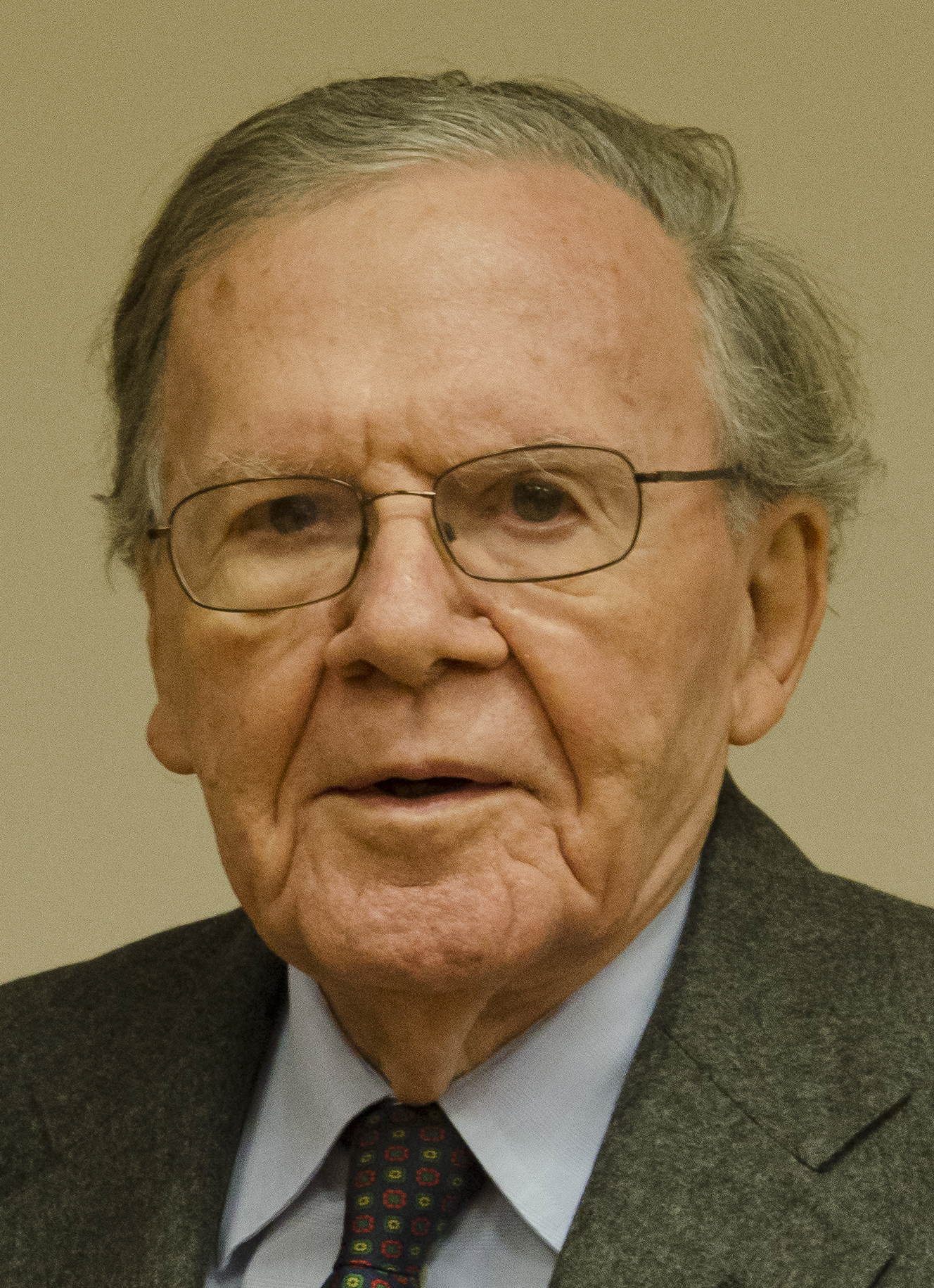
- Demetz in 2012
- Born: Petr Demetz; October 21, 1922; Prague, Czechoslovakia
- Died: April 30, 2024 (aged 101)
- Occupations: Scholar; Author
- Organizations: Yale University

Peter Demetz (born Petr Demetz; October 21, 1922 – April 30, 2024) was an American scholar of German literature. He was born in Prague, where he was persecuted under the Nazis and escaped the Communist regime in 1949. He worked in Germany as a teacher and radio journalist. He emigrated to the United States in 1952, studied further, and began teaching at Yale University in 1956; he was later appointed a Sterling Professor there and Distinguished Visiting professor at Rutgers University. From the 1970s, he also worked as a literary critic for German papers such as the Frankfurter Allgemeine Zeitung. He is known for his 1997 book, Prague in Black and Gold: Scenes from the Life of a European City.

== Life and career ==
Petr Demetz was born in Prague, Czechoslovakia, on October 21, 1922. His mother was a Jewish seamstress, and his father a Catholic German. They had married after World War I; his mother divorced his father. He grew up in Brno, where he experienced a working democracy. Under the Nazi occupation, Demetz joined a resistance group. He was arrested by the Gestapo and forced to do hard labor. His mother died in Terezín concentration camp.

Demetz studied philosophy, comparative religious sciences, German studies and English at the Charles University in Prague, with Hugo Siebenschein, Jan Patočka and Ladislav Rieger; he achieved a doctorate in German studies in 1948. His dissertation dealt with the influence of Franz Kafka on literature in English from 1947.

Demetz and Hanna, his future wife, fled the rise of Communism in Prague and emigrated to Germany in 1949. They first reached Munich, where Demetz soon found work because of his fluent English. He was a teacher in a camp for children in Bad Aibling run by the International Refugee Organization, where his students were orphans who had been persecuted for racial and political reasons. In the late 1950s, he became one of the first journalists of the American broadcaster Radio Free Europe, running a daily literature feature in Czech, which contained poetry and music.

The Demetz family moved to the United States in 1952, where Peter earned a master's degree in German studies at Columbia University and another doctorate in comparative literary history, at Yale University, with a dissertation about the Prague years of Franz Kafka and Rainer Maria Rilke. He was on the faculty of Yale from 1956 until 1991 when he retired, from 1962 as professor of German literature and comparative literary history, serving as head of the department from 1963 to 1969, and from 1972 as Sterling Professor. He lectured as a guest at universities including Columbia, Cornell, Princeton and the University of St. Gallen. He was vice-chair and later chairman of the Modern Language Association (MLA), and he served on the jury of the Ingeborg Bachmann Prize for ten years. including the Austrian Institute for Eastern and Southeastern Europe at the Faculty of Arts of Masaryk University in Brno, and the Austrian Library in Lectures cycle in collaboration with the Moravian Library.

From 1974, Demetz wrote as a literary critic for the Frankfurter Allgemeine Zeitung, invited by Marcel Reich-Ranicki, and also for Die Zeit. In 1991, Demetz wrote a story, Nathan the Wise, in which a Jewish Merchant, Nathan, an Islamic Sultan, and a Christian Templar find a shared perspective about tolerance. Much of Demetz' work can be attributed to his life and the lives of his family members. Demetz wrote stories to remind readers that tolerance can vanish but it doesn't have to, much like the characters in Nathan the Wise. In 1997, he published a key work, Prague in Black and Gold: Scenes from the Life of a European City, both a history and personal memoir, reflecting the city that inspired Johannes Kepler, Rabbi Judah Loew, composers Mozart, Antonín Dvořák and Bedřich Smetana, and authors Rilke and Kafka. His books were published in German, Czech, and English. He wrote autobiographic books, including a collection of essays, Böhmische Sonne, mährischer Mond in 1996, and Mein Prag in 2007, narrating his experiences under the Nazi occupation. Demetz was the Craig Distinguished Visiting professor at Rutgers University from 2007 to 2008. Demetz turned 100 in October 2022 and died on April 30, 2024, at age 101.

== Publications ==
- René Rilkes Prager Jahre, Düsseldorf
- Marx, Engels, and the Poets: Origins of Marxist Literary Criticism. Translated by Sammons, Jeffrey L. (Revised ed.). Chicago & London: University of Chicago Press. 1967.
- Formen des Realismus – Theodor Fontane, Munich, 1964
- Böhmische Sonne, mährischer Mond. Essays und Erinnerungen. Deuticke, Vienna, 1996, ISBN 3-216-30203-2.
- Prague in black and gold : scenes from the life of a European city. Macmillan. 1997. ISBN 9780809016099. ("a history of my hometown from the sixth to the early twentieth century", writes the author in Prague in Danger, p. vii)
- Air show at Brescia, 1909. Farrar, Straus and Giroux. 2002. ISBN 9781429998840.
- Böhmen böhmisch: Essays. Mit einem Vorw. von Karl Schwarzenberg. Vienna: Zsolnay, 2006. ISBN 978-3-552-05373-1.
- Mein Prag. Erinnerungen 1939 bis 1945. first in English, translated by Barbara Schaden. Zsolnay, Vienna, 2007, ISBN 978-3-552-05407-3.
- Demetz, Peter (2008). Prague in danger : the years of German occupation, 1939–45 : memories and history, terror and resistance, theater and jazz, film and poetry, politics and war. New York: Farrar, Straus and Giroux. ISBN 9781429930352.

== Awards ==
- 1971: Goethe Medal
- 1984: Order of Merit of the Federal Republic of Germany
- 1994: Johann-Heinrich-Merck-Preis of the Deutsche Akademie für Sprache und Dichtung, Darmstadt
- 1996: Humboldt Prize
- 2000: Jonorary doctorate of the University of Ostrava
- 2000: Medal of Merit of the Czech Republic
- 2004: Europäischer Kulturpreis Pro Europa
- 2007: Silver medal from the Charles University
- 2012: Georg Dehio Book Prize
- 2012: Gold medal of Charles University
- 2014: George Theiner Prize, Prague
- 2014: Honorary doctorate of the Masaryk University in Brno
