= Städtische Bühnen Frankfurt =

German municipal theatre company

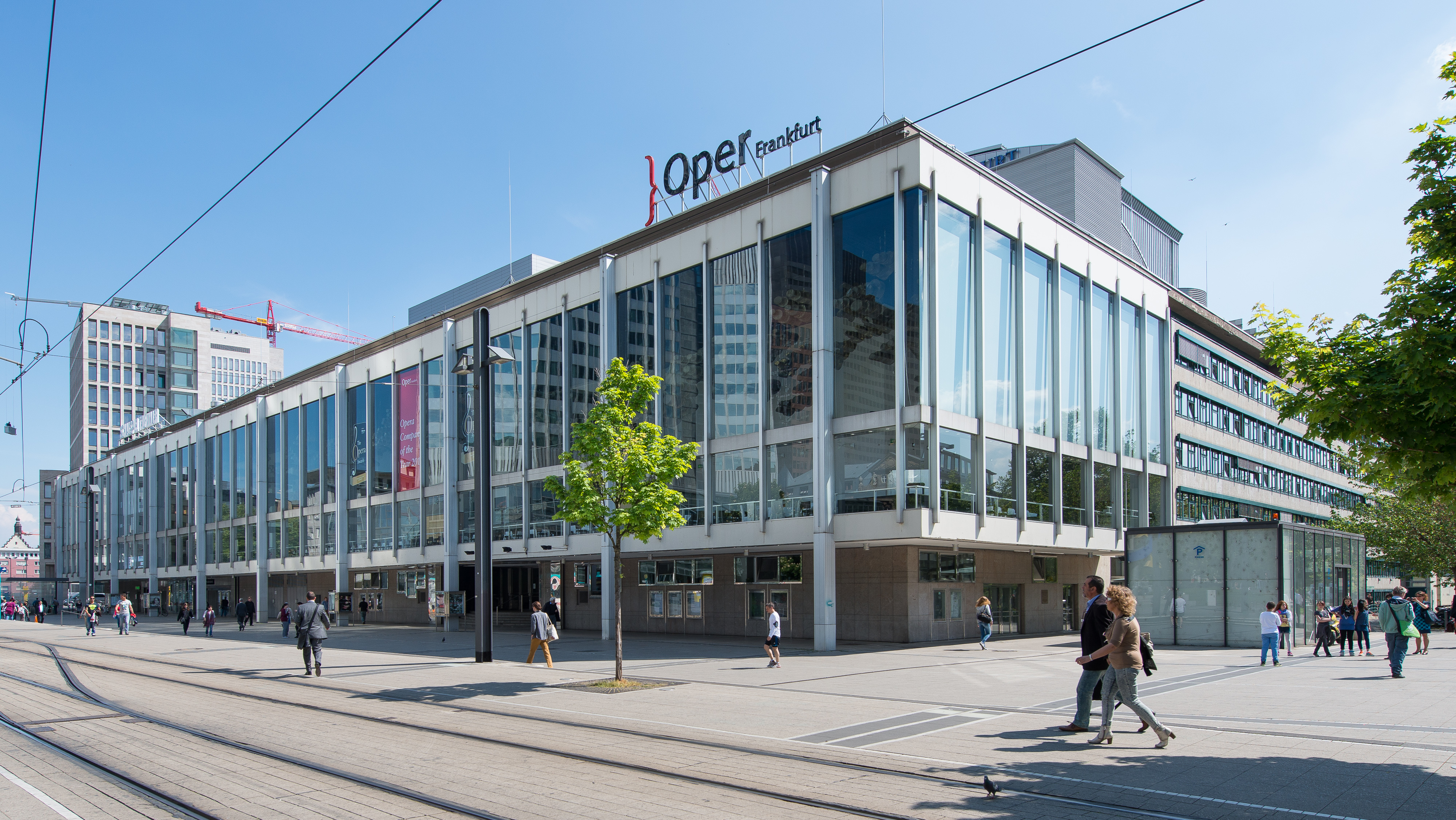
- Opern- und Schauspielhaus Frankfurt in 2014
- Location: Willy-Brandt-Platz in Frankfurt, Hesse, Germany
- Leader: Bernd Loebe; Anselm Weber
- Staff: 1065 (2023/2024)
- Website: www.buehnen-frankfurt.de
- Building details

General information
- Coordinates: 50°06′29″N 8°40′27″E

Design and construction
- Architects: Apel, Beckert und Becker

Other information
- Seating capacity: 1,369 (Opernhaus); 689 (Schauspielhaus)
- Public transit: Willy-Brandt-Platz; 11, 12, 14, 15, 16, 17, 18, 20 Willy-Brandt-Platz; N11, N12, N4, N5, N8 Willy-Brandt-Platz

Städtische Bühnen Frankfurt (lit. 'Municipal stages of Frankfurt') is the municipal theatre company of Frankfurt, the largest city of Hesse Germany. The name dates back to 1919. The company is structured today in two organisations, Oper Frankfurt for opera, and Schauspiel Frankfurt for drama (Schauspiel).

The largest venue for both organisations is their common home, the Opern- und Schauspielhaus at the Willy-Brandt-Platz in the centre of Frankfurt. It was opened in 1963 at the location of the former Schauspielhaus. The Bockenheimer Depot is an external stage for both organisations.

== History ==
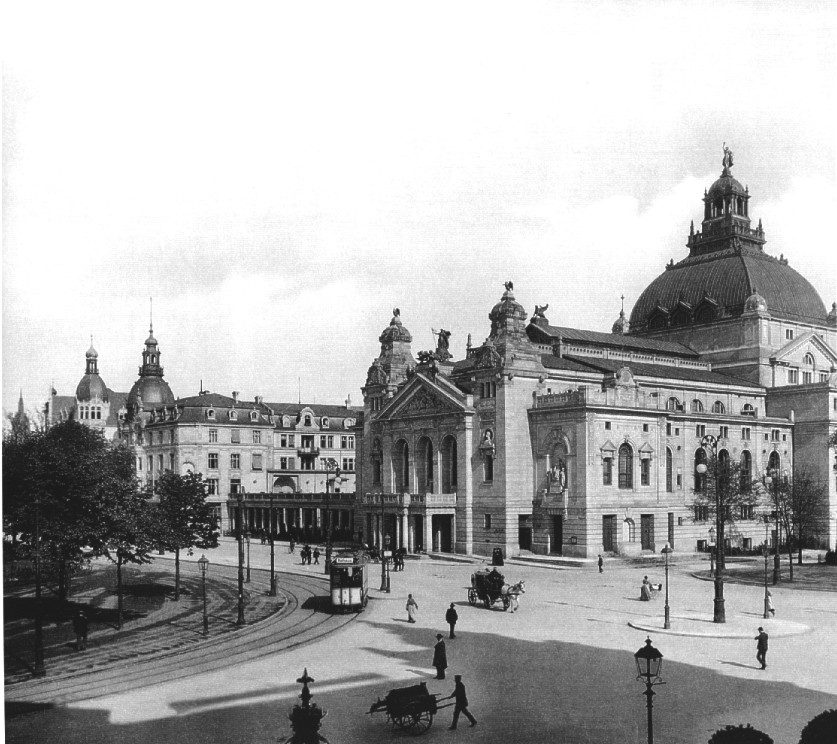
Historic Schauspielhaus

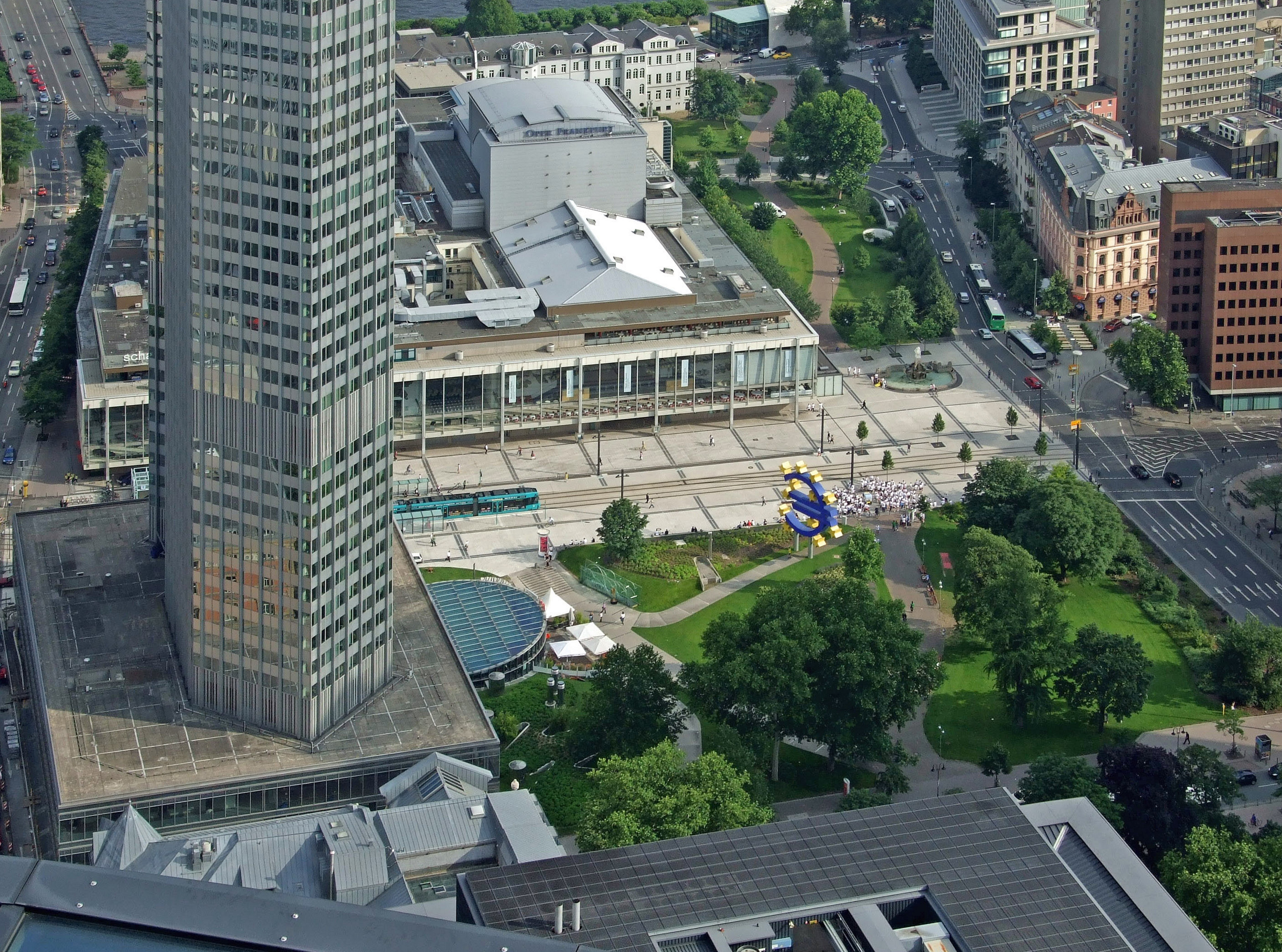
The building from above

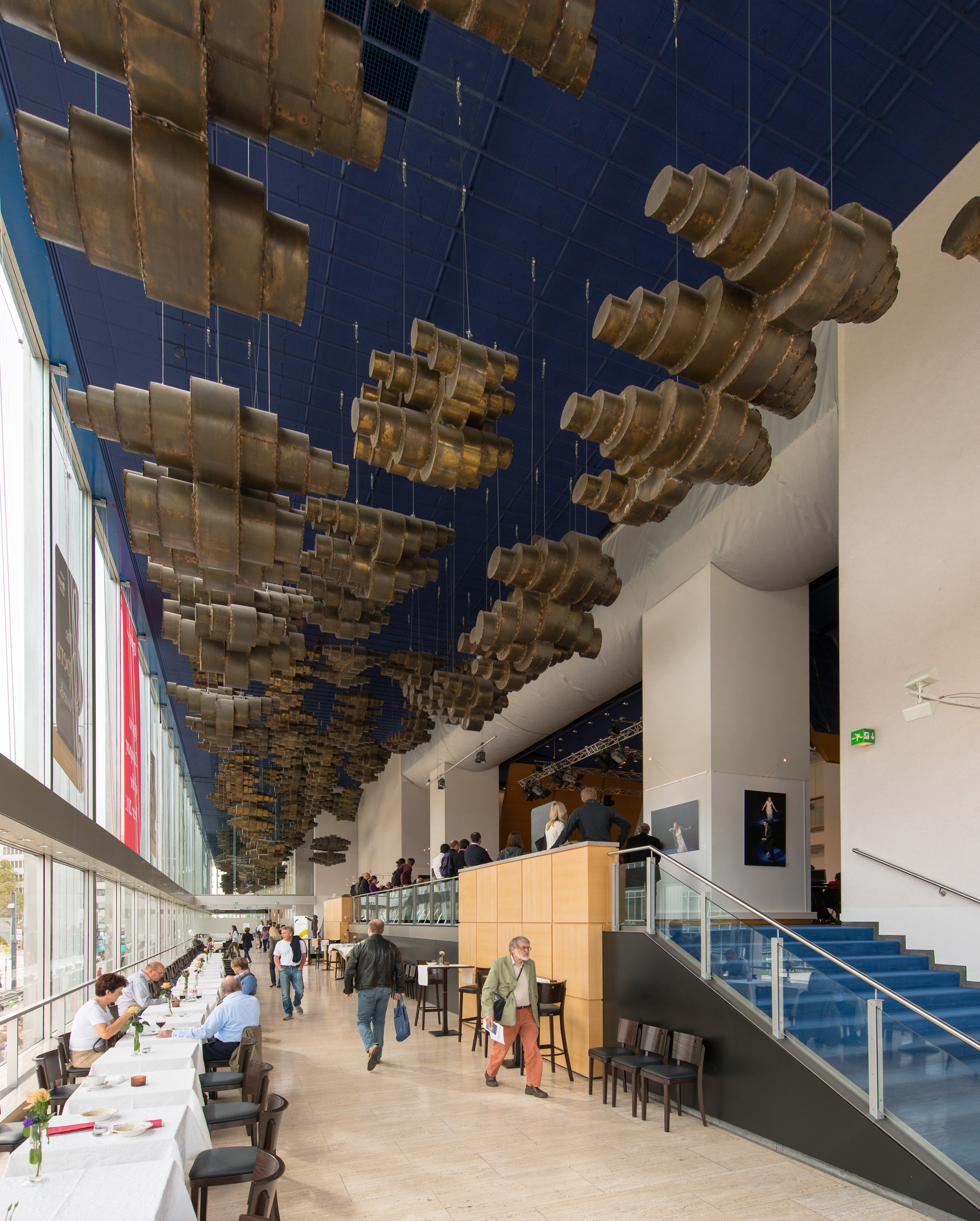
Cloud foyer

Opened in 1782, the Comoedienhaus (comedy house), with a seating capacity of 1,016, was the first permanent venue of theatre in Frankfurt, for both plays and opera. In 1880, an opera house (Opernhaus) was built, with a seating capacity of 2,010. Both sections (Sparten) were organised as the Vereinigte Stadttheater (Common city theatres), headed by general manager (Generalintendant) Emil Claar. In 1902, a Schauspielhaus was opened for plays, designed by Heinrich Seeling in Jugendstil.

From 1919, the name was changed to Städtische Bühnen. Bombing in World War II destroyed the Opernhaus and damaged the Schauspielhaus badly. After the war, performances were held at the hall of the Frankfurt Stock Exchange instead. Based on the ruins of the Schauspielhaus, a new facility was created to provide both plays and operas, and realized in stages completed in 1963. The ruin of the Schauspielhaus was restored from 1950 to 1951, as Großes Haus der Städtischen Bühnen. In 1954, planning began for a larger and more modern house, again as a modification of the existing location. Beginning in 1959, per the designs of architectural firm Apel & Beckert, the facade was completely replaced, with some elements of the old house partly retained inside.

The new house was decorated by a large painting commissioned from Marc Chagall in 1959, Commedia dell'Arte. The ceiling of the foyer which is common for play and opera is decorated with a sculpture by Zoltán Kemény, Goldwolken (golden clouds). The house was opened in December 1963.

On 12 November 1987, fire damaged the large hall. During restoration, opera was played in the small hall, while plays were performed at the Bockenheimer Depot. The large hall was back in service in 1991. The opera contains the largest revolving stage in Europe.

The Theater am Turm was part of the Städtische Bühnen from 1995 until it was closed in 2004. Ballett Frankfurt was closed, also in 2004. Its director from 1984, William Forsythe, continued his program with The Forsythe Company from April 2005 to 2015.

In 2020, the glass facade and the golden clouds in the theater foyer were listed as historical monuments.

As of 2023, new buildings for the Städtische Bühnen are planned. Preferred variant is the Kulturmeile (culture mile), where opera and theatre will have separate buildings.

=== Organisation ===
Städtische Bühnen was an organisation with one general manager (Generalintendant) until 1972. The artistic sections were then split to Oper Frankfurt and Schauspiel Frankfurt, served by a common technical stage service. Schauspiel Frankfurt was headed in 1972 by Peter Palitzsch who introduced Mitbestimmung (copartnership), supported by city councillor Hilmar Hoffmann, which became the Frankfurter Modell, a model for other theatres such as Theater Bremen.

In 2004, the organisation was changed to an independent GmbH of the city of Frankfurt, with the artistic directors as chief executive officers, as of 2019 Bernd Loebe and Anselm Weber.

=== General managers (Generalintendanten) ===
- 1880–1900 Emil Claar
- 1917–1920 Karl Zeiss
- 1933–1944 Hans Meissner
- 1951–1965 Harry Buckwitz
- 1968–1972 Ulrich Erfurth

== Map ==
Städtische Bühnen Frankfurt
Double System Städtische Bühnen Frankfurt
1 Theatre
2 Opera
3 Cloud Foyer
4 Chagallsaal
5 Holzfoyer
6 Kammerspiel
7 Revolving Stage
