= Kurt Hellmer =

Kurt Hellmer (26 December 1909 – 11 May 1975) was a literatus who, as a New York literary agent represented Max Frisch and Friedrich Dürrenmatt, amongst others.

== Career ==
A widely experienced director and playwright in Germany and Austria, Hellmer, having fled Nazi Germany in the 1930s, was a prominent figure in the German exile community in New York, editor of Aufbau, forcefully advocating avant garde forms and sensibilities such as the epic theatre of Brecht, the Theatre of the Absurd, advocating and advancing the work of such figures as Erwin Piscator.

Hellmer became a producer and literary agent in the 1940s, representing, in addition to Frisch and Dürrenmatt, such figures as Sławomir Mrożek, Michael Noonan, Jacob Picard, and Jane Rule, and producing the work of authors such as George Bernard Shaw.

Hellmer's ideals and commitments, both aesthetic and social, are illustrated by the instance of Jane Rule for whom he ultimately succeeded in securing publication of her first novel, Desert of the Heart, in 1963, at a time of considerable resistance to the publication of such work.

Amongst others, Hellmer first represented the work of Alen Pol Kobryn
