= Harry Buckwitz =

German actor, theatre director and theatre manager

- Born: 13 March 1904; Munich, Bavaria, Germany
- Died: 28 December 1987 (aged 83); Zürich, Switzerland
- Occupations: Actor; Stage director; Theatre manager
- Organizations: Münchner Kammerspiele; Schauspiel Frankfurt; Schauspielhaus Zürich; Deutsche Akademie der Darstellenden Künste
- Awards: Goetheplakette of Frankfurt

Harry Buckwitz (13 March 1904 – 28 December 1987) was a German actor, theatre director and theatre manager. He was general manager of the Städtische Bühnen Frankfurt from 1951 and 1967, where he was responsible for opera and plays, and initiated a new house for them after the formerly separate theatres had been destroyed in World War II. He is known for Brecht productions, in Frankfurt and at the Schauspielhaus Zürich from 1970 to 1977.

== Career ==
=== Actor ===
Born in Munich as the son of a merchant, Buckwitz studied German, art history and theatre science. He then decided to become an actor and completed an acting course. His first engagement as an actor was at the Münchner Kammerspiele. From 1925, he worked at different German theatres in Mainz, Bochum, Augsburg and Freiburg. In Augsburg, he began to also direct plays.

In 1937, Buckwitz was expelled from the Reichstheaterkammer as Halbjude (half-Jew). He worked internationally. At the beginning of World War II, he ran a hotel in Tanganyika to 1940. He was interned by the Allies, but soon sent back to Germany. From 1941, Buckwitz was director of the Savoy Hotel in Łódź. In 1944, he was drafted to the Wehrmacht.

=== Frankfurt ===
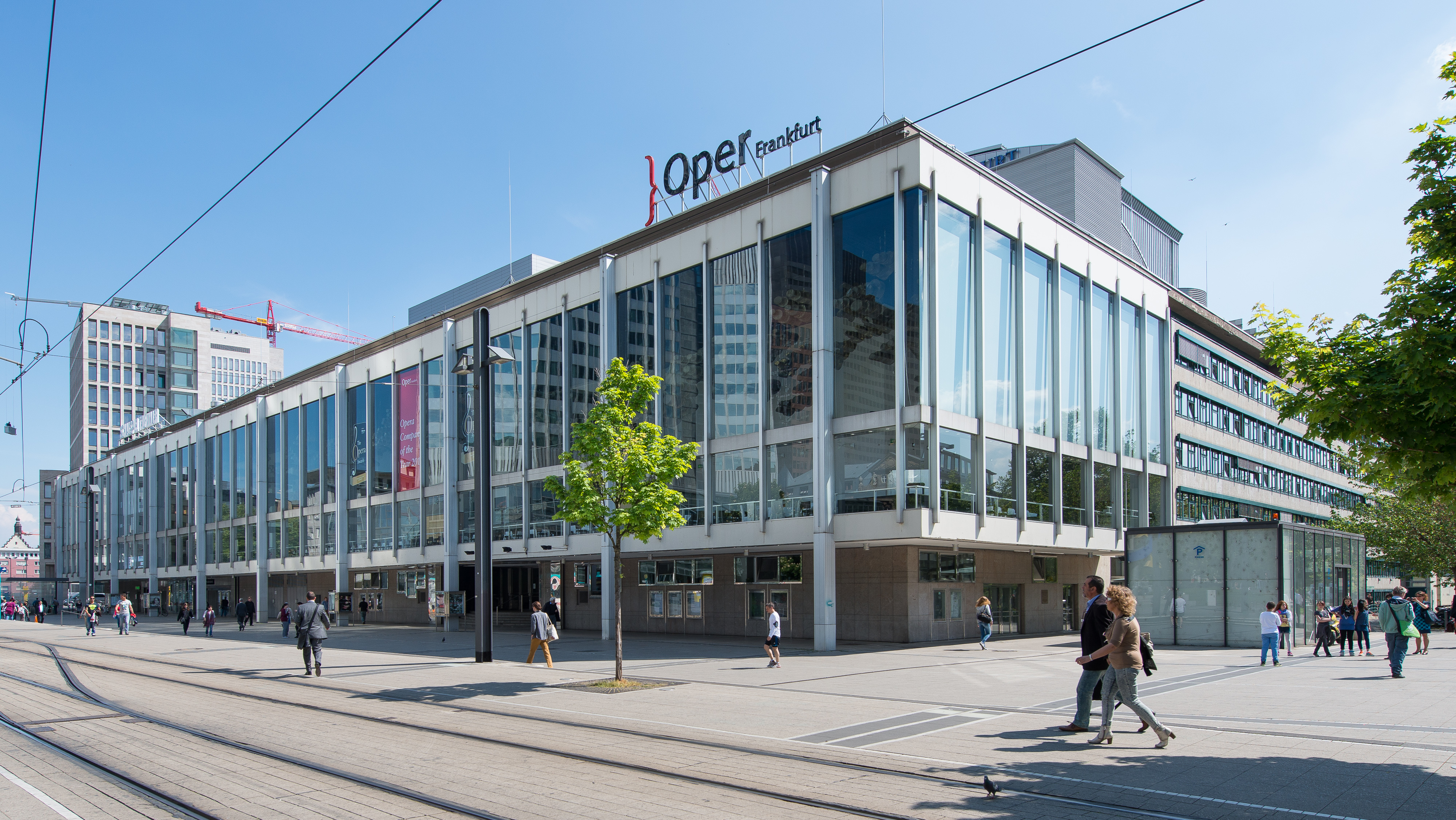
Opern- und Schauspielhaus Frankfurt, built while Buckwitz was general manager, in 2014

After World War II, Buckwitz became manager of Münchner Kammerspiele in 1946. He moved to the Städtische Bühnen Frankfurt in 1951, where he was general director (Generalintendant). In 1952, he recruited Georg Solti as Generalmusikdirektor for the Oper Frankfurt. Buckwitz suggested housing both opera and theatre under one roof. The separate theatres of the company, which had been destroyed during the war, were replaced by one house, inaugurated in December 1963. Its official name is Opern- und Schauspielhaus Frankfurt.

Buckwitz focused on productions of Bertolt Brecht's plays which he directed himself, such as Der kaukasische Kreidekreis in 1955 and Mutter Courage und ihre Kinder in 1958, with Therese Giehse in the title role. He also produced works by contemporary authors such as Friedrich Dürrenmatt, Max Frisch, Rolf Hochhuth, Eugène Ionesco, Arthur Miller, Jean-Paul Sartre and Tennessee Williams, some of them performed in Germany for the first time. He tried to open the theatre to all social classes, achieving an occupancy rate of up to 90 percent. His programs were criticised by some as communist propaganda. After health problems and budget disputes with the city government, Buckwitz announced his resignation in January 1967, serving until his contract ended in August 1968.

In 1962, Buckwitz became vice president of the Deutsche Akademie der Darstellenden Künste.

=== Zürich ===
Buckwitz was director of the Schauspielhaus Zürich from 1970 to 1977. His appointment there led to a fierce controversy with the journalist Hans Habe, who accused him of having once been a henchman of Adolf Hitler, in an article for the newspaper Welt am Sonntag. Habe based his accusation on quotations from the book Heimkehr: Vertrieben aus deutschem Land in Afrika, published in 1940 by the Reichskolonialbund under Buckwitz's name. Buckwitz replied that parts of his manuscripts written in 1940 on his return from internment in Tanganyika in a camp at Berchtesgaden had been altered without his knowledge before publication, while Friedrich Dürrenmatt and Rolf Hochhuth, among others, took sides for Buckwitz. Buckwitz was confirmed in office with a vote of confidence from the Board of Directors of the Zurich Schauspielhaus, which he fulfilled until 1977.

=== Late years ===
In December 1977 Buckwitz appeared as an actor in the role of Luis Concha Córdoba in the German television film Der Tod des Camilo Torres oder: Die Wirklichkeit hält viel aus, directed by Eberhard Itzenplitz. He worked as a freelance director until his death. At his request, he was not buried in his last place of residence, Zürich, but in Frankfurt. His extensive written legacy is held by the Academy of Arts, Berlin.

== Awards ==
- 1964: Goethe Plaque of the City of Frankfurt
