= Ivan Nagel =

Ivan Nagel (28 June 1931 – 9 April 2012) was a German theater scholar, critic and former theater director of Hungarian origin.

== Life ==
Ivan Nagel was born in Budapest. He came from a Jewish family who fled their home because of the Second World War, and therefore survived the Holocaust. After the war, Nagel wanted to study in Budapest. This was refused to him by the communist rulers since he was a bourgeois. He fled to Switzerland in 1948. In the 1950s Nagel lived and studied as a refugee first in Paris and Zürich then in Frankfurt am Main. In Frankfurt he studied philosophy under Theodor W. Adorno who later helped him to avoid a threatening deportation (as an "undesirable asylum seeker"). After his studies, he worked as a theater critic in Munich and became the chief drama director of the Munich Kammerspiele. In 1972 he was appointed the director of the Deutsches Schauspielhaus (German Play House) in Hamburg and stayed there until 1979. During this time he gathered numerous renowned producers around him. He would become famous from this time on, preceding the productions of Peter Zadek who later, in the 1980s, became the director of this stage. Nagel went to New York in 1981 and lived there until 1983. He returned to Germany with the idea of a theater festival that would give an overview of theater development of different cultures around the world. The festival, Theater der Welt (Theater of the World), still takes place in varying German cities. It has given the German public the opportunity to see prominent theater productions like those of Peter Brook and Ariane Mnouchkine. From 1985 to 1988 Nagel was the director of the Staatstheater Stuttgart, and from 1989 to 1996 Professor of History and Aesthetics at Berlin University of the Arts. He died, aged 80, in Berlin.

His stage achievements aside, Nagel is famous for his theatre theory and portraits of theater directors like Fritz Kortner, Peter Stein and Peter Zadek. His book about Mozart's Opera Autonomy and Mercy has been translated into English, French and Japanese.

== Achievements ==
Ivan Nagel received the 2000 Moses Mendelssohn Prize and the 2002 Order of Merit of Berlin (Verdienstorden des Landes Berlin). In 2003, he was honored with the Bundesverdienstkreuz and the Ernst Bloch Prize.
