= Schauspiel Frankfurt =

Theatre company in Germany

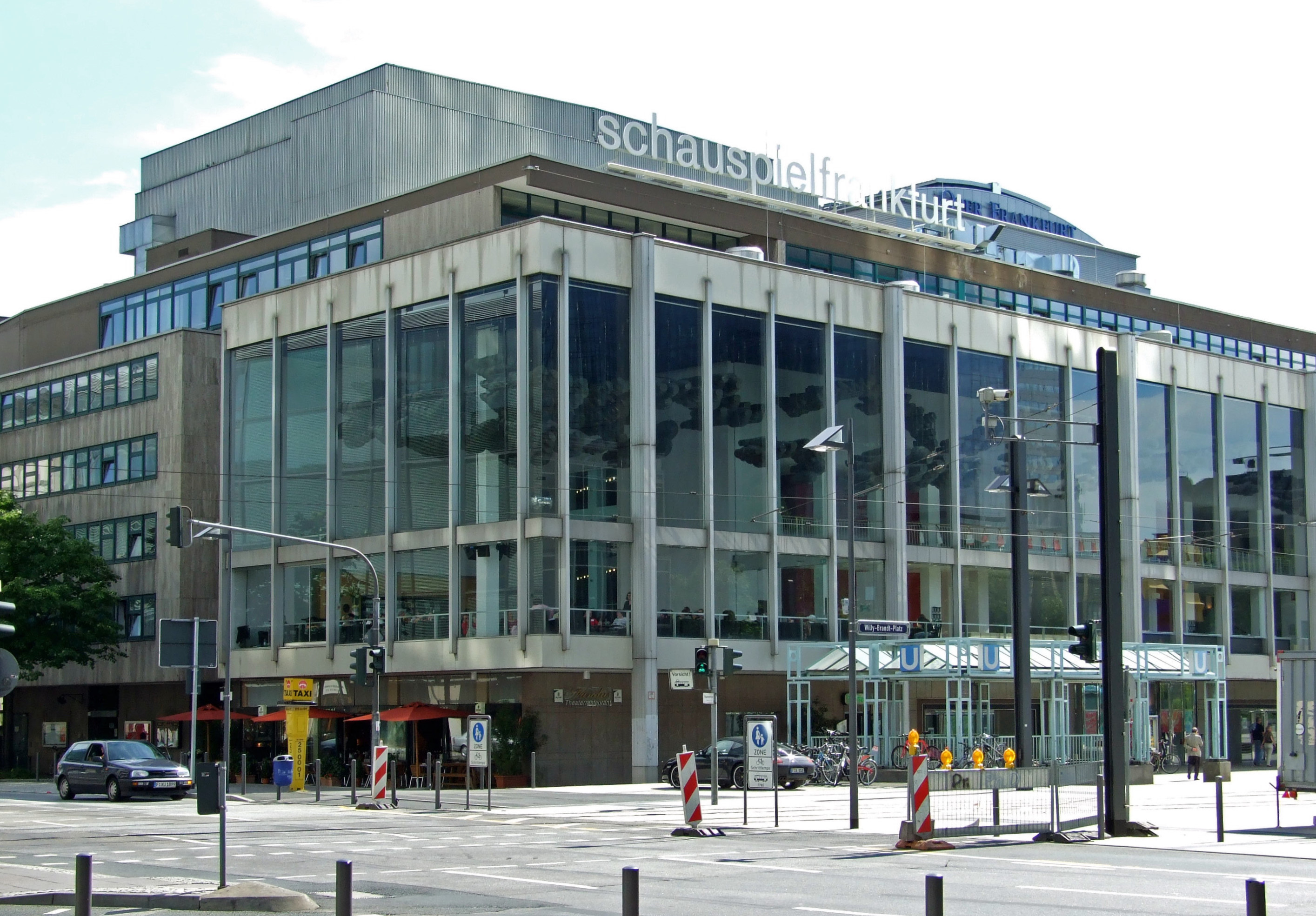
- Schauspielhaus in 2007
- Location: Frankfurt, Germany
- Intendant: Anselm Weber
- Parent organization: Städtische Bühnen Frankfurt
- Website: schauspielfrankfurt.de
- Building details

General information
- Coordinates: 50°06′29″N 8°40′27″E

Other information
- Seating capacity: 689 (Schauspielhaus)
- Public transit: Willy-Brandt-Platz; 11, 12, 14, 15, 16, 17, 18, 20 Willy-Brandt-Platz; N11, N12, N4, N5, N8 Willy-Brandt-Platz

The Schauspiel Frankfurt is the municipal theatre company for plays in Frankfurt, Hesse, Germany. It is part of Städtische Bühnen Frankfurt.

== History ==
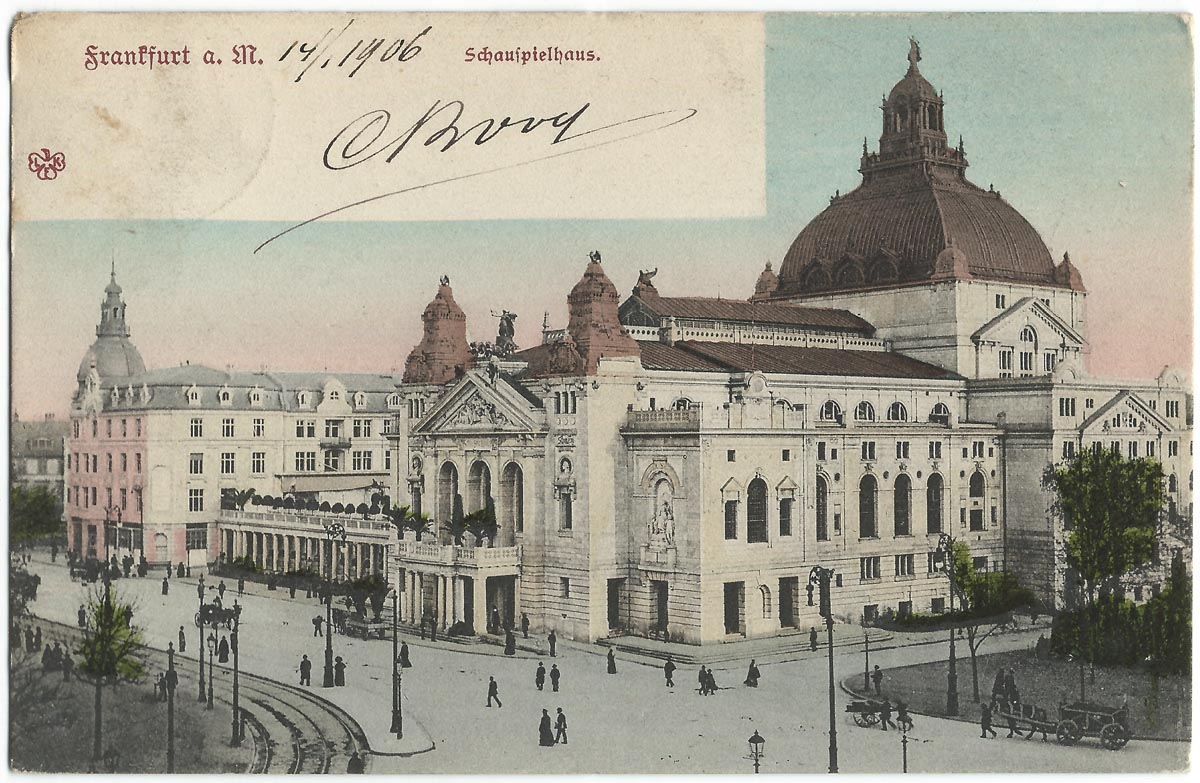
Schauspielhaus in 1906

In the late 1770s the theatre principal Abel Seyler was based in Frankfurt, and established the city's theatrical life.

Opened in 1782, the Comoedienhaus (comedy house) was the first permanent venue of the Frankfurt theatre, both plays and opera (drama and opera). Its traditional house, the Schauspielhaus, built in 1902 by architect Heinrich Seeling at the Theaterplatz (now Willy-Brandt-Platz) was destroyed in World War II during an air raid in 1944. In 1926, Brecht's A Respectable Wedding premiered.

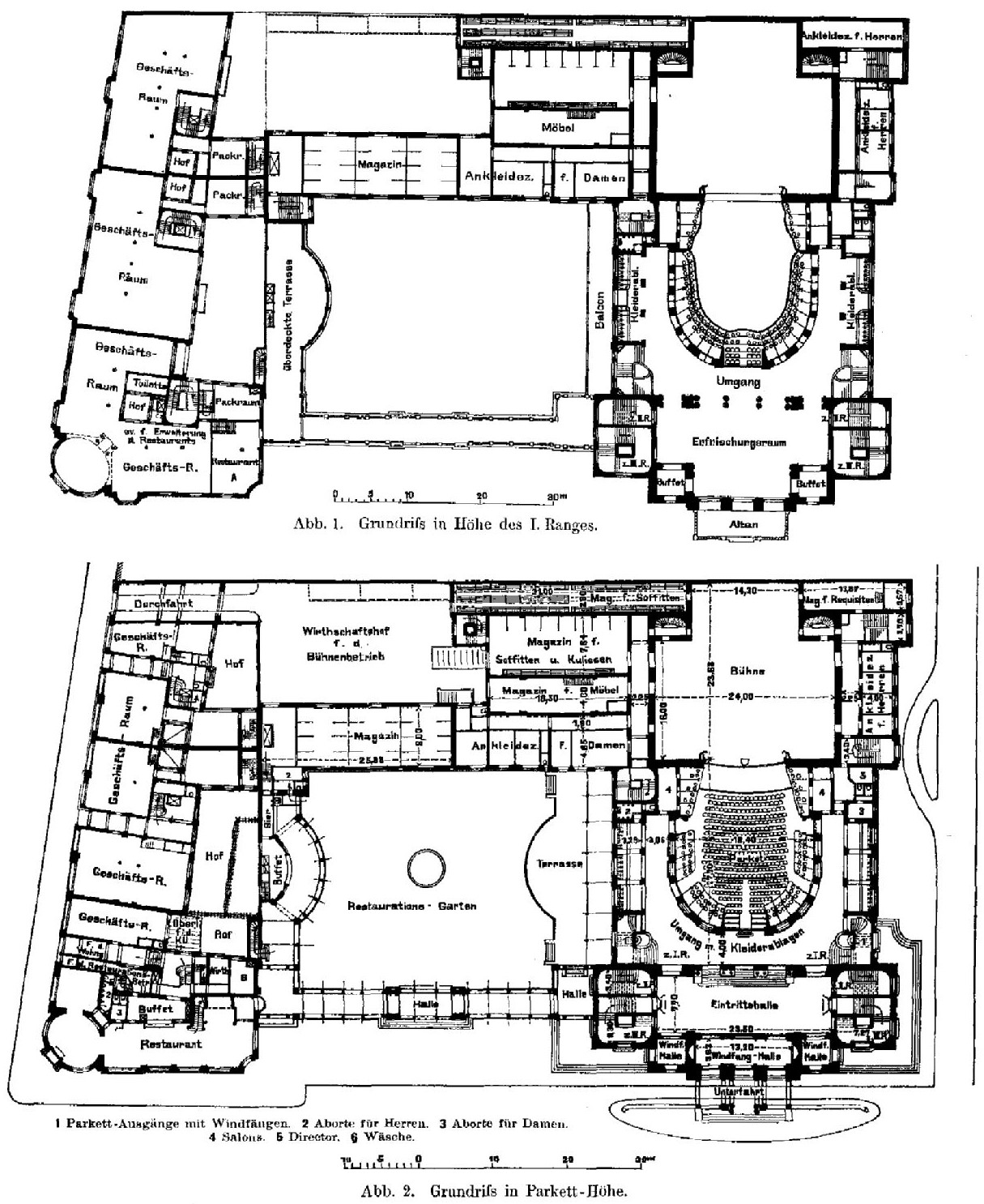
Plans of the historic Schauspielhaus Frankfurt 1899

Main temporary location of the Schauspiel from 1945 to 1963 was the Börsensaal. A new house for opera and play was built at the Theaterplatz, completed in 1963. When Harry Buckwitz was general manager, the ruins of the Schauspielhaus were restructured to house both play and opera. Buckwitz focused on plays by Bertolt Brecht, including the world premiere of Die Gesichte der Simone Machard in 1957.

On 31 October 1985, the planned first performance of Fassbinder's Garbage, the City and Death caused a theater scandal. Spectators occupied the stage and prevented the actors from continuing to play.

As of 2023, a new building for the Städtische Bühnen is planned.

== Venues ==
- Schauspielhaus (689 seats), Willy-Brandt-Platz
- Kammerspiele (185 seats), Neue Mainzer Straße
- Bockenheimer Depot (400 seats), Carlo-Schmid-Platz
- Box (70 seats), Willy-Brandt-Platz

== Städtische Bühnen ==
Schauspiel Frankfurt and Oper Frankfurt are part of the municipal Städtische Bühnen Frankfurt am Main GmbH.

== Intendant ==
- 1879–1912 Emil Claar
- 1912–1916 Max Behrend
- 1916–1920 Karl Zeiss
- 1920–1929 Richard Weichert
- 1929–1933 Alwin Kronbacher
- 1933–1944 Hans Meissner
- 1945–1947 Toni Impekoven
- 1947–1951 Richard Weichert / Heinz Hilpert
- 1951–1968 Harry Buckwitz
- 1968–1972 Ulrich Erfurth
- 1972–1980 Peter Palitzsch
- 1980–1981 Wilfried Minks / Johannes Schaaf
- 1981–1985 Adolf Dresen
- 1985–1990 Günther Rühle
- 1990–1991 Hans-Peter Doll
- 1991–2001 Peter Eschberg
- 2001–2009 Elisabeth Schweeger
- 2009–2017 Oliver Reese
- Since 2017 Anselm Weber

== See also ==
- Oper Frankfurt
- Bockenheimer Depot
