= Nestroy Theatre Prize =

Austrian theatre award

The Nestroy Theatre Prize is an Austrian theatre award named after the poet Johann Nestroy. In 2000, the city of Vienna decided to combine two less noticed theatre awards: the Kainz Medal and the Nestroy Ring for Viennese Satire. The prize honours outstanding achievements at the Viennese and other Austrian theatres. The prize has been awarded annually in eight up to fourteen categories. Its ceremony is held in Vienna and broadcast live on national television.

== Categories ==
- Best German-language performance
- Best direction
- Best equipment
- Best actress
- Best actor
- Best supporting role
- Best young talent
- Best off production
- Best play – Authors prize
- Lifetime achievement
- Special prize
- Audience award
- Best federal state performance

== Recipients best direction ==
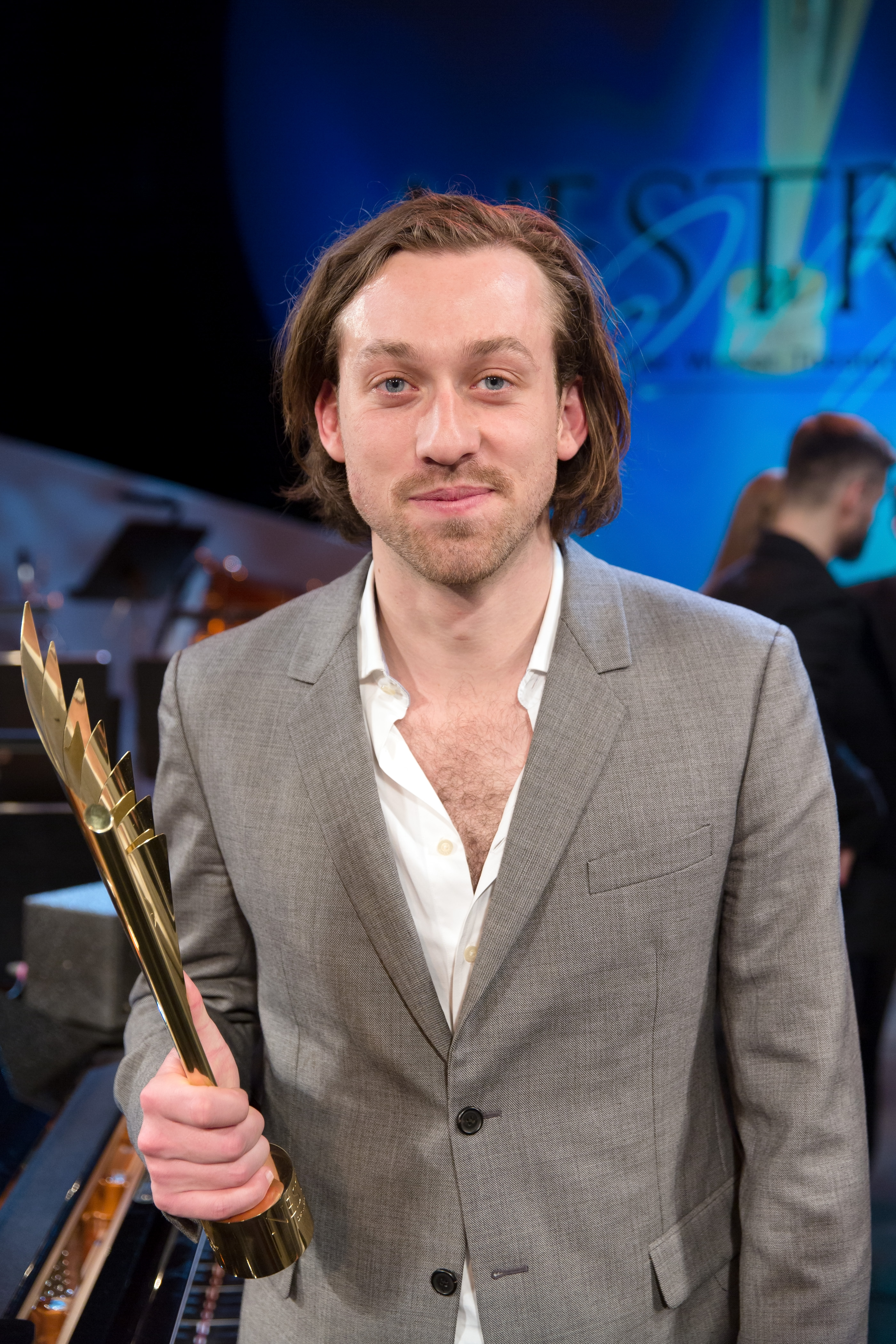
Simon Stone at the Nestroy Theatre Awards 2015 (Ronacher, Vienna, Austria)

Year	Recipient	Production	Author
2000	Luc Bondy	Die Möwe (The Seagull)	Anton Chekhov
2001	Peter Zadek	Rosmersholm	Henrik Ibsen
2002	Michael Schottenberg	Der Talisman	Johann Nestroy
2003	Andrea Breth	Emilia Galotti	Gotthold Ephraim Lessing
2004	Stephan Kimmig	Das goldene Vlies (The Golden Fleece)	Franz Grillparzer
2005	Christoph Marthaler	Schutz vor der Zukunft	
2006	Karin Beier	Kleinbürger (The Philistines)	Maxim Gorky
2007	Grzegorz Jarzyna	Medea	
2008	Stefan Bachmann	Verbrennungen (Incendies)	Wajdi Mouawad
2009	Martin Kušej	Der Weibsteufel	Karl Schönherr
2010	Alvis Hermanis	Eine Familie (August: Osage County)	Tracy Letts
2011	Andrea Breth	Zwischenfälle	
2012	Stephanie Mohr	Woyzeck & The Tiger Lillies	Georg Büchner
2013	Michael Thalheimer	Elektra	Hugo von Hofmannsthal
2014	Krystian Lupa	Holzfällen (Woodcutters)	Thomas Bernhard
2015	Simon Stone	John Gabriel Borkman	Henrik Ibsen
2016	Andrea Breth	Diese Geschichte von Ihnen (This Story of Yours)	John Hopkins
2017	Elmar Goerden	Stage version of Die Verdammten (The Damned)	Luchino Visconti
2018	Dušan David Pařízek	Vor Sonnenaufgang (Before Sunrise)	Ewald Palmetshofer after Gerhart Hauptmann
2019	Johan Simons	Woyzeck	Georg Büchner
2020	Florentina Holzinger	TANZ. Eine sylphidische Träumerei in Stunts	
2021	Barbara Frey	Automatenbüfett	
2022	Claudia Bauer	humanistää! – eine abschaffung der sparten	Ernst Jandl
2023	Tomas Schweigen	Faarm Animaal	George Orwell
2024	Kornél Mundruczó	Parallax	Kata Wéber

== Recipients best actress ==
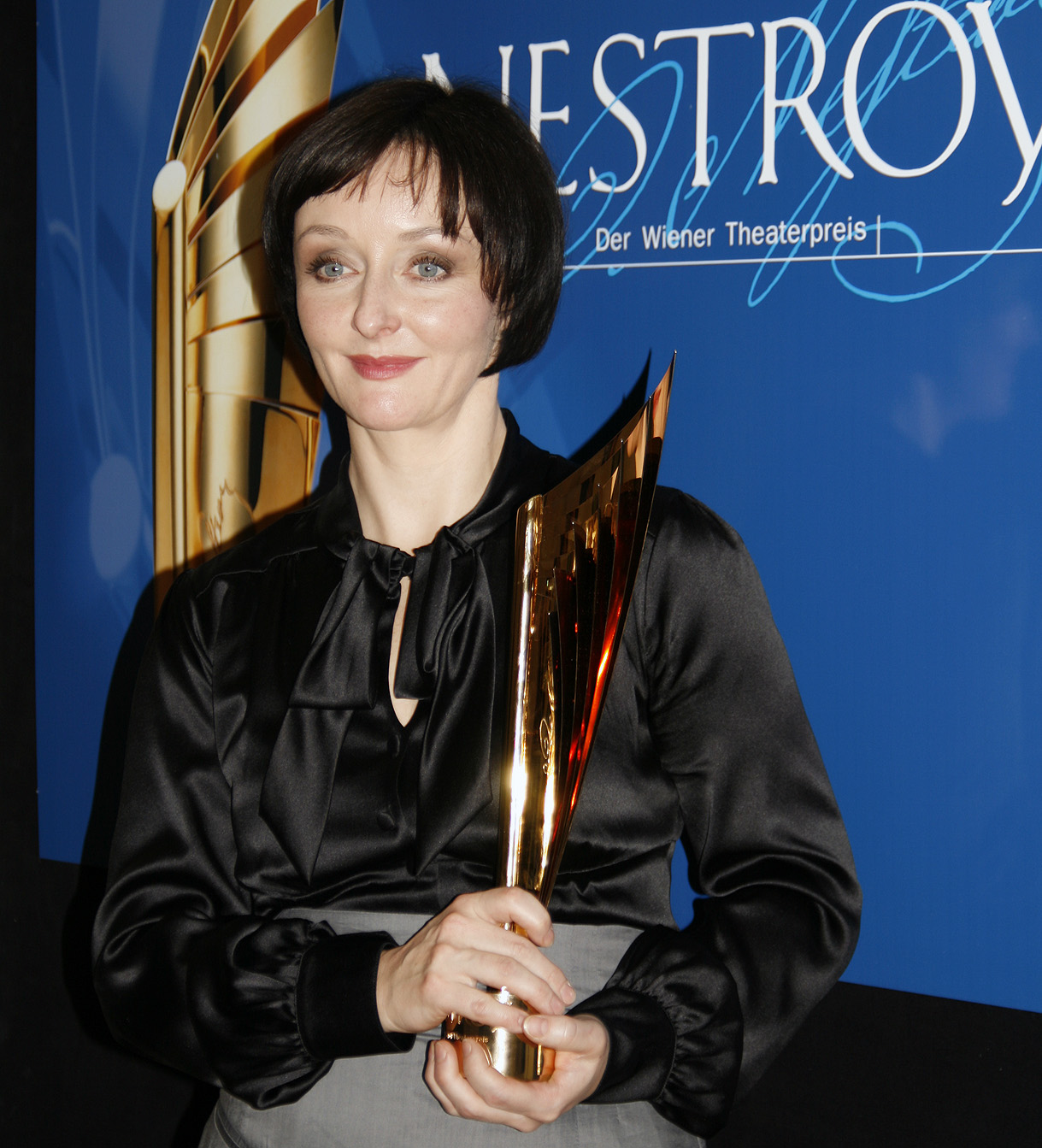
Actress Regina Fritsch, honored as 'Best Actress' at the Nestroy-Theaterpreis 2008 (Etablissement Ronacher, Vienna)

Jahr	Actress	Production	Role
2000	Birgit Doll	Wer hat Angst vor Virginia Woolf?	Martha
2001	Judith Engel	Bash	Sue/Die Frau
2002	Ulli Maier	Der Mann ohne Eigenschaften	Agathe
2003	Maria Happel	Die Zeit der Plancks	Maria
2004	Birgit Minichmayr	Das goldene Vlies	Medea
2005	Sunnyi Melles	Geschichten aus dem Wiener Wald	Valerie
2006	Edith Clever	Schlaf	Die ältere Frau
2007	Sylvie Rohrer	Medea. A project by Grzegorz Jarzyna & Über Tiere	Medea, Monolog
2008	Regina Fritsch	Verbrennungen	Nawal
2009	Birgit Minichmayr	Der Weibsteufel	Weib
2010	Kirsten Dene	Eine Familie	Violet Weston
2011	Sarah Viktoria Frick	Stallerhof	Beppi
2012	Dörte Lyssewski	Endstation Sehnsucht (A Streetcar Named Desire)	Blanche DuBois
2013	Christiane von Poelnitz	Elektra (Hofmannsthal)	Elektra
2014	Nicole Heesters	Vor dem Ruhestand	Vera
2015	Elisabeth Orth	die unverheiratete	Die Alte
2016	Sona MacDonald	Fräulein Julie & Blue Moon	Julie, Sie
2017	Andrea Jonasson	Stage version of The Damned	Sophie von Essenbeck
2018	Caroline Peters	Hotel Strindberg	multiple roles
2019	Steffi Krautz	Endstation Sehnsucht	Blanche DuBois
2020	Caroline Peters	Schwarzwasser	
2021	Lina Beckmann	Richard the Kid & the King	Richard
2022	Sarah Viktoria Frick	Adern	Aloisia
2023	Saioa Alvarez Ruiz	Ophelia's Got Talent	
2024	Julia Edtmeier	Amadeus	Mozart

== Recipients best actor ==
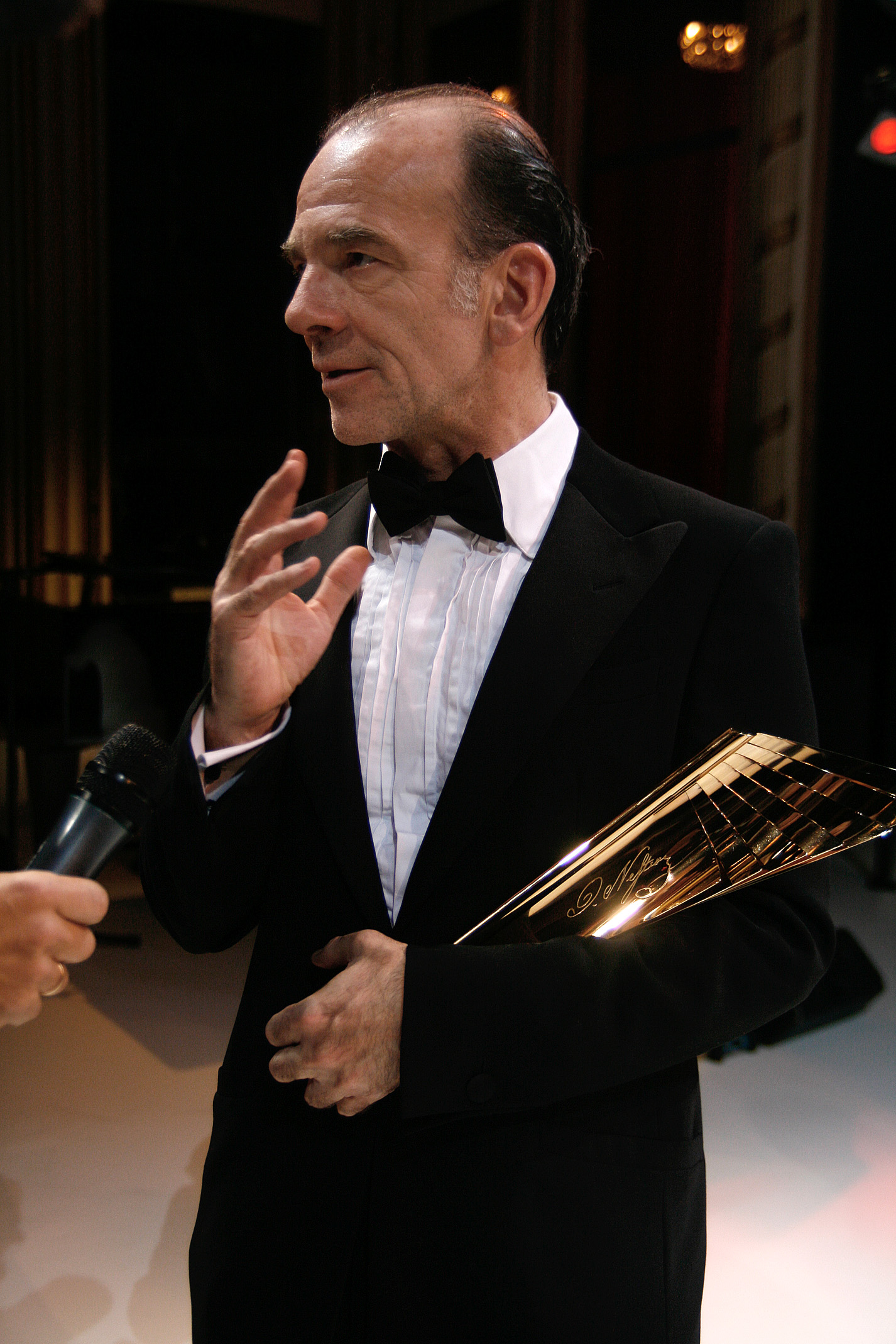
Martin Wuttke at the award ceremony of the Nestroy Theater Prize 2010 in the Burgtheater in Vienna

Year	Actor	Production	Role
2000	Gert Voss	Die Möwe	Trigorin
2001	Sven-Eric Bechtolf	Drei Mal Leben	Hubert Finidori
2002	Sven-Eric Bechtolf	Das weite Land	Hofreiter
2003	Markus Hering	Chorphantasie	Conductor
2004	Toni Slama	Automatenbüffet	Adam
2005	Michael Maertens	König Ottokars Glück und Ende	Rudolf von Habsburg
2005	Nicholas Ofczarek	Zu ebener Erde und erster Stock, König Ottokars Glück und Ende	Johann, Zawisch
2006	Nicholas Ofczarek	Höllenangst	Wendelin
2007	Bernhard Schir	Das Fest	Christian
2008	Markus Hering	Verbrennungen, Freier Fall, Pool (Kein Wasser)	Hermile, Erich, C
2009	André Jung	Das letzte Band / Bis dass der Tag euch scheidet oder Eine Frage des Lichts	Krapp
2010	Martin Wuttke	Das Begräbnis & Peking Opel	Christian
2011	Max Mayer	Grillenparz & Bruno Schulz: Messias	Hunter called Fischer, multiple roles
2012	Joachim Meyerhoff	Die Kommune	
2013	Gregor Bloéb	Jägerstätter (Mitterer)	Franz Jägerstätter
2014	August Diehl	Hamlet	Hamlet
2015	Martin Wuttke	John Gabriel Borkman	John Gabriel Borkman
2016	Rainer Galke	Alte Meister	Irrsigler
2017	Joachim Meyerhoff	Die Welt im Rücken	
2018	Peter Simonischek	The Who and the What	Afzal
2019	Steven Scharf	Medea (Simon Stone) and Woyzeck	Lucas and Franz Woyzeck
2020	Franz Pätzold	Die Bakchen	Dionysos
2021	Michael Maertens	Der Leichenverbrenner	Karel Kopfrkingl
2022	Samouil Stoyanov	humanistää! – eine abschaffung der sparten	
2023	Michael Maertens	Das weite Land	Friedrich Hofreiter
2024	Claudius von Stolzmann	Der Himbeerpflücker	Zagl

== Recipients best play – authors prize ==
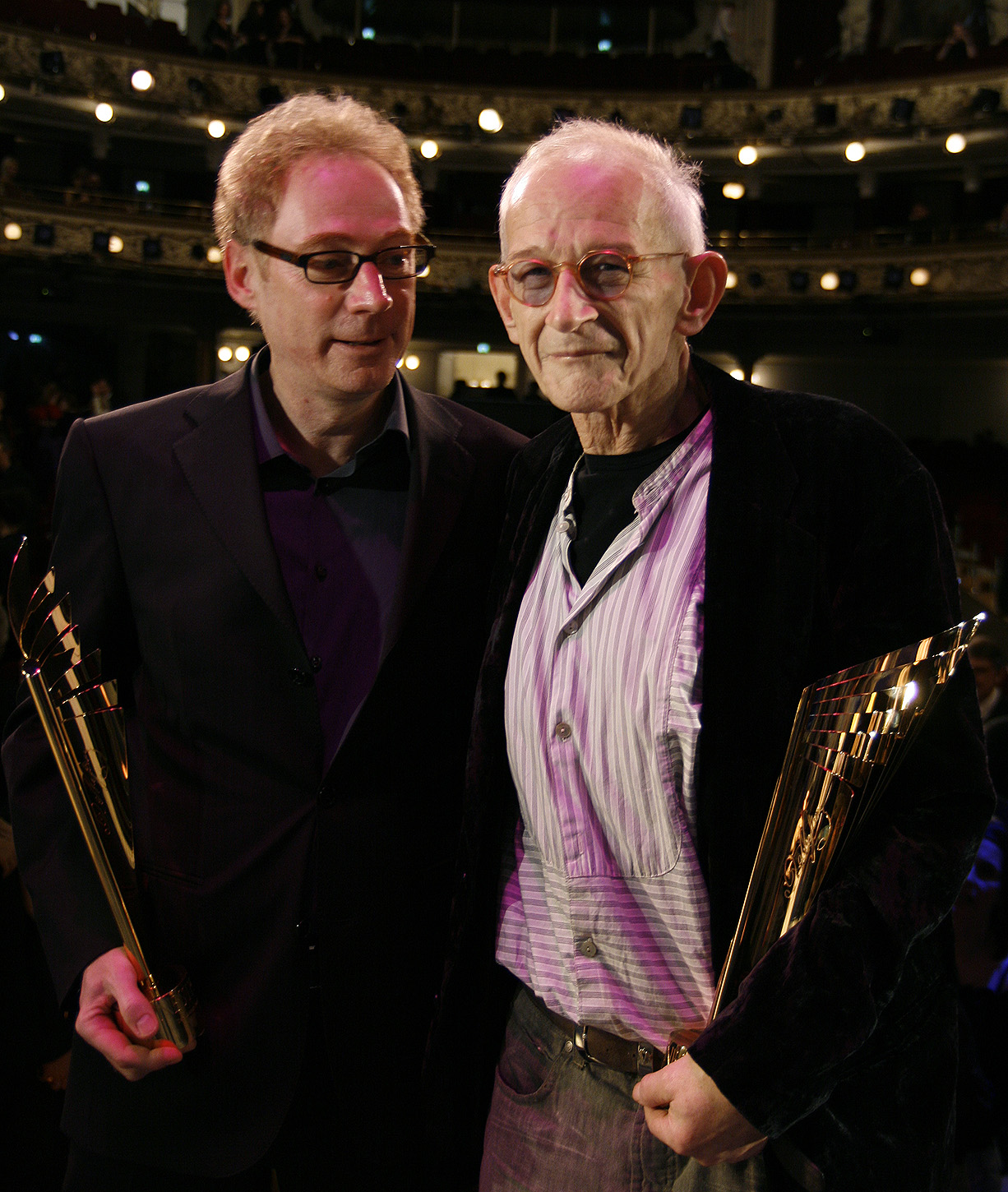
Playwright Gert Jonke (r.) and actor André Pohl (l.) at the Nestroy-Theaterpreis 2008 (Etablissement Ronacher, Vienna)

Year	Play	Author
2000	Der Name	Jon Fosse
2001	Die Unsichtbare. Tirade an drei Stränden	Christoph Ransmayr
2002	Push up 1 – 3	Roland Schimmelpfennig
2003	Chorphantasie	Gert Jonke
2004	Die Ziege oder Wer ist Sylvia? (The Goat, or Who Is Sylvia?)	Edward Albee
2005	Hunt oder Der totale Februar	Franzobel
2006	Die versunkene Kathedrale (The Sunken Cathedral)	Gert Jonke
2007	Das purpurne Muttermal	René Pollesch
2008	Freier Fall	Gert Jonke
2009	Besuch bei dem Vater (Visit at the Father)	Roland Schimmelpfennig
2010	worst case	Kathrin Röggla
2011	Immer noch Sturm (Storm Still)	Peter Handke
2012	Geister in Princeton (Ghosts in Princeton)	Daniel Kehlmann
2013	Schatten (Euridyke sagt) (Shadow (Eurydice Says))	Elfriede Jelinek
2014	Die Ereignisse (The Events)	David Greig
2015	Die lächerliche Finsternis	Wolfram Lotz
2016	Lost and Found	Yael Ronen
2017	Geächtet (Disgraced)	Ayad Akhtar
2018	jedermann (stirbt)	Ferdinand Schmalz
2019	Hass-Triptychon – Wege aus der Krise (Hate Triptych – Ways out of the crisis)	Sibylle Berg
2020	Schwarzwasser	Elfriede Jelinek
2021	Rand	Miroslava Svolikova
2022	Adern	Lisa Wentz
2023	karpatenflecken	Thomas Perle
2024	Die vielen Stimmen meines Bruders	Magdalena Schrefel, Valentin Schuster

== Recipients lifetime achievement ==
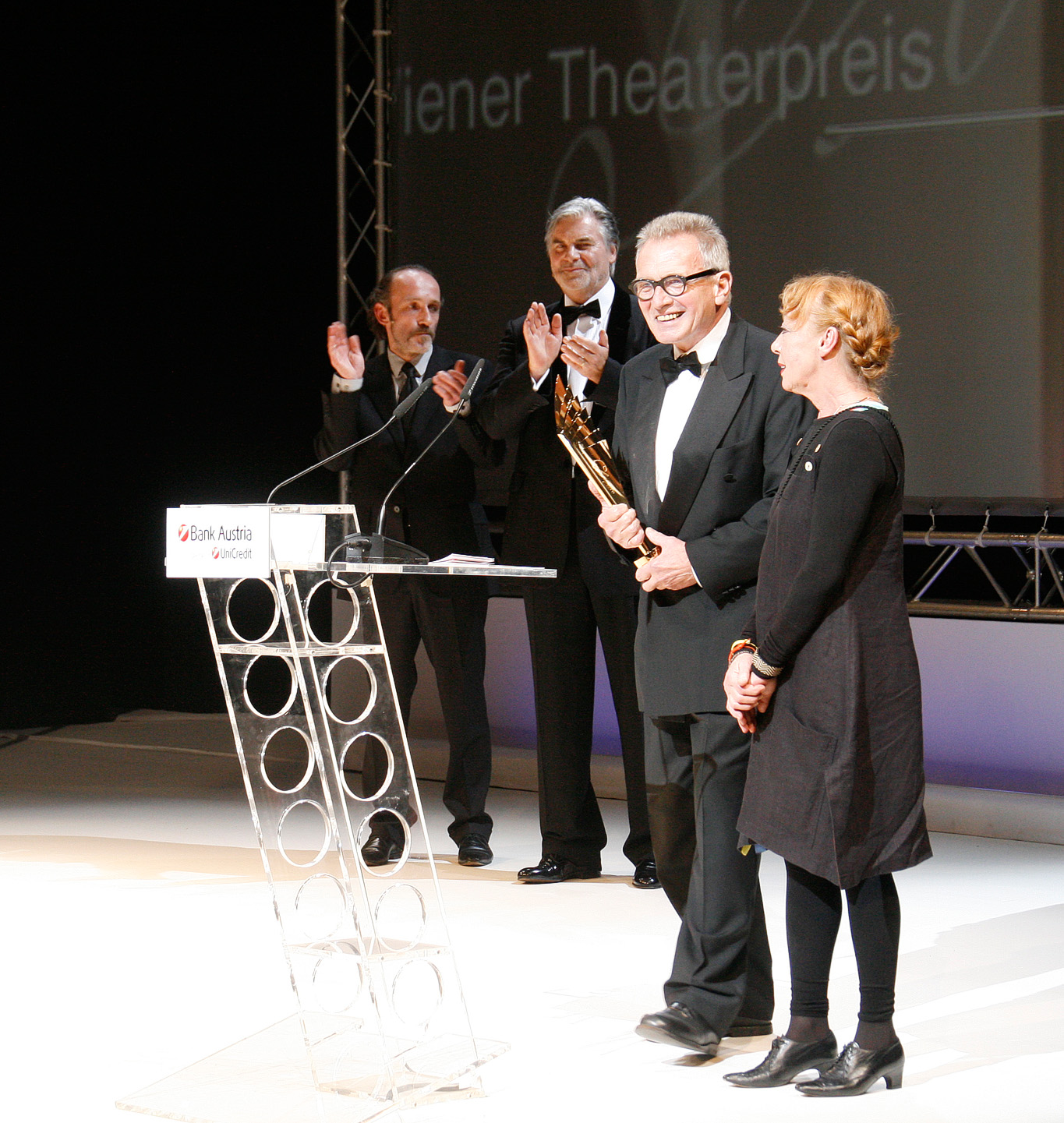
Ulrike Kaufmann and Erwin Piplits at the award ceremony of the Nestroy Theater Prize 2010 in the Burgtheater in Vienna

Year	Recipient	Laudator
2000	Otto Schenk	Sunnyi Melles
2001	George Tabori	Angelica Domröse
2002	Claus Peymann	André Heller
2003	Gusti Wolf	Michael Heltau
2004	Hans Gratzer	Michael Schottenberg
2005	Michael Heltau	Klaus Bachler
2006	Walter Schmidinger	Klaus Maria Brandauer
2007	Hilde Sochor	Paulus Manker
2008	Peter Zadek	Matthias Matussek
2009	Otto Tausig	Gerhard Klingenberg
2010	Ulrike Kaufmann and Erwin Piplits	Karl Markovics
2011	Peter Turrini	Kirsten Dene, text by Elfriede Jelinek
2012	Karlheinz Hackl	Heinz Marecek
2013	Luc Bondy	Johanna Wokalek
2014	Klaus Maria Brandauer	István Szabó
2015	Achim Freyer	Hermann Beil
2016	Frank Castorf	Jasna Fritzi Bauer
2017	Kirsten Dene	Michael Maertens
2018	Peter Handke	Klaus Maria Brandauer
2019	Andrea Breth	Roland Koch
2020	Christoph Marthaler	
2021	Elfriede Jelinek	
2022	Elisabeth Orth	Karin Bergmann
2023	Emmy Werner	Karl Markovics
2024	Felix Mitterer	
2025	Martin Schwab	
