= Amras =

1964 book by Thomas Bernhard

Amras is a novella by Thomas Bernhard from 1964 that describes the fate of two brothers and their despair at life and their surroundings. The story takes its name from the Innsbruck district of Amras, one of the locations in the story.

== Origin ==
Thomas Bernhard's novellas Der Kulterer and Der Italiener were written in 1962 and 1963 respectively, but were not published until later. After his first novel Frost, which was published in 1963 and established his literary success, the story Amras followed in 1964.

Bernhard said of Amras in 1984 that it was "still (his) favorite book."

== Plot ==
Together with his parents and his brother Walter, who was a year younger, the 20-year-old K. wanted to kill himself. By chance the two brothers were found before they died, but their parents were killed. To protect the two young men from the public, their maternal uncle took them to a tower in Amras, which they already knew from their childhood.

In the tower, the two brothers come to terms with their fate and are haunted by memories of their parents. For the scientifically inclined K. and the musical Walter, the new abode is both a prison and a place of refuge. The reasons for the collective suicide (attempt) lay in the mother's epilepsy and the father's heavy debts. Walter also has epilepsy. After it worsened, he has to regularly visit an internist in Innsbruck again, which means a renewed confrontation with society for the protagonists after their isolation. After a visit to the internist and his brother's particularly bad seizures, K. leaves the tower to talk to the circus people camped nearby in their winter quarters. Meanwhile, Walter kills himself by jumping out of the tower window.

His uncle arranges for K. to move to Aldrans, where he owns a forester's lodge. K. works and lives with the local lumberjacks, but remains isolated and continues to immerse himself in his thoughts and memories. He tries in vain to buy back his brother's pledged piano scores and music manuscripts. He goes for walks with a young woman. K. breaks off contact with Hollhof, a family friend. At the end of the story, he also turns away from the natural sciences. He leaves Aldrans and asks his uncle for forgiveness and understanding. He will no longer pursue his studies at the university, but only "within myself [...]." Eight weeks later, K. sees himself in his new place of residence "supposedly safe, to make an attempt to clear up my inappropriate conduct", It is suggested that he could be in a psychiatric clinic.

== Structure and narrative style ==
The narrative is preceded by a sentence by Novalis: "The essence of disease is as dark as the essence of life." – from his Fragments I.

The text is essentially carried by K.'s narrative, which reproduces the events from his perception, his reflections, memories, fears and impressions. Letters from K. to people close to him are interspersed rather abruptly, above all to Hollhof, "a Merano psychiatrist [and] friend of [his] father", and to his uncle. The text is divided into chapters with headings. There are also literary fragments by Walter and notebook entries. In the section "In Aldrans", three Italian sentences – unmarked quotations from Leonardo da Vinci – are inserted individually and in italics below the notes and letters. According to Marquardt, Bernhard uses this style of writing to depict "the inability to draw a coherent picture of the outside world [...]". The text focuses on the protagonists' reflections, their memories and their thoughts on illness and death.

The sentence structure is characterized by the unusual length and interlacing of the sentences and the large number of interspersed aphorisms. Bernhard uses complex and sometimes unfinished sentences to illustrate the confusion and deterioration of the protagonists' mental state. The brothers' distance from their environment and other people is not only evident in their retreat into the enclosed space of the tower, but also in their way of speaking. The excessive use of scientific and abstract terms is intended to show the distance of the brothers K. and Walter from society and everyday social life.

== Motifs ==
The tower: It has an ambivalent connotation in the story. On the one hand, it is a place of refuge for the brothers shortly after their parents' suicide and their own suicide attempt and protects them from the gossip of Innsbruck society. In addition, some childhood memories are associated with the tower. As the story progresses, however, the tower becomes a physical and psychological prison. The brothers are isolated and begin to fantasize in solitude. The isolation in the tower is similar to the seclusion in the house in Herrengasse. Furthermore, auto-aggressive behavior develops and Walter's epilepsy worsens. The brothers seek distraction and occupation in their sciences, but they are disappointed.

Tyrolean epilepsy: The illness inherited from the mother leads to the downfall of the family, it also affects the healthy family members and is the main reason for the capitulation to life. It serves to encode the dangerous provinciality and for the brothers it is both disturbance, identity and idiosyncrasy.

Nature: The nature surrounding the brothers is a mirror of their inner state. The attributes that Bernhard uses to describe nature are also attributes that represent the inner world of K. and Walter. The brothers cannot be separated from nature. By blurring the boundary between outside and inside, Bernhard manages to make the boundary between reality and fantasy indistinct.

Darkness: This is a metaphor for the degenerate world that encompasses everything that exists. This terminology, which describes the essence of existence, can also be found in Frost.

== Editions ==
- Bernhard, Thomas (2003). Three Novellas: Amras, Playing Watten, Walking. Chicago: Univ. of Chicago Press. ISBN 978-0-226-04432-3.
