= Extinction (Bernhard novel) =

1986 novel by Thomas Bernhard

- Author: Thomas Bernhard
- Original title: Auslöschung
- Translator: David McLintock
- Language: German
- Series: Phoenix Fiction
- Genre: novel, Monologue
- Publisher: Alfred A. Knopf
- Publication date: 1986
- Publication place: Austria
- English publication date: 1996
- Media type: Print (Hardback & Paperback)
- Pages: 325 pp
- ISBN: 978-0-394-57253-6 (and 9780140186826 in the Penguin Books edition 1996)
- OCLC: 31514543
- Dewey Decimal: 833/.914 20
- LC Class: PT2662.E7 A9513 1995
- Preceded by: Yes (Ja)
- Followed by: Three Novellas (Amras, Watten, Gehen)

Extinction is the last of Thomas Bernhard's novels. It was originally published in German in 1986.

== Plot summary ==
Extinction is ostensibly a posthumously published autobiography written by its protagonist, Franz-Joseph Murau (who frequently discusses his plans to write a book called Extinction). It is told in two parts, ‘The Telegram’ and ‘The Will’, each of which consists of one long paragraph. The novel employs the stream-of-consciousness technique and has very little plot; instead, it consists of Murau’s internal monologue, which alternates between plot description, extended reflection on past events, philosophical musing, and satirical criticism of contemporary Austria.

Murau lives in Rome in self-exile, obsessed and angry with his identity as an Austrian, and resolves never to return to the family estate of Wolfsegg. He is surrounded by a group of artistic and intellectual friends, and intends to continue living what he calls the Italianate way. When he hears of his parents' deaths, he finds himself master of Wolfsegg and must decide its fate.

Murau has cut himself off from his family and sought to establish an intellectual life as a tutor in Rome. In the first half of the novel, he reflects on the spiritual, intellectual, and moral impoverishment of his family to his Roman student Gambetti. He only has respect for his Uncle Georg, who similarly cut himself off from the family and helped Murau to save himself. In the second section, he returns to his family’s estate, Wolfsegg, for the funeral, as well as to determine the disposal of the estate, which is now in his hands.

Throughout the novel, Murau talks about the void that he has created for himself via exaggeration combined with understatement. Murau then incriminates all of art in this role of unjustified absolution. To Gambetti, the "great" of "great art" was just that; when he thinks on his villa in Wolfsegg, "great" comes to mean something new: criminal art that has the power to make people pardon themselves for mortal sins.

== Imagery, style and themes ==
In this last of his novels, according to professor Thomas Cousineau, "Bernhard [uses] repetition to achieve a cathartic effect while delivering himself of a parthian shot at the very language without which his own literary achievements would have been inconceivable."

There's something utopian in this novel, underscored by the ending, where Wolfsegg’s entire estate is donated to the Jewish community of Vienna. It's a radical and destructive utopia, a utopia that annihilates Murau himself, and which is at any rate overwhelmed by resentment and hate for his birthplace. But Bernhard wouldn't be Bernhard if such a denigration, so relentless and ruthless, didn't mutate in a vertiginous cascade of words with compulsive musical pitches of extraordinary beauty (and beautifully rendered by translator David McLintock) – a melodic aria whose lightness sharply contrasts with the gloomy character of Murau's proclamations. It's this very rhythm – an inexorable, spiralling mechanism of hyperboles and superlatives – which confers to the narrative the specific vis comica so characteristic of Bernhard's work. Exaggeration changes into grotesque, tragedy into comedy. And often within the text, one hears a long liberating laughter. "Everything is ridiculous when one thinks of death", Bernhard wrote, and very few other contemporary authors have demonstrated how thin the line is that separates the tragic from the comic.

== Excerpts ==
- In a remarkable passage, the narrator Murau, an expatriate professor based in Rome, talks about the search for his childhood in an Austrian country estate, Wolfsegg:

"In Rome I sometimes think of Wolfsegg and tell myself that I have only to go back there in order to rediscover my childhood. This has always proved to be a gross error, I thought. You’re going to see your parents, I have often told myself, the parents of your childhood, but all I’ve ever found is a gaping void. You can’t revisit your childhood, because it no longer exists, I told myself. The Children’s Villa affords the most brutal evidence that childhood is no longer possible. You have to accept this. All you see when you look back is this gaping void. Not only your childhood, but the whole of your past, is a gaping void. This is why it’s best not to look back. You have to understand that you mustn’t look back, if only for reasons of self-protection, I thought. Whenever you look back into the past, you’re looking into a gaping void. Even yesterday is a gaping void, even the moment that’s just passed."

- This then prompts Murau to remember a reflection he made to his student Gambetti on the subject of exaggeration:

"We’re often led to exaggerate, I said later, to such an extent that we take our exaggeration to be the only logical fact, with the result that we don’t perceive the real facts at all, only the monstrous exaggeration. I’ve always found gratification in my fanatical faith in exaggeration, I told Gambetti. On occasion I transform this fanatical faith in exaggeration into an art, when it offers the only way out of my mental misery, my spiritual malaise…With some, of course, the art of exaggeration consists in understating everything, in which case we have to say that they exaggerate understatement, that exaggerated understatement is their particular version of the art of exaggeration, Gambetti. Exaggeration is the secret of great art, I said, and of great philosophy. The art of exaggeration is in fact the secret of all mental endeavor. I now left the Huntsman’s Lodge without pursuing this undoubtedly absurd idea, which would assuredly have proved correct had I developed it. On my way to the Farm, I went up to the Children’s Villa, reflecting that it was the Children’s Villa that had prompted these absurd speculations (sic)."

Book's Epigraph:

I feel death ever pinching me by the throat, or pulling me by the back. --Montaigne
