= Old Masters (disambiguation) =

Old Masters are European painters of skill who worked before about 1800. Old Masters may also refer to:

- Old Masters (novel), a 1985 Austrian novel
- Old Masters (box set), a Frank Zappa album box set series
- Gemäldegalerie Alte Meister (Old Masters Gallery), an art gallery in Dresden, Germany
- Laozi, literally "Old Master", the legendary Chinese sage to whom the Tao Te Ching is attributed
- Joe Gans, known as the "Old Master", American boxer
