= Woodcutters (novel) =

Novel by Thomas Bernhard

- 1984 German edition
- Author: Thomas Bernhard
- Original title: Holzfällen. Eine Erregung
- Language: German
- Genre: novel, monologue, Theatre-fiction
- Publisher: Suhrkamp Verlag (Germany); Alfred A. Knopf (US)
- Publication date: 1984
- Publication place: Austria
- English publication date: 1987
- Media type: Print (Hardback & Paperback)
- Pages: 181 pp
- ISBN: 978-0-394-55152-4
- OCLC: 15629615
- Dewey Decimal: 833/.914 19
- LC Class: PT2662.E7 H6513 1987

Woodcutters (German title: Holzfällen) is a novel by Thomas Bernhard, originally published in German in 1984. A roman à clef, its subject is the theatre and it forms the second part of a trilogy, between The Loser (1983) and Old Masters (1985) which deal with music and painting respectively. Its publication created an uproar in Austria, where it became a bestseller before a defamation lawsuit by the composer Gerhard Lampersberg resulted in a court order to pulp the remaining copies; Lampersberg, a former friend of Bernhard's and the model for the character Auersberger, subsequently dropped the suit.

In his Western Canon of 1994, American literary critic Harold Bloom lists Woodcutters as Bernhard’s masterpiece.

== Plot summary ==
It's 11:30 at night in an aristocratic Viennese home in the 1980s. A group of people are awaiting the arrival of a famous dramatic actor from the Burgtheater, the guest of honor, who is coming from a performance of Ibsen’s The Wild Duck. The place is that of the Auersbergers, a married couple whom the narrator hasn't seen for twenty years: she's a singer, he's a "composer in the Webern tradition".

While sitting in an arm-chair, and later at the dinner table when the actor arrives, the narrator observes the crowd around him, reliving the last two decades, his connections and ties with the various guests, and particularly his relationship with a woman, Joana, who had committed suicide and been buried earlier that day. Eventually, the actor begins an aggressive rant at one of the guests, Jeannie Billroth, a self-styled "Virginia Woolf" of Vienna and the narrator's fierce literary rival. He then becomes sad and reflective and laments that he often believes he would have been better off to have lived a rural life and to have been a woodcutter. When the actor lashes out at Billroth, the narrator momentarily turns from derogatory to sympathetic, having previously condemned the Burgtheater actor as vapid and self-centered. The novel ends as the guests disperse, with the narrator leaving the dinner and deciding to write about it.

== Epigraph ==
The epigraph of the novel is a quote from Voltaire:

Being unable to make people more reasonable, I preferred to be happy away from them.

== Translations ==
- The novel was translated into English by David McLintock as Woodcutters in 1987; and by Ewald Osers in 1988 under the title Cutting Timber: An Irritation.
- The book was translated into Georgian language as ტყის ჩეხა, by Maia Panjikidze.
- The novel was translated into Spanish language as "Tala" by Miguel Sáenz in 1988.
- The novel was translated into Polish Language as "Wycinka. Ekscytacja" by Monika Muskała in 2011.
