= Concrete (novel) =

1982 novel by Thomas Bernhard

Concrete (Beton, 1982) is a novel by the Austrian writer Thomas Bernhard.

Like many of Bernhard’s books, Concrete is written in the form of a monologue—essentially a rant lasting for 150 pages with no chapter breaks or even separate paragraphs—by Rudolf, a Viennese amateur musicologist and convalescent. Almost completely isolated from the world, Rudolf, who has sarcoidosis, has spent his adult life pursuing many writing projects on classical musicians.

A new edition of the novel, along with other out-of-print works by Bernhard, was published in 2012 on Faber & Faber's 'Faber Finds' imprint.
