= Sarah Viktoria Frick =

Swiss theatre and film actress

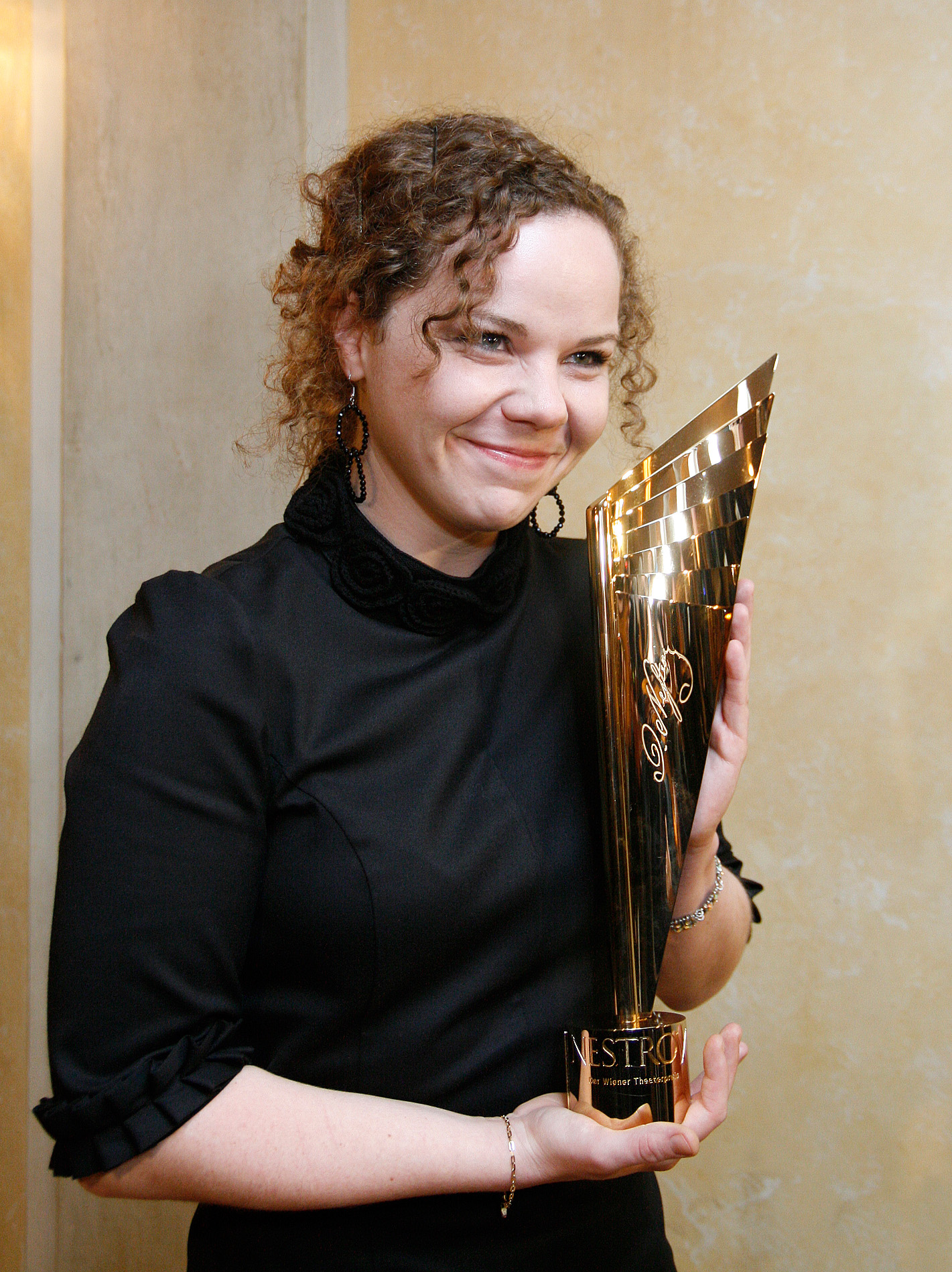
- Frick accepting the first of her Nestroy Theatre Prizes (Austria, 2010)
- Born: 28 July 1982 (age 43); Chur, Switzerland
- Occupation: Actress

Sarah Viktoria Frick (born 28 July 1982) is a Swiss theatre and film actress. She has dual nationality with Liechtenstein. She left school at 16 to study at the Academy of Music and Theatre in Zürich and has gone on to a career celebrated for her performance as Puck in Shakespeare's A Midsummer Night's Dream, among many other roles, primarily at the Burgtheater in Vienna. She has won the Nestroy Theatre Prize several times.
