= The President (play) =

1975 play by Thomas Bernhard

- Original language: German
- Written by: Thomas Bernhard
- Characters: The President; The President's Wife; Frau Frölich; Masseur; Officer; The Colonel; The Actress; The Ambassador
- Genre: Black comedy, political satire
- Setting: Acts 1 and 2: A room in the Presidential Palace; Acts 3 and 4: A resort in Estoril

Premiere
- Date: 16 May 1975
- Place: Burgtheater, Vienna
- Official website

The President (German: Der Präsident) is a play by Austrian playwright and novelist Thomas Bernhard, first performed in 1975.

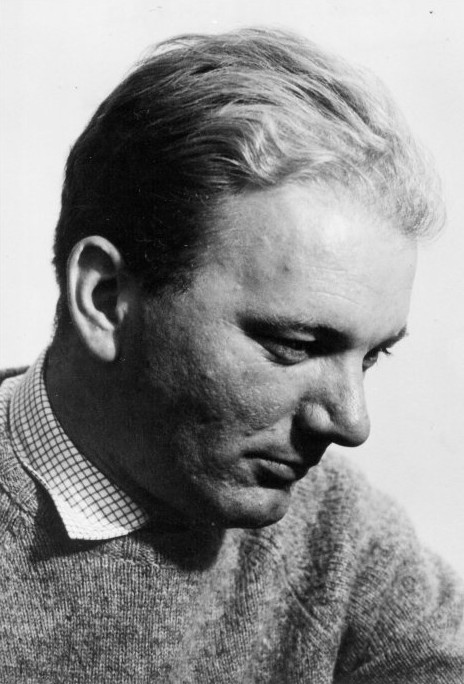
Thomas Bernhard in 1970

== Plot ==
In an unnamed Western European nation, a president and first lady recuperate in their private rooms after a failed anarchist assassination attempt that has killed the President's close ally, The Colonel, and the First Lady's beloved dog. Their son is believed to be involved with the anarchists.

Later, on a diplomatic mission in Portugal, the President entertains his mistress (The Actress). Throughout the play, the President and First Lady monologize at great length, with the other characters only making very occasional replies.

The President is assassinated offstage before the last act, which depicts his lying-in-state.

== History ==
Luis Carrero Blanco, Spanish prime minister, was assassinated in 1973.

The President took place against the background of a wave of political assassinations in Western Europe, most notably that of Luis Carrero Blanco (Prime Minister of Spain) in 1973; its premiere coincided with the Stammheim trial of leaders of the Red Army Faction (Baader–Meinhof Group).

The character of the First Lady was inspired by Bernhard's longtime friend Gerda Maleta.

The play was revived (in an English translation by Gitta Honegger) in 2024 for a Gate Theatre, Dublin–Sydney Theatre Company coproduction starring Hugo Weaving and Olwen Fouéré.
