= Gargoyles (novel) =

1967 novel by Thomas Bernhard

- First edition
- Author: Thomas Bernhard
- Original title: Verstörung
- Translator: Richard and Clara Winston
- Language: German
- Genre: Novel
- Publisher: Insel Verlag
- Publication date: 1967
- Publication place: Styria, Austria
- English publication date: 1970
- Media type: Print (Hardback & Paperback)
- Pages: 224 pp
- ISBN: 978-1-4000-7755-7
- OCLC: 76066649
- Dewey Decimal: 833/.914 22
- LC Class: PT2662.E7 V413 2006

Gargoyles is one of Thomas Bernhard’s earliest novels, which made the author known both nationally and internationally. Originally published in German in 1967, it’s a kaleidoscopic work, considered by critics his most disquieting and nihilistic. The German title, Verstörung, translates as something like Confusion or Derangement, but the American publisher chose Gargoyles, perhaps in order to render the array of human freaks the novel depicts to its very end. In fact, this is a singular, surreal study of the nature of humanity.

== Plot summary ==
One morning a doctor takes his son—an idealistic student of science and rationality—on his daily rounds through the grim mountainous Austrian countryside. They observe the rural grotesques they encounter—from an innkeeper whose wife has been murdered to a crippled musical prodigy kept in a cage—coping with physical misery, madness, and the brutality of the austere landscape. But when they meet the insomniac Prince Saurau in his castle at Hochgobernitz, his solitary, stationary mind takes over the rest of the novel in an uninterrupted obsessive paragraph. It's a hundred-page monologue by an eccentric, paranoid man, a relentlessly flowing cascade of words that is classic Bernhard: the furious logorrhea is a mesmeric rant, completing the stylistic formation of his art of exaggeration, where he uses metaphors of physical and mental illness to explore the decay of his homeland.

== Imagery, style and themes ==
Gargoyles is a dark, broken work, the first of Bernhard's novels to be translated and the first to gain him national recognition. The writing style is haunting and compulsive, the setting is the fairy-tale landscape of rural Austria, especially the area surrounding a remote mountain gorge. Then there is the Hochgobernitz castle, which seems to be taken right out of a Nosferatu movie. Its owner - the old Prince Saurau - is the expression of the best (or worst) Bernhardian values: the Habsburg stand-in who steals the show with a hundred-page monologue about his own descent into madness and his fraught relationship with his own son.

Bernhard shares with Kafka and Beckett the ability to extract more than utter gloom from his landscape of inconceivable devastation. While the external surface of life is unquestionably grim, he somehow suggests more – the mystic element in experience that calls for symbolic interpretation; the inner significance of states that are akin to surrealistic dream-worlds; humanity's yearning for health, compassion, sanity.

== Excerpts ==
- Each patient doctor and son visit suffers from a different nightmarish ailment by which the father means to expose the boy to the ubiquity of sickness, brutality, and death. "It would be wrong to refuse to face the fact," his father cautions him, "that everything is fundamentally sick and sad."
- [Prince Saurau on his decaying family] "My sisters but also my daughters always try to keep me going by fraudulent means, deceptions major and minor, but especially through one scandalous ruse: their attention. Each basically knows," he said, "that the world will collapse if I am suddenly not here anymore. If I lose interest and have myself laid out in the summer cottage. Plan to have myself laid out in the summer cottage like my father. A dead father," he said, "really instils fear. Often I think for hours on end of nothing but the mailman. The mail has got to come, I think. Mail! Mail! Mail! News!"
- Communication, family, and death are Saurau’s main interests, bound up as they are with the fate of the old ancestral castle. He is the patriarch of a moribund clan whose life and history centre on Hochgobernitz. It, like Saurau and his family, is a pathetic relic of Old Austria. Saurau lives in fear of his expatriate son who will someday return from exile to liquidate the estate of the old prince is dead. But he says towards the end: "I often think that it is my duty to write to my son in London and tell him what is awaiting him here in Hochgobernitz some day, when I am dead: cold. Isolation. Madness. Deadly monologuing." Saurau's chilling (and bitingly self-reflexive) list is the corrupt inheritance that awaits the sons of Austria's grand monarchical tradition.

Book’s Epigraph

Le silence éternel de ces espaces infinis m'effraie. --Pascal, Pensée 206
