= Correction (novel) =

1975 novel by Thomas Bernhard

- First US edition
- Author: Thomas Bernhard
- Original title: Korrektur
- Translator: Sophie Wilkins
- Language: German
- Genre: Novel
- Publisher: Alfred A. Knopf
- Publication date: 1975
- Publication place: Austria
- English publication date: 1979
- Media type: Print (Hardback & Paperback)
- Pages: 256 pp
- ISBN: 978-0-09-944254-7 (Vintage Books USA, new edition 2003)
- OCLC: 51107174

Correction is a novel by Thomas Bernhard, originally published in German in 1975, and first published in English translation in 1979 by Alfred A. Knopf.

Correction’s setting is a garret in the middle of an Austrian forest, described by the narrator as the "thought dungeon" in which the main character, Roithamer, will pursue his project of constructing an extraordinary habitation, the Cone, as a present for his beloved sister. Roithamer is deeply attached to his sister; this does not, however, prevent his provoking her death, which occurs on the very day that she moves into this conic house that he has built for her with formidable effort, in the Kobernausser forest. Roithamer has unwittingly killed his sister by forcing her to inhabit a house that was completely contrary to her own nature.

== Plot summary ==
The Austrian main character Roithamer, lecturer at Cambridge, after years of paroxysmal projects, builds for his sister, the only person he ever loved, a house in the shape of a cone, right in the geometrically precise middle of the Kobernausser forest. Her answer to the present is death, her traumatic death on entering the Cone. The symbolism of the cone is ambiguous, as it could represent either a refuge, a mausoleum, a phallic icon, the perfect mathematical centre of existence and thought, etc. The cone is then destined to disappear, absorbed by an invading Nature. A typical Bernhardian maniacal character, Roithamer corrects his building project ad infinitum, and ultimately corrects it to its extreme self-correction: suicide.

== Imagery and themes ==
The first part of the book has the narrator telling Roithamer’s story in the third person; the last part opens with the narrator still nominally telling Roithamer’s story in the third person, but gradually begins to speak directly in Roithamer’s voice, reading portions of his manuscript, where a sort of diary was kept whilst planning and building the Cone. This manuscript was in fact the focus of Roithamer's thousands of corrections, and it becomes apparent that it is being rewritten, “corrected” once again, this time through the voice of the narrator, who begins, ominously, to disappear into the language of the text. Roithamer’s story becomes increasingly obsessive and mad as it describes the construction of the Cone and the death of his sister. It concludes with the rationalisation of suicide, ending with the sentence, “The end is no process. Clearing,” and the narrator’s own voice totally dissolved into the text.

== Allusions/references to actual events ==
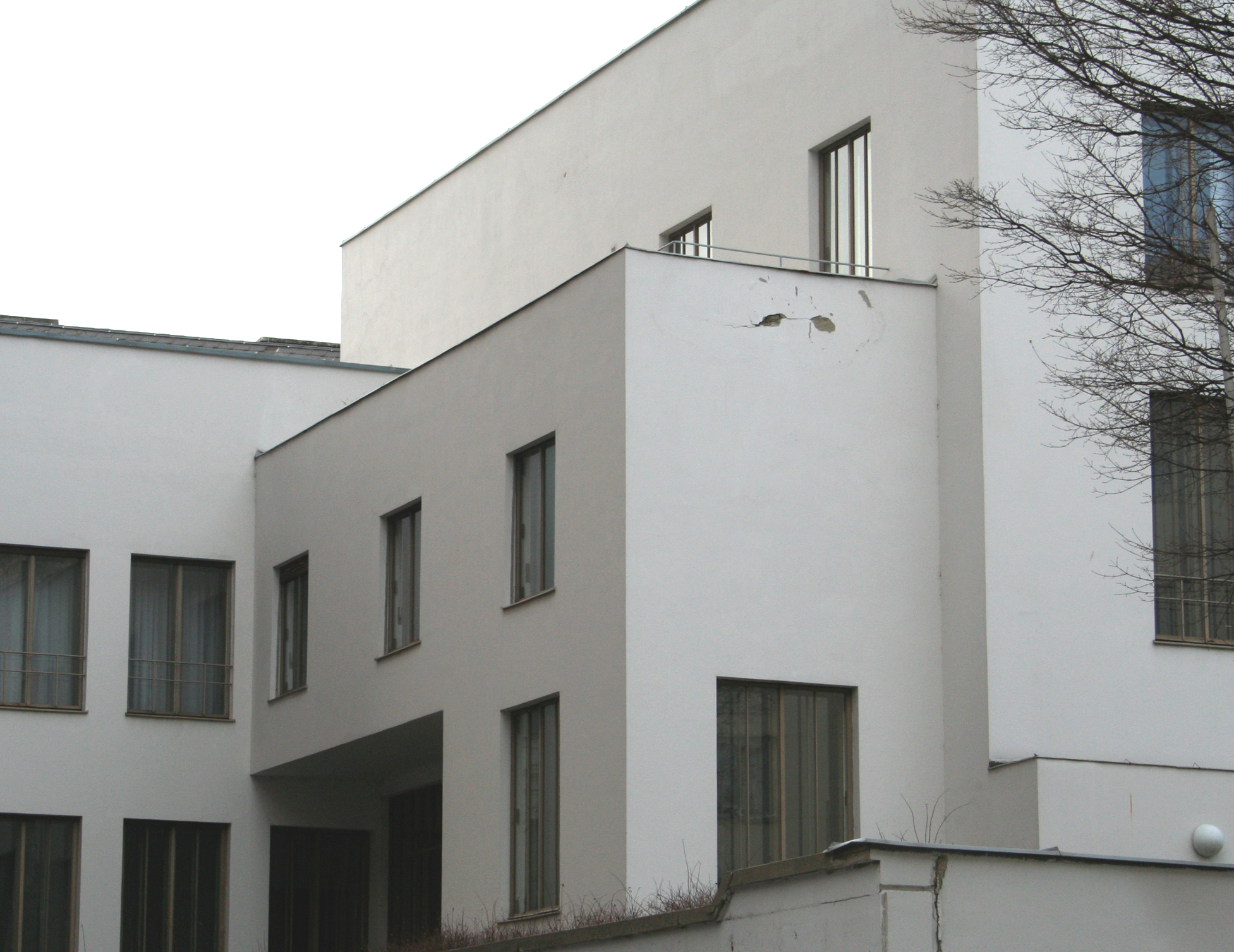
Wittgenstein's House, Vienna.

Bernhard used Ludwig Wittgenstein’s biography to intersperse aspects of Roithamer’s life with similarities and create at times a parallel narration. Wittgenstein was born into great wealth, taught at Cambridge, lived austerely, worked obsessively, and spent years carefully designing and building a house for his sister (currently the Bulgarian Cultural Institute in Vienna: Haus Wittgenstein). Other elements of Roithamer come from Bernhard’s own troubled life: his love of the Austrian countryside, his hate of the Austrian state (in his famous will, he prohibited the publication or production of any of his works in Austria), and the bitter relationship with his mother.

== Narrative style ==
Literary critics often compare Bernhard’s writing with Franz Kafka’s or Samuel Beckett's. But Bernhard’s style has its own peculiarities, a profoundly innovative form, and a much darker edge. While the characters and situations in Correction are as comical and sometimes as absurd as those in works of the above two modernists, they are also based on historical reality and a precise geography. This results in a surprising weight and closeness to the existential ground his characters tread upon. When Bernhard’s satire bends into horror as the novel progresses, there is little allegorical distance for the reader to retreat into. The culminating tragedy feels both personal and claustrophobic.
