= Am Ziel =

Am Ziel ("On Target") is a play by Austrian playwright and novelist Thomas Bernhard, written in 1981 and first performed in the same year at the Salzburger Festspiele.

== Plot ==
The play is set in the Netherlands. An elderly mother lives in a city apartment with her daughter. She is the widow of a once successful foundry owner. For several decades, the mother and the daughter have made the same journey every summer, traveling from the city to their sea-side house in Katwijk. The first act of the play describes the back story of the characters, but also reveals that, unusually, this year the pair have asked a young playwright to join them on their sea-side retreat. The second act, set in their summer house on the coast, reveals a rising tension in the relationship between the mother and the daughter, who has taken a fancy to the young intellectual.

== History ==
Am Ziel was first performed on 18 August 1981 at Salzburger Festspiele with Marianne Hoppe in the lead role, directed by Claus Peymann. The German premiere of the play took place on 22 October 1981 at Bochum, directed, again, by Peymann.

The play was first published in German in the October 1981 edition of Theater Heute.

The play was translated to English by Jan-Willem Van Den Bosch and performed by Volcano Theatre Company directed by Kathryn Hunter.

A BBC Radio 3 production was adapted by Stephen Jeffreys and starred Geraldine McEwan as the mother, Imelda Staunton as the daughter, and Julian Rhind-Tutt as the writer. It aired on June 16, 2002.
