= The Lime Works =

1973 novel by Thomas Bernhard

- First US edition
- Author: Thomas Bernhard
- Original title: Das Kalkwerk
- Translator: Sophie Wilkins
- Cover artist: Kurt A. Vargo
- Language: German
- Genre: novel
- Publisher: Alfred A. Knopf, a Borzoi Book
- Publication date: 1973
- Publication place: Austria
- Media type: Print (Hardback & Paperback)
- Pages: 241 pp
- ISBN: 978-0-394-47926-2 (and 9780226043975 University of Chicago Press Phoenix Fiction edition 1986)
- OCLC: 677316
- Dewey Decimal: 833/.9/14
- LC Class: PZ4.B5248 Li PT2662.E7

The Lime Works is a novel by Thomas Bernhard, first published in German in 1970. It is a complex surrealist work, where the creativity and resourcefulness of a destructive personality is marshalled against itself in a nightmarish narration.

== Synopsis ==
The story opens with a description of a woman’s brains scattered across the floor of an abandoned lime works, and a half-frozen man crouching on the ground nearby, covered in manure.

From this first grotesque scene, Bernhard begins his story, a compelling tale of two people insidiously bound to each other, told through a hypnotic wave of voices – the people of the small Austrian town nearby (Sicking), the officials, the salesmen, the chimney sweeps, the local gossips, the couple themselves. The man, Konrad, is consumed with his work – a book that is to be both visionary and definitive, the ultimate treatise on the subject of hearing. His wife, a cripple, is the victim of his obsessive experiments: he whispers one phrase in her ear, over and over, hundreds of times, demanding from her impossible degrees of aural discrimination. She has no way of knowing, or no strength to tell herself, whether he is a deluded madman or a genius. For three decades, he has been waiting for the ideal moment, the perfect constellation of circumstances, to arise, so that he may begin writing down his conclusions.

But he never begins, and he is now an old man. We watch as he compulsively invites his own ruin. We feel him creep from one moment to the next, terrified of failure. Suppose he started writing and then caught a cold? Suppose he finished and his tome was judged worthless? Or his wife destroyed it? Even amidst the total isolation of the lime works, where they live, he is continually distracted. He hallucinates about prowlers. He hoards bits of food for dreaded visitors. And she torments him. He must feed her, read to her, bring her cider from the deep cellar (one glass at the time), maintain her voluminous correspondence with servants he has long ago forgotten, try on a mitten she has been knitting and unravelling for years, tend the earaches she develops from constant experiments... until the monotony and heartlessness of their life together shatters in a bloodbath.

== Excerpt ==
The many voices narrating the novel appear within brackets (and Laska’s is the local tavern):

"...Konrad’s wife, whose maiden name was Zryd, a woman almost totally crippled by decades of taking the wrong medication, and who had consequently spent half her lifetime hunched over in her custom-built French invalid chair, but who is now, as Wieser puts it, out of her misery, was taught by Konrad how to use a Mannlicher carbine, a weapon the otherwise defenseless woman kept out of sight but always within reach, with the safety off, behind her chair, and it was with this gun that Konrad killed her on the night of December 24–25, with two shots in the back of her head (Fro); two shots in the temple (Wieser); abruptly (Fro) putting an end to their marital hell (Wieser). Konrad had always been quick to fire at anything within range of the house, they say at Laska’s, and as everyone knows he did shoot the woodcutter and game keeper Koller who was passing by on his way home from work one evening about four and a half years ago; quite soon after Konrad had moved in, carrying his knapsack and a hoe, and catching it in the left shoulder because Konrad mistook him for a burglar; for which shooting Konrad was in due course sentenced to nine and a half months at hard labor. The incident brought to light about fifteen previous convictions of Konrad’s, mostly for libel and aggravated assault, they say at Laska’s. Konrad served his time in the Wels district prison, where he is being held again right now..." --T. Bernhard, The Lime Works, p. 4.

Book's Epigraph

But instead of thinking about my book and how to write it, as I go pacing the floor, I fall to counting my footsteps until I feel about to go mad. --T.B.
