= On the Mountain =

1989 book by Thomas Bernhard

- First edition
- Author: Thomas Bernhard
- Original title: In der Höhe
- Translator: Russell Stockman, with Afterword by Sophie Wilkins
- Language: German
- Series: Quartet Encounters
- Genre: biography, monologue
- Publisher: Quartet Books (Namara Group)
- Publication date: 1991
- Publication place: Austria
- Media type: Print (Hardback & Paperback)
- Pages: 116 pp (143 pp with Afterword)
- ISBN: 978-0-7043-0206-8
- OCLC: 29791619

On the Mountain is Thomas Bernhard’s first prose work, which he completed in 1959, yet the last of his works to be published, in 1989, the year of his death.

Based on autobiographical elements which constitute a kind of encyclopaedic view of Bernhard's world, this book gives a rare insight into the birth of a remarkable literary oeuvre paralleling that of Kafka and of Beckett. In fact, Sophie Wilkins, in her Afterword, compares it to Kafka's short story "Description of a Struggle".

Written as one sentence, it is a monologue delivered by a court reporter who meets a variety of characters, among whom are a secondary school teacher – the only intellectual – an innkeeper, and various ladies who afford him favours or bully and humiliate him. His only true attachment is to his filthy dog. The dog is a dirty, smelly body detested by the housekeeper who wants him and his owner out, but it's precisely this indubitable physical reality of him that makes him indispensable; without it, there's no real life in his life, and therewith no ideas, no literature that means anything.

On the Mountain is a special kind of prose: relieved of its function as a carrier of common information, it presents itself as some such medium as poetry, music, painting, sculpture. The seemingly random notes of this book, its disjunct, diffuse mutterings are the vehicle for a dramatic conflict between an embattled life force intent upon self-creation, self-definition, saying "All this is only a preparation for becoming me," and its equally determined opposition, threatening to make nonsense of all that. A real sickness-unto-death is made into a fulcrum for survival in an arena which is the human condition understood as a condition of immitigable deadlock.

== Criticism ==
On its publication soon after Bernhard's death, On the Mountain was hailed as a "self-portrait of the artist as a young man" cast in the Schopenhauerian vein, and its high misanthropic tone and desolate humour do indeed anticipate all his subsequent work. Reviews described it as a "mighty prose poem," a masterly "debut and valedictory in one," an "early testament," full of pessimism and comical bleakness—Bernhard's case against intellectualised irrelevance, gripping and humane, where the nihilism of the 20th century found its most uncompromising expression.

The critical importance of this work to Bernhard's development as a writer is precisely captured by Wilkins' Afterword: "The new-fledged court reporter of On the Mountain has been writing hundreds of poems but now begins to work on his first book as it comes to him, jotting down notes, splinters of ideas, observations, encounters, characters, feelings, out of these data making a loose net in which to catch the realities of his life. In the process he discovers the power of words, infinite combinations and permutations of words such as the German language, with its many-plied nouns, is uniquely capable of. He discovers words for their own sake. He can't stop for structured paragraphs or sentences, life is literally too short (what with his lung disease being aggravated by bunglers whom he sometimes has to instruct in the procedures, any treatment could mean the end of him). His writing has become synonymous with his breathing: it is his rescue attempt, trying to save his life, even if it is nonsense to keep struggling against the inevitable, nonsense to record the nonsense of life in the face of death."

== Excerpt ==
(punctuation and linebreaks as per original)

"...frozen ponds: the dog, the damp bread,
my heart is freezing: my streets, my woods, the things I've left undone: which fling me onto my bed: my restlessness: which drives me outside and into one Gasthaus after another,
cold and restlessness are working against me and hurting me with their blows,
so that some morning it will collapse, kill me,
time has passed through me and distorted my abilities: devalued this notebook: my sorrow, as though I had said something that presupposes that I know what the soul is: without this discovery something much greater: there are only three: all of them are destroying me..." (p. 113)

~ * ~

"...the city of Salzburg has a child's face and an old man's face,
so you don't spit in it, you don't spit in the child's face and you don't spit in the old man's face,

senseless seasons, formalities, slanders: these infernal piles of documents against everything,
my dog knows I'm going to kill him, nobody else knows it: nobody's going to have my dog." (p. 116)
