= Dušan David Pařízek =

Czech theatre director

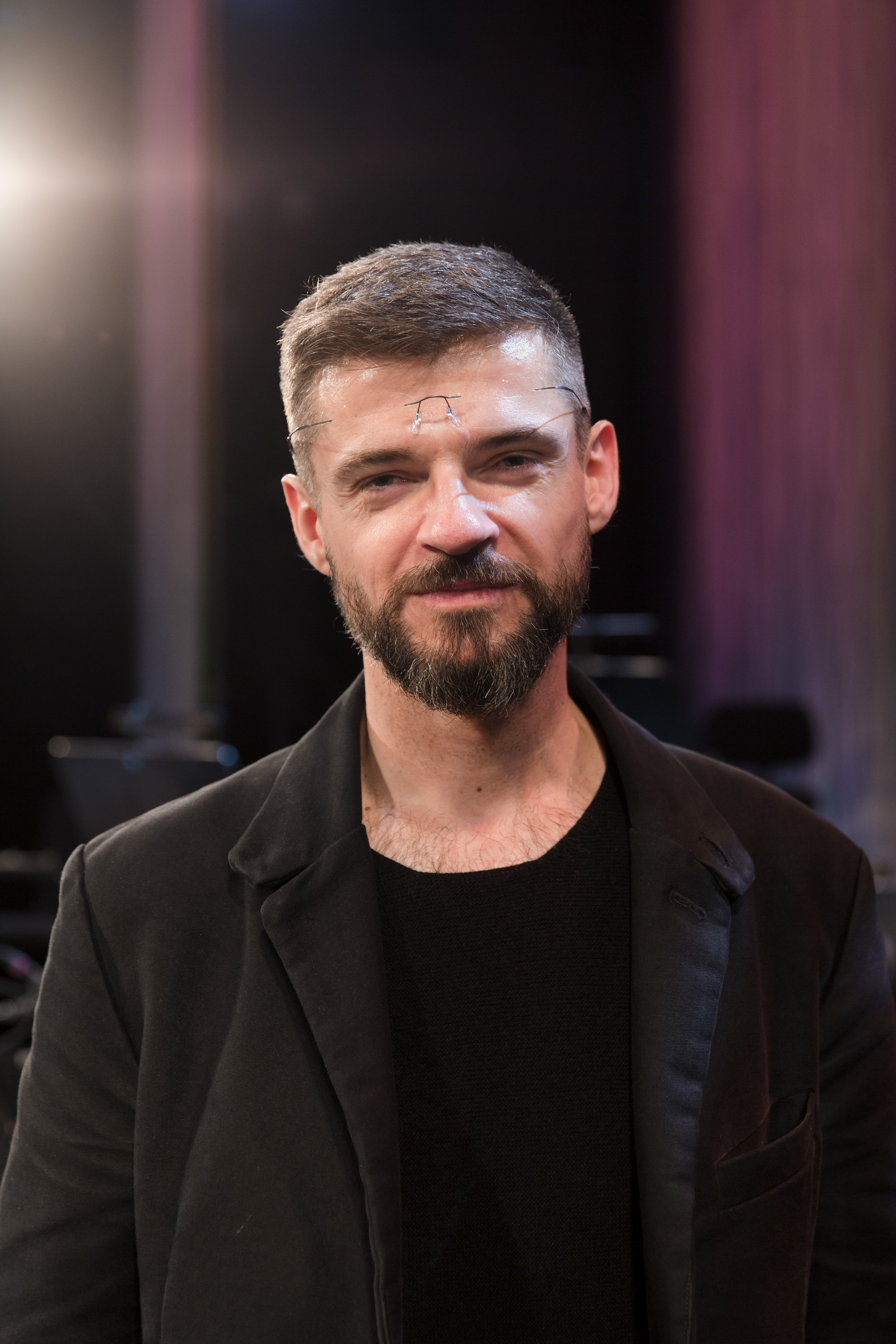
Dušan David Pařízek

Dušan David Pařízek (10 August 1971) is a Czech theatre director, mostly working in German-speaking countries.

== Background ==
Dušan Pařízek was born Brno, and his family later immigrated to Germany. He studied comparative literature and theatre science at LMU Munich and then directing and dramaturgy at the Theatre Faculty of the Academy of Performing Arts in Prague (DAMU). In 1997, he staged the play Die Präsidentinnen (The Women Presidents) by Werner Schwab and some of his additional plays in Theatre on the Balustrade.

In 1998, Dušan Pařízek was the founder and stage director of The Prague Chamber Theatre, until 2012. Pařízek's work there performed around the globe, and was selected as Czech Theatre of the Year many times.

From 2002, Dušan Pařízek worked as an executive and art director of Divadlo Komedie, with a program under the strong influence of German-speaking theatre texts. In 2012, his creative team quit because of conflicts about the finances from the municipality of Prague.

Meanwhile, Pařízek directed productions in cities including Darmstadt, Cologne, Zürich, Düsseldorf, Bremen and Vienna. In 2013, he staged a version of The Garden Party by Václav Havel at the National Theatre in Prague.

In 2018, Dušan Pařízek directed the Exil Ensemble at the Deutsches Theater, Berlin. The material was an adaptation of Franz Kafka's unfinished novel The Man Who Disappeared, transformed into the play Amerika.

== Awards ==
- In 2015, he won the Inszenierung des Jahres (Production of the Year) award from Theater heute magazine for the best German-speaking production of the year with his production of Wolfram Lotz's Die lächerliche Finsternis (The Ridiculous Darkness) in Akademietheater, Vienna.
- In 2018, he won the Nestroy Theatre Prize for best director for Vor Sonnenaufgang.
