= Frost (Bernhard novel) =

1963 novel by Thomas Bernhard

- First edition (German)
- Author: Thomas Bernhard
- Translator: Michael Hofmann
- Language: German
- Genre: Novel
- Publisher: Vintage Books USA
- Publication date: 1963
- Publication place: Austria
- English publication date: 2006
- Media type: Print (Hardback & Paperback)
- Pages: 352 pp
- ISBN: 978-1-4000-3351-5 (Reprint edition 2008)
- OCLC: 180014416

Frost is the first novel by Thomas Bernhard, originally published in German in 1963. An English translation by Michael Hofmann was published in 2006.

== Plot summary ==
The novel lacks a traditional plot and consists mostly of monologues from G. Strauch, a mad painter who isolates himself from the world by retreating to the hamlet of Weng near Schwarzach im Pongau. His surgeon brother has Strauch watched by his young medical assistant, who narrates the book and transcribes Strauch's rants. The inn where Strauch resides is managed by a woman with a husband in prison and an endless sequence of lovers. The story includes a significant amount of violence and murder.

== Narrative style ==
The character Strauch has a tendency to speak in long, ranting monologues, which characterises all of Bernhard’s subsequent work. Another element in Bernhard’s style is repetition: he often repeats phrases with minor variations. As the narrative progresses, the voice of the young narrator increasingly disappears into the voice of Strauch.
