= The Loser =

Novel by Thomas Bernhard

- First edition
- Author: Thomas Bernhard
- Original title: Der Untergeher
- Translator: Jack Dawson, with afterword by Mark M. Anderson
- Language: German
- Genre: Novel, monologue
- Publisher: Suhrkamp Verlag (Germany); Alfred A. Knopf (US)
- Publication date: 1983
- Publication place: Austria
- English publication date: 1991
- Media type: Print (Hardback & Paperback)
- Pages: 190 pp
- ISBN: 0-394-57239-4 (Vintage Books USA, new edition 2003)
- OCLC: 232720765

The Loser is a novel by Thomas Bernhard, originally published in German in 1983. The novel does not take place at the time of the events recounted, but at the time its narrator recalls them. There are three main characters: the narrator (who is the only survivor), Glenn Gould, who died a natural death at fifty-one, and Wertheimer who committed suicide some time later. The novel consists almost entirely of recollections and ruminations relating to the relationships between the three. Wertheimer and the narrator were students in a piano class taught by Vladimir Horowitz at the Mozarteum in Salzburg in 1953, where they met Gould, then a young Canadian piano prodigy.

== Plot ==
In Mozarteum in Salzburg in 1953 the main characters meet a young Canadian prodigy who plays the Goldberg Variations miraculously and who, they quickly come to realize, is a greater pianist than even their teacher—indeed, "the most important piano virtuoso of the century," as the narrator puts it in the novel's opening sentence.

The encounter with Gould affects both characters decisively for almost three decades, as they experience an endless series of personal and intellectual travails. Gould’s talent triggers the suicidal tendencies of his two colleagues: so great is the impact of Gould's genius on the other two that, even as it nourishes them, it destroys them: they realize that Gould represents an artistic ideal to which they cannot hope to aspire. So the narrator eventually decides to give up the piano in favour of philosophy, and spends much of his subsequent time composing a rambling, never-completed essay entitled "About Glenn Gould". Wertheimer, who had been a very promising virtuoso himself, follows suit, abandoning music and moving into the "human sciences", the meaning of which is left vague. Eventually, Wertheimer's behaviour becomes more and more erratic and self-destructive; he alienates all his friends, and tyrannises his devoted sister. It is Gould who, with his "ruthless and open, yet healthy American-Canadian manner" first calls Wertheimer, to his face, "The Loser" ("Der Untergeher"—a much more evocative word, lit. "the one who goes under"). As Wertheimer comes to see the accuracy of this epithet, he gradually loses his grip on life.

== Allusions to actual events ==
Bernhard and Gould never met in real life; however, Gould did play twice in Salzburg: the Bach Harpsichord Concerto in D minor, BWV 1052 with Dimitri Mitropoulos on 10 August 1958, and a Sweelinck-Schönberg-Mozart-Bach recital on 25 August 1959. Bernhard may have attended one of the performances, although there is no evidence that he did.

== Narrative style ==
The novel is written in the form of a continuous first person interior monologue, with no paragraph indentations and a high number of run-on sentences, obsessive repetitions, unexplained uses of italics, and alienating leaps (without transition) from verb tense to verb tense.

== Adaptations ==
The Brooklyn Academy of Music commissioned a one-act chamber opera by David Lang based on the novel, which had its premiere in September 2016.
