= Wolfsegg am Hausruck =

- Municipality
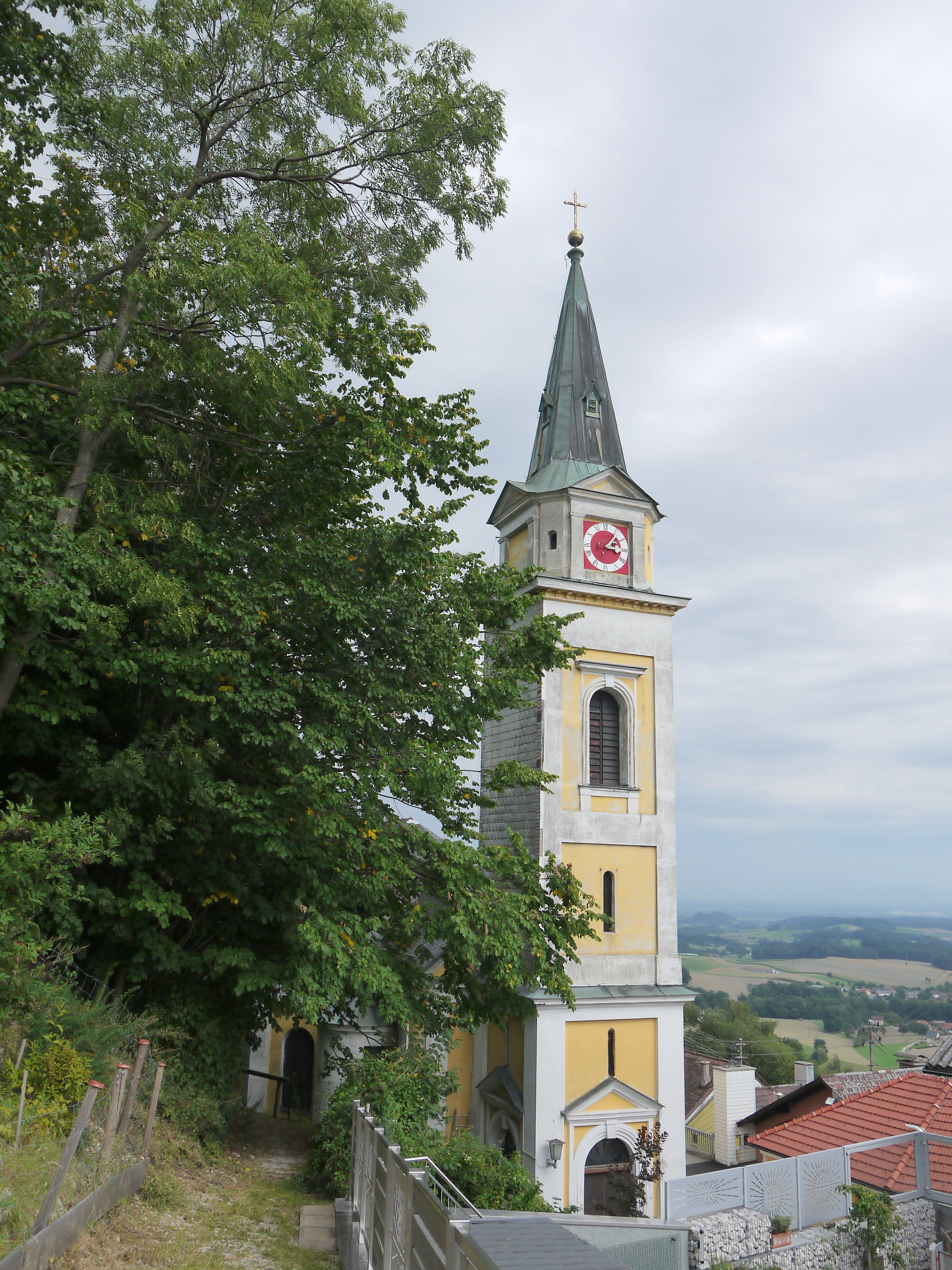

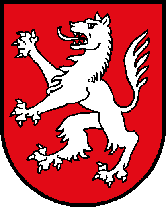
- Coat of arms

- Location within Austria
- Coordinates: 48°06′27″N 13°40′28″E
- Country: Austria
- State: Upper Austria
- District: Vöcklabruck

Government
  - Mayor: Barbara Schwarz (ÖVP)

Area
  - Total: 11.99 km^{2} (4.63 sq mi)
- Elevation: 638 m (2,093 ft)

Population (2018-01-01)
  - Total: 1,982
  - Density: 165.3/km^{2} (428.1/sq mi)
- Time zone: UTC+1 (CET)
  - Summer (DST): UTC+2 (CEST)
- Postal code: 4902
- Area code: 07676
- Vehicle registration: VB
- Website: www.wolfsegg.ooe.gv.at

Wolfsegg am Hausruck (Central Bavarian: Woifsegg ban Hausruck) is a municipality in the district of Vöcklabruck in the Austrian state of Upper Austria.

== Population ==
Historical population
Year	Pop.	±%
1991	1,999	—
2001	1,983	−0.8%
2016	2,025	+2.1%
