= Yes (novel) =

Novel by Thomas Bernhard

- First UK edition (1991)
- Author: Thomas Bernhard
- Original title: Ja
- Translator: Ewald Osers
- Language: German
- Series: Phoenix Fiction
- Genre: Novel, Monologue
- Publisher: Quartet Books (UK); University of Chicago Press (US)
- Publication date: 1978
- Publication place: Upper Austria
- English publication date: April 1991 (UK); November 1993 (US)
- Media type: Print (Hardback & Paperback)
- Pages: 140 pp
- ISBN: 978-0-226-04390-6 (and 9780140186826 Quartet edition 1991)
- OCLC: 26012744
- Dewey Decimal: 833/.914 20
- LC Class: PT2662.E7 J213 1992

Yes is a novel by Thomas Bernhard, originally published in German in 1978 and translated into English by Ewald Osers in 1992.

== Plot summary ==
Characters:

1. The narrator, a scientist
2. Moritz, an estate agent, and his family
3. A Swiss engineer
4. His wife, a Persian born in Shiraz

This novel is about suicide, a topic that permeates overtly or covertly all of Bernhard’s work. A Persian woman is the central character of narration, and the narrator prepares for her suicide by his own preoccupation with suicide. This motif of the surrogate victim is clearly established in the novel's opening sentence ^{(see excerpt below)}, where the narrator describes himself as in the process of "dumping" his problems on his friend Moritz. Later, he will persist in making these revelations even though he recognizes that they have "wounded" Moritz. Similarly, he will underline the Persian woman's role as a surrogate victim when he refers to her as the ideal "sacrificial mechanism".

One could easily perceive that the woman fascinates the narrator, who finds in her a suitable companion in his solitary walks into the nearby forest, where he obsesses her with interminable disquisitions and philosophical rants. She is "an utterly regenerating person, that is an utterly regenerating walking and thinking and talking and philosophising partner such as I had not had for years".

Gradually the narrator goes back in time and recollects his first meetings with the Persian woman, uncovering a universe of loneliness where the only existential act left is confession. However, self-exposure not always engenders a benefit. Whilst the narrator undergoes a positive reaction, becoming once again attached to life and thus discarding suicide, the Persian woman is unable to unravel the knots of her painful social isolation and says a definitive "yes" to annihilation.

Literally, the woman arrived in this comically benighted corner of Upper Austria because her companion, a Swiss engineer, had chosen it as the ideal location in which to build his new house, right in the middle of a nearby thick forest. But the reader recognizes this realistic motivation as simply a pretext for arranging the sacrificial death that Bernhard intends for her. We glimpse this archetypal pattern from the very beginning of his narrative, when the narrator describes the woman as "regenerating" and perceives the arrival of the couple as signifying his "redemption". While the narrator himself has never been able to act on his own suicidal impulses, it was his insinuating words, as we learn in the novel's closing sentence, that provoked the woman's suicide. After she has committed suicide (by throwing herself in front of a cement truck), he remembers discussing the frequent suicide of young people and asking her if she would kill herself one day, to which she replies, in the novel's closing word, "Yes".

== Excerpt ==
^ Incipit:

"The Swiss and his woman friend had appeared at the real-estate agent Moritz’s place at just the moment when, for the first time, I was trying not only to outline to him the symptoms of my emotional and mental sickness and eventually elucidate them as a science, but had come to Moritz’s house, who in point of fact was then probably the person closest to me, in order quite suddenly and in the most ruthless manner to turn the inside of my, by then not just sickly but totally sickness-ridden, existence, which until then he had known just superficially and had not therefore been unduly irritated let alone alarmed by in any way, turn that inside of my existence out, and thus inevitably alarmed and appalled him by the very abrupt brutality of my undertaking, by the fact that, on that afternoon, I totally unveiled and revealed what, over the whole decade of my acquaintance and friendship with Moritz, I had kept hidden from him, indeed concealed from him throughout that period with mathematical ingeniousness, and kept continually (and pitilessly towards myself) covered from him, in order not to grant him, Moritz, even the slightest glimpse into my existence, which profoundly horrified him, but I had not allowed that horror to impede me in the least in my revealing mechanism which had, that afternoon and of course also under the influence of the weather, gone into action, and step by step, that afternoon, I had, as though I had no other choice, all of a sudden pounced upon Moritz from my mental ambush, unveiling everything relating to myself, unveiling everything that there was to unveil, revealing everything there was to reveal; throughout the incident I had been seated, as always, in the corner seat facing the two windows by the entrance to Moritz’s office, to what I always called his box-file room, while Moritz himself, after all this was the end of October, sat facing me in his mouse-grey winter overcoat, possibly by then in a drunk state, which in the falling dusk I had been unable to determine..."

This opening sentence of Yes continues on and is an uninterrupted 477 words long.
