= Thomas Bernhard =

Austrian novelist and playwright (1931–1989)

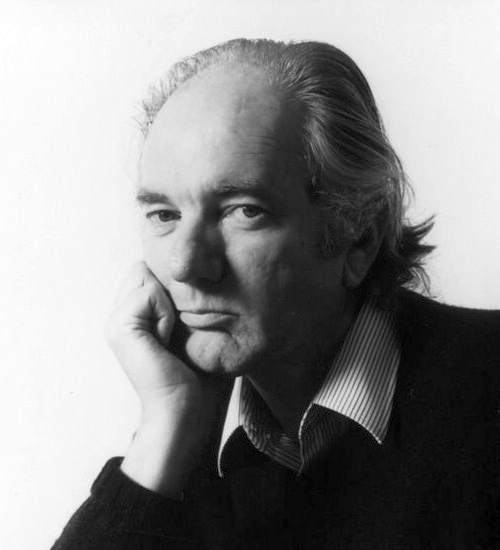
- Bernhard in 1987
- Born: Nicolaas Thomas Bernhard; 9 February 1931; Heerlen, Netherlands
- Died: 12 February 1989 (aged 58); Gmunden, Austria
- Citizenship: Austria
- Occupations: Novelist, playwright
- Writing career
- Period: 1957–1989
- Notable works: Frost (1963); Correction (1975); Gathering Evidence (1975–82); Woodcutters (1984); Extinction (1986)
- Movement: Postmodernism
- Website: thomasbernhard.at

Nicolaas Thomas Bernhard (German: [ˈtoːmas ˈbɛʁnhaʁt]; 9 February 1931 – 12 February 1989) was an Austrian novelist, playwright, poet and polemicist who is considered one of the most important German-language authors of the postwar era. He explored themes of death, isolation, obsession and illness in controversial literature that was pessimistic about the human condition and highly critical of post-war Austrian and European culture. He developed a distinctive prose style often featuring multiple perspectives on characters and events, idiosyncratic vocabulary and punctuation, and long monologues by protagonists on the verge of insanity.

Born in the Netherlands to his unwed Austrian mother, for much of his childhood he lived with his maternal grandparents in Austria and in boarding homes in Austria and Nazi Germany. He was closest to his grandfather, the novelist Johannes Freumbichler, who introduced him to literature and philosophy. As a youth, he contracted pleurisy and tuberculosis and lived with debilitating lung disease for the rest of his life. While recovering in a sanatorium he began writing poetry and stories and met Hedwig Stavianicek, a wealthy heiress who supported his literary ambitions and whom he later described as the most important person in his life.

After his breakthrough novel Frost (1963), he established himself over the next 20 years as a leading novelist and playwright in German. His major works include the novels Correction (1975) and Extinction (1986) and his memoirs Gathering Evidence (1975–82). George Steiner called him "at his best, the foremost craftsman of German prose after Kafka and Musil". He influenced the Austrian vernacular and a younger generation of Austrian writers including Elfriede Jelinek.

Bernhard was controversial in Austria for his public polemics against what he saw as his homeland's post-war cultural pretensions, antisemitism, provincialism, and denial of its Nazi past. While critics labelled him a Nestbeschmutzer (one who fouls his own nest), he described himself as a troublemaker. He died of heart failure in his apartment in Gmunden, Upper Austria, in February 1989. Controversy extended beyond his death when it was revealed that his will sought to prohibit the publication or performance of his works in Austria for 70 years.

== Life and work ==
=== Early life (1931–1950) ===
Thomas Bernhard was born on 9 February 1931 in Heerlen, the Netherlands, where his unmarried Austrian mother, Herta Bernhard, worked as a maid. In the autumn of 1931, Herta took Thomas to Vienna to live with her parents: Anna Bernhard and her de facto husband, the novelist Johannes Freumbichler. (Thomas never met his biological father, Alois Zuckerstätter, who refused to acknowledge him and committed suicide in 1940.)

In 1935, Herta's parents moved with Thomas to Seekirchen, near Salzburg. In 1936, Herta married Emil Fabjan and the following year moved with him and Thomas to Traunstein, Bavaria, in Nazi Germany. Fabjan never adopted Thomas, and Bernhard always referred to him as his guardian rather than his stepfather. Herta's parents moved to the nearby village of Ettendorf in 1939. Bernhard was closest to his grandfather and later called him "an anarchist, if only in spirit." Freumbichler introduced Bernhard to literature and philosophy and was a major influence on his life.

Bernhard was miserable in the Nazi school system where he was required to join the Deutsches Jungvolk, a branch of the Hitler Youth, which he hated. At age eight, he was sent to a home for maladjusted children and at age 12 to a boarding school in Salzburg where he experienced allied bombing raids. After the war, the Fabjan and Freumbichler families moved to Salzburg where Bernhard continued his schooling. In 1947, Bernhard left school to start an apprenticeship with a grocer.

Bernhard took private singing lessons and aspired to become an opera singer. In early 1949, he developed pleurisy and was eventually diagnosed with tuberculosis. He stayed in various hospitals and sanatoriums until January 1951. Bernhard's grandfather died in 1949 and his mother died of cancer the following year.

In 1950, while staying at the Grafenhof sanatorium in Sankt Veit im Pongau, Bernhard met Hedwig Stavianicek (1894–1984), a wealthy heiress who was more than thirty-seven years his senior. Stavianicek was to provide him with financial and emotional support and introductions to patrons of art and culture. Bernhard later called her his Lebensmensch (a predominantly Austrian term coined by Bernhard which refers to the most important person in one's life). He cared for her in her home in Vienna in the last months of her life in 1984.

=== Literary apprenticeship (1951–1963) ===
From 1951 to 1955, Bernhard worked as a court reporter and cultural journalist for the Salzburg newspaper Demokratisches Volksblatt. He continued his private singing lessons and had poems and short stories published in the Volksblatt and other publications. In late 1955, he published a scathing critique of the Salzburger Landestheater and the ensuing controversy ended his journalistic career. From autumn 1955 to 1957, with the financial support of Stavianicek, he studied acting and singing at the Salzburg Mozarteum. There he met a music student Ingrid Bülau. They became lifelong friends and at one point considered marriage.

From 1956 to 1960, Bernhard was associated with the literary and cultural groups centred on the magazine Stimmen der Gegenwart (Voices of the Present) and the composer Gerhard Lampersberg and his wife, the singer Maja Lampersberg. At this time, Bernhard's first volumes of poetry were published: Auf der Erde und in der Hölle (On Earth and in Hell, 1957), In hora mortis (At the hour of death, 1958), and Unter dem Eisen des Mondes (Under the Steely Moon, 1958). His libretto for Gerhard Lampersberg's Die Rosen der Einöde (Roses of the Wasteland) was also published in 1958.

From 1960 to 1963 Bernhard travelled extensively in Austria, England and mainland Europe. In 1962, he wrote a novel Frost, which was revised and published in 1963.

=== Established author (1963–1978) ===
Bernhard's poetry received little critical attention but Frost sparked controversy and divided critical opinion. Novelist Carl Zuckmayer praised the novel and it won the Julius Campe Prize and the Bremen Literature Prize. Bernhard's novella Amras was published in 1964 and, according to biographer Gitta Honegger, consolidated his favourable critical reputation. In 1965, Bernhard bought a disused farmhouse in Obernathal, Upper Austria. For the rest of his life he divided most of his time between his farmhouse and Stavianicek's apartment in Vienna.

In 1967, after completing his second novel Gargoyles, Bernhard had surgery to remove a tumour from his lungs and spent several months recovering in the Baumgartnerhöhe sanatorium. The following year he was awarded the Austrian Little State Prize for emerging talent. His acceptance speech, in which he stated: ''We are Austrians, we are apathetic; we are life as crass disinterest in life; in the process of nature we are megalomania..." caused an uproar and an angry response from the Austrian minister for culture. The following year, the ceremony for the Anton Wildgans Prize was cancelled when the organisers learned that Bernhard intended to deliver a revised version of the same speech.

In 1970, Bernhard's novel The Lime Works was published and his first professionally produced play, A Party for Boris, premiered at the Deutsches Schauspielhaus, Hamburg. The production was overseen by German director Claus Peymann who went on to direct most of Bernhard's premieres. The Lime Works and A Party for Boris earned Bernhard the Georg Büchner Prize. When Bernhard was awarded the Grillparzer Prize for the same play in 1972, he staged a protest because the organisers of the ceremony did not recognise him and escort him to his seat.

The 1970s was Bernhard's most productive decade. His plays The Ignoramus and the Madman (1972) and The Force of Habit: A Comedy (1974) premiered at the Salzburg Festival, The Hunting Party (1974) and The President (1975) premiered at the Vienna Burgtheater, and Minetti (1976), Immanuel Kant (1978) and The Eve of Retirement (1979) premiered at the Stuttgart Staatstheater under Peymann. His novel Correction (1975) is widely considered his masterpiece and his five volumes of memoirs (1975–82) (collected in English translation as Gathering Evidence) achieved critical acclaim.

=== Final years and late work (1978–89) ===
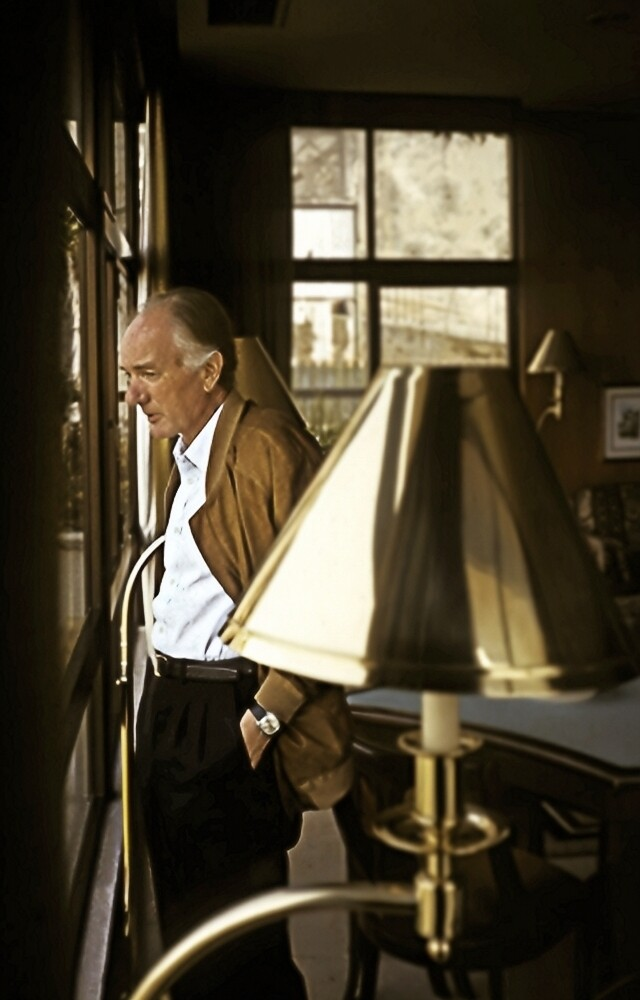
Bernhard in 1987

In 1978, Bernhard was diagnosed with sarcoidosis and a terminal heart complaint. His half-brother Peter Fabjan, a doctor of medicine, moved to Gmunden, near the author's farmhouse, and became his unofficial medical adviser. In 1979, Bernhard resigned from the German Academy for Language and Literature when it made the former West German president Walter Scheel an honorary member. In a letter to the Frankfurter Allgemeine Zeitung he called the academy pretentious and hypocritical for admitting mediocre politicians.

Bernhard continued his prolific output in the 1980s. Eight new full-length plays were premiered and he wrote a series of novels comprising long monologues by ageing and ill protagonists who Honegger compares to Bernhard in their "race against death." His 1984 novel Woodcutters was controversial for its attack on Austrian culture and cultural figures. Gerhard Lampersberg sued him for defamation but later withdrew his suit. The novel was Bernhard's most commercially successful, selling 60,000 copies within six weeks of publication.

Bernhard frequently engaged in public controversies, writing letters, opinion pieces and satirical sketches for newspapers and magazines in which he attacked politicians, public figures and European culture. He was often criticised as a Nestbeschmutzer (one who fouls his own nest; that is, Austria) but preferred to call himself a troublemaker. His final play Heldenplatz (1988), commissioned by Vienna's Burgtheater for the celebrations of its centenary, sparked another controversy when the press revealed that it would include attacks on Austria for antisemitism and denial of its Nazi past. Numerous politicians and public figures called for a ban on the production, Bernhard received death threats, and the Burgtheater was guarded by 200 police officers on the opening night of the play in November 1988.

Following the Heldenplatz dispute, Bernhard's health deteriorated. He died of heart failure in his apartment in Gmunden on 12 February 1989. His reputation as a troublemaker continued beyond the grave when a clause of his will was published, stipulating that none of his works or plays could be performed in Austria for the duration of copyright:

I emphasize expressly that I do not want to have anything to do with the Austrian state and that I reject in perpetuity not only all interference but any overtures in this regard by this Austrian state concerning my person or my work. After my death, not a word shall be published from my papers, wherever such may exist, including letters and scraps of paper.

— Thomas Bernhard, Last will and testament

== Themes and style ==
=== Themes ===
Most of Bernhard's work has autobiographical elements, although fact and fiction are freely mixed. According to Honegger: "Bernhard's life and work are inextricably intertwined with Austria's convulsive history in the twentieth century."

Bernhard's work presents a pessimistic view of the human condition in which death is an inescapable presence. Critic Mark Anderson states, "death in his writing comes as a random, unjustifiable, but unavoidable cut in existence that cancels all previous hope and striving". Literary critic Stephen Dowden states that in Berhard's fiction there is no redemption for man in religion, politics, art or history.

The typical Bernhard protagonist is a middle-aged male who, according to Dowden, is "self-absorbed, histrionically pessimistic, and motivated by a deep loathing of culture and self," but who is nevertheless "strangely charismatic because of the powerful musical language with which he expresses his inner life." His protagonists must "learn to live without recourse to metaphysical lies or utopian deceptions."

Bernhard depicts a postwar Austria steeped in cultural pretensions, antisemitism, denial of its Nazi past and devotion to a morally bankrupt Catholicism. Dowden argues that Austria is often used as a metaphor for the human condition. Just as Austrian history is a story of decline into insignificance, so human beings struggle pointlessly against death; just as Austria engages in self-deception regarding its past and its place in the world, so human beings engage in self-deceptions about the redemptive power of religion, family and culture.

Recurring motifs in Bernhard's work include isolation, incest, madness, chronic illness and suicide. Many of Bernhard's characters suffer from mental and physical illness which Dowden sees as metaphors for Bernhard's moral pessimism and the decline of European society and culture. His protagonists are often engaged in failed intellectual and artistic projects in a futile and destructive attempt to achieve perfection and thus transcend death.

In the face of inevitable death, Bernhard's characters often demonstrate a will to survive. Honegger states, "The Überlebenskünstler is Bernhard's central archetype: the survival artist as a virtuoso performance artist." Dowden argues that Bernhard's works also attest to a will to rebel against conformity and to develop an independent self-identity: "His entire oeuvre amounts to one unswerving experiment in thinking against the grain, in forcing the imagination to explore the parts of life it resists the most."

=== Style ===
Bernhard developed a distinctive prose style which is often described as musical, emphasising the rhythms of Austrian German, repetition of key phrases, and variations on recognisable themes. Anderson states that his prose works "all spring, or appear to spring, from the obsessive monologue going on inside Bernhard's head, a continuous text uttered by a single droning voice that is endlessly reformulated, corrected, and filtered through a hundred different registers." Honegger distinguishes between Bernhard's early prose which was characterised by multiple perspectives and stylistic experimentation and the late works beginning with Yes (1978) which she calls "concerts for a solo mind."

Bernhard's works are known for their distinctive punctuation and vocabulary. Many comprise a stream of long sentences, unbroken by any paragraph or chapter markings. Honegger states: "His verbal inventions have entered the German vocabulary. His constructions of interminably interlocked clauses and sub-clauses stretch the German language to its limit."

The tone of Bernhard's work is often described as satirical, ironic, polemical and unsentimental. Dowden argues that the extreme and often contradictory views of his protagonists invite the reader to detect ironies and read them as satires. Readers are not expected to accept or reject the opinions of Bernhard's protagonists but to engage with their "verbal struggle against death".

Bernhard's pessimism is often undercut by comedy and black humour. According to Anderson: "The death narrative is always also the record of survival, a survival through a grotesquely jubilant, at times comic writing." Dowden states that "comedy arises when people attempt to create meaning or convince themselves that the world holds something for them....[It is] an austere comedy of catastrophe, despair and mockery."

== Reception and legacy ==
Bernhard is widely considered one of the most important German-language writers of the second half of the 20th century. Critics generally consider his major prose works to be Correction (1975), Extinction (1986) and his five volumes of memoirs (1975–82) (collected in English translation as Gathering Evidence.)

Bernhard wrote 18 full-length plays, many of which premiered at leading German-language venues including the Deutsches Schauspielhaus in Hamburg, the Salzburg Festival and the Vienna Burgtheater. His plays polarised audiences and critics and often caused media and political controversy for their pessimism and polemics against Austrian and European culture and institutions. According to Dowden: "His public was eager to see what powerful figure he would insult next, what enraged outcry he would elicit, who would try to sue him, and how he would respond."

Honegger states that Bernhard's prose style has influenced the German language: "his performative grammar and incendiary vocabulary have been appropriated by politicians of all persuasions, exploited by the media, and imitated by lesser writers." Bernhard has influenced younger Austrian writers including Elfriede Jelinek, Lilian Faschinger, Robert Menasse and Josef Haslinger. Since 2022, the research project GlobalBernhard at the University of Vienna has been investigating the various forms of literary resonance and commentary that Thomas Bernhard's work has triggered among international authors.

In 1999, Bernhard's literary executor, his half-brother Peter Fabjan, lifted the ban on the performance of his plays in Austria. Although Bernhard stipulated in his will that none of his unpublished writings should be published, this has sometimes been circumvented. Notably, a memoir My Prizes appeared in 2009 and his correspondence with his publisher Siegfried Unseld from 1961 to 1989 – about 500 letters – was published in December 2009. Bernhard's collected works were published in 22 volumes from 2003 to 2015.

The International Thomas Bernhard Society (Internationale Thomas Bernhard Gesellschaft (ITBG)) was founded in 1999. In a collaborative project between the ITGB, the Austrian Academy of Sciences, and the German publishing house Suhrkamp, the Thomas Bernhard Research Center at the Austrian Center for Digital Humanities created thomas bernhard in translation, the "first online database of all published translations of Thomas Bernhard's works." As of July 2025, it comprised over 1,000 entries in 42 languages.

== Awards ==
Bernhard received numerous awards in recognition of his work. These include:

- Julius Campe Prize (1964) (Awarded for Frost)
- Bremen Literature Prize (1965) (Awarded for Frost)
- Literature Prize of the Federal Association of German Industry (1967)
- Förderungspreis für Literatur (Austrian Little State Prize for Literature) (1968)
- Anton Wildgans Prize (1969) (Awarded by the Austrian Association of Industrialists)
- Georg Büchner Prize (1970) (Awarded by the German Academy for Language and Literature for A Party for Boris and The Lime Works)
- Franz Theordor Csokor Prize (1972)
- Adolf Grimme Prize (1972)
- Grillparzer Prize (1972) (Awarded by the Austrian Academy of Sciences for the play A Party for Boris)
- Hannover Dramatists Prize (1974)
- Prix Séguier (1974)
- Literature Prize of the Austrian Federal Chamber of Commerce (1976) (Awarded for Der Keller [The Cellar])
- Mondello Prize (Premio letterario internazionale Mondello Città di Palermo) (1983)
- Prix Médicis étranger (1988)

== Bibliography ==
This partial bibliography lists works by Bernhard by the date of their first publication in separate volumes in commercial editions. Plays are listed by the date of first publication or performance. English translations are listed by date of publication. Unless otherwise stated, the sources are Honegger, Dowden, the International Thomas Bernhard Society, the Thomas Bernhard in Translation database, and the individual works listed.

=== Novels ===
- Frost (1963). Translated by Michael Hofmann (2006)
- Verstörung (1967). Gargoyles, translated by Richard and Clara Winston (1970)
- Das Kalkwerk (1970). The Lime Works, translated by Sophie Wilkins (1973)
- Korrektur (1975). Correction, translated by Sophie Wilkins (1979)
- Ja (1978). Yes, translated by Ewald Osers (1991)
- Die Billigesser (1980). The Cheap-Eaters, translated by Ewald Osers (1990) and Douglas Robertson (2021)
- Beton (1982), Concrete, translated by David McLintock (1984).
- Wittgensteins Neffe. Eine Freundschaft (1982). Wittgenstein's Nephew, translated by Ewald Osers (1986) and David McLintock (1989)
- Der Untergeher (1983). The Loser, translated by Jack Dawson (1991)
- Holzfällen. Eine Erregung (1984). Translated by David McLintock as Woodcutters (1987) and Ewald Osers as Cutting Timber: An Irritation (1988)
- Alte Meister. Komödie (1985). Old Masters: A Comedy, translated by Ewald Osers (1989)
- Auslöschung. Ein Zerfall (1986). Extinction, translated by David McLintock (1995)
- In der Höhe. Rettungsversuch, Unsinn (written 1959, published 1989). On the Mountain, translated by Russell Stockman (1991)

=== Novellas and short story collections ===
- Amras (1964). Translated by Peter Jansen (2003)
- Prosa (1967). Prose, translated by Martin Chalmers (Seagull Books, 2010). Includes: "Two Tutors"; "The Cap"; "Is It a Comedy? Is It a Tragedy?" "Jauregg"; "Attaché at the French Embassy"; "The Crime of an Innsbruck Shopkeeper's Son"; "The Carpenter"
- Ungenach: Erzählung (1968). "Ungenach", translated by Douglas Robertson (2022)
- An der Baumgrenze (1969). Includes: "An der Baumgrenze" (At the Timberline), "Der Kulturer" (Kulterer), and "Der Italiener" (The Italian)
  - "At the Timberline", translated by Sophie Wilkins (1981); translated by Douglas Robertson (2022)
  - "The Italian", translated by Eric Williams (1991)
- Ereignisse (Events) (1969)
- Watten. Ein Nachlaß (1969). Playing Watten, translated by Kenneth L. Northcott (2003)
- Midland in Stilfs (1971). Includes three stories: "Midland in Stilfs", "Der Wetterfleck" (The Weatherproof Cape), and "Am Ortler" (At the Ortler)
- Gehen (1971). Walking, translated by Kenneth L. Northcott (2003)
- Der Wetterfleck: Erzählungen (1976). Includes "Der Wetterfleck" (The Weatherproof Cape), "Jauregg", and "Der Zimmerer" (The Carpenter)
- Der Stimmenimitator (1978). Translated by Craig Kinosian as The Voice Impersonator (1995) and by Kenneth Northcott as The Voice Imitator: 104 Stories (1997)
- Goethe schtirbt (2010). Goethe Dies, translated by James Reidel (Seagull Books, 2016). Includes four stories from the early 1980s

=== Plays ===
- Ein Fest für Boris (1968). A Party for Boris, translated by Peter Jansen and Thomas Northcott (1990)
- Der Ignorant und der Wahnsinnige (1972). The Ignoramus and the Madman, translated by Douglas Robertson (2023)
- Die Jagdgesellschaft (1974). The Hunting Party, translated by Gita Honegger (1980)
- Die Macht der Gewohnheit. Komödie (1974). The Force of Habit: A Comedy, translated by Neville and Stephen Plaice (1976)
- Der Präsident (1975). The President, translated by Gitta Honegger (1982)
- Die Berühmten (1976). The Celebrities, translated by Douglas Robertson (2023)
- Minetti. Ein Portrait des Künstlers als alter Mann (1977). Minetti, translated by Gita Honegger (2000); Tom Cairns and Peter Eyre (2014)
- Immanuel Kant (1978). Translated by Douglas Robertson (2023)
- Der Weltverbesserer (1979). The World-Fixer, translated by Josef Glowa, Donald McManus and Susan Hurly-Glowa (2005)
- Vor dem Ruhestand. Eine Komödie von deutscher Seele (1979). Eve of Retirement, translated by Gitta Honegger (1982)
- Über allen Gipfeln ist Ruh (1981). Over All the Mountain Tops, translated by Michael Mitchell (2004)
- Am Ziel (1981). Translated by Douglas Robertson as The Goal Attained in Save Yourself If You Can (2023)
- Der deutsche Mittagstisch (1981). The German Lunch Table, translated by Gita Honegger (1981)
- Der Schein trügt (1983). Appearances Are Deceiving, translated by Gita Honegger (1983)
- Der Theatermacher (1984). Histrionics, translated by Peter Jansen and Thomas Northcott (1990)
- Ritter, Dene, Voss (1984). Translated by Peter Jansen and Thomas Northcott (1990)
- Einfach kompliziert (1986). Simply Complicated, translated by Douglas Robertson (2023)
- Elisabeth II (1987). Elizabeth II, translated by Douglas Robertson (2023)
- Heldenplatz (1988). Translated by Gita Honegger (1999) as well as Andrea Tierney and Meredith Oakes (2010)
- Claus Peymann kauft sich eine Hose und geht mit mir essen. Drei Dramolette (1990)
  - First dramolette: Claus Peymann Leaves Bochum and Goes to Vienna as Artistic Director of the Burgtheater
  - Second dramolette: Claus Peymann Buys Himself a Pair of Pants and Joins Me for Lunch, translated by Damion Searls (2008)
  - Third dramolette: Claus Peymann and Hermann Beil on Sulzwiese, translated by Gita Honneger (1998)

=== Poetry volumes ===
- Auf der Erde und in der Hölle (1957). On Earth and in Hell: Early Poems, translated by Peter Waugh (Three Rooms Press, 2015).
- In hora mortis (1958). In Hora Mortis, translated by James Reidel (2006)
- Unter dem Eisen des Mondes (1958). Under the Iron of the Moon, translated by James Reidel (2006)
- Ave Vergil (written 1959–60; published 1981). Ave Virgil, translated by James Reidel (2009)
- Die Irren. Die Häftlinge (written 1962; published 1988). The Lunatics / The Inmates, translated by James Reidel (2001)

=== Autobiography ===
- Die Ursache (1975). An Indication of the Cause. Translated by David McLintock (1985)
- Der Keller (1976). The Cellar: An Escape. Translated by David McLintock (1985)
- Der Atem (1978). Breath: A Decision. Translated by David McLintock (1985)
- Die Kälte (1981). In the Cold. Translated by David McLintock (1985)
- Ein Kind (1982). A Child. Translated by David McLintock (1985)

=== Miscellaneous ===
- Rosen der Einöde (1959). Roses of the Wasteland. Five pieces for ballet, voice and orchestra.
- Viktor Halbnarr. Ein Wintermärchen nicht nur für Kinder (1966). Victor Halfwit: A Winter's Tale, translated by Martin Chalmers (Seagull Books, 2011).
- Der Italiener (1971). The Italian. Film script and short story; filmed by Ferry Radax in 1971.
- Der Kulterer: Eine Filmgeschichte (1974). Kulterer. Film script and short story; filmed by Vojtěch Jasný in 1974.
- Meine Preise (2009). My Prizes: An Accounting, translated by Carol Brown Janeway (2010).

=== Compilations in English ===
- The President and Eve of Retirement (1982). Collects Der Präsident and Eve of Retirement; translated by Gitta Honegger
- Gathering Evidence (1985, memoir). Collects Die Ursache (1975), Der Keller (1976), Der Atem (1978), Die Kälte (1981) and Ein Kind (1982); translated by David McLintock
- Histrionics: Three Plays (1990). Collects A Party for Boris; Ritter, Dene, Voss; and Histrionics; translated by Peter Jansen and Kenneth Northcott
- Three Novellas (2003). Collects Amras, Playing Watten and Walking; translated by Peter Jansen and Kenneth J. Northcott
- In Hora Mortis / Under the Iron of the Moon (2006, poetry). Collects In hora mortis (1958) and Unter dem Eisen des Mondes (1958); translated by James Reidel
- Collected Poems (2017). Translated by James Reidel
- The Rest Is Slander: Five Stories (2022). Collects "Ungenach" (1968), "The Weatherproof Cape" ("Der Wetterfleck", 1971), "Midland in Stilfs" (1971), "At the Ortler" ("Am Ortler", 1971), and "At the Timberline" ("An der Baumgrenze", 1969); translated by Douglas Robertson
- Save Yourself If You Can: Six Plays (2023). Collects The Ignoramus and the Madman (1972), The Celebrities (1976), Immanuel Kant (1978), The Goal Attained (1981), Simply Complicated (1986), and Elizabeth II (1987); translated by Douglas Robertson
- Of Seven Fir Trees and the Snow: Early Stories (2026). Translated by Douglas Robertson

== See also ==
- List of Austrian writers

== Works cited ==
- Dowden, Stephen D. (1991). Understanding Thomas Bernhard. Columbia, South Carolina: University of South Carolina Press. ISBN 0872497593.
- Honegger, Gitta (2001). Thomas Bernhard: The Making of an Austrian. New Haven and London: Yale University Press. ISBN 0300089996.
- Konzett, Matthies, ed. (2002). A Companion to the Works of Thomas Bernhard. Rochester, NY: Camden House. ISBN 1571132163.
- Mittermayer, Manfred (2015). Thomas Bernhard: Eine Biografie (in German). Vienna and Salzburg: Residenz Verlag. ISBN 978-3701733644.

== Films ==
- Ferry Radax: Thomas Bernhard – Drei Tage (Thomas Bernhard – three days, 1970). Directed by Ferry Radax and based on a written self-portrait by Thomas Bernhard.
- Ferry Radax: Der Italiener (The Italian, 1972), a feature film directed by Ferry Radax and based on a script by Thomas Bernhard.
