= Yılmaz Onay =

Turkish author, theatre director, and translator (1937–2018)

Yilmaz Onay
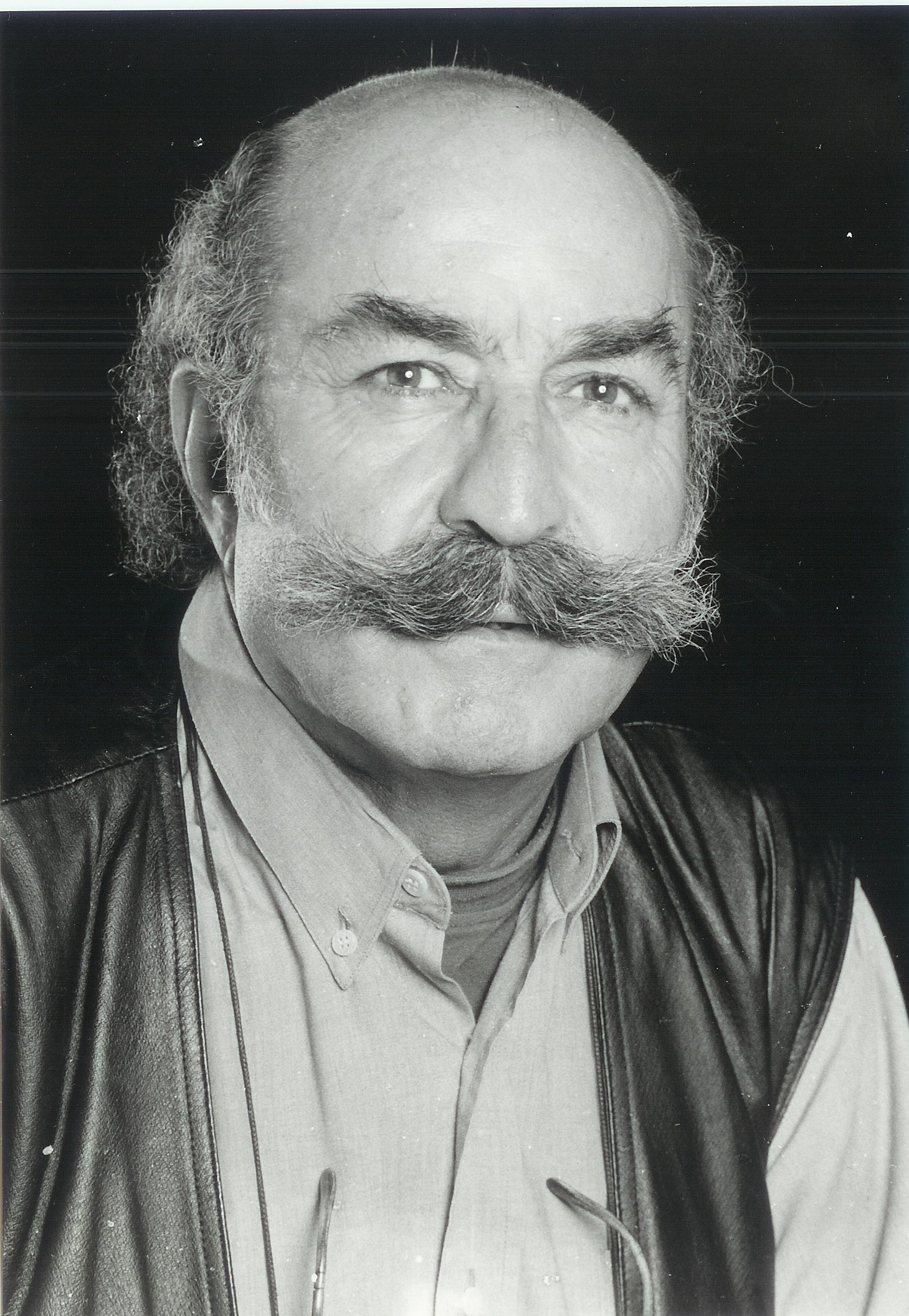
- Born: 20 April 1937; Gaziantep, Turkey
- Died: 9 January 2018 (aged 80)
- Occupation: Playwright · theatre director · translator · novelist
- Writing career
- Genres: Non-Aristotelian drama · Epic theatre · Dialectical theatre

Yılmaz Onay (20 April 1937 – 9 January 2018) was a Turkish author, theatre director and translator.

He translated plays, which most of them are known plays of Bertolt Brecht, stories, novels, books of poems and non-fiction books from German to Turkish and write plays and novels; all published. As a director, he staged most of Brecht's works, in a theatre called Epic Theatre which he was one of the frontiers of this theatre movement in Turkey. Onay's first accomplishment as director was, staging a known play Fear and Misery of the Third Reich written by Brecht.

== Biography ==
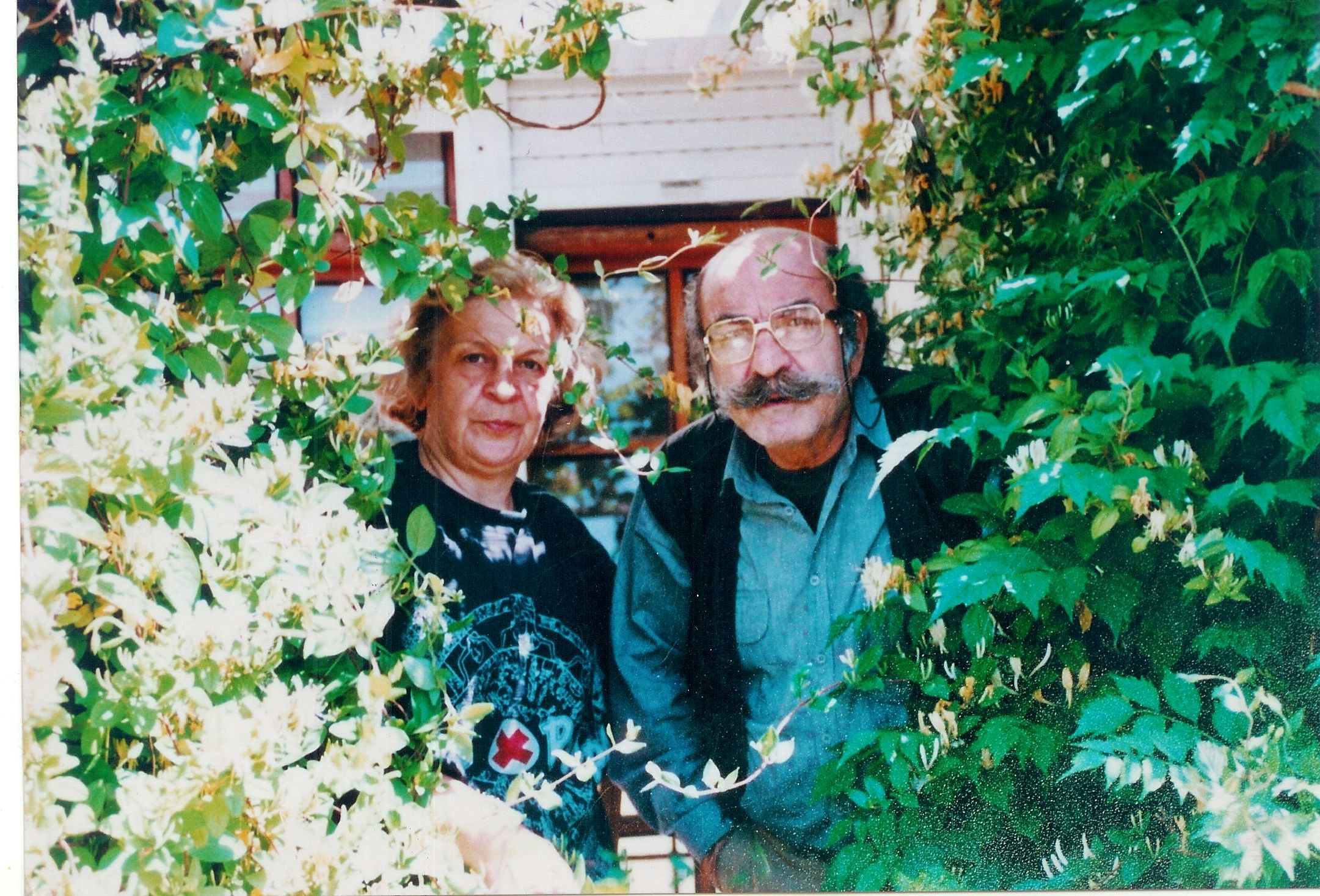
Yılmaz Onay and his Mrs. Yurdanur in Ayvalık. In 2000

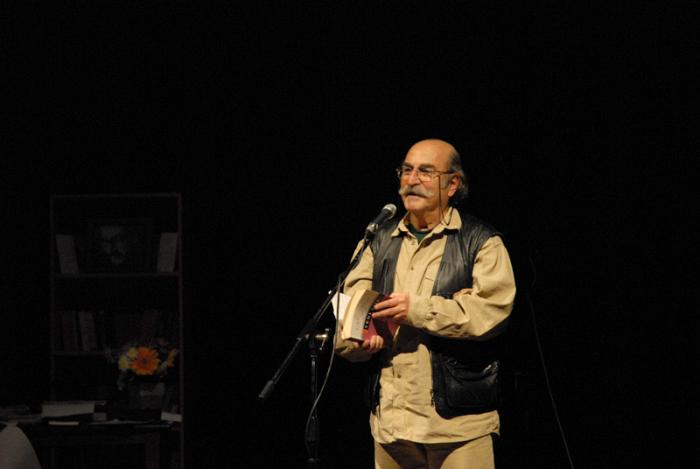
Nazım Hikmet culture centrum. In 1990

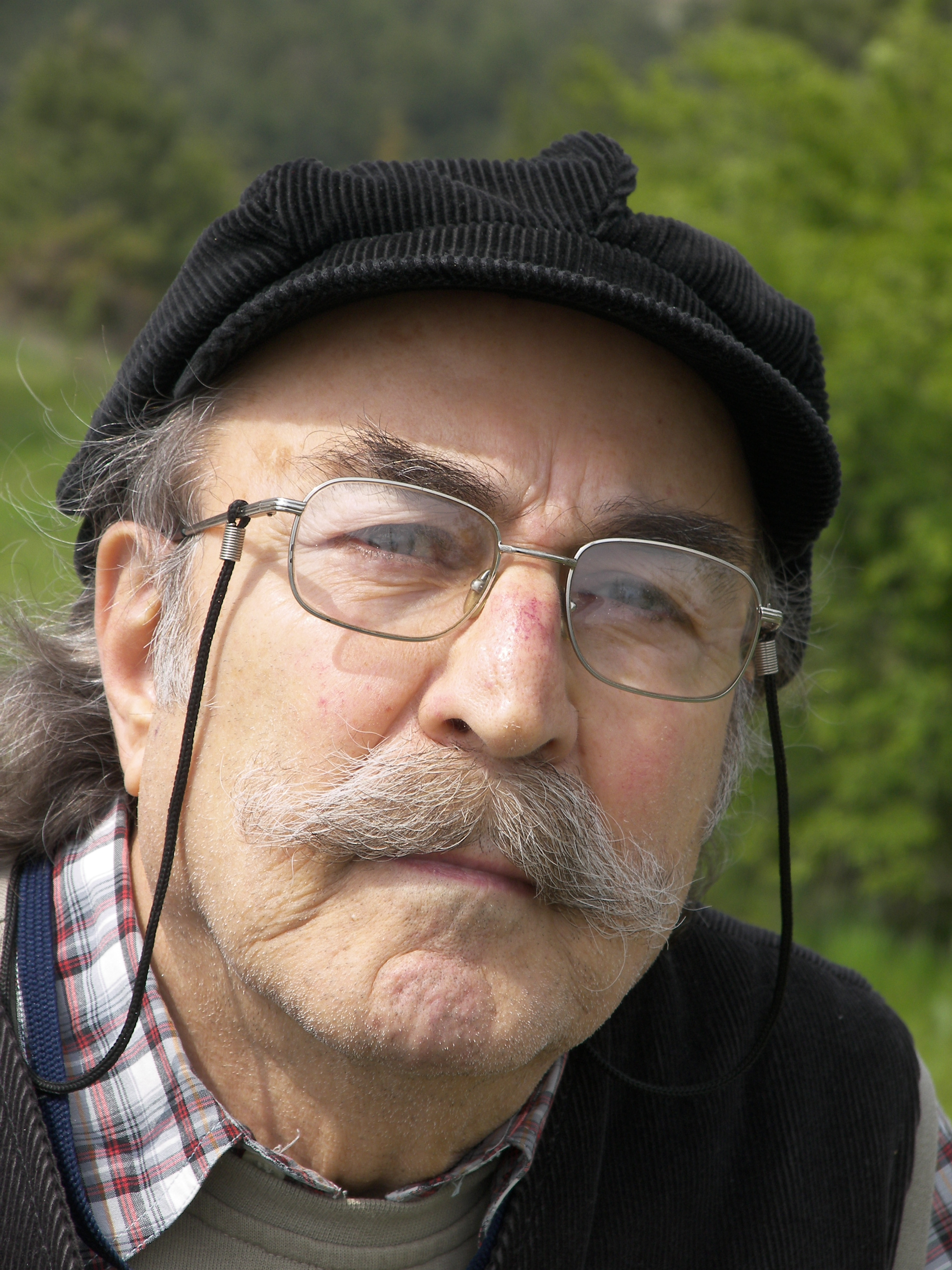
Yilmaz Onay in Rıfat Ilgaz symposium Kastamonu in 2006

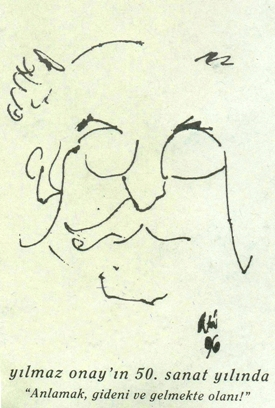
Yılmaz Onay 50 years in art, 14 April 2008

Yılmaz Onay was born in 1937 in Gaziantep. In 1960 he finished his study as a structural engineer at the Istanbul Technical University (İTÜ.) While studying, he was also part of the theatre group called ITÜ theatre. In 1961 he received grants from The German Academic Exchange Service (DAAD) to participate in a research program at the Karlsruhe Institute of Technology, in Germany, which he had the opportunity to form a theatre group consisted of young actors from Germany, Turkey and Egypt, as well as an American soldier. He produced his first piece, The Rulers, the work of Eugène Ionesco, within the scope of the ‘’Duisburger Society Ensemble.’’ A year later, Onay was back to Ankara where he worked with the Cinema and Theatre Association, and the ‘’Ankara Experimental Stage’’, until 1972.

He was awarded with International Peace Party 2nd prize in Istanbul, in 1965, for the work, War Game, which he staged and produced. The piece was adapted from a radio play, Such a Piece, written by Sermet Çagan.

In 1966, Onay shared the "Grand Prix of the Festival Mondial du Theatre de Nancy" with a Brazilian theater troop, for the piece Long Creek, which was adapted from Yaşar Kemal’s novel, Yer Demir, Gök Bakır (Iron Earth, Copper Sky) by Nihat Asyalı.

He took a role in a play, Reading Passage, directed by Max Meinecke. This play was staged at the Goethe Institut in Ankara. The first play he directed, in Ankara Art Theatre (AST,) was Fear and Misery of The Third Empire of Bertolt Brecht, in 1972. In 1973, he was invited by the ITI, (German Centre of the International Theatre Institute,) as a guest student to participate on the urban stages of the city of Essen and Berlin. In 1974, he helped start a new theatre called The Contemporary Stage, in Ankara, where he, from 1975 to 1978, produced and directed plays, adapted from Nazım Hikmet’s Yusuf and Menofis, Nihat Asyalı's Strike, and Gladkov's The Cement. Later in 1984, he directed a play, adapted from a novel by Hans Fallada, called Little Man, What Now?, and a self-written cabaret These Price Raises Are Up Against Me. From 1985 to 1989 he produced and directed his own pieces abroad, Those Who Were Left in Araf and Mystery of Karagöz in Amsterdam, The Death of An Artist in Paris, a play about peace for children, Our Songs Must Not Die, in the Hebbel Theater, Berlin. While in Berlin, he staged and directed a play of Dario Fo, Non Si Paga! Non Si Paga! (We Won't Pay! We Won't Pay!) in 1991. Onay, in the same year, moved to Istanbul, and in 1993 he was appointed as stage director at the Istanbul National Theatre, where he produced and directed numerous plays, including his own. Onay retired from his post in 2002. In 2006, one of his works, The death of an Artist was adapted for a television play by TRT. His other stage plays were performed in Turkey and in different countries several times. In addition, he has published in different newspapers and magazines numerous articles and has taken part in many panel discussions. On 14 April 2008 it was celebrated Yılmaz Onay 50 years in art.

== Works ==
=== Translations from the German ===
==== Stage plays ====
- An Enemy of the People, Henrik Ibsen – Bir Halk Düşmanı
- Mariena Pineda, Federico Garcia Lorca – Mariena Pineda
- Process Richard Waverly, R.Schneider – Richard Waverly Davası
- The Last Ones, Maxim Gorky – Sonuncular
- The Brecht's Act, George Tabori – Brecht Dosyası
- The Trojan Women, Euripides – Troyalı Kadınlar
- Electra, Euripides – Elektra
- The Bible, Bertolt Brecht – İncil
- Baal, B.Brecht – Baal
- Drums in the Night, B.Brecht – Gecede Trampet Sesleri
- The Wedding, B.Brecht – Düğün
- The Beggar, B.Brecht – Dilenci veya Ölü Köpek
- Driving Out a Devil, B.Brecht – Şeytan Kovma
- Lux in Tenebris, B.Brecht – Karanlıkta Işık
- The Catch, B.Brecht – Balık Avı
- The Plain, B.Brecht – Ova
- In the Jungle, B.Brecht – Vahşi Ormanda
- In the Jungle of Cities, B.Brecht – Kentlerin Vahşi Ormanında
- Man Equals Man 1926, B.Brecht – Adam Adamdır 1926
- Man Equals Man 1938, B.Brecht – Adam Adamdır 1938
- Saint Joan of the Stockyards, B.Brecht – Mezbahaların Kutsal Johanna'sı
- The Seven Deadly Sins, B.Brecht – Küçük Burjuvanın Yedi Ölümcül Günahı
- The Horatians and the Curiatians, B.Brecht – Horasyalılar Kuriasyalılar
- Señora Carrar's Rifles, B.Brecht – Carrar Ananın Silahları
- Fear and Misery of the Third Reich, B.Brecht – III.Reich' ın Korku ve Sefaleti
- Mr Puntila and his Man Matti, B.Brecht – Puntila Ağa ile Uşağı Matti
- The Caucasian Chalk Circle, B.Brecht – Kafkas Tebeşir Dairesi
- Round Heads and Pointed Heads, B.Brecht – Sivri Kafalılar ve Yuvarlak Kafalılar / Yuvarlak Kafalılar ve Sivri Kafalılar

==== Stories ====
- The Stories Anna Seghers, Anna Seghers – Öyküler

==== Novels ====
- Living, Glimmering, Lying, Botho Strauß – Evlerde Uyur Uyanık Yalanlar

==== Lyric ====
- Svendborg's Poems, Bertolt Brecht – Svendborg Şiirleri
- Steffin's Collection, Bertolt Brecht – Steffin Derlemeleri
- Hollywood Elegies, Bertolt Brecht – Hollywood Elejileri
- Poems in Exile, Bertolt Brecht – Sürgün Şiirleri
- War Primer, Bertolt Brecht – Savaş El Kitabı
- German Satires (2nd part), Bertolt Brecht – Alman Taşlamaları (İkinci bölüm)
- Children's Songs, Bertolt Brecht – Çocuk Şarkıları
- New Children's Songs, Bertolt Brecht – Yeni Çocuk Şarkıları
- Buckow Elegies, Bertolt Brecht – Buckow Elejileri
- The Messingkauf Dialogues, Bertolt Brecht – Bakır Alımı

==== Non-fiction books ====
- Agitprop Troops, A.Kammrad – F.R.Scheck – İşçi Tiyatroları – Ajitprop Topluluklar
- Worksjournal, B.Brecht – Brecht'le Yaşamak – Çalışma Günlüğü
- The Epic theatre, Marianne Kesting – Epik Tiyatro
- Literatur Science, an Introduction, G.N.Pospelov – Edebiyat Bilimi
- West and Not Forget, Daniela Dahn – Batı Diye Diye
- Theatrical Work, Berliner Ensemble – Tiyatro Çalışması
- An Introduction To The Greek Tragedy, Joachim Latacz – Antik Yunan Tragedyaları

=== Own works ===
==== Stage plays ====
- Tren Gidiyor – The Train Goes
- Bu Zamlar Bana Karşı – These Price Raises Are Up Against Me
- Dev Masalı – The Dragon's Fairy Tale
- Sevdalı Bulut – The Cloud In Love – adapted from Nazım Hikmet's story
- Şarkılarımız Ölmesin – Our Songs Must Not Die
- Küçük Adam N'oldu Sana? – Little Man, What Now? – adapted from Hans Fallada's novel
- Sanatçının Ölümü – The Death Of An Artist
- Arafta Kalanlar – Those, Who Were Left in Purgatory
- Karagözün Muamması – Mystery Of Karagöz
- Karadul Efsanesi – The Legend Of Black Widow
- Hücre İnsanı – Homo Zellicus
- Prometheia – Prometheia
- Karakedi Geçti – The Black Ran Through The Way

==== Novels ====
- Yazılar FİLMATİK – Footnote FİLMATİK
- Oyun Değil – No Play

==== Non-fiction books ====
- Gerçekçilik Yeniden – Realism Again!
