= Margarete Steffin =

German actress and writer

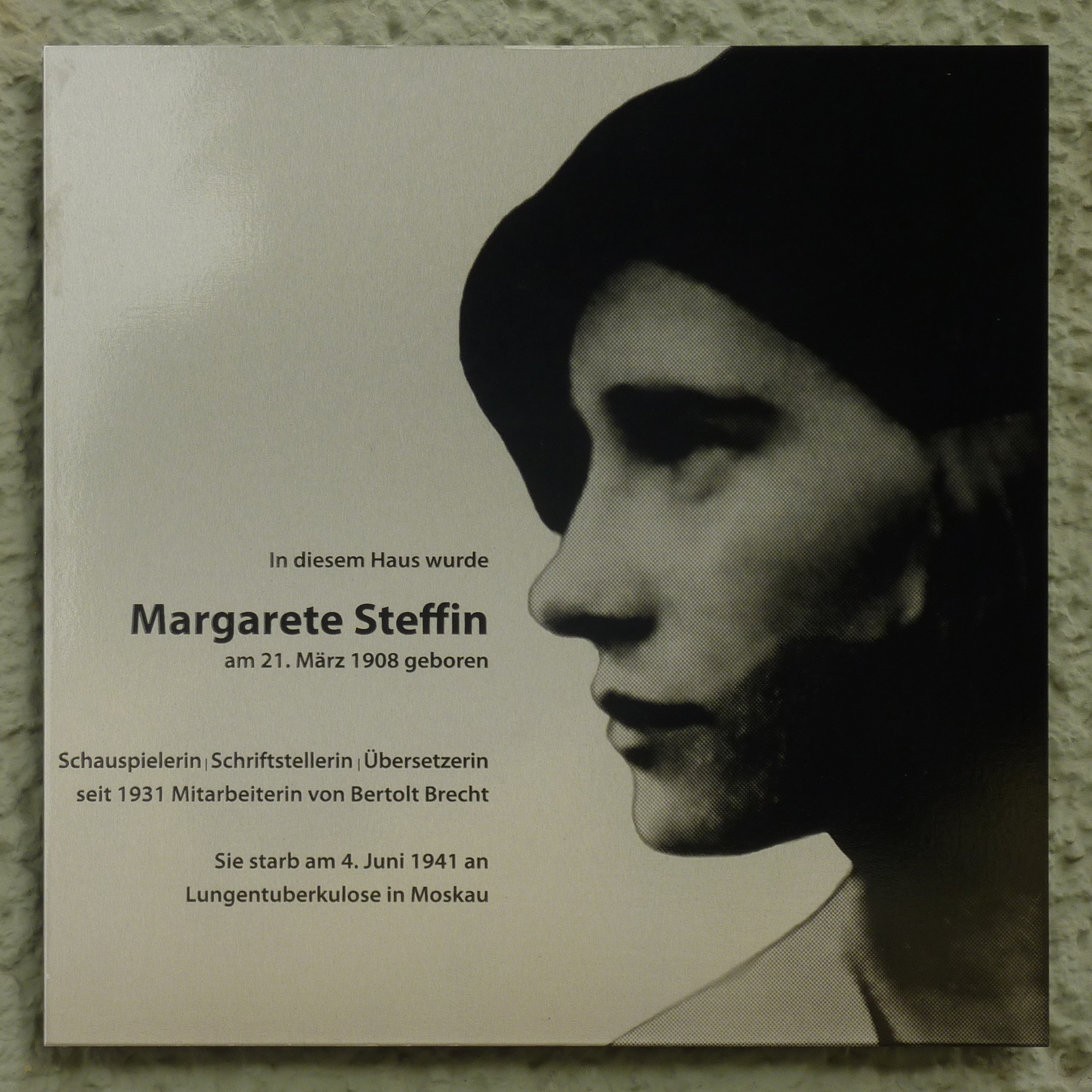
Commemorative plaque at the birthplace of Margarete Steffin

Margarete Emilie Charlotte Steffin (21 March 1908, Rummelsburg – 4 June 1941, Moscow) was a German actress and writer, one of Bertolt Brecht's closest collaborators, as well as a prolific translator from Russian and Scandinavian languages.

== Biography ==
Born to a working-class family, at the age of fourteen she went to work for the phone company but her interest in Social Democratic politics got her fired. She worked in publishing and communist youth agitprop theatre and worked at the Rote Revue. In 1931, she took a diction class from Brecht's wife Helene Weigel and became his lover. She was introduced to the Theater am Schiffbauerdamm, playing a maid in Die Mutter (1932).

In 1933, Brecht and Weigel went into exile in Denmark. Though soon replaced as Brecht's lover by Ruth Berlau, Steffin entered an arranged marriage to a Danish citizen to stay as Brecht's secretary and followed the Brechts to Finland and Moscow when war broke out. She died from tuberculosis (diagnosed already in 1931) in Moscow while awaiting an American visa. Brecht wrote six short poems on hearing of her death, eventually published together as Nach dem Tod meiner Mitarbeiterin M. S. The second reads:

My general is fallen
My soldier is fallen

My pupil has left
My teacher has left

My nurse is gone
My nursling is gone.

Brecht's 1955 Collected Works names Steffin as the collaborator on Roundheads and Peakheads, Señora Carrar's Rifles and The Horatians and the Curiatians. In addition Brecht acknowledged her role in Fear and Misery in the Third Reich, Life of Galileo and Mother Courage. She is also thought to have had a large hand in Mr Puntila and his Man Matti, The Good Person of Szechwan, The Resistible Rise of Arturo Ui, and The Caucasian Chalk Circle.

Steffin also corresponded with Walter Benjamin and Arnold Zweig.

== Works ==
- Zwillinge, 1932
- Heute träumt ich, dass ich bei dir läge, 1933
- Von der Liebe und dem Krieg, 1933, Europäische Verlags-Anstalt, Hamburg 2001, ISBN 3-434-50461-3
- So wurde ich Laufmädchen, 1933
- Die große Sache, 1933
- Briefe an berühmte Männer, Europäische Verlags-Anstalt, Hamburg 1999, ISBN 3-434-50437-0
- Konfutse versteht nichts von Frauen, Rowohlt, Berlin 1991 ISBN 3-87134-032-4
