= Interruptions (epic theatre) =

The technique of interruption pervades all levels of the stage work of the German modernist theatre practitioner Bertolt Brecht—the dramatic, theatrical and performative. At its most elemental, it is a formal treatment of material that imposes a "freeze", a "framing", or a change of direction of some kind; something that is in progress (an action, a gesture, a song, a tone) is halted in some way.

The technique of interruption produces an effect on the dramatic level akin to the 'pair of scissors' that Brecht imagines cutting a drama into pieces, "which remain fully capable of life"; the metaphor of the cut is a pertinent one, as the technique bears striking similarities to the principles of montage being developed in the Soviet Union contemporaneously with Brecht's "epic theatre" (by the film-makers Eisenstein, Vertov, Pudovkin, and Kuleshov).

== Works cited ==
- Benjamin, Walter. 1983. Understanding Brecht. Trans. Anna Bostock. London and New York: Verso. ISBN 0-902308-99-8.
- Brecht, Bertolt. 1964. Brecht on Theatre: The Development of an Aesthetic. Ed. and trans. John Willett. British edition. London: Methuen. ISBN 0-413-38800-X. USA edition. New York: Hill and Wang. ISBN 0-8090-3100-0.
- Leach, Robert. 1994. "Mother Courage and Her Children". In Thomson and Sacks (1994, 128–138).
- Thomson, Peter and Glendyr Sacks, eds. 1994. The Cambridge Companion to Brecht. Cambridge Companions to Literature Ser. Cambridge: Cambridge University Press. ISBN 0-521-41446-6.
