= Round Heads and Pointed Heads =

Epic parable play written by Bertolt Brecht

- Written by: Bertolt Brecht
- Original language: German
- Genre: Epic parable

Premiere
- Date premiered: 4 November 1936

Round Heads and Pointed Heads (German: Die Rundköpfe und die Spitzköpfe) is an epic parable play written by the German dramatist Bertolt Brecht, in collaboration with Margarete Steffin, Emil Burri, Elisabeth Hauptmann, and the composer Hanns Eisler. The play's subtitle is Money Calls to Money and its authors describe it as "a tale of horror." The play is a satirical anti-Nazi parable about a fictitious country called Yahoo in which the rulers maintain their control by setting the people with round heads against those with pointed heads, thereby substituting racial relations for their antagonistic class relations. The play is composed of 11 scenes in prose and blank verse and 13 songs. Unlike another of Brecht's plays from this period, The Mother, Round Heads and Pointed Heads was addressed to a wide audience, Brecht suggested, and took account of "purely entertainment considerations." Brecht's notes on the play, written in 1936, contain the earliest theoretical application of his "defamiliarization" principle to his own "non-Aristotelian" drama.

== History ==
At the suggestion of Ludwig Berger, the theatre and film director, the play was first conceived in November 1931 as an adaptation of Shakespeare's Measure for Measure for the Young Actors' Group, to be premièred in January 1932 at the Berlin Volksbühne. Brecht considered this play to be Shakespeare's most philosophical and progressive work, which argued that "those in positions of authority [...] ought not to demand of their subjects a moral stance which they cannot adopt themselves." Rehearsals for Brecht's play The Mother distracted him from developing the Round Heads project in December and its planned production in January failed to materialise, but Brecht and his collaborators returned to its development during 1932. The play was re-written in 1934 in preparation for a planned production under the direction of Per Knutzon in Copenhagen, which fears of censorship prevented.

After another re-write in light of its première in 1936, the play was published in German in 1938. Brecht did not return to the play after that date, though he did include it in his collected works of 1955.

== Productions ==
After going into exile from Nazi Germany in 1933, Brecht sent the play to the Soviet playwright Sergei Tretyakov and offered it to theatres in Paris, London, New York, and Prague. Erwin Piscator considered directing the play in Moscow several times during 1935–36. Fears of censorship had prevented a planned production in Copenhagen in 1934 under the direction of Per Knutzon.

The play finally received its première in a Danish-language production there two years later, which Ruth Berlau instigated. It opened on 4 November 1936 at the Riddersalen Theatre (a 220-seat venue), under the direction of Knutzon. Niels Bing played the Landlord, Lulu Ziegler (Knutzon's wife) played Nanna Callas, while Isbella was played by Astrid Schmahl. Svend Johansen designed the sets, based on ideas by the American designer Mordecai Gorelik. The critical response was mixed. Brecht was not upset by this — he remarked some years later that he had seen some people crying at the same scene that others were laughing at, "And I was satisfied with both." Brecht thought it was "one of his best productions" so far, while it provoked a storm of protest from local fascists. The production ran for 21 performances.

The play received its German première in 1948 in Dresden. Berlin saw productions of it in the East in November 1983 at the Deutsches Theater directed by Alexander Lang and a year and a half later in the West at Theatermanufaktur. Manfred Karge directed a production in 1993 at the Akademietheater in Vienna. Brecht's own company, the Berliner Ensemble, staged the play in 1998.

The first US production was directed by Andy Doe in California in 1971, with music for 2 songs by Hanns Eisler and the rest by Lucy Coolidge. Under the title The Roundheads and the Pointeheads or The Rich Work Powerfully Well Together (published by The Risley Review of Reviews), Leonard Lehrman translated (with Gesa Valk), adapted (with Bill Castleman) and staged the first US production with all 14 of Eisler's songs (plus incidental music by Lehrman) in the original orchestrations in November 1973 at Cornell. In 1998, for the Hanns Eisler Centennial, Lehrman presented a concert version with piano and 6 singers of just the songs with narration, at West Park Church in Manhattan. This was in conformance with a note Brecht had written regarding the possibility of presenting the piece with just 6 singers. Eric Bentley, who was present, remarked that perhaps this was the best way to present the play, as the music is its strongest element.

In the summer of 1981, coached by Bill Castleman, students presented song excerpts translated by Lehrman at the Aspen Festival under the direction of Martha Schlamme.

In April 1985, a production was mounted at the Cubiculo Off-off-Broadway theatre in New York City using a new translation by Michael Feingold. It was directed by Jerry Roth. The Feingold translation also served as the basis for Uncivil Wars: Moving with Brecht and Eisler, an adaptation of the play which was created and directed by David Gordon. After several years of development, including a workshop at Cornell University that used the N. Goold-Verschoyle translation, it officially premiered at the Walker Art Center in Minneapolis in March 2009, and was subsequently performed at The Kitchen in New York City, and at the Alexander Kasser Theater of Montclair State University. Gordon's production used all but one of the original Eisler songs, performed by Gina Leishman on piano, pump organ, accordion and ukulele. The piece was re-explored by Gordon in a workshop in Philadelphia in 2014, under the title Political Shenanigans.

== In popular culture ==
- The "Auto Erotic Assimilation" episode of the animated science fiction TV series Rick and Morty, first broadcast on the Adult Swim programming block of Cartoon Network on August 9, 2015, features a war between two races of aliens who look exactly alike, except that one has flat nipples with concentric rings while the other has cone-shaped nipples.
