= Volkswille (disambiguation) =

Volkswille ('People's Will') was a communist newspaper published in Potsdam, East Germany, from 1945 to 1946.

Volkswille may also refer to:

- Der Volkswille (Augsburg, 1919), a newspaper published in Augsburg, Germany, from 1919 to 1921
- Kattowitzer Volkswille, a German-language newspaper published in Kattowitz from 1916 to 1935
- Volkswille, later renamed Arbeiter-Zeitung, a German-language newspaper published in Temesvár/Timișoara between 1893 and 1933
- "Volkswille", an episode of 1989/90 German TV series Löwengrube – Die Grandauers und ihre Zeit
