= Street scene =

Depictions of activity on urban streets

A street scene (German: Straßenszene) is a basic model for epic theater set forth by Bertolt Brecht. It makes use of a simple, "natural" incident, such as could be seen on any street corner: an eyewitness demonstrating to a collection of people how a traffic accident took place. "The bystanders may not have observed what happened, or they may simply not agree with him, may 'see things a different way'; the point is that the demonstrator acts the behavior of driver or victim both in such a way that the bystanders are able to form an opinion about the incident." This model is set forth as the most primitive type of epic theater to be easily understood by the reader or listener.
