= Dansen =

Short play representing WWII allegory and politics

Dansen is a short play by German playwright and dramatist Bertolt Brecht (1898–1956) written in 1939. Although not as widely recognized and produced due to its short length, the play is a good representation both of Brecht's writing style and political beliefs. It serves as an allegory for the actions of European countries during World War II via the experiences of the pig farmer Dansen as he deals with a stranger who is terrorizing local business owners.

== Context ==
Brecht wrote this short play, as well as the very similar How Much Is Your Iron?, while seeking refuge in Denmark and Sweden from the fear of persecution under Nazism. At the time of writing, Germany had annexed Poland and Czechoslovakia following the principle of appeasement that Western powers hoped would keep Adolf Hitler from expanding further.

The character of Dansen represents Denmark, as made clear by the red rag with a white cross (i.e. the Danish flag) he uses to wipe his face. He is assured that the existing contracts between himself and the others in the community will maintain their peace. This belief is representative of Denmark's neutrality during the onset of the war. The Stranger, representing Nazi Germany, opposes him in breaking these contracts, invading the businesses of his neighbors, killing them, and replacing the businesses with German owners. Brecht is direct about this allegory, making clear allusions in the text. For example, when The Stranger asks what Dansen did in the club he and the other business owners were a part of, Dansen replies that they “play cards. [They] played cards at non-intervention.”

== Roles ==
- Dansen is a small man and a pig farmer. He is a firm believer in the binding qualities of business contracts but takes no actions to enforce them.
- The Stranger is a gangster armed with a gun and always wearing a hat that covers his eyes. He moves through the community taking over the businesses therein via lethal force.

== Setting ==
The stage is simple and calls for three houses. All of these structures are both the working places and homes of shopkeepers in the neighborhood. One house has the sign ‘Austrian – Tobacconist’ and another has the sign ‘Czech – Boots and Shoes’ on it. The final house is Dansen's and has a sign in the window that reads ‘Fresh ham’. Next to Dansen's home is a large door to the storehouse where his friend Svedson keeps iron.

== Synopsis ==
=== Scene 1 ===
Dansen talks to the audience while cleaning one of his pigs. He describes the peaceful situation he has with the businesses around him due to the many contracts they have with each other. While he talks, The Stranger enters Austrian's shop and kills him. Hearing this, Dansen is frightened and calls his friend Svedson for advice. Dansen refuses to interfere as he does not have the “right to barge into someone else’s house” and decides to denounce The Stranger in words.

When The Stranger exits the store, he replaces Austrian's name on the shop sign with the German name Ostmarker. He goes over to Dansen who has clearly witnessed the event. After being evasive and noticeably pleased about what happened in the store, The Stranger buys Dansen's silence by purchasing one of his pigs – a transaction that seems to interest Dansen far more than the situation at hand. Upon leaving, The Stranger offers to wrap the pig with a friendship pact he had made with the now dead Austrian. When Dansen questions this, The Stranger rips the contract up and leaves Dansen to his misery.

=== Scene 2 ===
The scene opens with Dansen once again addressing the audience. He is beginning to feel that things are no longer safe in his neighborhood and shares that Svedson, Czech, and himself have been discussing arming themselves using the iron in the storehouse. However, Dansen does not want it to come to this and hopes that The Stranger can't possibly commit such an act again. While he speaks, The Stranger attacks the shop of Czech. Dansen responds by hiding under a tub with one of his pigs to avoid attention.

The Stranger, after exiting the store and replacing its sign with a more German one, notices Dansen as the pig under the tub squeals. He begins to check the door to the iron warehouse and finds it locked. Meanwhile, the phone rings in Dansen's home. Dansen, still in the tub goes to get it and has a loud conversation under the tub with Svedson where he reveals that he is against arming themselves, but that they will make a group agreement against The Stranger. He also reveals that the key to the storehouse is hung about his own neck.

Taking note of this, The Stranger tricks Dansen into signing a friendship pact that will keep him from interfering in his affairs in return for protection. To seal the deal, The Stranger buys another of Dansen's pigs.

=== Scene 3 ===
As the scene opens, Dansen is on the phone with Svedson again, assuring him that everything is fine and that he will be willing to invest his money in arming themselves if The Stranger breaks his contract. As they talk, the sky turns red and a thunder storm begins. The phone goes dead and Dansen begins to patrol the door to Svedson's storehouse, using his rolled up friendship pact with The Stranger as a mock rifle. He mentions that The Stranger has been squabbling with Polack, the horse trader as he falls asleep.

Announced by a sign, Dansen begins to dream. In his dream, The Stranger approaches him fully armed with grenades and a tommy-gun. The Stranger relays that he was attacked by Polack and his neighbors and needs to get into Svedson's warehouse to arm himself. He threatens Dansen with the gun and is repelled by Dansen's contract. Dansen gives the man a speech in which he declares that he will no longer put up with The Stranger's immorality. Dansen concludes by singing a stanza of the Danish royal anthem, King Christian Stood by the Tall Mast.

Dansen is awoken, announced again with a sign, by his pig squealing. The Stranger is still present and actually armed. The Stranger demands the key to the storehouse, kicks Dansen down, and takes it by force. He explains to Dansen that by allowing him to do so, their contract has been honored. He lays claim to all of Dansen's pigs as he enters the storehouse and leaves Dansen stupefied.

== Production history ==
In 2016. Dansen was co-produced by CNP (Montenegrin National Theatre) and FIAT (Festival of International Alternative Theatre) in Podgorica, Montenegro. It was adapted and directed by Damjan Pejanović. Aside from this performance, there is little information on production of the play. A student group, Freshblood Theatre of Warwick University, produced the play alongside How Much Is Your Iron? for the 2012 Edinburgh Fringe Festival. They believed this to be the first production of the piece in English as it was likely that Brecht wrote it for a worker's theatre group just as he was leaving Denmark for Sweden and the play was lost in the transition.
