= Teo Otto =

Swiss stage designer

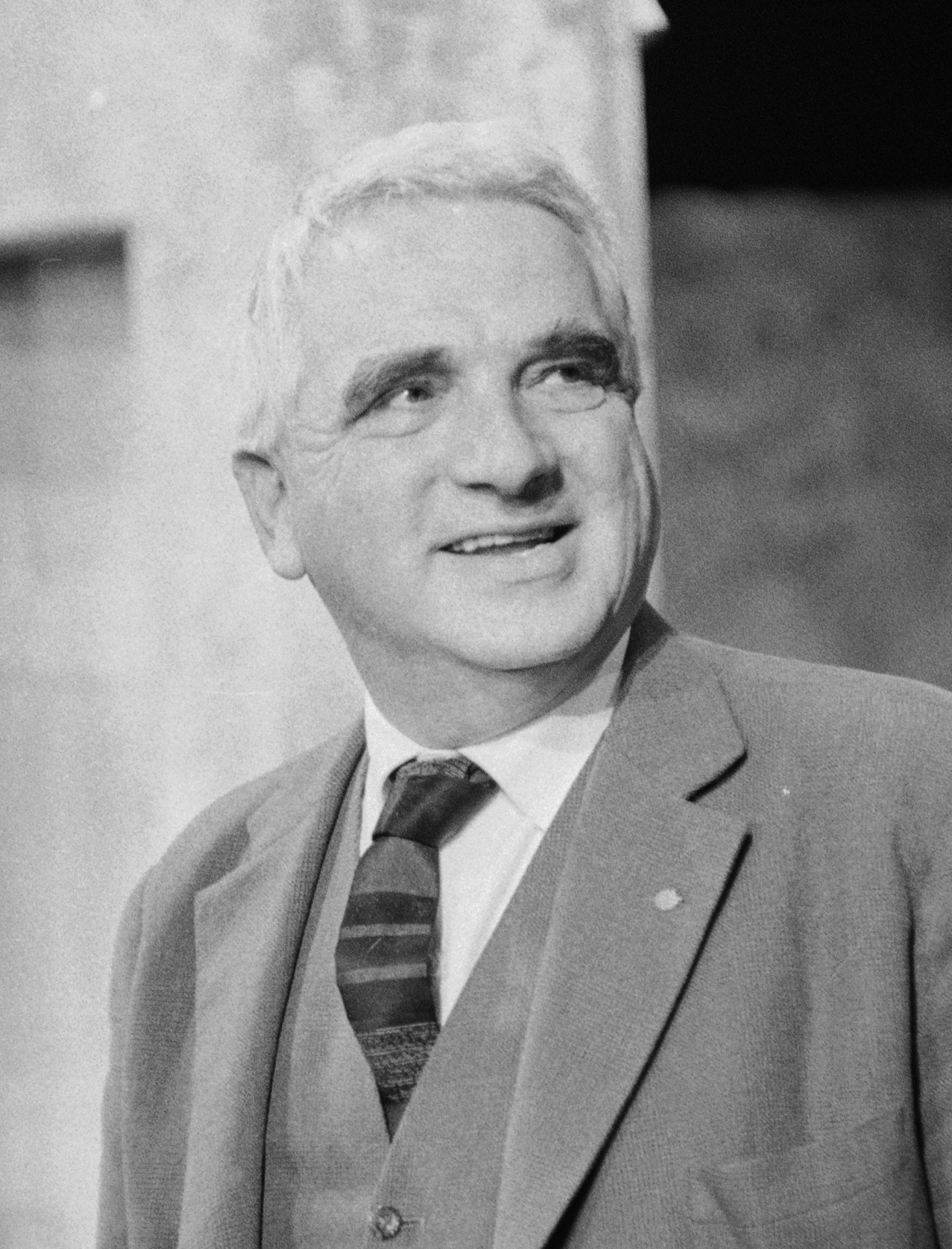
Teo Otto

Teo Otto (1904–1968) was a Swiss stage designer. He trained in Kassel and Paris and in 1926 taught at the Bauhaus in Weimar. In 1928 he became an assistant at the Berlin Staatsoper. Following the Nazis' seizure of power in Germany, he returned to Switzerland where he was resident designer at the Zürich Schauspielhaus for 25 years.

== Theatre designs ==
- 1930: première of The Decision by Bertolt Brecht; directed by Slatan Dudow at the Großes Schauspielhaus in Berlin
- 1941: première of Mother Courage and her Children by Bertolt Brecht; directed by Leopold Lindtberg at the Schauspielhaus Zürich
- 1943: première of The Good Person of Szechwan by Bertolt Brecht; directed by Leonard Steckel at the Schauspielhaus Zürich
- 1943: première of Life of Galileo by Bertolt Brecht; directed by Leonard Steckel at the Schauspielhaus Zürich
- 1948: première of Mr Puntila and his Man Matti by Bertolt Brecht; directed by Kurt Hirschfeld and Brecht at the Schauspielhaus Zürich
- 1949: Mother Courage and her Children by Bertolt Brecht; directed by Brecht and Erich Engel at the Deutsches Theater in Berlin
- 1956: The Good Person of Szechwan by Bertolt Brecht; directed by George Devine at the Royal Court Theatre in London
- 1956: The Good Person of Szechwan by Bertolt Brecht; directed by Eric Bentley at the Phoenix Theatre in New York City
- 1957: The Visions of Simone Machard by Bertolt Brecht; directed by Harry Buckwitz at the Schauspiel Frankfurt

== Sources ==
- Banham, Martin, ed. 1998. The Cambridge Guide to Theatre. Cambridge: Cambridge UP. ISBN 0-521-43437-8.
- Baugh, Christopher. 1994. "Brecht and Stage Design: the Bühnenbildner and the Bühnenbauer." In Thomson and Sacks (1994, 235-253).
- Needle, Jan and Peter Thomson. 1981. Brecht. Chicago: U of Chicago P; Oxford: Basil Blackwell. ISBN 0-226-57022-3.
- Thomson, Peter and Glendyr Sacks, eds. 1994. The Cambridge Companion to Brecht. Cambridge Companions to Literature Ser. Cambridge: Cambridge UP. ISBN 0-521-41446-6.
- Willett, John. 1967. The Theatre of Bertolt Brecht: A Study from Eight Aspects. Third rev. ed. London: Methuen, 1977. ISBN 0-413-34360-X.
- ---. 1997. Introduction. Collected Plays: Three. By Bertolt Brecht. Bertolt Brecht: Plays, Poetry, Prose Ser. London: Methuen. ix-xxvi. ISBN 0-413-70460-2.
