= Von Appen =

Von Appen or von Appen is a surname. Notable people with the surname include:

- Fred von Appen (born 1942), American football player and coach
- Henrik von Appen (born 1994), Chilean alpine skier
- Karl von Appen (1900–1981), German scenic designer
- Mario Von Appen (born 1965), German sprint canoer
