= Horatii and Curiatii (disambiguation) =

The Horatii and the Curiatii can refer to:

- Horatii and Curiatii, two groups of brothers in ancient Roman legend
- The Horatians and the Curiatians, play by Bertholt Brecht
- Gli Orazi e i Curiazi, opera by Domenico Cimarosa (1796)
- Orazi e Curiazi, opera by Saverio Mercadante (1846)
