= Walter Brecht =

German engineer (1900–1986)

Walter Brecht (20 June 1900 – 27 September 1986) was a German scientist and longtime lecturer at the Institut für Papierfabrikation in the Technische Universität Darmstadt. He died in Darmstadt.

== Life ==
=== Early life ===
He was born in Augsburg to Berthold Friedrich Brecht and Wilhelmine Friederike Sophie (née Brezing, 1871–1920), their second son after the future playwright and poet Bertholt. Whilst Sophie was from a Pietist family, Berthold Friedrich was a Roman Catholic from Achern in the Black Forest, becoming a clerk at Augsburg's Haindl’sche Papierfabriken, rising to manager and then in 1914 its director. This allowed the Brecht family to finally move into one of the factory's 'Stiftungshäuser' or foundation houses. Sophie's father Josef Friedrich Brezing (1842–1922) was an official on the Royal Württemberg State Railways at Roßberg (now known as Wolfegg) on the Herbertingen–Isny line, opened just before Sophie's birth. In his autobiographical memoirs "Unser Leben in Augsburg, damals“, Walter himself described his childhood and youth in Augsburg.
