= The Duchess of Malfi (Brecht) =

The Duchess of Malfi is an adaptation by the twentieth-century German dramatist Bertolt Brecht of the English seventeenth-century tragedy of the same name by John Webster, about a 16th-century intrigue in Italy. He collaborated with H. R. Hays and Anglo-American poet, W. H. Auden. It was written during Brecht's period of exile in the United States. It premiered in New York, in 1946.
