= How Much Is Your Iron? =

1939 short play by Bertolt Brecht

- Original title: Was kostet das Eisen?
- Written by: Bertolt Brecht

Premiere
- Date: October 1939
- Place: Tollare folkhögskola
- Directed by: Ruth Berlau

How Much Is Your Iron? (German: Was kostet das Eisen?) is a short play by German modernist playwright Bertolt Brecht. Brecht wrote How Much Is Your Iron? in the fall of 1939 while in exile in Sweden, against the background of the approaching Second World War, following Nazi Germany's annexations of Austria and Czechoslovakia, against which Western powers such as Great Britain and France had at that stage not yet intervened. The play takes a critical look at Sweden's involvement with both Axis and Allied Powers in the build-up to World War Two. It is still produced regularly, playing in 2007 in London with a good review by The Guardian.

== Goal ==
With this play, Brecht wants to accuse capitalism and the weapon dealers that provided the second World War. In his synopsis, Brecht specifically stated that the play be "performed in a slapstick style." The Guardian described it as "a comic parable".

== Synopsis ==
How Much Is Your Iron? is set in the shop of a male character named Svenson, who is repeatedly visited by a gangster-like figure wanting to purchase iron. Neighbouring shopkeepers Herr Austrian and Frau Czech fall victim to the gangster's increasingly violent behavior, but Svenson refuses to join a pact with shopkeeper Herr Britt to ward off the gangster (the "Austrian cigar-merchant and Czech shoeseller are liquidated."). Eventually, Svenson himself falls victim to the gangster.

== Dramaturgical analysis and reviews ==
How Much Is Your Iron? is an allegorical play, which each character representing a European nation in the build-up to World War Two. Some characters are clearly named after the country they represent (Herr Austrian, Frau Czech), while protagonist Svenson represents Sweden, and the gangster personifies Nazi Germany through a representation of Adolf Hitler.

It is not the first time Brecht used allegory to make a political comment with his playwriting, nor the first time he would find inspiration in the representation of the gangster as popularized in 1930s cinema. His earlier play The Resistible Rise of Arturo Ui also dealt with the rise of Nazism and its ties to Germany's pre-war industries, and is presented through an allegorical narrative of vegetable dealers dealing with the dictator-like Ui.

The Guardian gave it four out of five stars, noting that "What will surprise many is how moving the play is ... although the play has a didactic intent, it emphatically proves that agitprop need not exclude art."
