= Saint Joan of the Stockyards =

Play by Bertolt Brecht

- Written by: Bertolt Brecht
- Original language: German
- Subject: Capitalism and religion
- Genre: Non-Aristotelian epic drama
- Setting: Chicago

Premiere
- Date premiered: 30 April 1959
- Place premiered: Deutsches Schauspielhaus, Hamburg

Saint Joan of the Stockyards (German: Die heilige Johanna der Schlachthöfe) is a play written by the German modernist playwright Bertolt Brecht between 1929 and 1931, after the success of his musical The Threepenny Opera and during the period of his radical experimental work with the Lehrstücke. It is based on the musical that he co-authored with Elisabeth Hauptmann, Happy End (1929). In this version of the story of Joan of Arc, Brecht transforms her into "Joan Dark", a member of the "Black Straw Hats" (a Salvation Army-like group) in 20th-century Chicago. The play charts Joan's battle with Pierpont Mauler, the unctuous owner of a meat-packing plant. Like her namesake, Joan is a doomed woman, a martyr and (initially, at least) an innocent in a world of strike-breakers, fat cats, and penniless workers. Like many of Brecht's plays it is laced with humor and songs as part of its epic dramaturgical structure and deals with the theme of emancipation from material suffering and exploitation.

The environment of the Chicago stockyards was well-known to left-wing activists worldwide due to Upton Sinclair's 1906 novel The Jungle. Sinclair had spent about six months investigating the Chicago meatpacking industry for the paper Appeal to Reason, the work which inspired his novel. Sinclair intended to "set forth the breaking of human hearts by a system which exploits the labor of men and women for profit".

The play was broadcast on Berlin Radio on the 11 April 1932, with Carola Neher as Joan and Fritz Kortner as Mauler. The cast also included Helene Weigel, Ernst Busch, Peter Lorre, Paul Bildt and Friedrich Gnaß. The play did not receive its first theatrical production until the 30 April 1959, at the Deutsches Schauspielhaus in Hamburg, after Brecht's death. Brecht had asked Gustaf Gründgens to direct, with scenic design by Caspar Neher and music by Siegfried Franz. Brecht's daughter Hanne Hiob played Joan.

Saint Joan of the Stockyards was given its New York City premiere by the Encompass New Opera Theatre in 1978 in a production which incorporated music, directed by Jan Eliasberg.

Brecht wrote two other versions of the Joan of Arc story: The Visions of Simone Machard (1942) and The Trial of Joan of Arc at Rouen, 1431 (1952).

== Characters ==
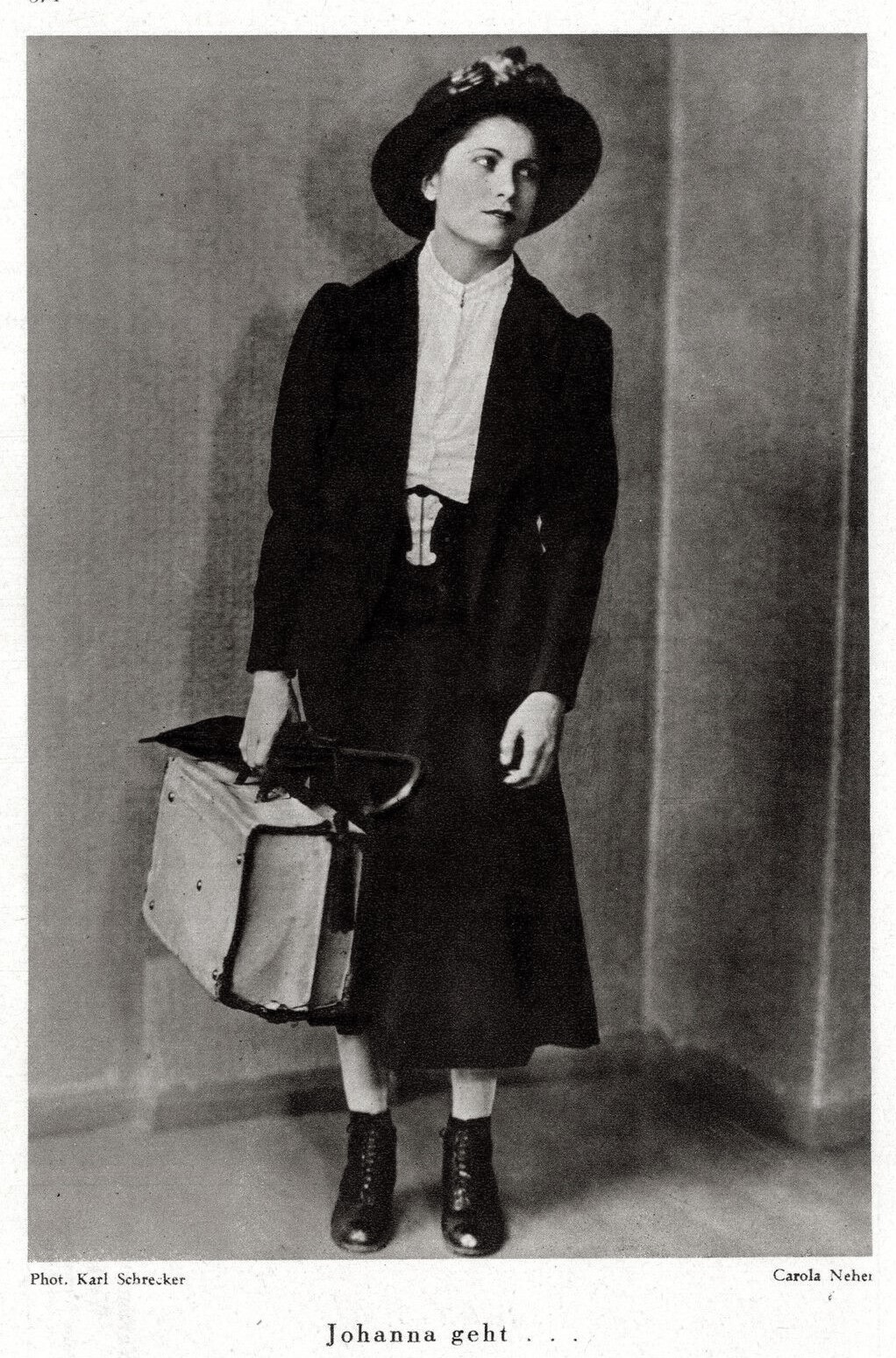
Carola Neher as Joan, 1930

- Joan Dark, lieutenant in the Black Straw Hats
- Pierpont Mauler, meat king
- Cridle, a meat packer
- Graham, a meat packer
- Lennox, a meat packer
- Meyers, a meat packer
- Slift, a broker
- Mrs Luckerniddle
- Gloomb, a worker
- Paul Snyder, major in the Black Straw Hats
- Martha, a Black Straw Hat
- Jackson, a lieutenant in the Black Straw Hats
- Mulberry, a landlord
- A Waiter
- Meat Packers
- Wholesalers
- Stockbreeders
- Brokers
- Speculators
- Black Straw Hats
- Workers
- Labour Leaders
- The Poor
- Detectives
- Newspapermen
- Newsboys
- Soldiers
- Passers-by

== Synopsis ==
The play begins with the capitalists who run the stockyards, represented by mega-tycoon Pierpont Mauler. Mauler confides in his colleague, Cridle, that, after visiting the stockyard for the first time, he wishes to sell his shares and "become a decent man". Another stock holder, Lennox, is rumored to have lost his shares. Mauler strikes a deal with Cridle, which advances his position while at the same time devastating the lives of the 50,000 workers whose livelihoods are in the stockyards.

Joan enters just outside of the Black Straw Hats Mission, a Salvation Army-type organization whose events draw dozens of workers, but only as long as there is soup. Joan urges the workers to embrace God in light of life's injustices, but finds it difficult to distract them from hunger and the failing market. When the workers learn of Mauler's deal, they panic. Desperate to find a way to connect to them, Joan goes to the stockyards in order to find and confront Mauler.

Joan and Martha, another Black Straw Hat, wait outside of the Livestock Exchange as Cridle, Graham, Lenox and Mauler discuss the market and Lennox's sad fate. Cridle insists that Mauler lower the asking price for his shares of the stockyard, arguing that the state of the market lessens their worth.

Joan asks Mauler why he sold the slaughterhouses and he admits that he does not want to be involved with such a bloody business. Joan manages to stun Mauler with her simplicity and beauty. He forcibly takes money from the workers, gives it to Joan, and tells her to distribute it to the poor.

Mauler arranges for Joan to have a tour and see the "wickedness" of the poor workers whom she pities. She is stunned by the cruelty that she sees.

When a worker offers her a dangerous position in order to advance himself, she takes it, and finds herself trapped among the workers. Joan begins to see the corruption in all the larger institutions, including her own Black Straw Hats. She disaffiliates from the mission.

Mauler sees the imminent downfall of the market and attributes his financial situation to his poor relationship with God. He embraces religion and warns his colleagues that their property will fail them, but turning to God could save them from destitution.

By the end of the play, Mauler preaches with the Black Straw Hats and Joan dies a bitter, cynical martyr in a world of heartless capitalists, strike-breakers, and penniless workers.
