= Don Juan (Brecht play) =

Don Juan is an adaptation by the twentieth-century German dramatist Bertolt Brecht of the 17th century French play Dom Juan by Molière. It was the first performance of the Berliner Ensemble after its move to Theater am Schiffbauerdamm, in 1954.

== Works cited ==
- Willett, John. 1959. The Theatre of Bertolt Brecht: A Study from Eight Aspects. London: Methuen. ISBN 0-413-34360-X.
