= Die Lösung =

Poem by Bertolt Brecht

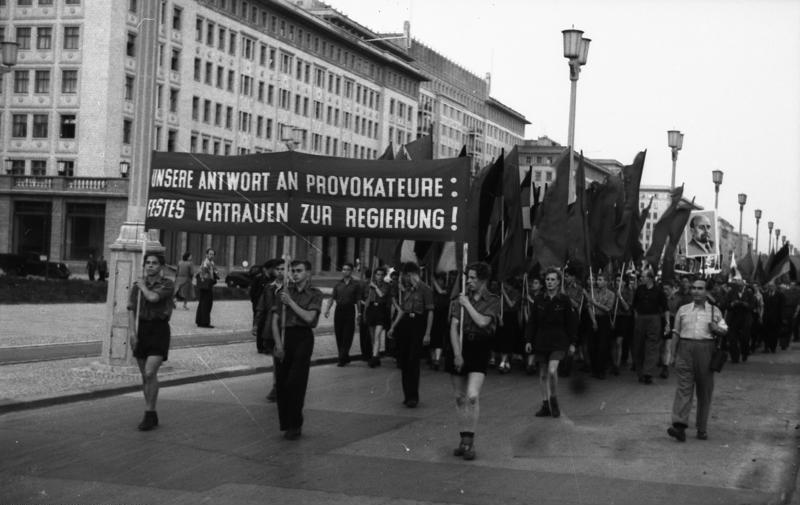
A government-sponsored march on the Stalinallee in 1953. The banner reads "Our answer to provocateurs: firm confidence in the government!"

"Die Lösung" ([diː ˈløːzʊŋ], "The Solution") is a famous satirical German poem by Bertolt Brecht about the East German uprising of 1953. Written in mid-1953, it is critical of the government and was not published at the time. It was first published in 1959 in the West German newspaper Die Welt.

== Text ==
Die Lösung

Nach dem Aufstand des 17. Juni
Ließ der Sekretär des Schriftstellerverbands
In der Stalinallee Flugblätter verteilen
Auf denen zu lesen war, daß das Volk
Das Vertrauen der Regierung verscherzt habe
Und es nur durch verdoppelte Arbeit
zurückerobern könne. Wäre es da
Nicht doch einfacher, die Regierung
Löste das Volk auf und
Wählte ein anderes?

The Solution

After the uprising of the 17th of June
The Secretary of the Writers' Union
Had leaflets distributed on the Stalinallee
Which stated that the people
Had squandered the confidence of the government
And could only win it back
By redoubled work. Would it not in that case
Be simpler for the government
To dissolve the people
And elect another?
