= The Mother (Brecht play) =

Play by Bertolt Brecht

The Mother (German: Die Mutter) is a play by the German modernist playwright Bertolt Brecht. It is based on Maxim Gorky's 1906 novel of the same name.

== Background ==
It was written in collaboration with Hanns Eisler, Slatan Dudow and Günther Weisenborn in 1930–31 in prose dialogue with unrhymed irregular free verse and ten initial songs in its score, with three more added later. Eisler rewrote the incidental music as a cantata, op. 25, for chorus, solo voices and two pianos for a 1935 New York stage production. The play's full German title is Die Mutter. Leben der Revolutionärin Pelagea Wlassowa aus Twer (The mother. Life of the Revolutionary Pelagea Vlassova from Tver).

== Performance history ==
It premièred on 17 January 1932 at the Komödienhaus am Schiffbauerdamm (near Theater am Schiffbauerdamm, but not the same) in Berlin. It was directed by Emil Burri and the scenic design was by Caspar Neher. Helene Weigel played the Mother and Ernst Busch played Pavel. Years later, Brecht directed the play with the Berliner Ensemble at the Deutsches Theater in Berlin in a production that opened on 10 January 1951. Neher also designed the sets for this production and Helene Weigel recreated the lead role, with Ernst Kahler playing Pavel and Busch as Lapkin. After Brecht's death, Manfred Wekwerth revised that production at the Theater am Schiffbauerdamm with a changed cast; this production was filmed.

Brecht wrote The Mother at a time when Hitler was gaining power in Germany. During a performance the Nazis arrested the leading actor to prevent the public from seeing the play.

Between 1973 and 1975, placards quoting Richard Nixon and George Jackson were hung on the set of the San Francisco Mime Troupe's production of The Mother, rather than the quotes by Karl Marx and Vladimir Lenin called for in the original script.

== Interpretation ==
In the play, Brecht utilizes narrative, irony, the juxtaposition of self-proclaimed "truths" to reveal their flaws, the concretizing of complex ideas into dramatic events, an understanding and simple presentation of human behaviour, and a comedic optimism that things can be changed and that reason and common sense will overcome fear and superstition. Vlassov is Brecht's entirely positive major character, who endures a long and difficult road to liberation.

The Mother is Brecht's most elaborate use of his radically experimental Lehrstücke, or "learning plays", which he describes as "a piece of anti-metaphysical, materialistic, non-Aristotelian drama." The play suggests that to become a good mother involves more than just complaining about the price of soup; rather, one must struggle against it, not only for her and her family's sake, but for the sake of all working families. The title character, the mother Pelagea Vlassova, journeys through the play's fourteen scenes, the death of her son, and her own impending illness, fighting illiteracy while constantly filled with good humor and wily activism. The moment in October 1917 when she becomes free to carry and raise her own Red Flag on the eve of the czar's overthrow proves momentous. The play has garnered continued recognition for its forensic, witty and, some would say, humanist critique of capitalism seen through the experiences of those obliged, as Brecht saw it, to live beneath that system's crushing weight.

== Sources ==
- Willett, John. 1959. The Theatre of Bertolt Brecht: A Study from Eight Aspects. London: Methuen. ISBN 0-413-34360-X.
