= The Visions of Simone Machard =

1942 play by Bertolt Brecht

The Visions of Simone Machard (German: Die Gesichte der Simone Machard) is a play by the German modernist playwright Bertolt Brecht. Written in 1942, the play is the second of three treatments of the Joan of Arc story that Brecht created (after Saint Joan of the Stockyards (written 1929–1931) and before The Trial of Joan of Arc at Rouen, 1431 (1952)). The play was jointly written with Lion Feuchtwanger and was completed during their exile in Los Angeles. Set in France in 1940, it portrays Joan as the patron saint of the resistance movement against the Germans. It was first staged in Frankfurt am Main, in 1957.

== Plot ==
In the play, an adolescent girl named Simone works at a gas station in central France. Her older brother is a soldier in the army, and the Wehrmacht forces are approaching. While engrossed in a book about Saint Joan, she slips into a series of dreams in which the real persons in her life take on other identities. Her brother appears as an angel, her boss as the coward Connetand, and herself as Saint Joan who helps starving refugees and defies her employer. In real life she sets fire to a secret supply of gasoline before the Germans can get to it. In her dream, she is captured and sentenced to death, but in real life she is not yet considered a saboteur. The Germans hand her over to the French as a mere arsonist, and she is led away by nuns to a mental institution.

== Adaptations ==
In 1961, London's Unity Theatre staged the play's British premiere; adapted by Arnold Hinchcliffe and directed by Heinz Bernard, the production received favourable reviews in the European press.
