= Volkswille =

Newspaper in Potsdam (1945–1946)

Volkswille ('People's Will') was a communist newspaper published in Potsdam, East Germany, from 1945 to 1946. The frequency of publishing shifted from daily, weekly and triweekly. It merged with Märker, forming the newspaper Märkische Volksstimme.
