= Der Volkswille (Augsburg, 1919) =

Newspaper (1919-21)

Der Volkswille ('The Popular Will' or 'The People's Will') was a newspaper published in Augsburg, Germany from 1919 to 1921. The newspaper was founded in September 1919 as a daily organ for the Independent Social Democratic Party of Germany (USPD) in Swabia and Neuburg. The editor of Der Volkswille was Wendelin Thomas, an USPD Reichstag member.

In October 1919 Bertolt Brecht became a regular opera and theatre critic for Der Volkswille, he remained in this position until the end of the existence of the publication. Between 25 October 1919 and 12 January 1921 Brecht contributed with 25 reviews in Der Volkswille.

On 1 December 1920 Der Volkswille became an organ of the Communist Party of Germany (KPD).

Der Volkswille was banned in early 1921. Bayerische Arbeiterzeitung ('Bavarian Workers Newspaper') was founded as a successor of Der Volkwille.

It is not to be confused with Volkswille that began publication in Augsburg in 1876.
