= Driving Out a Devil =

- Written by: Bertolt Brecht
- Original language: German
- Genre: One-act farce
- Setting: Bavaria

Driving Out a Devil (German: Er treibt den Teufel aus) is an early one-act farce by the 20th-century German dramatist Bertolt Brecht. It was written in prose, probably in 1919, and was first published in volume 13 of Brecht's Stücke. The play charts the attempts of a self-confident and manipulative Bavarian peasant boy to outwit the vigilant parents of a girl of his village. Ronald Hayman suggests that this play dramatises most clearly Brecht's own ability to influence people.

== Sources ==
- Brecht, Bertolt. 1994. Collected Plays: One. Ed. John Willett and Ralph Manheim. Bertolt Brecht: Plays, Poetry, Prose Ser. London: Methuen. ISBN 0-413-68570-5.
- Hayman, Ronald. 1983. Brecht: A Biography. London: Weidenfeld & Nicolson. ISBN 0-297-78206-1.
- Thomson, Peter and Glendyr Sacks, eds. 1994. The Cambridge Companion to Brecht. Cambridge Companions to Literature Ser. Cambridge: Cambridge University Press. ISBN 0-521-41446-6.
- Willett, John. 1967. The Theatre of Bertolt Brecht: A Study from Eight Aspects. Third rev. ed. London: Methuen, 1977. ISBN 0-413-34360-X.
- Willett, John and Ralph Manheim. 1970. Introduction. In Collected Plays: One by Bertolt Brecht. Ed. John Willett and Ralph Manheim. Bertolt Brecht: Plays, Poetry and Prose Ser. London: Methuen. ISBN 0-416-03280-X. vii–xvii.
