= Bertolt Brecht =

German playwright and poet (1898–1956)

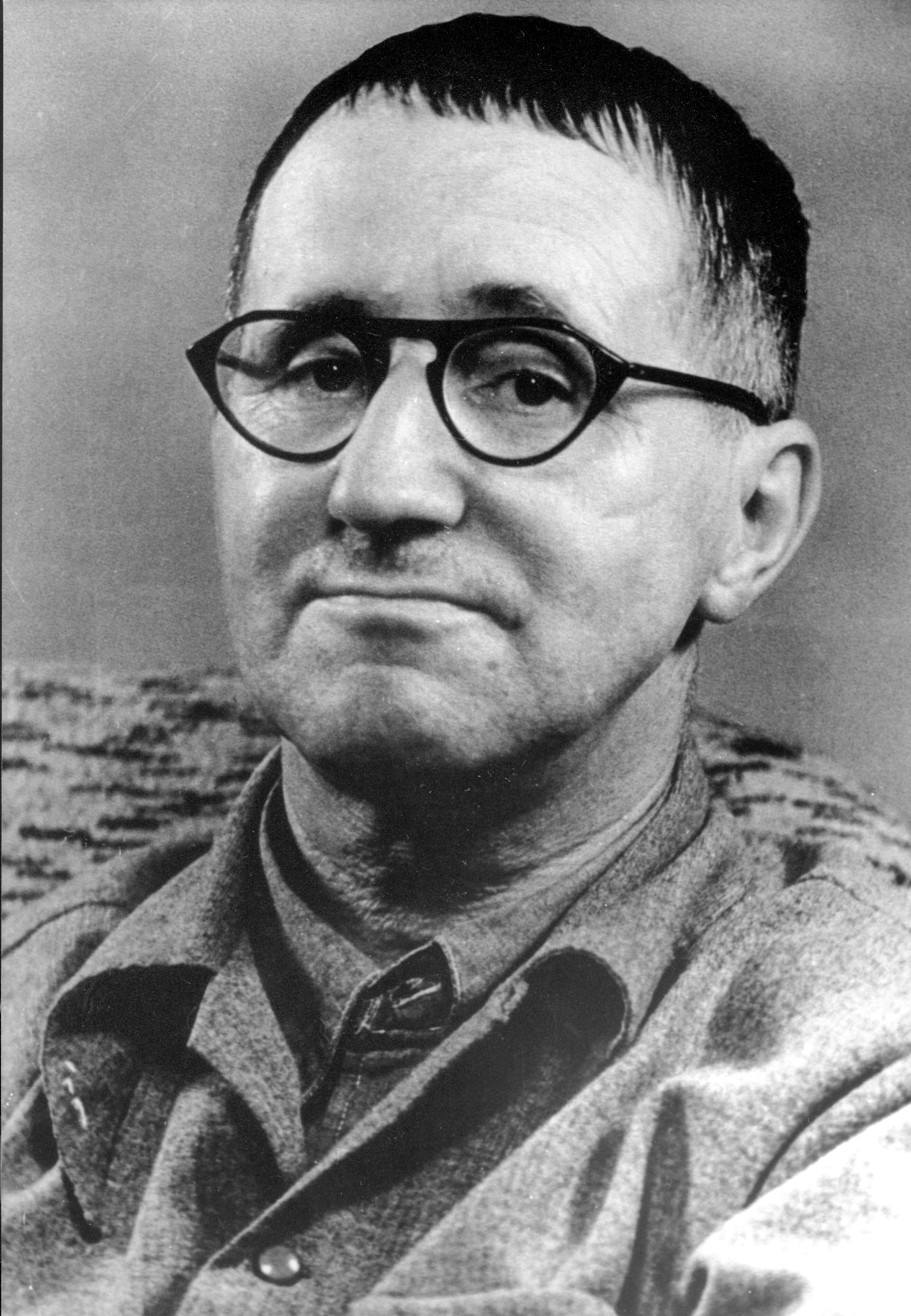
- Brecht in 1954
- Born: Eugen Berthold Friedrich Brecht; 10 February 1898; Augsburg, Bavaria, German Empire
- Died: 14 August 1956 (aged 58); East Berlin, East Germany
- Occupations: Playwright; theatre director; poet; screenwriter
- Spouses: Marianne Zoff (m. 1922; div. 1927) Helene Weigel (m. 1930)
- Children: 4, including Hanne, Stefan and Barbara
- Relatives: Walter Brecht (brother)
- Writing career
- Genre: Epic theatre
- Notable works: The Threepenny Opera; Life of Galileo; Mother Courage and Her Children; The Good Person of Szechwan; The Caucasian Chalk Circle; Mr Puntila and His Man Matti; The Resistible Rise of Arturo Ui
- Movement: Non-Aristotelian drama

Signature
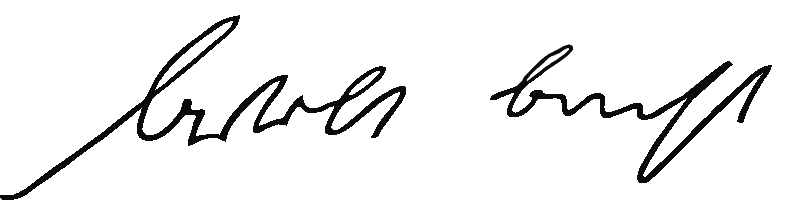

Eugen Berthold Friedrich Brecht (Note: Pronounced /brɛxt/ BREKHT; German: [ˈbɛʁtɔlt ˈbʁɛçt].) (10 February 1898 – 14 August 1956), known as Bertolt Brecht and Bert Brecht, was a German theatre practitioner, playwright, and poet. Coming of age during the Weimar Republic, he had his first successes as a playwright in Munich and moved to Berlin in 1924, where he wrote The Threepenny Opera with Elisabeth Hauptmann and Kurt Weill and began a lifelong collaboration with the composer Hanns Eisler. Immersed in Marxist thought during this period, Brecht wrote didactic Lehrstücke and became a leading theoretician of epic theatre (which he later preferred to call "dialectical theatre") and the Verfremdungseffekt.

When the Nazis came to power in Germany in 1933, Brecht fled his home country, initially to Scandinavia. During World War II he moved to Southern California, where he established himself as a screenwriter while being surveilled by the FBI. In 1947, he was part of the first group of Hollywood film artists to be subpoenaed by the House Un-American Activities Committee for alleged Communist Party affiliations. The day after testifying, he returned to Europe, eventually settling in East Berlin, where he co-founded the theatre company Berliner Ensemble with his wife and long-time collaborator, actress Helene Weigel.

== Life and career ==
=== Bavaria (1898–1924) ===
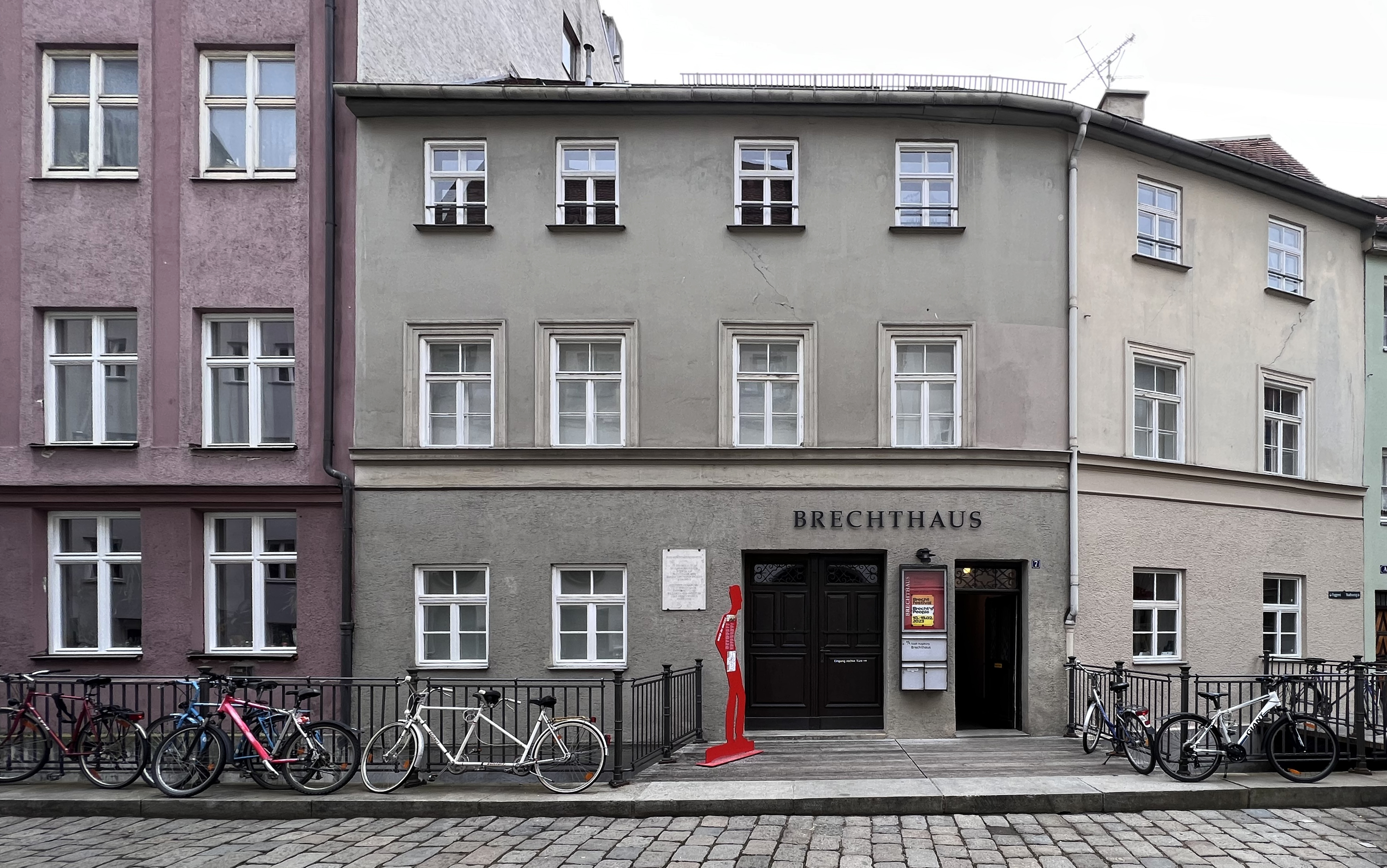
Brecht's birthplace in Augsburg

Eugen Berthold Friedrich Brecht (as a child known as Eugen) was born on 10 February 1898 in Augsburg, Germany, the son of Berthold Friedrich Brecht (1869–1939) and his wife Sophie, née Brezing (1871–1920). Brecht's mother was a devout Protestant and his father a Roman Catholic (who had been persuaded to have a Protestant wedding). The modest house where he was born is today preserved as a Brecht Museum. His father worked for a paper mill, becoming its managing director in 1914. At Augsburg, his maternal grandparents lived in the neighbouring house. They were Pietists and his grandmother influenced Bertolt Brecht and his brother Walter considerably during their childhood.

Due to his grandmother's and his mother's influence, Brecht knew the Bible, a familiarity that would have a life-long effect on his writing. From his mother came the "dangerous image of the self-denying woman" that recurs in his drama. Brecht's home life was comfortably middle class, despite what his occasional attempt to claim peasant origins implied. At school in Augsburg he met Caspar Neher, with whom he formed a life-long creative partnership. Neher designed many of the sets for Brecht's dramas and helped to forge the distinctive visual iconography of their epic theatre.

When Brecht was 16, World War I broke out. Initially enthusiastic, Brecht soon changed his mind on seeing his classmates "swallowed by the army". Brecht was nearly expelled from school in 1915 for writing an essay in response to the line Dulce et decorum est pro patria mori from the Roman poet Horace, calling it Zweckpropaganda ("cheap propaganda for a specific purpose") and arguing that only an empty-headed person could be persuaded to die for their country. His expulsion was only prevented by the intervention of Romuald Sauer, a priest who also served as a substitute teacher at Brecht's school.

On his father's recommendation, Brecht sought to avoid being conscripted into the army by exploiting a loophole which allowed for medical students to be deferred. He subsequently registered for a medical course at the Ludwig-Maximilians-Universität München, where he enrolled in 1917. There he studied drama with Arthur Kutscher, who inspired in the young Brecht an admiration for the iconoclastic dramatist and cabaret star Frank Wedekind.

From July 1916, Brecht's newspaper articles began appearing under the new name "Bert Brecht" (his first theatre criticism for the Augsburger Volkswille appeared in October 1919). Brecht was drafted into military service in the autumn of 1918, only to be posted back to Augsburg as a medical orderly in a military VD clinic; the war ended a month later.

In July 1919, Brecht and Paula Banholzer (with whom he had begun a relationship in 1917) had a son, Frank. Frank died in 1943, as a Wehrmacht conscript on the Eastern Front. In 1920 Brecht's mother died.

Some time in either 1920 or 1921, Brecht took a small part in the political cabaret of the Munich comedian Karl Valentin. Brecht's diaries for the next few years record numerous visits to see Valentin perform. Brecht compared Valentin to Charlie Chaplin, for his "virtually complete rejection of mimicry and cheap psychology". Writing in his Messingkauf Dialogues years later, Brecht identified Valentin, along with Wedekind and Büchner, as his "chief influences" at that time:

But the man he learnt most from was the clown Valentin, who performed in a beer-hall. He did short sketches in which he played refractory employees, orchestral musicians or photographers, who hated their employers and made them look ridiculous. The employer was played by his partner, Liesl Karlstadt, a popular woman comedian who used to pad herself out and speak in a deep bass voice.

Brecht's first full-length play, Baal (written 1918), arose in response to an argument in one of Kutscher's drama seminars, initiating a trend that persisted throughout his career of creative activity that was generated by a desire to counter another work (both others' and his own, as his many adaptations and re-writes attest). "Anyone can be creative," he quipped, "it's rewriting other people that's a challenge." Brecht completed his second major play, Drums in the Night, in February 1919.

Between November 1921 and April 1922 Brecht made acquaintance with many influential people in the Berlin cultural scene. Amongst them was the playwright Arnolt Bronnen with whom he established a joint venture, the Arnolt Bronnen / Bertolt Brecht Company. Brecht changed the spelling of his first name to Bertolt to rhyme with Arnolt.

In 1922 while still living in Munich, Brecht came to the attention of an influential Berlin critic, Herbert Ihering: "At 24 the writer Bert Brecht has changed Germany's literary complexion overnight"—he enthused in his review of Brecht's first play to be produced, Drums in the Night—"[he] has given our time a new tone, a new melody, a new vision. [...] It is a language you can feel on your tongue, in your gums, your ear, your spinal column." In November it was announced that Brecht had been awarded the prestigious Kleist Prize (intended for unestablished writers and probably Germany's most significant literary award, until it was abolished in 1932) for his first three plays (Baal, Drums in the Night, and In the Jungle, although at that point only Drums had been produced). The citation for the award insisted that: "[Brecht's] language is vivid without being deliberately poetic, symbolical without being over literary. Brecht is a dramatist because his language is felt physically and in the round." That year he married the Viennese opera singer Marianne Zoff. Their daughter, Hanne Hiob, born in March 1923, was a successful German actress.

In 1923, Brecht wrote a scenario for what was to become a short slapstick film, Mysteries of a Barbershop, directed by Erich Engel and starring Karl Valentin. Despite a lack of success at the time, its experimental inventiveness and the subsequent success of many of its contributors have meant that it is now considered one of the most important films in German film history. In May of that year, Brecht's In the Jungle premiered in Munich, also directed by Engel. Opening night proved to be a "scandal"—a phenomenon that would characterize many of his later productions during the Weimar Republic—in which Nazis blew whistles and threw stink bombs at the actors on the stage.

In 1924 Brecht worked with the novelist and playwright Lion Feuchtwanger (whom he had met in 1919) on an adaptation of Christopher Marlowe's Edward II that proved to be a milestone in Brecht's early theatrical and dramaturgical development. Brecht's Edward II constituted his first attempt at collaborative writing and was the first of many classic texts he was to adapt. As his first solo directorial début, he later credited it as the germ of his conception of "epic theatre". That September, a job as assistant dramaturg at Max Reinhardt's Deutsches Theater—at the time one of the leading three or four theatres in the world—brought him to Berlin.

=== Weimar Republic Berlin (1925–1933) ===
In 1923 Brecht's marriage to Zoff began to break down (though they did not divorce until 1927). Brecht had become involved both with Elisabeth Hauptmann and with Helene Weigel. Brecht and Weigel's son, Stefan, was born in October 1924.

In his role as dramaturg, Brecht had much to stimulate him but little work of his own. Reinhardt staged Shaw's Saint Joan, Goldoni's Servant of Two Masters (with the improvisational approach of the commedia dell'arte in which the actors chatted with the prompter about their roles), and Pirandello's Six Characters in Search of an Author in his group of Berlin theatres. A new version of Brecht's third play, now entitled Jungle: Decline of a Family, opened at the Deutsches Theater in October 1924, but was not a success.

In the asphalt city I'm at home. From the very start
Provided with every last sacrament:
With newspapers. And tobacco. And brandy
To the end mistrustful, lazy and content.

— Bertolt Brecht, "Of Poor BB"

At this time Brecht revised his important "transitional poem", "Of Poor BB". In 1925, his publishers provided him with Elisabeth Hauptmann as an assistant for the completion of his collection of poems, Devotions for the Home (Hauspostille, eventually published in January 1927). She continued to work with him after the publisher's commission ran out.

In 1925 in Mannheim the artistic exhibition Neue Sachlichkeit ("New Objectivity") had given its name to the new post-Expressionist movement in the German arts. With little to do at the Deutsches Theater, Brecht began to develop his Man Equals Man project, which was to become the first product of "the 'Brecht collective'—that shifting group of friends and collaborators on whom he henceforward depended". This collaborative approach to artistic production, together with aspects of Brecht's writing and style of theatrical production, mark Brecht's work from this period as part of the Neue Sachlichkeit movement. The collective's work "mirrored the artistic climate of the middle 1920s", Willett and Manheim argue:

with their attitude of Neue Sachlichkeit (or New Matter-of-Factness), their stressing of the collectivity and downplaying of the individual, and their new cult of Anglo-Saxon imagery and sport. Together the "collective" would go to fights, not only absorbing their terminology and ethos (which permeates Man Equals Man) but also drawing those conclusions for the theatre as a whole which Brecht set down in his theoretical essay "Emphasis on Sport" and tried to realise by means of the harsh lighting, the boxing-ring stage and other anti-illusionistic devices that henceforward appeared in his own productions.

In 1925, Brecht saw two films which influenced him significantly: Chaplin's The Gold Rush and Eisenstein's Battleship Potemkin. Brecht had compared Valentin to Chaplin, and the two of them provided models for Galy Gay in Man Equals Man. Brecht later wrote that Chaplin "would in many ways come closer to the epic than to the dramatic theatre's requirements". The two men met several times during Brecht's stay in the United States, and discussed Chaplin's Monsieur Verdoux project, which it is possible Brecht influenced.

In 1926 a series of short stories was published under Brecht's name, though Hauptmann was closely associated with writing them. Following the production of Man Equals Man in Darmstadt that year, Brecht began studying Marxism and socialism in earnest, under the supervision of Hauptmann. "When I read Marx's Capital", a note by Brecht reveals, "I understood my plays." Marx was, it continues, "the only spectator for my plays I'd ever come across." Inspired by developments in the USSR, Brecht wrote a number of agitprop plays, praising the bolshevik collectivism (replaceability of each member of the collective in Man Equals Man) and the Red Terror (The Decision).

For us, man portrayed on the stage is significant as a social function. It is not his relationship to himself, nor his relationship to God, but his relationship to society which is central. Whenever he appears, his class or social stratum appears with him. His moral, spiritual or sexual conflicts are conflicts with society.

— Erwin Piscator, 1929.

In 1927 Brecht became part of the "dramaturgical collective" of Erwin Piscator's first company, which was designed to tackle the problem of finding new plays for the group's "epic, political, confrontational, documentary theatre". Brecht collaborated with Piscator during the period of the latter's landmark productions, Hoppla, We're Alive! (September 1927) by Toller, Rasputin (November 1927), The Adventures of the Good Soldier Schweik (January 1928), and Konjunktur (April 1928) by Lania. Brecht's most significant contribution was to the adaptation of Jaroslav Hašek's unfinished episodic comic novel Schweik (1921-1923), which he later described as a "montage from the novel". The Piscator productions influenced Brecht's ideas about staging and design, and alerted him to the radical potentials offered to the "epic" playwright by the development of stage technology (particularly projections). What Brecht took from Piscator "is fairly plain, and he acknowledged it" Willett suggests:

The emphasis on Reason and didacticism, the sense that the new subject matter demanded a new dramatic form, the use of songs to interrupt and comment: all these are found in his notes and essays of the 1920s, and he bolstered them by citing such Piscatorial examples as the step-by-step narrative technique of Schweik and the oil interests handled in Konjunktur ('Petroleum resists the five-act form').

Brecht was struggling at the time with the question of how to dramatize the complex economic relationships of modern capitalism in his unfinished project Joe P. Fleischhacker (which Piscator's theatre announced in its programme for the 1927–28 season). It wasn't until his Saint Joan of the Stockyards (written between 1929 and 1931) that Brecht solved the problem. In 1928 he discussed with Piscator plans to stage Shakespeare's Julius Caesar and Brecht's own Drums in the Night, but the productions did not materialize.

The year 1927 also saw the first collaboration between Brecht and the young composer Kurt Weill (1900-1950). Together they began to develop Brecht's Mahagonny project, along thematic lines of the biblical Cities of the Plain but rendered in terms of the Neue Sachlichkeit's Amerikanismus, which had informed Brecht's previous work. They produced The Little Mahagonny for a music festival in July, as what Weill called a "stylistic exercise" in preparation for the large-scale piece. From that point on Caspar Neher became an integral part of the collaborative effort, with words, music and visuals conceived in relation to one another from the start. The model for their mutual articulation lay in Brecht's newly formulated principle of the "separation of the elements", which he first outlined in the theoretical notes "The Modern Theatre Is the Epic Theatre" (1930). The principle, a variety of montage, proposed by-passing the "great struggle for supremacy between words, music and production" (as Brecht put it) by showing each as self-contained, independent works of art that adopt attitudes towards one another.

In 1930 Brecht married Weigel; their daughter Barbara Brecht was born soon after the wedding. She also became an actress and would later share the copyrights of Brecht's work with her siblings.

Brecht formed a writing-collective which became prolific and very influential. Elisabeth Hauptmann, Margarete Steffin, Emil Burri, Ruth Berlau and others worked with Brecht and produced the multiple teaching plays (German: Lehrstücke), which attempted to create a new dramaturgy for participants rather than for passive audiences. The teaching plays addressed themselves to the massive worker-arts organisation that existed in Germany and Austria in the 1920s. So did Brecht's first great play, Saint Joan of the Stockyards, which attempts to portray the drama involved in financial transactions.

The collective adapted John Gay's The Beggar's Opera (1728), with Brecht's lyrics set to music by Kurt Weill. This work, The Threepenny Opera (German: Die Dreigroschenoper, 1928), became the biggest hit in Berlin of the 1920s and a renewing influence on the musical worldwide. One of The Threepenny Opera's most famous lines underscored the hypocrisy of conventional morality imposed by the Church, working in conjunction with the established order, in the face of working-class hunger and deprivation:

Erst kommt das Fressen
Dann kommt die Moral.

First the grub (lit. 'eating like animals, gorging')
Then the morality.

The success of The Threepenny Opera was followed by the quickly thrown-together Happy End (1929). It was a personal and a commercial failure. At the time the book was purported to be by the mysterious Dorothy Lane (now known to be Elisabeth Hauptmann, Brecht's secretary and close collaborator). Brecht only claimed authorship of the song texts. Brecht would later use elements of Happy End as the germ for his Saint Joan of the Stockyards, a play that would never see the stage in Brecht's lifetime. Happy End's score by Weill produced many Brecht/Weill hits like "Der Bilbao-Song" and "Surabaya-Jonny".

The masterpiece of the Brecht/Weill collaborations, Rise and Fall of the City of Mahagonny (German: Aufstieg und Fall der Stadt Mahagonny), caused an uproar when it premiered in 1930 in Leipzig, with Nazis in the audience protesting. The Mahagonny opera would premiere later in Berlin in 1931 as a triumphant sensation.

Brecht spent the last years (1930–1933) of the Weimar-era in Berlin working with his "collective" on the Lehrstücke. These were a group of plays driven by morals, music and Brecht's budding epic theatre. The Lehrstücke often aimed at educating workers on socialist issues. The Measures Taken (German: Die Massnahme, 1930) was scored by Hanns Eisler. In addition, Brecht worked on a script for a semi-documentary feature-film about the human impact of mass unemployment, Kuhle Wampe (1932), which was directed by Slatan Dudow. This striking film is notable for its subversive humour, outstanding cinematography by Günther Krampf, and Hanns Eisler's dynamic musical contribution. It still provides a vivid insight into Berlin during the last years of the Weimar Republic.

=== California and World War II (1933–1945) ===
Unhappy the land where heroes are needed.

— Galileo, in Brecht's Life of Galileo (1943)

Fearing persecution, Brecht fled Nazi Germany in February 1933, just after Hitler took power. Following brief spells in Prague, Zurich and Paris, he and Weigel accepted an invitation from journalist and author Karin Michaëlis to move to Denmark. The Brechts first stayed with Michaëlis at her house on the small island of Thurø close to the island of Funen. They later bought their own house in Svendborg on Funen. This Svendborg house at Skovsbo Strand 8 became the Brecht family residence for the next six years. They often received guests there including Walter Benjamin, Hanns Eisler and Ruth Berlau. Brecht also travelled frequently to Copenhagen, Paris, Moscow, New York and London for various projects and collaborations.

When war seemed imminent in April 1939, he moved to Stockholm, where he remained for a year. After Germany invaded Norway and Denmark, Brecht left Sweden for Helsinki, Finland, where he awaited a pending visa to the United States. During this time he co-wrote the play Mr Puntila and His Man Matti (Herr Puntila und sein Knecht Matti) with Hella Wuolijoki, with whom he lived in the Marlebäck manor house in Iitti.

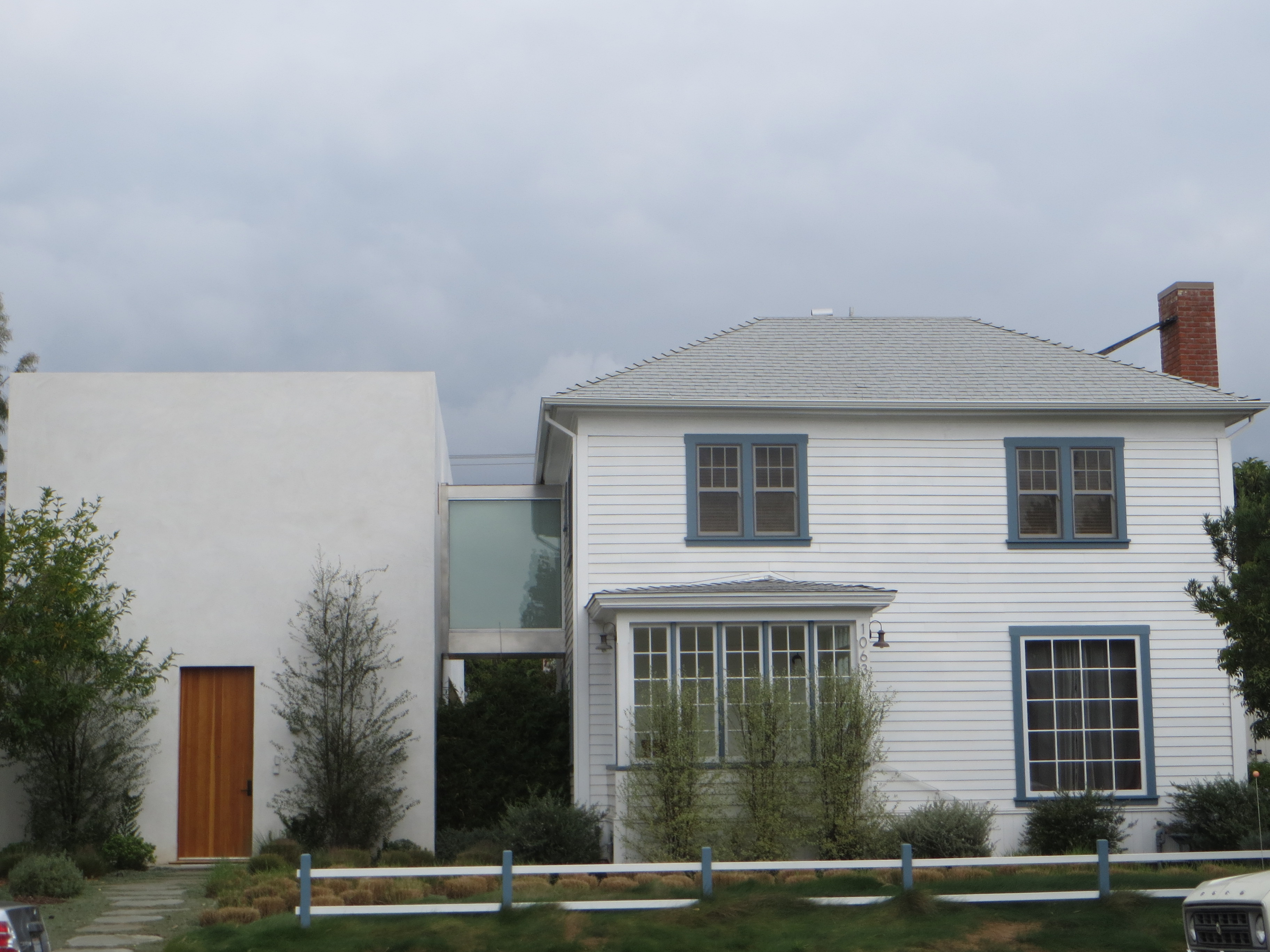
Brecht's house in Santa Monica, 1063 26th Street (2014)

Upon receipt of the U.S. visa in May 1941, the Brecht family relocated to Southern California. To get there, they took the Trans-Siberian Railway and a freighter from Vladivostok via Manila to the US. They then rented a two-story home in the Los Angeles beach suburb of Santa Monica. By the late 1930s, the West Side of Los Angeles had become a thriving expatriate colony of European intellectuals and artists. Because the colony included so many writers, directors, actors, and composers from German-speaking countries, it has been referred to as "Weimar on the Pacific".

At the center of the émigré community was Brecht's old friend Salka Viertel, whom he had known in the Berlin theatre world of the 1920s. From her house in Santa Monica Canyon, Viertel hosted frequent tea parties and salons where European intellectuals could mingle with Hollywood luminaries. Brecht first met actor Charles Laughton at a Viertel party, and it led to the two men collaborating on the English-language version of Life of Galileo.

Although Brecht was not enamored of life in the movie capital, he worked hard to find a place for himself as a screenwriter. He co-wrote the screenplay for the Fritz Lang-directed film Hangmen Also Die! (1943) which was loosely based on the 1942 assassination of Reinhard Heydrich, the Nazi Deputy Reich Protector of the German-occupied Protectorate of Bohemia and Moravia. Heydrich had been Heinrich Himmler's right-hand man in the SS and a chief architect of the Holocaust; he was known as "The Hangman of Prague" (German: der Henker von Prag). For this film, Brecht's fellow expatriate, composer Hanns Eisler, was nominated for an Academy Award in the category of Best Music Score. The fact that three refugee artists from Nazi Germany – Lang, Brecht and Eisler – collaborated to make the film exemplified the influence this generation of German exiles had on American culture. Hangmen Also Die! turned out to be Brecht's only script that became a Hollywood film. The money he earned from selling the script enabled him to write The Visions of Simone Machard, Schweik in the Second World War and an adaptation of Webster's The Duchess of Malfi.

During the reign of the Third Reich, Brecht was a prominent practitioner of the Exilliteratur. He expressed his opposition to the National Socialist and Fascist movements in his famous plays: Life of Galileo, Mother Courage and Her Children, The Good Person of Szechwan, The Resistible Rise of Arturo Ui, The Caucasian Chalk Circle, Fear and Misery of the Third Reich, and many others. However, his refusal to speak in support of Carola Neher, who died in the Gulag after being arrested during Joseph Stalin's Great Purge, was harshly criticised by Russian émigrés living in the West.

=== Cold War and final years in East Germany (1945–1956) ===
At the onset of the Cold War and "Second Red Scare" in the U.S., Brecht was blacklisted by movie studio bosses and investigated by the House Un-American Activities Committee (HUAC). Along with more than 40 other Hollywood writers, directors, actors and producers, he was subpoenaed in September 1947 by the HUAC. Although he was one of the 19 "unfriendly" witnesses who had declared ahead of time they would not cooperate with the House investigation, Brecht eventually decided to go before the committee and answer questions. He later explained he was following the advice of attorneys and did not want to delay his planned trip to Europe.

On 30 October 1947, Brecht testified to the HUAC that he had never been a member of the Communist Party. He made wry jokes throughout the proceedings, punctuating his inability to speak English well with continuous references to the translators present, who transformed his German statements into English ones unintelligible to himself. It was noted that his interpreter, David Baumgardt, had a heavy German accent which made him more difficult to understand than Brecht himself. With the chairman of the committee, J. Parnell Thomas, complaining that he "cannot understand the interpreter any more than I can the witness.". HUAC vice-chairman Karl Mundt thanked Brecht for his cooperation. The remaining unfriendly witnesses who appeared before the HUAC at that time, the so-called Hollywood Ten, declined on First Amendment grounds to answer about their Communist Party affiliations and were cited for contempt. Brecht's decision to be a "cooperative" witness—albeit in an evasive way and providing no useful information—led to criticism of him, including accusations of betrayal. The day after his testimony, Brecht fled to Europe and never returned to the U.S.

He lived in Zurich, Switzerland, for a year. In February 1948 in the Swiss town of Chur, Brecht staged an adaptation of Sophocles' Antigone, based on a translation by Hölderlin. The play was published under the title Antigonemodell 1948, accompanied by an essay on the importance of creating a "non-Aristotelian" form of theatre.

In 1949 he moved to East Berlin and established his theatre company there, the Berliner Ensemble. He retained Austrian nationality which was granted in 1950, and his overseas bank accounts from which he received valuable hard currency remittances. The copyrights on his writings were held by a Swiss company.

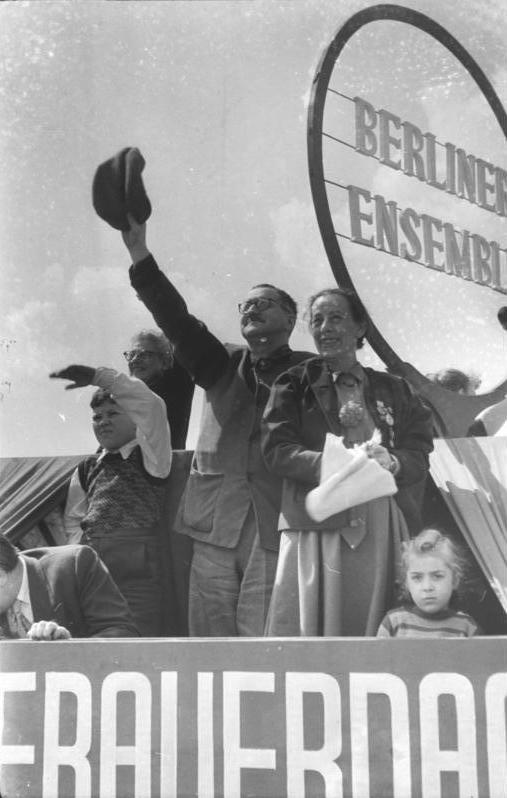
Brecht and Weigel on the roof of the Berliner Ensemble during the International Workers' Day demonstrations in 1954

Though he was never a member of the Communist Party, Brecht had been schooled in Marxism by the dissident communist Karl Korsch. Korsch's version of the Marxist dialectic influenced Brecht greatly, both his aesthetic theory and theatrical practice. Brecht received the Stalin Peace Prize in 1954. His proximity to Marxist thought made him controversial in Austria, where his plays were boycotted by directors and not performed for more than ten years.

Brecht wrote very few plays in his final years in East Berlin, none of them as famous as his previous works. He dedicated himself to directing plays and developing the talents of the next generation of young directors and dramaturgs, such as Manfred Wekwerth, Benno Besson and Carl Weber. At this time he wrote some of his most celebrated poems, including the Buckow Elegies.

At first, Brecht apparently supported the measures taken by the East German government against the East German uprising of 1953, which included the use of Soviet military force. In a letter from the day of the uprising to SED First Secretary Walter Ulbricht, Brecht wrote: "History will pay its respects to the revolutionary impatience of the Socialist Unity Party of Germany. The great discussion [exchange] with the masses about the speed of socialist construction will lead to a viewing and safeguarding of the socialist achievements. At this moment I must assure you of my allegiance to the Socialist Unity Party of Germany."

Brecht's subsequent commentary on those events, however, offered a very different assessment. In one of the poems in the Elegies, "Die Lösung" (The Solution), a disillusioned Brecht wrote a few months later:

After the uprising of the 17th of June
The Secretary of the Writers Union
Had leaflets distributed in the Stalinallee
Stating that the people
Had forfeited the confidence of the government
And could win it back only
By increased work quotas.

Would it not be easier
In that case for the government
To dissolve the people
And elect another?

Brecht's involvement in agitprop and his lack of clear condemnation of purges resulted in criticism from many contemporaries who became disillusioned with communism earlier. Fritz Raddatz, who knew Brecht for a long time, described his friend's attitude as "broken", "escaping the problem of Stalinism", ignoring his friends being murdered in the USSR, and keeping silent during show trials such as the Slánský trial.

After Khrushchev's "Secret Speech"—the report read on the 20th Congress of the CPSU, which brought the crimes of Stalinism to the public—Brecht wrote poems critical of Stalin and his cult, unpublished during Brecht's lifetime. In the best-known of them, "The Tsar Spoke to Them" (Der Zar hat mit ihnen gesprochen), Brecht mocked the epithets applied to Stalin as "the honoured murderer of the people" and compared his state terror policies with the ones of the Russian Tsar Nicholas II, famous for violent suppression of a peaceful demonstration on "Bloody Sunday" and later protests which resulted in the Russian Revolution of 1905.

the sun of the peoples burned its worshippers.
...
when young he was conscientious
when old he was cruel
young
he was not god
who becomes god
becomes dumb.

=== Death ===
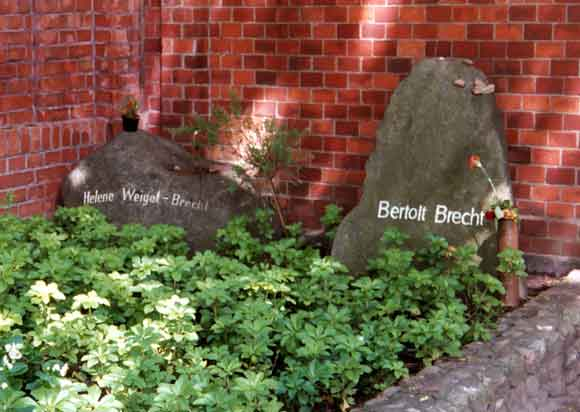
Graves of Helene Weigel and Bertolt Brecht in the Dorotheenstadt Cemetery

Brecht died on 14 August 1956 of a heart attack at the age of 58. He is buried in the Dorotheenstadt Cemetery on Chausseestraße in the Mitte neighbourhood of Berlin, overlooked by the residence he shared with Helene Weigel.

According to Stephen Parker, who reviewed Brecht's writings and unpublished medical records, Brecht contracted rheumatic fever as a child, which led to an enlarged heart, followed by life-long chronic heart failure and Sydenham's chorea. A report of a radiograph taken of Brecht in 1951 describes a badly diseased heart, enlarged to the left with a protruding aortic knob and with seriously impaired pumping. Brecht's colleagues characterized him as being very nervous, and sometimes shaking his head or moving his hands erratically. This can be reasonably attributed to Sydenham's chorea, which is also associated with emotional lability, personality changes, obsessive-compulsive behavior, and hyperactivity, which matched Brecht's behavior. "What is remarkable," wrote Parker, "is his capacity to turn abject physical weakness into peerless artistic strength, arrhythmia into the rhythms of poetry, chorea into the choreography of drama."

== Theory and practice of theatre ==
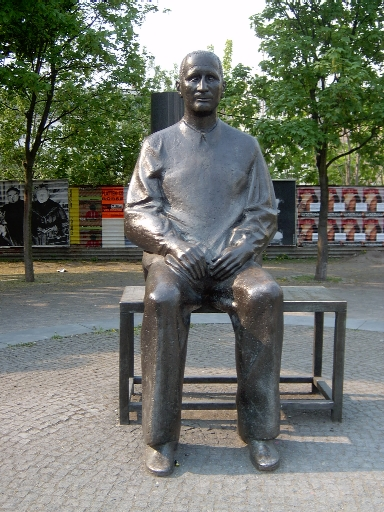
Statue of Brecht outside the Berliner Ensemble's theatre in Berlin

Brecht developed the combined theory and practice of his epic theatre movement by synthesizing and extending the experiments of Erwin Piscator and Vsevolod Meyerhold to explore the theatre as a forum for political ideas and the creation of a critical aesthetics of dialectical materialism.

Epic Theatre proposed that a play should not cause the spectator to identify emotionally with the characters or action before him or her, but should instead provoke rational self-reflection and a critical view of the action on the stage. Brecht thought that the experience of a climactic catharsis of emotion left an audience complacent. Instead, he wanted his audiences to adopt a critical perspective in order to recognize social injustice and exploitation and to be moved to go forth from the theatre and effect change in the world outside. For this purpose, Brecht employed the use of techniques that remind the spectator that the play is a representation of reality and not reality itself. By highlighting the constructed nature of the theatrical event, Brecht hoped to communicate that the audience's reality was equally constructed, and as such, was changeable.

Brecht's modernist concern with drama-as-a-medium led to his refinement of the "epic form" of the drama. This dramatic form is related to similar modernist innovations in other arts, including the strategy of divergent chapters in James Joyce's novel Ulysses, Sergei Eisenstein's evolution of a constructivist "montage" in the cinema, and Picasso's introduction of cubist "collage" in the visual arts.

One of Brecht's most important principles was what he called the Verfremdungseffekt (translated as "defamiliarization effect", "distancing effect", or "estrangement effect", and often mistranslated as "alienation effect"). This involved, Brecht wrote, "stripping the event of its self-evident, familiar, obvious quality and creating a sense of astonishment and curiosity about them". To this end, Brecht employed techniques such as the actor's direct address to the audience, harsh and bright stage lighting, the use of songs to interrupt the action, explanatory placards, the transposition of text to the third person or past tense in rehearsals, and speaking the stage directions out loud. This theory was, however, not formalised until later in Brecht's dramatic career.

In contrast to many other avant-garde approaches, however, Brecht had no desire to destroy art as an institution; rather, he hoped to "re-function" the theatre to a new social use. In this regard he was a vital participant in the aesthetic debates of his era—particularly over the "high art/popular culture" dichotomy—vying with the likes of Theodor W. Adorno, György Lukács, Ernst Bloch, and developing a close friendship with Walter Benjamin. Brechtian theatre articulated popular themes and forms with avant-garde formal experimentation to create a modernist realism that stood in sharp contrast both to its psychological and socialist varieties. "Brecht's work is the most important and original in European drama since Ibsen and Strindberg," Raymond Williams argues, while Peter Bürger dubs him "the most important materialist writer of our time."

Brecht was also influenced by Chinese theatre, and used its aesthetic as an argument for Verfremdungseffekt. Brecht believed, "Traditional Chinese acting also knows the alienation [sic] effect, and applies it most subtly. The [Chinese] performer portrays incidents of utmost passion, but without his delivery becoming heated." Brecht attended a Chinese opera performance and was introduced to the famous Chinese opera performer Mei Lanfang in 1935. However, Brecht was sure to distinguish between Epic and Chinese theatre. He recognized that the Chinese style was not a "transportable piece of technique", and that epic theatre sought to historicize and address social and political issues.

Brecht used his poetry to criticize European culture, including Nazis, and the German bourgeoisie. Brecht's poetry is marked by the effects of the First and Second World Wars.

Throughout his theatric production, poems are incorporated into his plays with music. In 1951, Brecht issued a recantation of his apparent suppression of poetry in his plays with a note titled On Poetry and Virtuosity. He writes:

We shall not need to speak of a play's poetry ... something that seemed relatively unimportant in the immediate past. It seemed not only unimportant, but misleading, and the reason was not that the poetic element had been sufficiently developed and observed, but that reality had been tampered with in its name ... we had to speak of a truth as distinct from poetry ... we have given up examining works of art from their poetic or artistic aspect, and got satisfaction from theatrical works that have no sort of poetic appeal ... Such works and performances may have some effect, but it can hardly be a profound one, not even politically. For it is a peculiarity of the theatrical medium that it communicates awarenesses and impulses in the form of pleasure: the depth of the pleasure and the impulse will correspond to the depth of the pleasure.

== Legacy ==
Brecht's widow, the actress Helene Weigel, continued to manage the Berliner Ensemble until her death in 1971. The theatre company was primarily devoted to performing Brecht's plays. His plays were a focus of the Schauspiel Frankfurt when Harry Buckwitz was general manager, including the world premiere of Die Gesichte der Simone Machard in 1957.

Brecht's son, Stefan Brecht, became a poet and theatre critic interested in New York's avant-garde theatre, and was pivotal in the development of "queer theatre", on which he wrote a book in 1978.

Besides being a prominent dramatist and poet, Bertolt Brecht has also been cited by scholars for making significant original contributions to social and political philosophy.

The aesthetic theories of Brecht had a major influence on radical cinema in the 1960s and 1970s. Jean-Luc Godard, Alexandre Kluge, Rainer Werner Fassbinder, Nagisa Ōshima and Jean-Marie Straub and Danielle Huillet are often cited as the principal exponents of "Brechtian cinema".

Brecht's collaborations with Kurt Weill influenced the evolution of rock. The "Alabama Song" for example, originally published as a poem in Brecht's Hauspostille (1927) and set to music by Weill in Mahagonny, was recorded by The Doors on their self-titled debut album, as well as by David Bowie and various other bands and soloists since the 1960s. In his memoir, Bob Dylan wrote about the huge impact that "Pirate Jenny" from The Threepenny Opera had on him. He first heard the song in a New York theatrical show that featured compositions by Brecht and Weill. At the time, Dylan was performing traditional folk music and had barely ventured into his own songwriting. But the "outrageous power" of "Pirate Jenny" was an epiphany which prompted him to start experimenting with the storytelling possibilities of song.

== Collaborators and associates ==
Collective and collaborative working methods were inherent to Brecht's approach, as Fredric Jameson (among others) stresses. Jameson describes the creator of the work not as Brecht the individual, but rather as 'Brecht': a collective subject that "certainly seemed to have a distinctive style (the one we now call 'Brechtian') but was no longer personal in the bourgeois or individualistic sense." During the course of his career, Brecht sustained many long-lasting creative relationships with other writers, composers, scenographers, directors, dramaturgs and actors; the list includes: Elisabeth Hauptmann, Helene Weigel, Margarete Steffin, Ruth Berlau, Slatan Dudow, Kurt Weill, Hanns Eisler, Paul Dessau, Caspar Neher, Teo Otto, Karl von Appen, Ernst Busch, Lotte Lenya, Peter Lorre, Therese Giehse, Angelika Hurwicz, Carola Neher and Charles Laughton. This is "theatre as collective experiment [...] as something radically different from theatre as expression or as experience."

=== List of collaborators and associates ===
- Karl von Appen
- Walter Benjamin
- Eric Bentley
- Ruth Berghaus
- Ruth Berlau
- Berliner Ensemble
- Benno Besson
- Arnolt Bronnen
- Emil Burri
- Ernst Busch
- Paul Dessau
- Slatan Dudow
- Hanns Eisler
- Erich Engel
- Erwin Faber
- Lion Feuchtwanger
- Therese Giehse
- Alexander Granach
- Elisabeth Hauptmann
- John Heartfield
- Paul Hindemith
- Oscar Homolka
- Angelika Hurwicz
- Herbert Ihering
- Fritz Kortner
- Fritz Lang
- Wolfgang Langhoff
- Charles Laughton
- Lotte Lenya
- Theo Lingen
- Peter Lorre
- Joseph Losey
- Ralph Manheim
- Carola Neher
- Caspar Neher
- Teo Otto
- G. W. Pabst
- Erwin Piscator
- Lotte Reiniger
- Margarete Steffin
- Salka Viertel
- Carl Weber
- Helene Weigel
- Kurt Weill
- John Willett
- Hella Wuolijoki

== Works ==
=== Fiction ===
- Stories of Mr. Keuner (Geschichten vom Herrn Keuner)
- Threepenny Novel (Dreigroschenroman, 1934)
- The Business Affairs of Mr. Julius Caesar (Die Geschäfte des Herrn Julius Caesar, 1937–39, unfinished, published 1957)
- Tales from the Calendar (short-story collection)
- "The Job", alternate title "By The Sweat of Thy Brow Shalt Thou Fail to Earn Thy Bread"

=== Plays and screenplays ===
Entries show: English-language translation of title (German-language title) [year written] / [year first produced]

- Baal 1918/1923
- Drums in the Night (Trommeln in der Nacht) 1918–20/1922
- The Beggar (Der Bettler oder Der tote Hund) 1919/?
- A Respectable Wedding (Die Kleinbürgerhochzeit) 1919/1926
- Driving Out a Devil (Er treibt einen Teufel aus) 1919/?
- Light in the Darkness (Lux in Tenebris) 1919/?
- The Catch (Der Fischzug) 1919?/?
- Mysteries of a Barbershop (Mysterien eines Friseursalons) (screenplay) 1923
- In the Jungle of Cities (Im Dickicht der Städte) 1921–24/1923
- The Life of Edward II of England (Leben Eduards des Zweiten von England) 1924/1924
- Downfall of the Egotist Johann Fatzer (Der Untergang des Egoisten Johnann Fatzer) (fragments) 1926–30/1974
- Man Equals Man also A Man's A Man (Mann ist Mann) 1924–26/1926
- The Elephant Calf (Das Elefantenkalb) 1924–26/1926
- Little Mahagonny (Mahagonny-Songspiel) 1927/1927
- The Threepenny Opera (Die Dreigroschenoper) 1928/1928
- The Flight Across the Ocean (Der Ozeanflug); originally Lindbergh's Flight (Lindberghflug) 1928–29/1929
- The Baden-Baden Lesson on Consent (Badener Lehrstück vom Einverständnis) 1929/1929
- Happy End (Happy End) 1929/1929
- The Rise and Fall of the City of Mahagonny (Aufstieg und Fall der Stadt Mahagonny) 1927–29/1930
- He Said Yes / He Said No (Der Jasager; Der Neinsager) 1929–30/1930–?
- The Decision/The Measures Taken (Die Maßnahme) 1930/1930
- Saint Joan of the Stockyards (Die heilige Johanna der Schlachthöfe) 1929–31/1959
- The Exception and the Rule (Die Ausnahme und die Regel) 1930/1938
- The Mother (Die Mutter) 1930–31/1932
- Kuhle Wampe (screenplay, with Ernst Ottwalt) 1931/1932
- The Seven Deadly Sins (Die sieben Todsünden der Kleinbürger) 1933/1933
- Round Heads and Pointed Heads (Die Rundköpfe und die Spitzköpfe) 1931–34/1936
- The Horatians and the Curiatians (Die Horatier und die Kuriatier) 1933–34/1958
- Fear and Misery of the Third Reich (Furcht und Elend des Dritten Reiches) 1935–38/1938
- Señora Carrar's Rifles (Die Gewehre der Frau Carrar) 1937/1937
- Life of Galileo (Leben des Galilei) 1937–39/1943
- How Much Is Your Iron? (Was kostet das Eisen?) 1939/1939
- Dansen (Dansen) 1939/?
- Mother Courage and Her Children (Mutter Courage und ihre Kinder) 1938–39/1941
- The Trial of Lucullus (Das Verhör des Lukullus) 1938–39/1940
- The Judith of Shimoda (Die Judith von Shimoda) 1940
- Mr Puntila and His Man Matti (Herr Puntila und sein Knecht Matti) 1940/1948
- The Good Person of Szechwan (Der gute Mensch von Sezuan) 1939–42/1943
- The Resistible Rise of Arturo Ui (Der aufhaltsame Aufstieg des Arturo Ui) 1941/1958
- Hangmen Also Die! (credited as Bert Brecht) (screenplay) 1942/1943
- The Visions of Simone Machard (Die Gesichte der Simone Machard) 1942–43/1957
- The Duchess of Malfi 1943/1943
- Schweik in the Second World War (Schweyk im Zweiten Weltkrieg) 1941–43/1957
- The Caucasian Chalk Circle (Der kaukasische Kreidekreis) 1943–45/1948
- Antigone (Die Antigone des Sophokles) 1947/1948
- The Days of the Commune (Die Tage der Commune) 1948–49/1956
- The Tutor (Der Hofmeister) 1950/1950
- The Condemnation of Lucullus (Die Verurteilung des Lukullus) 1938–39/1951
- Report from Herrnburg (Herrnburger Bericht) 1951/1951
- Coriolanus (Coriolan) 1951–53/1962
- The Trial of Joan of Arc at Rouen, 1431 (Der Prozess der Jeanne D'Arc zu Rouen, 1431) 1952/1952
- Turandot (Turandot oder Der Kongreß der Weißwäscher) 1953–54/1969
- Don Juan (Don Juan) 1952/1954
- Trumpets and Drums (Pauken und Trompeten) 1955/1955

=== Theoretical works ===
- The Modern Theatre Is the Epic Theatre (1930)
- The Threepenny Lawsuit (Der Dreigroschenprozess) (written 1931; published 1932)
- The Book of Changes (fragment also known as Me-Ti; written 1935–1939)
- The Street Scene (written 1938; published 1950)
- The Popular and the Realistic (written 1938; published 1958)
- Short Description of a New Technique of Acting which Produces an Alienation Effect (written 1940; published 1951)
- A Short Organum for the Theatre ("Kleines Organon für das Theater", written 1948; published 1949)
- The Messingkauf Dialogues (Dialoge aus dem Messingkauf, published 1963)

=== Poetry ===
Brecht wrote hundreds of poems throughout his life. He began writing poetry as a young boy, and his first poems were published in 1914. His poetry was influenced by folk-ballads, French chansons, and the poetry of Rimbaud and Villon. The last collection of new poetry by Brecht published in his lifetime was the 1939 Svendborger Gedichte.

Some of Brecht's poems

- 1940
- A Bad Time for Poetry
- Alabama Song
- Children's Crusade
- Kinderhymne (Children's Hymn)
- Contemplating Hell
- From a German War Primer
- Germany
- Honoured Murderer of the People
- How Fortunate the Man with None
- Hymn to Communism
- I Never Loved You More
- I Want to Go with the One I Love
- I'm Not Saying Anything Against Alexander
- In Praise of Communism
- In Praise of Doubt
- In Praise of Illegal Work
- In Praise of Learning
- In Praise of Study
- In Praise of the Work of the Party
- Legend of the Origin of the Book Tao-Te-Ching on Lao-Tsu's Road into Exile
- Mack the Knife
- Mary
- My Young Son Asks Me
- Not What Was Meant
- O Germany, Pale Mother!
- On Reading a Recent Greek Poet
- On the Critical Attitude
- Parting
- Fragen eines lesenden Arbeiters (Questions from a Worker Who Reads)
- Radio Poem
- Reminiscence of Marie A.
- Send Me a Leaf
- Solidaritätslied (Solidarity Song)
- Die Bücherverbrennung (The Book Burning, about the Nazi book burnings)
- The Exile of the Poets
- The Invincible Inscription
- The Mask of Evil
- The Sixteen-Year-Old Seamstress Emma Ries before the Magistrate
- Die Lösung (The Solution)
- To Be Read in the Morning and at Night
- To Posterity
- To the Students and Workers of the Peasants' Faculty
- An die Nachgeborenen (To Those Born After)
- Einheitsfrontlied (United Front Song)
- War Has Been Given a Bad Name
- What Has Happened?

== See also ==
- Bertolt-Brecht-Literaturpreis
- Brecht Forum
- Ernst Josef Aufricht
- List of refugees
- Weimar culture
- Western Marxism

== Primary sources ==
=== Essays, diaries, and journals ===
- Brecht, Bertolt. 1964. Brecht on Theatre: The Development of an Aesthetic. Ed. and trans. John Willett. British edition. London: Methuen. ISBN 0-413-38800-X. USA edition. New York: Hill and Wang. ISBN 0-8090-3100-0.
- Brecht, Bertolt (1965). Messingkauf Dialogues. Translated by John Willett. London: Methuen. ISBN 0-413-38890-5.
- Willett, John, ed. (1990). Letters 1913–1956. Translated by Ralph Manheim. London: Methuen. ISBN 0-413-51050-6.

=== Drama, poetry, and prose ===
- Seven Plays by Bertolt Brecht, 1961. Ed. Eric Bentley. New York: Grove Press. In the Swamp, A Man's A Man, Saint Joan of the Stockyards, Mother Courage, Galileo, The Good Woman of Setzuan, The Caucasian Chalk Circle. OCLC 294759
- Brecht, Bertolt. 1994a. Collected Plays: One. Ed. John Willett and Ralph Manheim. Bertolt Brecht: Plays, Poetry, Prose. London: Methuen. Baal, Drums in the Night, In the Jungle of Cities, The Life of Edward II in England, and Five One-Act Plays. ISBN 0-413-68570-5.
- 1994b. Collected Plays: Two. Ed. John Willett and Ralph Manheim. London: Methuen. Man Equals Man, the Elephant Calf, The Threepenny Opera, The Rise and Fall of the City of Mahagonny, and The Seven Deadly Sins. ISBN 0-413-68560-8.
- 1997. Collected Plays: Three. Ed. John Willett. London: Methuen. St Joan of the Stockyards, the Mother, and Six Lehrstöcke (Lindbergh's Flight, The Baden-Baden Lesson on Consent, He Said Yes / He Said No, The Decision, The Exception and the Rule, and The Horatians and the Curiatians) ISBN 0-413-70460-2.
- 2003b. Collected Plays: Four. Ed. Tom Kuhn and John Willett. London: Methuen. Round heads and pointed heads, Dansen, How much is your iron?, The trial of Lucullus, Fear and misery of the Third Reich, and Señora Carrar's rifles ISBN 0-413-70470-X.
- 1995. Collected Plays: Five. Ed. John Willett and Ralph Manheim. London: Methuen. Life of Galileo and Mother Courage and Her Children ISBN 0-413-69970-6.
- 1994c. Collected Plays: Six. Ed. John Willett and Ralph Manheim. London: Methuen. The Good Person of Szechwan, The Resistible Rise of Arturo Ui, and Mr Puntila and His Man Matti ISBN 0-413-68580-2.
- 1994d. Collected Plays: Seven. Ed. John Willett and Ralph Manheim. London: Methuen. The Visions of Simone Machard, Schweyk in the Second World War, The Caucasian Chalk Circle, and The Duchess of Malfi ISBN 0-413-68590-X.
- 2004. Collected Plays: Eight. Ed. Tom Kuhn and David Constantine. London: Methuen. The Antigone of Sophocles, The Days of the Commune, and Turandot or the Whitewasher's Congress ISBN 0-413-77352-3.
- 1972. Collected Plays: Nine. Ed. John Willett and Ralph Manheim. New York: Vintage. The Tutor; Coriolanus; The Trial of Joan of Arc at Rouen, 1431; Don Juan; and Trumpets and Drums ISBN 0-394-71819-4.
- John Willett; Ralph Manheim, eds. (2000). Poems: 1913–1956. London: Methuen. ISBN 0-413-15210-3.
- 2019. The Collected Poems of Bertolt Brecht. Ed. Tom Kuhn and David Constantine. New York: Liveright Publishing. ISBN 9780871407672
- 1983. Short Stories: 1921–1946. Ed. John Willett and Ralph Manheim. Trans. Yvonne Kapp, Hugh Rorrison and Antony Tatlow. London and New York: Methuen. ISBN 0-413-52890-1.
- 2001. Stories of Mr. Keuner. Trans. Martin Chalmers. San Francisco: City Lights. ISBN 0-87286-383-2.

== Secondary sources ==
- Banham, Martin, ed. (1998). "Brecht, Bertolt". The Cambridge Guide to Theatre. Cambridge: Cambridge University Press. p. 129. ISBN 0-521-43437-8.
- Benjamin, Walter (1983). Understanding Brecht. Translated by Anna Bostock. London and New York: Verso. ISBN 0-902308-99-8.
- Brooker, Peter. "Key Words in Brecht's Theory and Practice of Theatre". In Thomson & Sacks (1994), pp. 185–200.
- Bürger, Peter (1984). Theory of the Avant-Garde. Theory and History of Literature Ser. 4. Translated by Michael Shaw. Minneapolis: University of Minnesota Press. ISBN 0-8166-1068-1.
- Culbert, David (March 1995). "Joseph Goebbels and his diaries". Historical Journal of Film, Radio and Television (review). 15 (1): 143–149. doi:10.1080/01439689500260091.
- Ewen, Frederic (1967). Bertolt Brecht: His Life, His Art and His Times (Citadel Press Book ed.). New York: Carol Publishing Group.
- Hayman, Ronald (1983). Brecht: A Biography. London: Weidenfeld & Nicolson. ISBN 0-297-78206-1.
- Jameson, Fredric (1998). Brecht and Method. London and New York: Verso. ISBN 1-85984-809-5.
- Kolocotroni, Vassiliki; Goldman, Jane; Taxidou, Olga, eds. (1998). Modernism: An Anthology of Sources and Documents. Edinburgh: Edinburgh University Press. ISBN 0-7486-0973-3.
- McDowell, W. Stuart (Winter 1977). "A Brecht-Valentin Production: Mysteries of a Barbershop". Performing Arts Journal. 1 (3): 2–14. doi:10.2307/3245245. JSTOR 3245245. S2CID 193991810.
- McDowell, W. Stuart (2000). "Acting Brecht: The Munich Years". In Carol Martin; Henry Bial (eds.). The Brecht Sourcebook. Worlds of Performance. London and New York: Routledge. pp. 71–83. ISBN 0-415-20043-1.
- Meech, Tony. "Brecht's Early Plays". In Thomson & Sacks (1994), pp. 43–55.
- Sacks, Glendyr. "A Brecht Calendar". In Thomson & Sacks (1994), pp. xvii–xxvii.
- Schechter, Joel. "Brecht's Clowns: Man is Man and After". In Thomson & Sacks (1994), pp. 68–78.
- Smith, Iris (1991). "Brecht and the Mothers of Epic Theater". Theatre Journal. 43 (43): 491–505. doi:10.2307/3207978. hdl:1808/16482. JSTOR 3207978.
- Taxidou, Olga (November 1995). "Crude Thinking: John Fuegi and Recent Brecht Criticism". New Theatre Quarterly. XI (44): 381–384. doi:10.1017/S0266464X00009350. S2CID 191590706.
- Thomson, Peter. "Brecht's Lives". In Thomson & Sacks (1994), pp. 22–39.
- Thomson, Peter; Sacks, Glendyr, eds. (1994). The Cambridge Companion to Brecht. Cambridge Companions to Literature. Cambridge: Cambridge University Press. ISBN 0-521-41446-6.
- Völker, Klaus (1976). Brecht: A Biography. Translated by John Nowell. New York: Seabury Press. Translation of Klaus Völker: Bertolt Brecht, Eine Biographie. Munich and Vienna: Carl Hanser Verlag. ISBN 0-8164-9344-8.
- Willett, John (1967). The Theatre of Bertolt Brecht: A Study from Eight Aspects (3rd revised ed.). London: Methuen. ISBN 0-413-34360-X.
- Willett, John (1978). Art and Politics in the Weimar Period: The New Sobriety 1917–1933. New York: Da Capo Press. ISBN 0-306-80724-6.
- Willett, John (1998). Brecht in Context: Comparative Approaches (revised ed.). London: Methuen. ISBN 0-413-72310-0.
- Willett, John; Manheim, Ralph, eds. (1970). "Introduction". Collected Plays: 'One' by Bertolt Brecht. Bertolt Brecht: Plays, Poetry and Prose. London: Methuen. pp. vii–xvii. ISBN 0-416-03280-X.
- Williams, Raymond (1993). Drama from Ibsen to Brecht. London: Hogarth. pp. 277–290. ISBN 0-7012-0793-0.
- Wright, Elizabeth (1989). Postmodern Brecht: A Re-Presentation. London and New York: Routledge. ISBN 0-415-02330-0.
