= Karl von Appen =

German stage designer (1900–1981)

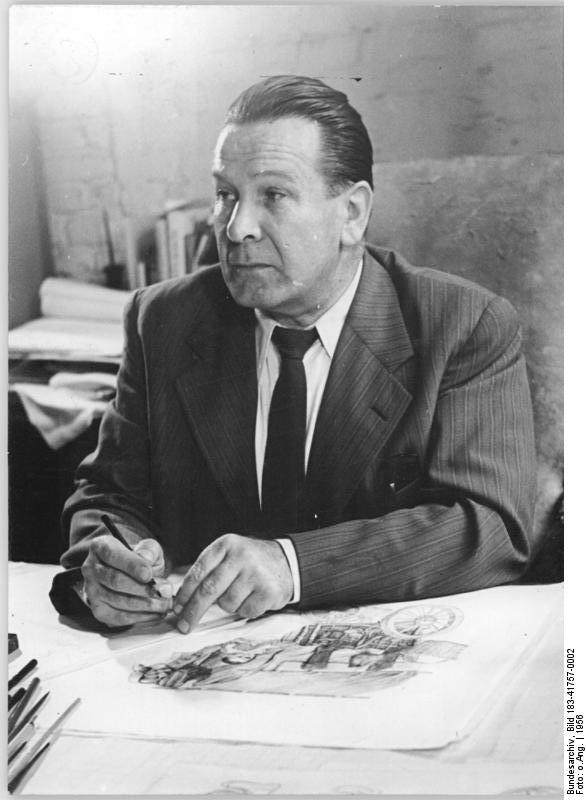
Karl von Appen in 1956.

Karl von Appen (12 May 1900, Düsseldorf – 22 August 1981, Berlin) was a German stage designer and member of the Association of Revolutionary Visual Artists.

== Theatre ==
- 1954: The Caucasian Chalk Circle by Bertolt Brecht; directed by Brecht at the Theater am Schiffbauerdamm in Berlin.
- 1958: The Resistible Rise of Arturo Ui by Bertolt Brecht; directed by Peter Palitzsch in Stuttgart.

== Sources ==
- Willett, John. 1967. The Theatre of Bertolt Brecht: A Study from Eight Aspects. Third rev. ed. London: Methuen, 1977. ISBN 0-413-34360-X.
