= Messingkauf Dialogues =

Messingkauf Dialogues Brecht's theoretical work

The Messingkauf Dialogues (German: Dialoge aus dem Messingkauf) is an incomplete theoretical work by the twentieth-century German theatre practitioner Bertolt Brecht. John Willett translates "Der Messingkauf" as "Buying Brass". According to a book from Brecht scholar Anthony Squiers, "Brecht worked on [the Messingkauf] primarily during the late 1930s and early 1940s. In Brecht’s words it contains, 'a lot of theory in dialog form.'"
