= The Horatians and the Curiatians =

Play by Bertolt Brecht

The Horatians and the Curiatians (German: Die Horatier und die Kuriatier) is a Lehrstück ("Schulstück" in the collected plays) by the German dramatist Bertolt Brecht written in collaboration with Margarete Steffin in 1933–34. It is a retelling of the story of the Horatii and Curiaces, a subject treated by Corneille (Horace) and subsequently by many opera composers (see Horatii). Commissioned by the Red Army, the play was printed in Moscow in 1936 but never performed until 1958, two years after Brecht's death. The two choruses are the main characters.

Brecht had initially planned the work as a collaboration with composer Hanns Eisler, but the two broke off their collaboration midway through the project. Two letters (from August 29, 1935 and shortly thereafter) to Hanns Eisler document Brecht's frustration over the attempted long distance collaboration with the composer, also in exile. Thus, the work was initially published without a musical score. In 1954, Brecht invited composer Kurt Schwaen to set the play to music.
