= Demonstration (acting) =

'Demonstration' is a monstration that serves as proof in storytelling.

Demonstration is a central part of the Brechtian approach to acting. It implies a definite distance built into the actor's manner of playing a character (in contrast to the absolute identification with a character demanded by the Stanislavski-influenced "method acting" approach).
