= Fear and Misery of the Third Reich =

1938 play by Bertolt Brecht

Fear and Misery of the Third Reich (German: Furcht und Elend des Dritten Reiches), also known as The Private Life of the Master Race, is one of Bertolt Brecht's most famous plays and the first of his openly anti-Nazi works. It premiered on 21 May 1938 in Paris. This production was directed by Slatan Dudow and starred Helene Weigel. The production employed Brecht's epic theatre techniques to defamiliarize the behaviour of the characters and to make explicit the play's underlying message.

The play consists of a series of playlets, portraying National Socialist Germany of the 1930s as a land of poverty, violence, fear and pretence. Nazi antisemitism is depicted in several of the sketches, including "the Physicist", "Judicial Process", and "the Jewish Wife".

It was followed by many more plays that were openly anti-Nazi (Arturo Ui, etc.) and attempted a Marxist analysis. They were written while Brecht was in exile in Denmark and were inspired by a visit to Moscow, where he experienced the growing significance of the anti-Nazi movement there.

In 1974, the postmodern East German dramatist Heiner Müller wrote an 'answer' to Brecht's play, titled The Battle: Scenes from Germany (revised from a text first written in the early 1950s; first theatrical production opened on 10 October 1975 at the Volksbühne). Tony Kushner's 1985 play A Bright Room Called Day was also based on this play.

== Playlets ==
One Big Family
Two SS Officers talk about "United Nation" and then start shooting.
A Case of Betrayal
A couple have "given away their neighbour" to the SS because they heard foreign broadcasts coming from his house. They are upset that his coat was ripped during the arrest.
The Chalk Cross
An SA man is talking to the cook and his girlfriend, the maidservant; they ask him about raids and he refuses to say. He shows them how he marks people with a white cross so other people know to arrest them. The SA man threatens to have the cook's brother arrested for not saying Heil Hitler fast enough.
Peat-bog soldiers
Prisoners mixing cement and talking, an SS man keeps guard. The prisoners come from differing political factions, but when asked who yelled "Traitors!" all refuse to say, so they are given solitary confinement.
Servants of the people
SS man complaining to the prisoner to stop saying he's a communist because he is tired of flogging him.
Judicial process
Judge asking an inspector to clarify a case against a Jew. The Jew is innocent but as both men "have a family" the justice system is perverse – the judge is forced to pass a verdict which suits the Third Reich but his panic is that he doesn't know which verdict will achieve that.
Occupational disease
An injured man comes to a hospital. The surgeon explains before doing treatment a doctor must ask questions concerning the patient's private life to check if he deserves treatment.
The physicist
Two physicists secretly read about Albert Einstein but when they are overheard they denounce it as being pointless and Jewish.
The Jewish wife
A Jewish wife agonises about how to tell her husband she is leaving him and leaving the country to save his career at a clinic. Eventually he assures her that it's only for 2 or 3 weeks as he hands her the fur coat she won't need till next winter.
The Spy
Two parents quarrel and then panic when they realise their son has gone missing. They are sure he is "handing them over". When he returns with sweets they are still very suspicious. This particular scene was used in Kenneth Johnson's "V" miniseries.
The black shoes
A mother finds money to buy her daughter new shoes but hasn't the money to send her to the Hitler youth.
Labour service
No class distinctions working in a Hitler labour camp.
Workers' playtime
An interview takes place at a factory where everyone has to be pro-German; the announcer edits what they are saying to be more acceptable. The SA watches on.
The box
A father's remains are brought home in a zinc coffin. His family is told he died of pneumonia. Their friend Hans wants to look inside but his wife refuses, warning "they'll come for you too".
Release
A man has been released from a concentration camp and his old friends are suspicious.
Charity begins at home
The SA delivers a charity parcel to an old lady, she thanks them and tells her daughter things are not as bad as she thought in the Third Reich. The SA arrests her daughter.
Two bakers
Two bakers have been arrested: the first two years ago for mixing bran in his bread; the second has just been arrested for refusing to mix bran in his bread.
The farmer feeds his sow
A farmer grows crops; he has to sell the grain for very little money and pay extravagantly for pig food. He is keeping some grain for his pig even though that is not allowed.
The old militant
A butcher whose son was in the SA has no meat and refuses to hang a fake ham in his window. He goes away for a weekend to get new stock and his son is arrested. He hangs himself in the shop window with a sign around his neck saying "I voted for Hitler"
The Sermon on the Mount
A pastor tries to comfort a dying man but cannot answer his questions without being at risk himself.
The motto
A Hitler Youth meeting, one boy hasn't learnt the motto "beat stab shoot them till they fall…" He is accused of learning "something different at home."
News of the bombardment of Almeria gets to the barracks
Two boys discuss food and German bombing of Republican areas of Spain during the Spanish Civil War.
Job creation
A husband has a new job making bomber planes. The wife learns that her brother, a pilot, had an accident and died, and her neighbour tells her about the fighting in Spain and implies her brother was actually sent to Spain and was shot down there. The wife goes into mourning and is told to stop in case the husband loses his job.
Consulting the people
Protesters try to produce an anti-war leaflet, they read a letter from a man who has been executed and still believes in the fight against Hitler. "Best thing would be just one word, NO!"

There are six other scenes, which Brecht eventually cut out:

- Ersatz feelings
- The international
- The vote
- The new dress
- Any good against gas
- A possible last scene for Basel.

=== Epilogue ===
We'll watch them follow the band till
The whole lot come to a standstill –
Beaten, bogged-down elite.
We'd laugh till we were crying
If it weren't for our brothers dying
To bring about his defeat.
(Brecht, 1957, Methuen Drama)

== Adaptations ==
The play was the basis of a 1942 Soviet film directed by Vsevolod Pudovkin entitled The Murderers are Coming.

A BBC Radio production in 1965 starred Maurice Denham, Celia Johnson and Timothy West. The production featured some of the earliest radio work of TV and film composer Carl Davis; one of the songs in the production – "The German Song" – was sung by Dominic Behan, the Irish folk singer/songwriter and playwright, accompanied by the BBC Radio orchestra, arranged and conducted by Carl Davis.

In his 2007 work Ravenhill for Breakfast and its 2008 published edition Shoot/Get Treasure/Repeat, British playwright Mark Ravenhill reworks the themes of fear, suspicion, and the effect terror has on the mind from Brecht's play – especially from the vignette "The Spy" – into the fourth play of his own cycle, Fear and Misery. Ravenhill's play briefly tells the story of Harry's confrontation with his wife Olivia, over dinner, about moving to a safer, gated community for the psychological good of their son Alex, who has been having dreams about a headless soldier. The play, however, is a deeper discussion of the entrenchment of fear and insecurity in both Harry's and Olivia's lives, and in modern society as a whole.

In 2020, Jeremy O. Harris remixed this play into Fear and Misery of the Master Race (of the Brecht) which was performed in the Red Bull Theater's Short New Play Festival.

In September 2, 2022 - the troupe "Theater of the Transitional Period", directed by Vsevolod Lisovsky, gave a street performance in Moscow, which was interrupted by the police. The director, the participants of the performance and the audience were arrested.
