= Ruth Berlau =

Danish actress, director, photographer and writer

Ruth Berlau (24 August 1906, Charlottenlund – 15 January 1974, East Berlin) was a Danish actress, director, photographer and writer, known for her collaboration with Bertolt Brecht and for founding the Bertolt-Brecht-Archiv in Berlin.

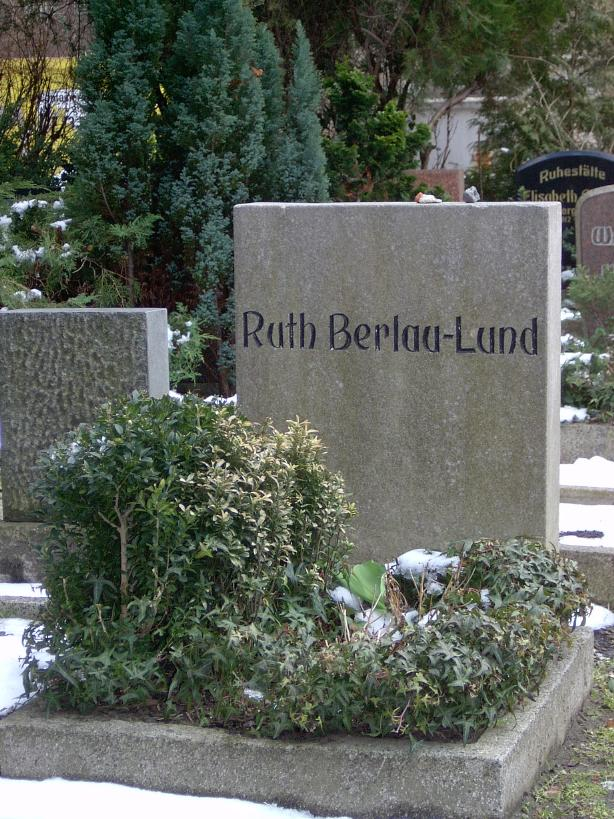
Headstone in the Dorotheenstädtischer Friedhof Berlin

Born to a merchant family, she learned French at a convent school, but had to drop out due to a pregnancy at the age of thirteen. She studied acting and established her Danish reputation playing Anna in Brecht's Drums in the Night. During her teenage years, she financed a bicycle tour of France, by writing up a somewhat fictionalized account of her travels for a Danish newspaper. In 1930, she toured the Soviet Union by bicycle, and on her return joined the Communist Party of Denmark. Later she took part behind the front lines in the Spanish Civil War.

In 1933, she presented herself to the newly arrived Brecht and his wife Helene Weigel, then staying on Fyn or Thurø and within two years had become his lover. In 1936 or 1939, she divorced her husband, Dr. Robert Lund, and threw herself into a collaboration with Brecht, acting as a secretary as well as writing, translating, photographing and directing. With Brecht, Berlau published the short story collection Jedes Tier kann es, considered obscene in its time.

In 1940, she followed the Brecht clan to Sweden, Finland, the USSR and finally to the United States, where a rupture with Brecht took place in 1944. In New York, she gave birth to her only child, who was born premature and only lived for a few days.

After the war, she followed the Brechts to Berlin, but was blacklisted from the Berliner Ensemble by Weigel after Brecht's death in 1956.

== Death ==
She died at age 67 in the Charité hospital after setting her bed alight with a cigarette.

== Writings ==
- Brechts Lai-Tu. Erinnerungen und Notate. Hrsg. und mit einem Nachwort von Hans Bunge. Gudrun Bunge (Mitarbeit). Sammlung Luchterhand. Bd 698, Darmstadt, Neuwied, Luchterhand 1987, ISBN 3-472-61698-9
- Jedes Tier kann es. Erzählungen. Mit einem Nachwort von Klaus Völker. Mannheim, Persona-Verlag 1989, ISBN 3-924652-12-0 (originally published as Maria Sten (pseud.): Ethvert dyr kan det, København, Arthur Jensens Forlag, 1940)
