= Non-Aristotelian drama =

Type of play

Non-Aristotelian drama, or the 'epic form' of the drama, is a kind of play whose dramaturgical structure departs from the features of classical tragedy in favour of the features of the epic, as defined in each case by the ancient Greek philosopher Aristotle in his Poetics (c.335 BCE)

The German modernist theatre practitioner Bertolt Brecht coined the term 'non-Aristotelian drama' to describe the dramaturgical dimensions of his own work, beginning in 1930 with a series of notes and essays entitled "On a non-aristotelian drama". In them, he identifies his musical The Threepenny Opera (1928) as an example of "epic form". "[B]y Aristotle's definition," Brecht writes, "the difference between the dramatic and epic forms was attributed to their different methods of construction." Method of construction here refers to the relation the play establishes between its parts and its whole:

The epic writer Döblin provided an excellent criterion when he said that with an epic work, as opposed to a dramatic, one can as it were take a pair of scissors and cut it into individual pieces, which remain fully capable of life.

Brecht also defines the contrast between the traditional, Aristotelian 'dramatic' and his own 'epic' as corresponding to idealist and materialist philosophical positions:

The epic drama, with its materialistic standpoint and its lack of interest in any investment of its spectators' emotions, knows no objective but only a finishing point, and is familiar with a different kind of chain, whose course need not be a straight one but may quite well be in curves or even in leaps. [...] [W]henever one comes across materialism epic forms arise in the drama, and most markedly and frequently in comedy, whose 'tone' is always 'lower' and more materialistic.

It is this materialist perspective on the world, and specifically on the human being, that renders the epic form particularly appropriate and useful to the dramatist, Brecht argues. Contemporary science (the term includes what English calls "human sciences"; especially, for Brecht, historical materialism) reveals that the human being is determined by and determining of its circumstances ("social" and "physical"). The epic form enables the drama to stage humanity in a way that incorporates this scientific understanding; the dramatist becomes able to show the human (the level of interpersonal relationships) in interaction with the larger forces and dynamics at work in society (the supra-personal, historical scale):

Today, when the human being has come to be seen as 'the sum of all social circumstances' the epic form is the only one that can embrace those processes which serve the drama as matter for a comprehensive picture of the world. Similarly man, flesh and blood man, can only be embraced through those processes by which and in the course of which he exists.

Epic Theatre also rejects the principle of natura non facit saltus (nature does not make jumps) which is a methodological assumption of Swedish naturalist Carl Linnæus used in his categorization of plants and animals.

== See also ==
- Allan Kaprow
- Avant-garde
- Dick Higgins
- Elizabeth LeCompte
- Experimental theatre
- The Flea Theater
- Fluxus
- Happenings
- Heiner Müller
- Intermedia
- Marina Abramović
- Ontological-Hysteric Theater
- Performance art
- Performing Garage
- Postdramatic theatre
- Richard Foreman
- Richard Schechner
- Robert Wilson
- Tadeusz Kantor
- "Speculations: An Essay on the Theater"
- The Wooster Group

== Works cited ==
- Brecht, Bertolt. 1964. Brecht on Theatre: The Development of an Aesthetic. Ed. and trans. John Willett. British edition. London: Methuen. ISBN 0-413-38800-X. USA edition. New York: Hill and Wang. ISBN 0-8090-3100-0.
- Brecht, Bertolt. 1965. The Messingkauf Dialogues. Trans. John Willett. Bertolt Brecht: Plays, Poetry, Prose Ser. London: Methuen, 1985. ISBN 0-413-38890-5.
- Szondi, Peter. 1965. Theory of the Modern Drama. Ed. and trans. Michael Hays. Theory and History of Literature Ser. 29. Minneapolis: University of Minnesota Press, 1987. ISBN 0-8166-1285-4.
- Willett, John. 1964. Editorial notes. In Brecht on Theatre: The Development of an Aesthetic by Bertolt Brecht. British edition. London: Methuen. ISBN 0-413-38800-X. USA edition. New York: Hill and Wang. ISBN 0-8090-3100-0.
- Williams, Raymond. 1993. Drama from Ibsen to Brecht. London: Hogarth. ISBN 0-7012-0793-0. pp. 277–290.
