= Caspar Neher =

Austrian-German scenographer and librettist

Caspar Neher (born Rudolf Ludwig Caspar Neher; 11 April 1897 – 30 June 1962) was an Austrian-German scenographer and librettist, known principally for his career-long working relationship with Bertolt Brecht.

Neher was born in Augsburg. He and Brecht were school friends who were separated for a time by the First World War, during which Neher was awarded the Iron Cross, Second Class (on 2 February 1918). In 1919, he studied under Angelo Jank at the Academy of Fine Arts, Munich. He was first engaged professionally by the Munich Kammerspiele in 1922, although his designs for its production of Brecht's Drums in the Night were rejected. On 18 August 1923, Neher married Erika Tornquist in Graz. Their son, Georg, was born on 14 October 1924. In autumn of 1926, Neher became the staff designer at the Berlin Staatstheater. A year later, he became head of design at the Grillo-Theater in Essen, Germany, where he designed 8 operas and 11 plays. He died in Vienna.

== Scenographic work ==
(All plays by Bertolt Brecht unless otherwise stated.)

- 1923. Das Käthchen von Heilbronn by Heinrich von Kleist at the Berlin Staatstheater; dir. Jürgen Fehling
- 1923. In the Jungle at the Residenztheater in Munich
- 1924. The Life of Edward II of England at the Munich Kammerspiele; dir. Brecht
- 1924. Jungle: Decline of a Family at the Deutsches Theater in Berlin; dir. Erich Engel
- 1925. Coriolanus by William Shakespeare at the Lessing-Theater in Berlin; dir. Erich Engel
- 1925. Circle of Chalk in a version by Klabund at the Deutsches Theater; dir. Max Reinhardt
- 1926. Lysistrata by Aristophanes at the Deutsches Theater; dir. Erich Engel
- 1926. Baal at the Deutsches Theater in Berlin
- 1926. Man Equals Man at the Landestheater Darmstadt; dir. Jacob Geis
- 1926. Earth Spirit and Pandora's Box by Frank Wedekind at the Berlin Staatstheater; dir. Erich Engel
- 1927. The Little Mahagonny at the Deutsche Kammermusik Festival at Baden-Baden; dir. Brecht
- 1927. Die Wupper by Else Lasker-Schüler at the Berlin Staatstheater; dir. Carl Ebert
- 1928. Man Equals Man at the Berlin Volksbühne; dir. Erich Engel
- 1928. Kalkutta, 4. Mai by Lion Feuchtwanger at the Berlin Staatstheater; dir. Erich Engel
- 1928. The Threepenny Opera at the Theater am Schiffbauerdamm in Berlin, music by Kurt Weill
- 1928. Carmen by Georges Bizet at the Kroll Opera House in Berlin
- 1929. Pioneers in Ingolstadt by Marieluise Fleißer at the Theater am Schiffbauerdamm in Berlin; dir. Brecht and Jacob Geis
- 1929. Moritat, Moschopoulos, and Sganarelle by Rudolf Wagner-Régeny at the Grillo-Theater, Essen
- 1929. Wozzeck by Alban Berg
- 1930. Rise and Fall of the City of Mahagonny at the Neues Theater in Leipzig; music by Kurt Weill; dir. Walter Brugmann
- 1931. Man Equals Man at the Berlin Staatstheater; dir. Brecht
- 1931. The Threepenny Opera, costume design for the cinematic adaptation directed by Georg Wilhelm Pabst
- 1931. From the House of the Dead by Leoš Janáček at the Kroll Opera House in Berlin
- 1932. Die Bürgschaft, libretto and design by Neher, music by Kurt Weill, at the Deutsche Oper Berlin; dir. Ebert
- 1932. Un ballo in maschera by Giuseppe Verdi at the Deutsche Oper Berlin; dir. Ebert
- 1932. Rise and Fall of the City of Mahagonny at the Salle Gaveau in Paris; dir. Hans Curjel
- 1932. Oliver Cromwells Sendung by Walter Gilbricht at the Volksbühne; dir. Hilpert
- 1938. Macbeth by Giuseppe Verdi at the Glyndebourne Festival Opera; dir. Ebert
- 1949. Un ballo in maschera by Giuseppe Verdi for the Glyndebourne Festival Opera at the Edinburgh Festival; dir. Ebert
- 1949. Mr Puntila and his Man Matti at the Berliner Ensemble in East Berlin.

== Sources ==
- Sacks, Glendyr. 1994. "A Brecht Calendar." In The Cambridge Companion to Brecht. Ed. Peter Thomson and Glendyr Sacks. Cambridge Companions to Literature Ser. Cambridge: Cambridge University Press. ISBN 0-521-41446-6. p. xvii–xxvii.
- Willett, John. 1967. The Theatre of Bertolt Brecht: A Study from Eight Aspects. Third rev. ed. London: Methuen, 1977. ISBN 0-413-34360-X.
- Willett, John. 1986. Caspar Neher: Brecht's Designer. London and New York: Methuen. ISBN 0-413-41240-7.
