= Eric Bentley =

American playwright

- Bentley in 1976
- Born: Eric Russell Bentley; September 14, 1916; Bolton, Lancashire, England
- Died: August 5, 2020 (aged 103); New York City, U.S.
- Education: University of Oxford; Yale University
- Occupations: Theater critic; scholar; playwright; musician; editor
- Years active: 1938–2020

Eric Russell Bentley (September 14, 1916 – August 5, 2020) was a British-born American theater critic, playwright, singer, editor, and translator. In 1998, he was inducted into the American Theatre Hall of Fame. He was also a member of the New York Theater Hall of Fame, recognizing his many years of cabaret performances.

== Biography ==
Bentley was born in Bolton, Lancashire, the son of Laura Evelyn and Fred Bentley. Bentley attended University College, Oxford, where his tutors were J. R. R. Tolkien and C. S. Lewis; he received his degree in English in 1938. He subsequently attended Yale University (B. Litt. in 1939 and PhD in 1941), where he received the John Addison Porter Prize. Bentley taught History and Drama during the 1942 summer session at Black Mountain College, as well as from 1943 to 1944.

Beginning in 1953, he taught at Columbia University and was a theatre critic for The New Republic. He became known for his blunt style of theatre criticism, and was threatened with lawsuits from both Tennessee Williams and Arthur Miller for his unfavorable reviews of their work. From 1960 to 1961, Bentley was the Charles Eliot Norton Professor at Harvard University.

Bentley was one of the preeminent experts on Bertolt Brecht, whom he met at the University of California, Los Angeles as a young man and whose work he translated extensively. He edited the Grove Press issue of Brecht's work, and recorded two albums of Brecht's songs for Folkways Records, most of which had never before been recorded in English.

In 1968, he signed the Writers and Editors War Tax Protest pledge, vowing to refuse tax payments in protest against the Vietnam War.

His play The Red, White, and Black was produced at La MaMa Experimental Theatre Club in 1971 in collaboration with the Columbia University School of the Arts Theatre Division. Beginning in 1975, Andrei Serban directed multiple productions of Bentley's translation of Brecht's Good Woman of Setzuan at La MaMa, with music by Elizabeth Swados. The 1975 production was followed by a production in 1976 and another production in 1978. The Great Jones Repertory Company also took the show on tour to Europe in 1976.

Bentley was elected a Fellow of the American Academy of Arts and Sciences in 1969. That same year, he made his homosexuality public. In an interview in The New York Times on November 12, 2006, he said he was married twice before coming out at age 53, at which time he left his position as the Brander Matthews Professor of Dramatic Literature at Columbia to concentrate on his writing. He cited his homosexuality as an influence on his theater work, especially his play Lord Alfred's Lover, based on the life of Oscar Wilde.

He won an Obie Award for Lifetime Achievement in Theatre from the American Theatre Wing in 2006 and a Robert Chesley Award in 2007.

Bentley became an American citizen in 1948 and had been living in New York City for many years at the time of his death. He turned 100 on September 14, 2016.

Bentley died at his home in Manhattan on August 5, 2020, at the age of 103.

== Selected works ==
He wrote numerous books of theatre criticism. In addition, he edited The Importance of Scrutiny (1964), a collection from Scrutiny: A Quarterly Review, and Thirty Years of Treason: Excerpts from Hearings Before the House Committee on Un-American Activities, 1938–1968 (1971). His most-produced play, Are You Now Or Have You Ever Been: The Investigations of Show-Business by the Un-American Activities Committee 1947–1958 (1972), was based on the transcripts from the House Un-American Activities Committee collected in Thirty Years of Treason.

=== Books (theatre criticism) ===
- 1944: A Century of Hero Worship
- 1946: The Playwright As Thinker
- 1947: Bernard Shaw
- 1948: The Modern Theatre
- 1953: In Search of Theater
- 1956: What Is Theatre?
- 1964: The Life of the Drama
- 1971: Thirty Years of Treason
- 1972: Theater of War
- 1981: Brecht Commentaries
- 1987: Thinking About The Playwright

=== Plays ===
- 1967: A Time To Live & A Time To Die (published by Broadway Play Publishing Inc.)
- 1972: Are You Now Or Have You Ever Been: The Investigations of Show-Business by the Un-American Activities Committee 1947–1958
- 1979: Lord Alfred's Lover (collected in Monstrous Martyrdoms, 1985)
- 1979: Wannsee, a Tragi-Comedy (published in The Massachusetts Review Vol. 20, No. 3)
- 1985: H for Hamlet
- German Requiem (collected in Monstrous Martyrdoms, 1985)
- Round One (published by Broadway Play Publishing Inc.)
- Round Two (published by Broadway Play Publishing Inc.)
- "The Sternheim Trilogy" containing The Underpants, The Snob, & 1913 (published by Broadway Play Publishing Inc.)

=== Discography ===
The following are recordings done by Bentley for Folkways Records.

- 1961: "Bertolt Brecht before the Committee on Un-American Activities: An Historical Encounter"
- 1963: "A Man's A Man by Bertolt Brecht"
- 1964: "Songs of Hanns Eisler"
- 1965: "Bentley on Brecht: Songs and Poems of Bertolt Brecht"
- 1965: "Bertolt Brecht's The Exception and the Rule"
- 1968: "The Elephant Calf and Small Comments on Large Themes"
- 1968: "Bentley on Biermann: Songs and Poems of Wolf Biermann"
- 1970: "Eric Bentley Sings The Queen of 42nd Street"
