= Karl Valentin =

German comedian (1882–1948)

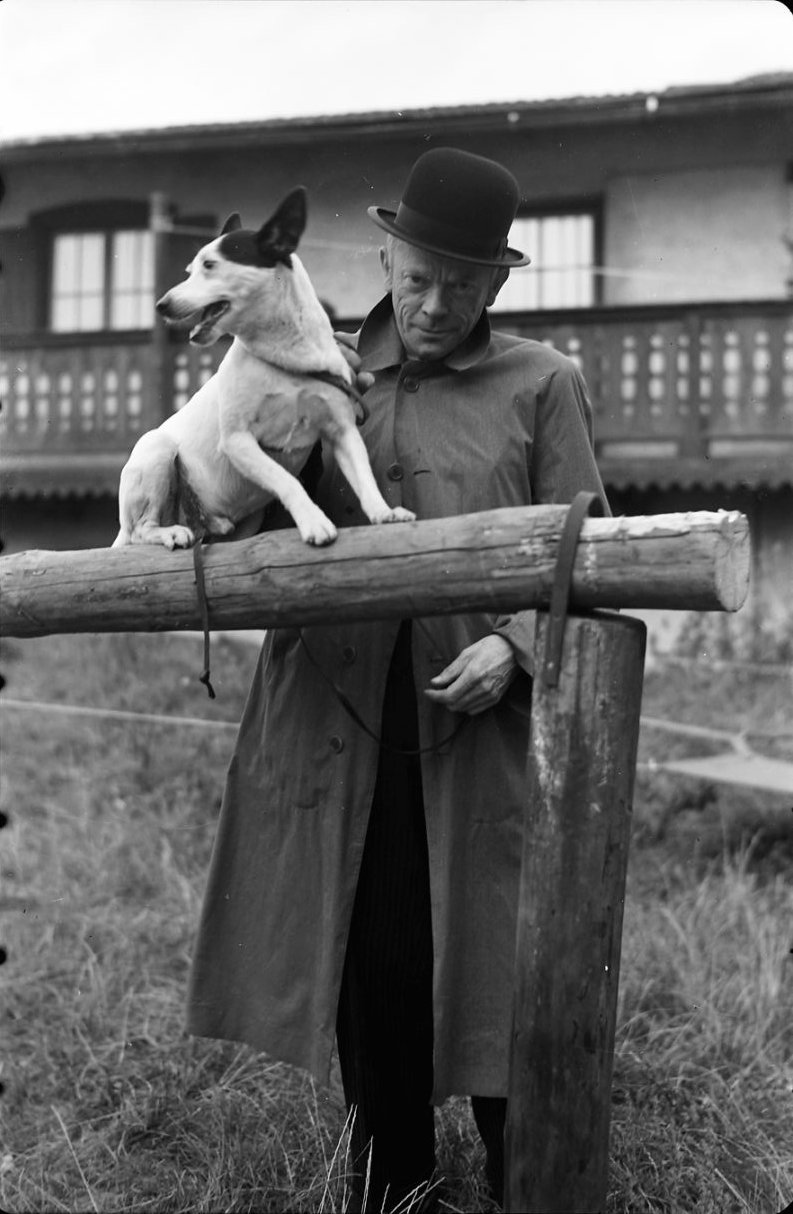
- Valentin with his dog Bopsi in 1936
- Born: Valentin Ludwig Fey; 4 June 1882; Munich, German Empire
- Died: 9 February 1948 (aged 65); Planegg, Bavaria, Germany
- Occupations: Actor; comedian; filmmaker; singer; clown; playwright; author
- Known for: His sketches and poems

Comedy career
- Genres: Black comedy; sketch comedy

Karl Valentin (IPA: ['falɛntiːn], born Valentin Ludwig Fey; 4 June 1882 – 9 February 1948) was a Bavarian comedian. He had significant influence on German Weimar culture. Valentin starred in many silent films in the 1920s, and was sometimes called the "Charlie Chaplin of Germany". His work has an essential influence on artists like Bertolt Brecht, Samuel Beckett, Loriot and Helge Schneider.

== Early work ==
Karl Valentin was born in Munich and came from a reasonably well-off middle-class family; his father had a partnership in a furniture-transport business. Valentin first worked as a carpenter's apprentice, and this experience proved useful in the construction of his sets and props later in life. In 1902, he began his comic career, enrolling for three months at a variety school in Munich, under the guidance of Hermann Strebel. His first job as a performer was at the "Zeughaus" in Nuremberg. In the wake of his father's death Valentin took a three-year break from performing during which he constructed his own twenty-piece one-man band (with which he eventually toured in 1906). Valentin also took musical studies, learning the guitar with Heinrich Albert.

Soon Valentin was performing regularly in the cabarets and beerhalls of Munich. He developed a reputation for writing and performing short comic routines, which he performed in a strong Bavarian dialect, usually with his female partner, Liesl Karlstadt. Valentin also made numerous films, both silent and with audio; but it was as a stage performer in cabarets that Valentin built a reputation as one of the leading comic performers in Germany during the Weimar Republic.

He died in Planegg in 1948 from pneumonia.

== With Bertolt Brecht ==
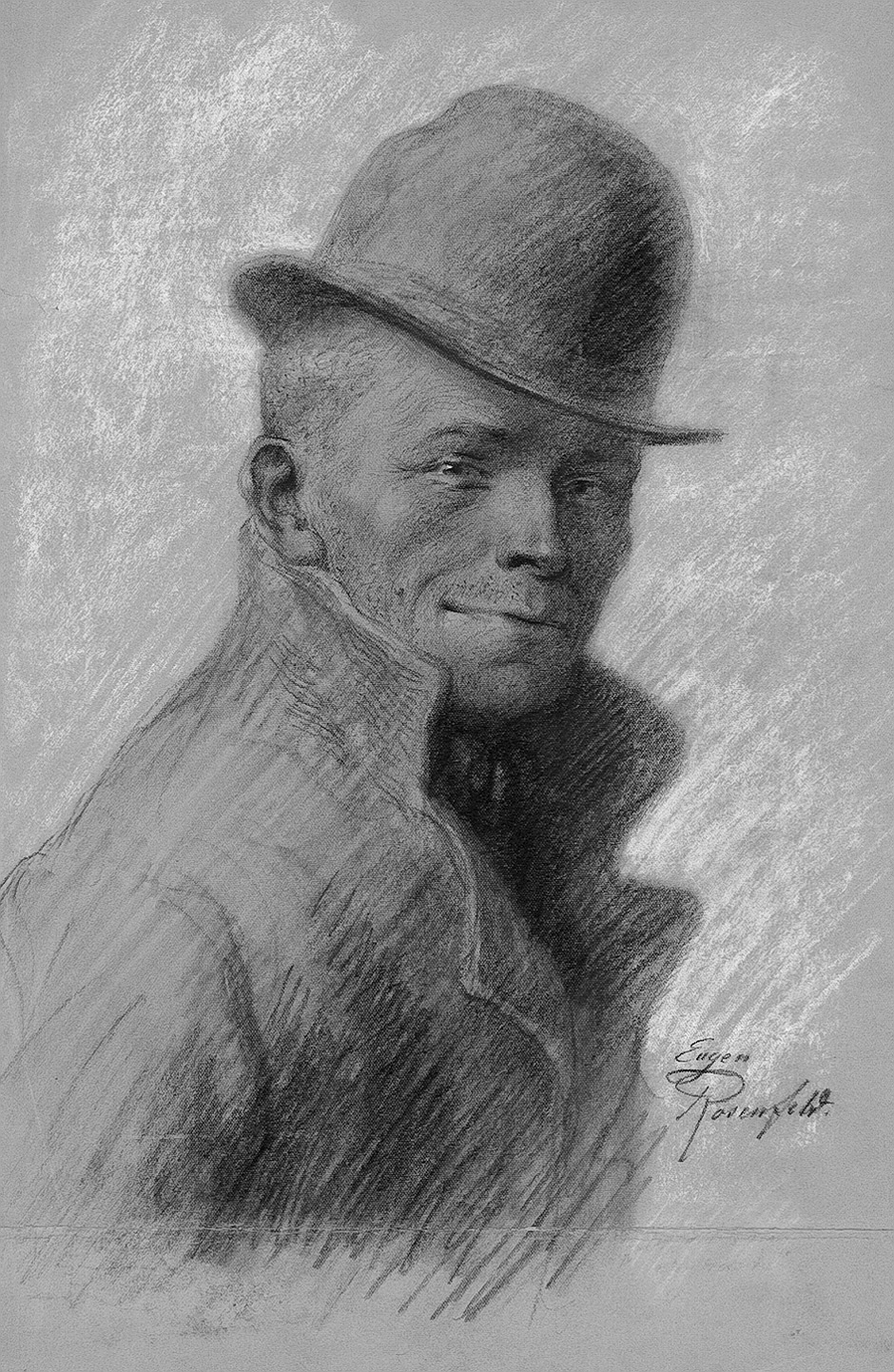
Sketch of Valentin by Eugen Rosenfeld.

In 1923, Valentin appeared in a half-hour, slapstick film entitled Mysteries of a Barbershop (Mysterien eines Friseursalons).

The film script was written by Bertolt Brecht, directed by Erich Engel, and also featured Valentin's cabaret partner, Liesl Karlstadt, as well as an ensemble of stage, film, and cabaret performers, including Max Schreck, Erwin Faber, Josef Eichheim, and Blandine Ebinger. Although the film was not immediately released after it was completed in February 1923, it has come to be recognized as one of the one hundred most important films in the history of German filmmaking.

The previous year, 1922, Bertolt Brecht had appeared with Valentin and Karlstadt in a photo of Valentin's spoof of Munich's Oktoberfest. Brecht regularly watched Valentin perform his cabaret routines in Munich's beerhalls, and compared him to Chaplin, not least for his "virtually complete rejection of mimicry and cheap psychology."

Brecht wrote:

But the man he [Brecht writes of himself in the third person] learnt most from was the clown Valentin, who performed in a beer-hall. He did short sketches in which he played refractory employees, orchestral musicians or photographers, who hated their employer and made him look ridiculous. The employer was played by his partner, a popular woman comedian who used to pad herself out and speak in a deep bass voice. When the Augsburger [Brecht] was producing his first play, which included a thirty minutes' battle, he asked Valentin what he ought to do with the soldiers. 'What are the soldiers like in battle?' Valentin promptly answered: 'They're pale. Scared shitless.'

This anecdote has become significant in the history of German theatre, since it was Valentin's idea of applying chalk to the faces of Brecht's actors in his production of Edward II that Brecht located the germ of his conception of 'epic theatre'.

In September 1922, Brecht postfaced the premiere of his play Trommeln in der Nacht with a ‘revue’ presented at the Munich Kammerspiele entitled Die rote Zibebe (after the name of the play’s inn), featuring himself, actors from the play performing poems, and established cabaret performers like Klabund and Joachim Ringelnatz, followed by a performance of the duo of Karl Valentin and Liesl Karlstadt.

== Performance style ==
Valentin's naïve sense of humour produced sketches that in spirit were loosely connected to dadaism, social expressionism and the Neue Sachlichkeit. Along with Karl Kraus, he is considered a master of gallows humor. His art centered mostly around linguistic dexterity and wordplay—Valentin was a linguistic anarchist. His comedy would often begin with a simple misunderstanding, on which he would insist as the sketch progressed. His sketches often parodied and derided "shopkeepers, firemen, military band players, professionals with small roles in the economy and the defence of society".

== Legacy ==
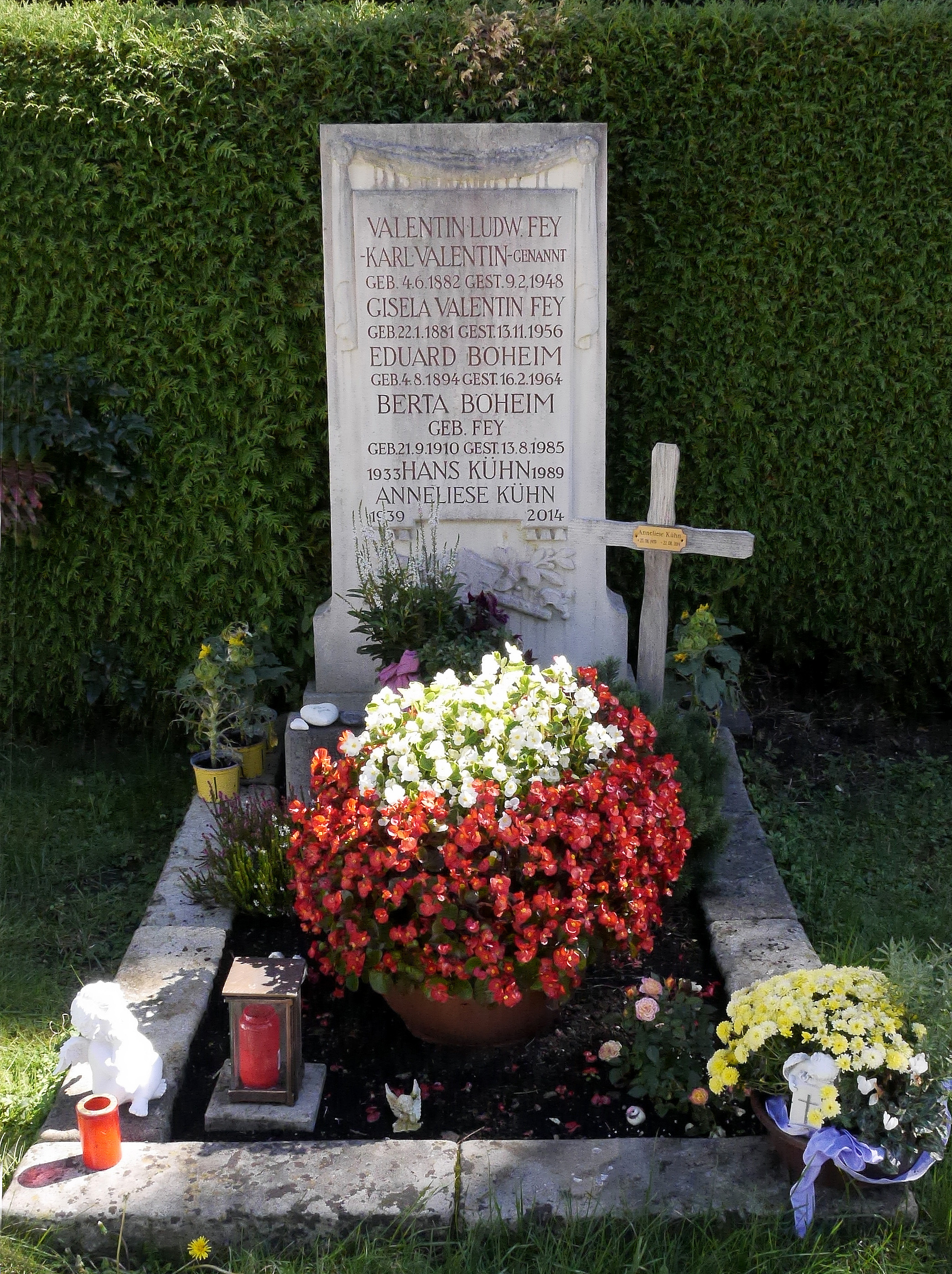
Karl Valentin's grave in Planegg.

- In 1959 based on private initiative the Valentin-Museum was established in the Isartor in Munich. This museum shows absurdities from parts of his legacy.
- A statue of Valentin was placed in the Viktualienmarkt in Munich. People still come and place flowers on this statue.
- 1986 Turkish musical play named "İçinden Tramvay Geçen Şarkı" ("The Song Through Which a Streetcar Passes") by Ferhan Şensoy is loosely based on life of Karl Valentin.

== Available works ==
=== Films on DVD ===
- Karl Valentin and Liesl Karlstadt: Die Kurzfilme (The Short Films, 3 DVDs), Munich 2002, Publisher Film101
- Karl Valentin and Liesl Karlstadt: Die Spielfilme (The Feature Films, 3 DVDs), Munich 2004, Publisher Film101
- Karl Valentin and Liesl Karlstadt: Die beliebtesten Kurzfilme (The most popular short films), Munich 2006, Publisher Film101
- Karl Valentin and Liesl Karlstadt: Die Kurzfilme – Neuedition (The Short Films - new edition, 3 DVDs) Munich 2008, Publisher Film101

=== Complete Works ===
Complete Works in 8 volumes. Edited by Helmut Bach Maier and Manfred Faust. Munich: Piper.

- Volume 1: Monologe und Soloszenen (monologues and solo scenes). 309 p. ISBN 3-492-03401-2
- Vol 2: Couplets, 424 p. ISBN 3-492-03402-0
- Vol 3: Szenen (scenes). 388 p., 1995. ISBN 3-492-03403-9
- Vol 4: Dialoge (dialogues). 485 p., 1995. ISBN 3-492-03404-7
- Vol 5: Stücke (Pieces). 557 p., 1997. ISBN 3-492-03408-X
- Vol 6: Briefe (Letters). 379 p., 1991. ISBN 3-492-03406-3
- Vol 7: Autobiographisches und Vermischtes (Autobiographical and Miscellaneous). 400 p. ,1996. ISBN 3-492-03407-1
- Vol 8: Filme und Filmprojekte (Films and film projects). 618 p., 1995. ISBN 3-492-03405-5
- Dokumente, Nachträge, Register (Documents, amendments and register). 277 p., 1997. ISBN 3-492-03977-4

== Works cited ==
- Benjamin, Walter. 1983. Understanding Brecht. Trans. Anna Bostock. London and New York: Verso. ISBN 0-902308-99-8.
- Brecht, Bertolt. 1965. The Messingkauf Dialogues. Trans. John Willett. Bertolt Brecht: Plays, Poetry, Prose Ser. London: Methuen, 1985. ISBN 0-413-38890-5.
- Calandra, Denis. 2003. "Karl Valentin and Bertolt Brecht." In Popular Theatre: A Sourcebook. Ed. Joel Schechter. Worlds of Performance Ser. London and New York: Routledge. p. 189–201. ISBN 0-415-25830-8.
- Double, Oliver and Wilson, Michael. 2006. I"Brecht and cabaret." In Cambridge Companion to Brecht, 2nd Edition. Eds. Peter Thomson and Glendyr Sacks. Cambridge University Press. {{ISBN|0-521-67384-6.}}
- Horwitz, Kurt "Karl Valentin in einer anderen Zeit," Stürzflüge im Zuschauerraum (Munich, Piper Verlag, 1970), pp. 16–17
- McDowell, W. Stuart. 1977. "A Brecht-Valentin Production: Mysteries of a Barbershop", in Performing Arts Journal, Vol. 1, No. 3 (Winter, 1977), pp. 2–14.
- McDowell, W. Stuart. 2000. “Acting Brecht: The Munich Years," in The Brecht Sourcebook, Carol Martin, Henry Bial, editors (Routledge, 2000) p. 7183.
- Schechter, Joel. 1994. "Brecht's Clowns: Man is Man and After". In Thomson and Sacks (1994, 68–78).
- Thomson, Peter and Glendyr Sacks, eds. 1994. The Cambridge Companion to Brecht. Cambridge Companions to Literature Ser. Cambridge: Cambridge University Press. ISBN 0-521-41446-6.
- Willett, John. 1967. The Theatre of Bertolt Brecht: A Study from Eight Aspects. Third rev. ed. London: Methuen, 1977. ISBN 0-413-34360-X.
- Willett, John and Ralph Manheim. 1970. Introduction. In Collected Plays: One by Bertolt Brecht. Ed. John Willett and Ralph Manheim. Bertolt Brecht: Plays, Poetry and Prose Ser. London: Methuen. ISBN 0-416-03280-X. p.vii-xvii.
