= Mysteries of a Barbershop =

1923 film

- Karl Valentin as the Barber
- Directed by: Erich Engel
- Written by: Bertolt Brecht, Karl Valentin
- Starring: Erwin Faber, Karl Valentin, Max Schreck, Blandine Ebinger, Josef Eichheim, Annemarie Hase, Kurt Horwitz, Liesl Karlstadt, Hans Leibelt, Carola Neher, Otto Wernicke
- Music by: silent
- Release dates: 1923 (created, but not released until rediscovered in 1972)
- Running time: 33 minutes (one reeler)
- Country: Germany
- Language: (subtitles) German

Mysteries of a Barbershop (German: Mysterien eines Frisiersalons) is a comic, slapstick German film of 33 minutes, created by Bertolt Brecht, directed by Erich Engel, and starring the Munich cabaret clown Karl Valentin and leading stage actor Erwin Faber. Brecht reportedly did not write a complete shooting script, but rather produced "notes" and "parts of a manuscript" (according to Faber) for this short, silent film and intended the actors to improvise the action. Although the film was not considered a success by any of its creative team, and consequently was never released as a profit making film to the public, it has been recognized and acknowledged—since its re-discovery in a Moscow archive in the 1970s—as a considerably important German film.

== Production ==
In an interview with Erwin Faber, who played Dr. Moras—the "romantic star" of the film—it was clear that Mysteries of a Barbershop was intended by Brecht in this, his first attempt at filmmaking, to be nothing more than "just a little joke."

Mysteries of a Barbershop was created during a month-long pause before the beginning of rehearsals for Bertolt Brecht's early drama, In the Jungle of Cities at the Munich National Theatre, in February 1923. Brecht and Erich Engel (the director of In the Jungle), assembled a cast that included Karl Valentin, Liesl Karlstadt (Valentin's cabaret partner), Erwin Faber (the leading actor in Munich at the time and star of Brecht's three staged plays in Munich – Drums in the Night, In the Jungle of Cities, and the forthcoming Edward II), Max Schreck (soon to be a leading film actor in such films as Nosferatu), comic actor Josef Eichheim, character actor Kurt Horwitz, Carola Neher (later to play the lead in Brecht's Happy End and the role of Polly in the film of Threepenny Opera) and the cabaretist (and wife of songwriter Friedrich Hollaender), Blandine Ebinger. The group improvised a series of comic and mock-romantic scenes, which, according to one critic, "contains enough cruelty jokes to have made WC Fields envious."

== Plot ==
The plot revolves around Dr. Moras (Faber) who visits a barber (Valentin), who accidentally shaves Moras to look like a Chinese person, and then mistakenly cuts off Moras' rival's head, which is sewn back on, and ends with a sword fight—"The Duel"—in which Faber is triumphant, actually saved by the barber's assistant (Ebinger), and Ebinger and Faber embrace in a happy ending in a mysterious Senegalese Salon.

== Reception ==
The finale of Faber and Ebinger kissing illustrates one of Brecht's first uses of the mock-romantic "happy ending" that would become a signature of Brecht's work throughout the years of the Weimar Republic.

One critic aptly called the short film "dadaesque absurdity combine[d] with clownesque slapstick." Another reviewer called it "Karl Valentin meets Dada and the Marx Brothers." In a list of the 100 most important German films, compiled in 1994 by the Association of German Cinémathèques, Mysteries of a Barbershop was placed at #90.

== Crew and cast ==
- Director: Erich Engel (with a little help from Bertolt Brecht)
- Script: Bertolt Brecht (with Karl Valentin and quite possibly Erich Engel)
- Actors: Erwin Faber, Karl Valentin, Max Schreck, Blandine Ebinger, Josef Eichheim, Annemarie Hase, Kurt Horwitz, Liesl Karlstadt, Hans Leibelt, Carola Neher, Otto Wernicke.
