= The Life of Edward II of England =

Play by Bertolt Brecht, debuted in 1924

Poster for the Riverside Shakespeare Company's production of Edward II. New York, 1982.

The Life of Edward II of England (German: Leben Eduards des Zweiten von England), also known as Edward II, is an adaptation by the German modernist playwright Bertolt Brecht of the 16th-century historical tragedy by Marlowe, The Troublesome Reign and Lamentable Death of Edward the Second, King of England, with the Tragical Fall of Proud Mortimer (c.1592). The play is set in England between 1307 and 1326. A prefatory note to the play reads:

Here is shown before the public the history of the troubled reign of Edward the Second, King of England, and his lamentable death
likewise the glory and end of his favourite, Gaveston
further the disordered fate of Queen Anne
likewise the rise and fall of the great earl Roger Mortimer
all which befell in England and specially in London, more than six hundred years ago.

Brecht wrote his adaptation in collaboration with Lion Feuchtwanger. It is written mostly in irregular free verse, with two songs (one of which is from Marlowe's original), over twenty-one scenes. Looking back at the play-text near the end of his life, Brecht offered the following assessment of their intentions: "We wanted to make possible a production which would break with the Shakespearean tradition common to German theatres: that lumpy monumental style beloved of middle-class philistines."

== Influence on the development of epic theatre ==
The production of Edward II generated a moment in rehearsal that has become one of the emblematic anecdotes in the history of theatre, which marks a genuine event; a new organizing force had suddenly arrived on the theatrical scene and the shape of 20th-century theatre would come to be determined by the passage of the 'epic' through the dramatic, theatrical and performative fields. Walter Benjamin records Brecht's recollection in 1938 of the pivotal incident:

Brecht in turn quoted the moment at which the idea of epic theatre first came into his head. It happened at a rehearsal for the Munich production of Edward II. The battle in the play is supposed to occupy the stage for three-quarters of an hour. Brecht couldn't stage-manage the soldiers, and neither could Asya [Lacis], his production assistant. Finally he turned in despair to Karl Valentin, at that time one of his closest friends, who was attending the rehearsal, and asked him: 'Well, what is it? What's the truth about these soldiers? What about them?' Valentin: 'They're pale, they're scared, that's what!' The remark settled the issue, Brecht adding: 'They're tired.' Whereupon the soldiers' faces were thickly made up with chalk, and that was the day the production's style was determined.

In this simple idea of applying chalk to the faces of Brecht's actors to indicate the "truth" of the situation of soldiers in battle, Brecht located the germ of his conception of 'epic theatre'. As Tony Meech suggests, the material that Brecht was re-working to a certain extent lent itself to this treatment, but it was the combination of several factors that enabled this production to become so significant:

With its historicised setting, its large cast and broad scope of action, this is the first of Brecht's plays which can usefully be called 'epic'. It was also the first of his adaptations of classic texts and his first attempt at fully collaborative writing. In both the writing and the direction of this play, Brecht entered into a new phase of his work for the theatre. Where each of the first three plays is, to some extent, a rejection of influences, Edward II is an attempt to lay the foundations of a new style of theatre, the development of which in practice and the definition of which in his theoretical writing would occupy Brecht for the rest of his working life.

== Production history ==
=== Munich, 1924 ===
The play opened at the Munich Kammerspiele on March 19, 1924, in a production that constituted Brecht's solo directorial début. Caspar Neher designed the sets, as he had for the production of Brecht's In the Jungle the year before. Oskar Homolka played Mortimer and Erwin Faber played Edward, with Maria Koppenhöfer and Hans Schweikart also in the cast. According to Faber, Brecht's entire production, from the script to the staging of the scenes, was "balladesque".

=== New York City, 1982 ===
The Riverside Shakespeare Company staged the play's Off Broadway premiere at the newly renovated The Shakespeare Center on West 86th and Amsterdam, New York City. The production opened on April 23, 1982. W. Stuart McDowell directed, with assistance from Jeannie H. Woods. It featured Dan Southern as Gaveston and Tim Oman as Edward. The cast also included Andrew Achsen, Larry Attille, Christopher Cull, Michael Franks, Margo Gruber, Dan Johnson, Will Lampe, Joe Meek, Jason Moehring, Gay Reed, Count Stovall, Patrick Sullivan, and Jeffery V. Thompson. Dorian Vernacchio designed the set and lighting, David Robinson was the costume designer, and Valerie Kuehn was responsible for the props. Michael Canick composed an original musical score for percussion, which was played by Noel Counsil. Bertha Case (the literary representative for the Brecht estate in the United States) and Stefan Brecht (Bertolt Brecht's son) authorized the production in August 1981, to take place the following year. Joseph Papp and the New York Shakespeare Festival sponsored the production, with additional support from the Goethe House and Marta Feuchtwanger (widow of Lion Feuchtwanger, the play's co-author). As part of the director's dramaturgical preparation, McDowell travelled to Germany to interview Erwin Faber and Hans Schweikart, two of the actors in Brecht's original production of 1924.

== Works cited ==
- Brecht, Bertolt. 1924. The Life of Edward II of England. Trans. Jean Benedetti. In Collected Plays: One. Ed. John Willett and Ralph Manheim. Bertolt Brecht: Plays, Poetry and Prose Ser. London: Methuen, 1970. 179–268. ISBN 0-416-03280-X. Trans. of Leben Eduards des Zweiten von England. Potdsam: Gustav Kiepenheuer Verlag.
- ---. 1964. Brecht on Theatre: The Development of an Aesthetic. Ed. and trans. John Willett. British edition. London: Methuen. ISBN 0-413-38800-X. USA edition. New York: Hill and Wang. ISBN 0-8090-3100-0.
- McDowell, W. Stuart. 1999. "Actors on Brecht: The Early Years." In Brecht Sourcebook. Ed. Carol Martin and Henry Bial. Worlds of Performance ser. London and New York: Routledge. 71–83. ISBN 0-415-20043-1.
- Meech, Tony. 1994. "Brecht's Early Plays." In Thomson and Sacks (1994, 43–55).
- Sacks, Glendyr. 1994. "A Brecht Calendar." In Thomson and Sacks (1994, xvii-xxvii).
- Thomson, Peter and Glendyr Sacks, eds. 1994. The Cambridge Companion to Brecht. Cambridge Companions to Literature Ser. Cambridge: Cambridge University Press. ISBN 0-521-41446-6.
- Willett, John. 1967. The Theatre of Bertolt Brecht: A Study from Eight Aspects. Third rev. ed. London: Methuen, 1977. ISBN 0-413-34360-X.
- Willett, John and Ralph Manheim. 1970. Collected Plays: One by Bertolt Brecht. Ed. John Willett and Ralph Manheim. Bertolt Brecht: Plays, Poetry and Prose Ser. London: Methuen. ISBN 0-416-03280-X.
