= Ellen Stewart =

American theatre director and producer (1919–2011)

- Portrait of Stewart
- Born: November 7, 1919; United States
- Died: January 13, 2011 (aged 91); New York City, U.S.
- Occupations: Theatre director, impresario
- Years active: 1950s–2011
- Known for: Founder of La MaMa Experimental Theatre Club
- Awards: MacArthur Fellowship; Praemium Imperiale; American Theater Hall of Fame

Ellen Stewart (November 7, 1919 – January 13, 2011) was an American theatre director and producer and the founder of La MaMa Experimental Theatre Club. During the 1950s, she worked as a fashion designer for Saks Fifth Avenue, Bergdorf Goodman, Lord & Taylor, and Henri Bendel.

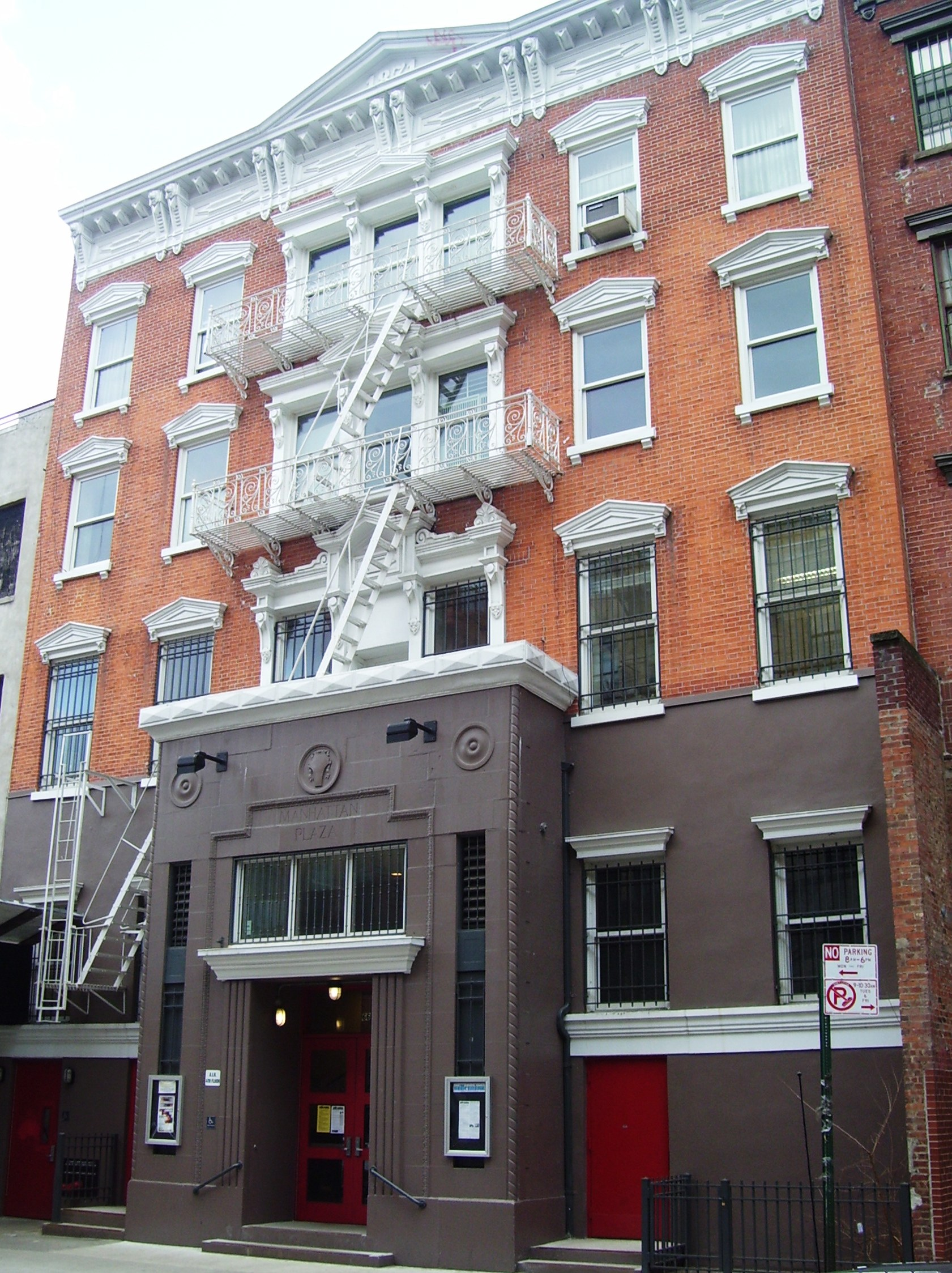
The La MaMa Annex at 66 East Fourth Street

== Early life ==
Ellen Stewart was born in either Chicago, Illinois, or Alexandria, Louisiana. This uncertainty stems from Stewart's reticence to reveal details of her early life. As an observer wrote, "Her history is somewhat difficult to sort out—indeed it takes on a legendary quality—since on different occasions she gives different versions of the same stories." Stewart said that her father was a tailor from Louisiana and her mother was a teacher, and that they divorced during her youth.

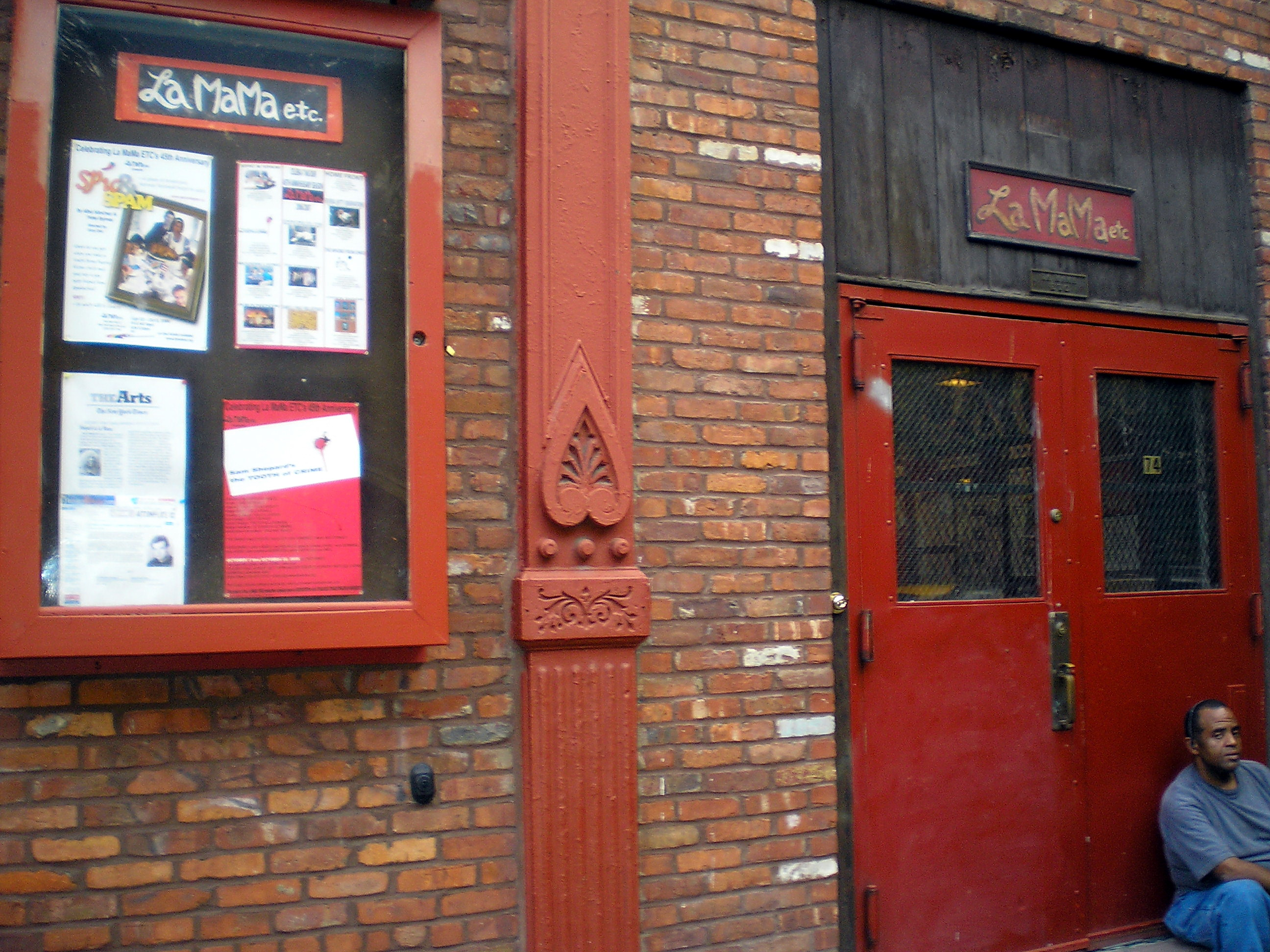
Billboard and entrance to La MaMa Theater, 2006

Around 1939, Stewart may have become the second wife of Larry Lebanus Hovell (August 10, 1910 – October 1963), a Chicago waiter who was a native of Alexandria, Louisiana, though it is possible they never wed legally. They had one child, a son, Larry Lebanus Hovell II (1940–1998).

== Career ==
=== Fashion design ===
Stewart moved to New York City in 1950, where she worked as a trimmer in the brassiere-and-corset department at Saks Fifth Avenue and later as a dress designer under the direction of Edith Lances, head of the custom-corset department of the store. Stewart continued to work as a fashion designer throughout the 1960s and 1970s. Most notably, she worked for a manufacturer named Victor Bijou, designing "sport dresses and beach wraps".

=== Founding La MaMa ===
Stewart had no background in theatre, yet she became a key figure in the beginnings of the Off-Off-Broadway movement. In 1961, Stewart founded Café La MaMa together with Paul Foster and others. A major reason she began the theatre was because her foster brother, Frederick Lights, wanted to be a playwright and he was having difficulty getting his work produced. Café La MaMa eventually became La MaMa Experimental Theatre Club. The theatre was named La MaMa after Stewart because she was referred to by many as "Mama". La MaMa was created as a space for playwrights to experiment with their new work without the influence of critics or commercial interests.

In the early days of La MaMa, Stewart continued designing clothing to support the theatre. Stewart was known to come out before a performance to "ring a cowbell and announce La MaMa's dedication to the playwright and all aspects of the theatre." She also contributed as a designer to many of the early productions, including Tom Eyen's Miss Nefertiti Regrets (1965) and Andrei Serban's production of Brecht's The Good Woman of Setzuan (1978).

In 1969, La MaMa moved to 74-A East Fourth Street, which was built into a 99-seat theatre with the financial support of W. MacNeil Lowry and the Ford Foundation. In 1974, Stewart converted a former television studio at 66 East Fourth Street into a 295-seat theatre named La MaMa Annex. In 2009, the annex was renamed the Ellen Stewart Theatre. La MaMa also has an art gallery and a six-story rehearsal space in the East Village. Altogether, La MaMa puts up approximately 70 productions a year.

=== Directing and international work ===
Stewart started directing theatre later in her life. In 1985 at La MaMa, she directed a production named Mythos Oedipus, which featured music by Sheila Dabney. Stewart also directed the Great Jones Repertory Company in Mythos Oedipus at the Delphi Stadium during their 1985 tour of Greece. That same year, she directed Cotton Club Gala, which featured music by Aaron Bell. In 1989, she directed the Great Jones Repertory Company in Mythos Oedipus and Dionysus Filius Dei.

Her work was produced internationally in Uruguay, Argentina, Austria, Italy, Turkey, the Philippines, Cameroon, Central African Republic, Senegal, Nigeria, Brazil, Haiti, Morocco, Israel, Bulgaria, and Yugoslavia. She both presented theatre and taught in many of these nations. She was a visiting professor at the Institute of Drama in South Korea and was a member of the Seoul International Theatre Institute. The New Eastern European Theatre was introduced to La MaMa when Stewart brought Jerzy Grotowski, Ryszard Cieslak, and Ludwig Flaszen to visit the United States with support from Ted Hoffman of New York University.

She was appointed an officer in the Ordre des Arts et des Lettres of France and received a Distinguished Services to Art and Culture Award in Ukraine. She also received an award from Japan and a human rights award from the Philippines.

=== Recognition ===
In 1992, Stewart was inducted into the American Theater Hall of Fame. She was the first Off-Off-Broadway producer to receive this honor. In 2007, she was awarded the Praemium Imperiale in the field of Film and Theater and the Witkacy Prize, granted annually by the Polish Centre of the International Theatre Institute for "outstanding achievements in the promotion of Polish theatre throughout the world". In 2005, Tom O'Horgan presented Stewart with the Stewardship Award from the New York Innovative Theatre Awards. This honor was bestowed to Stewart on behalf of her peers and fellow artists of the Off-Off-Broadway community "in recognition of her significant contributions to the Off-Off-Broadway community through service, support and leadership".

More recently, the Ellen Stewart International Award was created to be given to "an individual theatre artist or theatre company whose work promotes social change and community participation with a particular focus on the engagement of young people". The International Executive Committee chooses ten artists or companies, then gives the award to one of the ten chosen. The awardee receives a trip to attend the International Theatre Institute's World Congress and a residency at La MaMa Umbria to create a new work to be produced at the Spoleto Festival of Two Worlds and at La MaMa.

A book about Stewart and La MaMa, Ellen Stewart Presents: Fifty Years of La MaMa Experimental Theatre, by Cindy Rosenthal, was published in 2017.

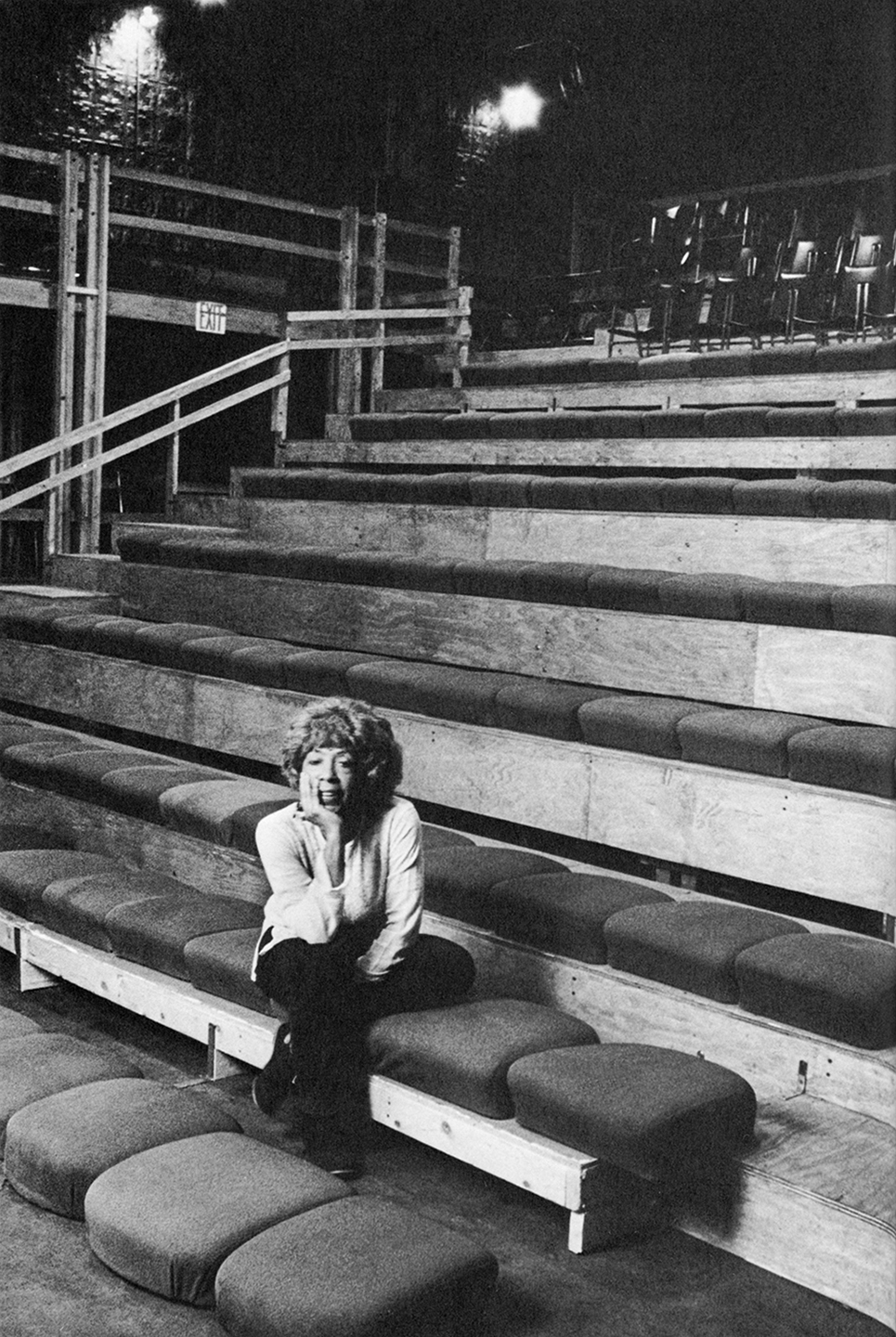
Ellen Stewart photographed by Lynn Gilbert

== Death ==
Ellen Stewart died on January 13, 2011, at age 91. She had a history of heart trouble and died at Mount Sinai Beth Israel after a long illness.

Her memorial service was held at St. Patrick's Cathedral on Monday, January 17, 2011.
