= Max Schreck =

German actor (1879–1936)

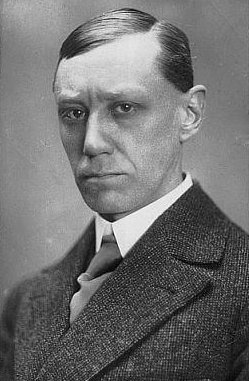
- Schreck in 1916
- Born: Friedrich Gustav Maximilian Schreck; 6 September 1879; Berlin, Kingdom of Prussia, German Empire
- Died: 20 February 1936 (aged 56); Munich, Bavaria, Germany
- Occupation: Actor
- Years active: 1903–1936
- Spouse: Franziska Ott (m. 1910)

Friedrich Gustav Maximilian Schreck (6 September 1879 – 20 February 1936) was a German actor, best known for his lead role as the vampire Count Orlok in the film Nosferatu (1922).

== Early life ==
Max Schreck was born in Berlin-Friedenau, on 6 September 1879. Six years later, his father bought a house in the independent rural community of Friedenau, then part of the district of Teltow. He was baptized at St. Matthew's Church in Berlin.

Schreck's father did not approve of his son's ever-growing enthusiasm for theatre. His mother provided the boy with money, which he secretly used for acting lessons, although only after the death of his father did he attend drama school. After graduating, he travelled briefly across the country with poet and dramatist Demetrius Schrutz.

Schreck had engagements in Mulhouse, Meseritz, Speyer, Rudolstadt, Erfurt and Weissenfels, and his first extended stay at The Gera Theatre. Greater engagements followed, especially in Frankfurt am Main. From there, he went to Berlin for Max Reinhardt and the Munich Kammerspiele for Otto Falckenberg.

Schreck received his training at the Berliner Staatstheater (State Theatre of Berlin), completing it in 1902. He made his stage début in Meseritz and Speyer, and then toured Germany for two years, appearing at theatres in Zittau, Erfurt, Bremen, Lucerne, Gera, and Frankfurt am Main. Schreck then joined Max Reinhardt's company of performers in Berlin. Many members of Reinhardt's troupe went on to make significant contributions to the German film industry.

== Career ==
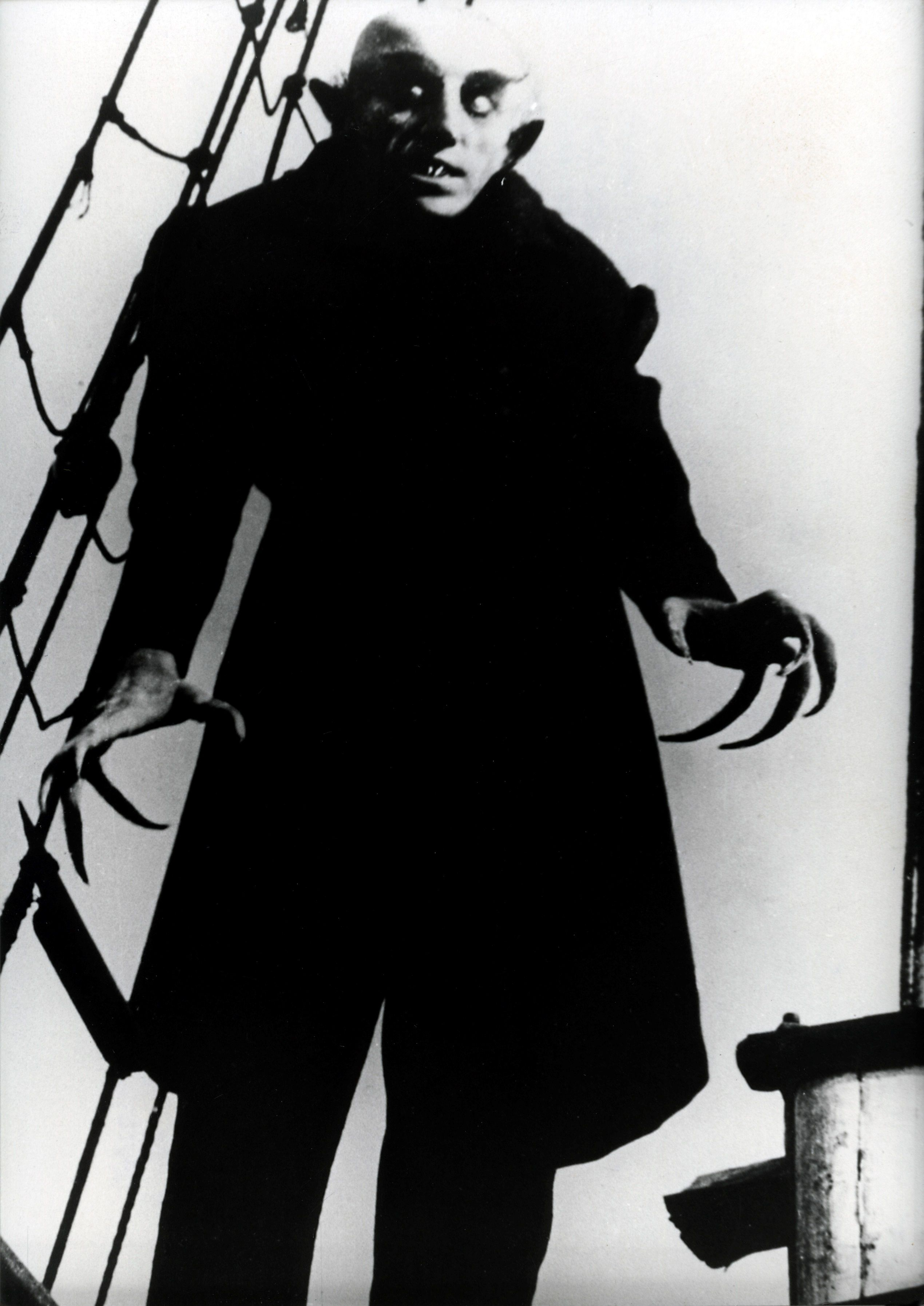
Schreck as Count Orlok

For three years between 1919 and 1922, Schreck appeared at the Munich Kammerspiele, including a role in the expressionist production of Bertolt Brecht's début, Trommeln in der Nacht (Drums in the Night) in which he played the "freakshow landlord" Glubb. During this time, he also worked on his first film The Mayor of Zalamea, adapted from a six-act play, for Decla Bioscop.

In 1921, he was hired by Prana Film for its first and only production, Nosferatu (1922), an unlicenced adaptation of Bram Stoker's novel Dracula. The company declared itself bankrupt after the film was released to avoid paying copyright infringement costs to the author's widow, Florence Stoker. Schreck portrayed Count Orlok, a character analogous to Count Dracula.

While still in Munich, Schreck appeared in a 16-minute (one-reeler) slapstick, "surreal comedy" written by Bertolt Brecht with cabaret and stage actors Karl Valentin, Liesl Karlstadt, Erwin Faber, and Blandine Ebinger, entitled Mysterien eines Friseursalons (Mysteries of a Barbershop, 1923), directed by Erich Engel. Schreck appeared as a blind man in the film The Street (also 1923).

Schreck's second collaboration with Nosferatu director F. W. Murnau was the comedy Die Finanzen des Grossherzogs (The Grand Duke's Finances, 1924). Even Murnau did not hesitate to declare his contempt for the picture. In 1926, Schreck returned to the Kammerspiele in Munich and continued to act in films, his career surviving the advent of sound until 1936, when he died from heart failure.

== Personal life ==
Schreck was married to actress Fanny Normann, who appeared in a few films, often credited as Fanny Schreck. One of Schreck's contemporaries recalled that he was a loner with an unusual sense of humour and skill in playing grotesque characters. He also reported that Schreck lived in "a remote and incorporeal world" and that he often spent time walking through forests. There were rumours at the time of Nosferatu and for many years afterwards that Schreck did not actually exist, and was instead a pseudonym for the well-known actor Alfred Abel.

In January 1933, just as Adolf Hitler and the Nazi Party were swept into power, Schreck performed in Die Pfeffermühle ("The Peppermill"), an openly anti-fascist cabaret run by Erika Mann and other left-leaning artists in Munich. The show was shut down by the Nazi authorities after only two months. Schreck was not involved in party politics and never joined the Nazi Party. His pre-1933 circle included Bertolt Brecht, Max Reinhardt, and other progressive or Jewish theater figures, many of whom who were forced into exile or would later perish during the Holocaust. After 1933, his film roles shrank dramatically, probably because of both his associations with left-leaning figures and his reputation for a "difficult" personality, but he kept working on stage in Munich until the night before he died.

== Death ==
On 19 February 1936, Schreck had just played The Grand Inquisitor in the play Don Carlos, standing in for Will Dohm. That evening, he felt unwell, and the doctor sent him to the hospital, where he died early the next morning of a heart attack. His obituary especially praised his lead role performance in Molière's play The Miser. He was buried on 14 March 1936 at Wilmersdorfer Waldfriedhof Stahnsdorf in Brandenburg.

== Cultural references ==
The person and performance of Max Schreck in Nosferatu was fictionalised by actor Willem Dafoe in E. Elias Merhige's Shadow of the Vampire. In a secret history, Shadow posits that Schreck was a real vampire. Dafoe was nominated for the Academy Award for Best Supporting Actor for his portrayal of Schreck.

Scriptwriter Daniel Waters created the character Max Shreck (portrayed by Christopher Walken) for the Tim Burton film Batman Returns and compared him to the character Max Schreck played in Nosferatu. Variety claimed the name was an in-joke.

== Selected filmography ==
- The Mayor of Zalamea (1920) as Don Mendo
- The Story of Christine von Herre (1921) as Peter the domestic
- Nosferatu (1922) as Count Orlok
- Nathan the Wise (1922) as the Great Master of the Order of the Temple
- The Street (1923) as the blind man
- The Merchant of Venice (1923) as the Doge of Venice
- Dudu, a Human Destiny (1924)
- War in Peace (1925) as the apothecary
- The Pink Diamond (1926) as Watson
- Out of the Mist (1927)
- The Strange Case of Captain Ramper (1927)
- Doña Juana (1927) as Juana's father
- At the Edge of the World (1927) as Troedler
- Luther (1928) as Aleander
- Scampolo (1928) as the waiter
- Serenissimus and the Last Virgin (1928)
- The Republic of Flappers (1928)
- Volga Volga (1928)
- Modern Pirates (1928)
- Fight of the Tertia (1929)
- Ludwig II, King of Bavaria (1929)
- Boycott (1930)
- The Land of Smiles (1930)
- A Man with Heart (1932)
- Boo! (1932) as Dracula (archive footage from Nosferatu)
- The Love Hotel (1933)
- A Woman Like You (1933)
- Must We Get Divorced? (1933)
- The Tunnel (1933)
- Knockout (1935)
- Donogoo Tonka (1936)
- The Last Four on Santa Cruz (1936)

== See also ==
- Category:Nosferatu for images related to the film
- Category:Images of Max Schreck for articles and Wikipedia-hosted media related to Max Schreck
