= Great Jones Repertory Company =

The Great Jones Repertory Company is the Repertory Company of La MaMa Experimental Theatre Club in the East Village of Manhattan, New York City.

The company is named after Great Jones Street, where La MaMa's rehearsal building is located. As described on their website, the company is an "intergenerational, racially and ethnically diverse ensemble of artists, actors, designers, and musicians whose landmark works remain a significant part of La MaMa’s history."

Great Jones Repertory was founded in 1972 by Elizabeth Swados, Andrei Șerban, and La MaMa founder and artistic director Ellen Stewart. Beginning with Fragments of a Greek Trilogy in 1972, Great Jones has most notably performed a number of Obie Award-winning experimental theatre works based in Greek tragedy.

Other works performed by the company have included Eric Bentley's adaptation of Bertolt Brecht's Good Woman of Setzuan and repertory productions of Shakespeare's As You Like It between 1976 and 1980.

In 2015, Great Jones Rep premiered Pier Paolo Passolini's "Plyade," directed by Ivica Buljan from Croatia. The Pylade cast featured guest Slovenian actor, Marko Mandić as Pylade with company members Mia Yoo, Perry Yung, Chris Wild, Cary Gant, eugene the poogene, maura nguyen donohue, Valois Mickens, John Gutierrez, and Tunde Sho as Orestes. The work that toured Italy, Portugal, Croatia, Slovenia and Austria in the summer of 2016 was documented by company member donohue at Culturebot The company developed the Italian Motus Theatre directed production Panorama in December 2017 and January 2018 at La MaMa. The piece was based on various autobiographical experiences of members of the company. It was nominated for a NY Innovative Theater Award and toured to various venues in Italy, and to Spain and Germany.
