= Man Equals Man =

1926 play by Bertolt Brecht

- Written by: Bertolt Brecht
- Original language: German
- Genre: Epic comedy
- Setting: vaguely British India

Premiere
- Date premiered: 25 September 1926
- Place premiered: Darmstadt

Man Equals Man (German: Mann ist Mann: Die Verwandlung des Packers Galy Gay in den Militärbaracken von Kilkoa im Jahre neunzehnhundertfünfundzwanzig), or A Man's a Man, is a 1926 play by the German modernist playwright Bertolt Brecht. One of Brecht's earlier works, it explores themes of war, human fungibility, and identity. It is one of the agitprop works inspired by the developments in USSR praising Bolshevik collectivism and the replaceability of each member of the collective (along with the play The Decision (1930) and the poem "Verwisch die Spuren" (1926)).

Not only was the play the first to emerge after Brecht's move from Munich to Berlin, but it was also the first to be produced by what came to be known as 'the Brecht collective',

"that shifting group of friends and collaborators on whom he henceforth depended. As such it mirrored the artistic climate of the middle 1920s, with their attitude of Neue Sachlichkeit (or New Matter-of-Factness), their stressing of the collectivity and downplaying of the individual, and their new cult of Anglo-Saxon imagery and sport. Together the 'collective' would go to fights, not only absorbing their terminology and ethos (which permeates Man Equals Man) but also drawing those conclusions for the theatre as a whole which Brecht set down in his theoretical essay 'Emphasis on Sport' and tried to realise by means of the harsh lighting, the boxing-ring stage and other anti-illusionistic devices that henceforward appeared in his own productions."

As with his earlier In the Jungle (1923), which was set in Chicago, Brecht locates the drama in what was — for his German audience — an exotic setting: British colonial India. Man Equals Man presents the forcible transformation of an Irish civilian, Galy Gay, into the perfect soldier. Using Kiplingesque imagery (as with In the Jungle, though, thanks to Elisabeth Hauptmann's command of English, in a more authentic tone now), Brecht explores personality as something that can be dismantled and reassembled like a machine, in a parable that critic Walter Kerr credited with a "curious foreshadowing of the art of brainwashing." The same characters appear in the short interlude The Elephant Calf.

The play was first staged by two provincial theatres in Düsseldorf and Darmstadt, opening first in the latter on 25 September 1926. This production was directed by Jacob Geis, with set-design by Caspar Neher. Ernst Legal (who was the director of the Landestheater where the play was produced) played Galy Gay.

The play offers an "intermission piece" called "The Elephant Calf". It is a one-act surrealistic farce that has Galy Gay making his return as a baby elephant accused of murdering its mother.

In March 1927 Radio Berlin's new drama department broadcast an adaptation of the play; an introductory note in Der Deutsche Rundfunk described the piece as "the most powerful and original stage play of our time". Charles Marowitz listed it among Brecht's major plays in 1972.

== Texts ==
In the current publication, the Arcade edition was translated from Brecht's final revision in 1954 by Gerhard Nellhaus (and by Brecht himself, who made his own English version of the first scene). The Bentley translation is based on public domain material of 1926, many years before Brecht finished revising the play.

== Productions ==
In 1931, Brecht himself directed the play, in Berlin starring Peter Lorre.

In 1986, the Hyde Park Theater Company in Hyde Park, New York produced the play starring Bill Murray as Galy Gay. The cast included Stockard Channing as Widow Begbik, Josie de Guzman, Al Corley, Mark Metcalf and Murray's brother, Brian Doyle-Murray. Tim Mayer directed, with music by, among others, Van Dyke Parks.

In early 2014 the Classic Stage Company in New York City produced the play. Brian Kulick directed, and Duncan Sheik composed instrumental and vocal music. The cast included Jason Babinsky, Justin Vivian Bond as Widow Begbik, Gibson Frazier, Martin Moran, Steven Skybell, Stephen Spinella, Ching Valdes-Aran as Mr Wang, Allan K. Washington and Andrew Weems.

== Works cited ==
- Willett, John and Ralph Manheim. 1979. Introduction and Editorial Notes. Collected Plays: Two by Bertolt Brecht. Bertolt Brecht: Plays, Poetry, Prose Ser. London: Methuen, 1994. ISBN 0-413-68560-8.
