= At the Edge of the World (1927 film) =

1927 film directed by Karl Grune

- Directed by: Karl Grune
- Written by: Hans Brennert; Karl Grune
- Starring: Albert Steinrück; William Dieterle; Brigitte Helm; Victor Janson
- Cinematography: Fritz Arno Wagner
- Production company: Universum Film AG
- Distributed by: Universum Film AG
- Release date: 19 September 1927
- Running time: 104 minutes
- Country: Germany
- Languages: Silent; German intertitles

At the Edge of the World (German: Am Rande der Welt) is a 1927 German silent drama film directed by Karl Grune and starring Albert Steinrück, William Dieterle and Brigitte Helm. It was shot at the Babelsberg Studios in Berlin. Robert Neppach oversaw the film's art direction and designed the sets. The film was so heavily cut by the management of UFA that Grune tried to have his name removed from the credits and publicly criticized them in an open letter.

== Cast ==
- Albert Steinrück as Der Mueller
- William Dieterle as John
- Brigitte Helm as Magda
- Victor Janson as Hauptmann
- Jean Bradin as Leutnant
- Imre Ráday as Geselle
- Max Schreck as Troedler
- Camilla von Hollay as Johns Frau
- Erwin Faber as Stranger
- Georg John
- Fee Malten

== Bibliography ==
- Kreimeier, Klaus (1999). The Ufa Story: A History of Germany's Greatest Film Company, 1918–1945. Berkeley: University of California Press. ISBN 978-0-520-22069-0.
