= Fanny Schreck =

German actress

- Born: Franziska Ott; 11 June 1877; Ulm, Kingdom of Württemberg, German Empire
- Died: 11 December 1951 (aged 74); Ulm-Söflingen, West Germany
- Other name: Fanny Schreck-Normann
- Spouse: Max Schreck (m. 1910; died 1936)

Fanny Schreck (born Franziska Ott; 11 June 1877 – 11 December 1951), also known as Fanny Schreck-Normann, was a German actress. She was married to actor Max Schreck. Both husband and wife acted in their best-known film, Nosferatu, with Fanny Schreck uncredited as the nurse and Max Schreck as the vampire Count Orlok.

== Selected filmography ==
- Nosferatu (1922)
- The Trunks of Mr. O.F. (1931)
- Marriage Strike (1935)
