= Pioneers in Ingolstadt =

- Original language: German
- Written by: Marieluise Fleißer
- Genre: Epic comedy
- Setting: Ingolstadt, Bavaria

Premiere
- Date: 25 March 1928
- Place: Dresden

Pioneers in Ingolstadt (German: Pioniere in Ingolstadt) is a play by German playwright Marieluise Fleißer, which premiered on 25 March 1928 in Dresden. The play is set in 1926 and is described as a comedy in 14 Scenes. Fleißer based the play on real incidents, and worked on it in collaboration with Bertolt Brecht. The play was revised and produced at the Theater am Schiffbauerdamm in Berlin in March and April 1929, directed by Brecht and Jacob Geis, with set-design by Caspar Neher. In 1968 Fleißer began a third revision, which was performed in 1970. In 1971, Rainer Werner Fassbinder adapted the play as a film for television.

The setting of the play is Ingolstadt, a provincial city in Bavaria. The play depicts the immorality and selfishness which can be found in small towns, as well as how the militia can disrupt the lives of civilians. As a result of its depiction of a sexist society, the play did not win much sympathy from her fellow inhabitants of Ingolstadt and Fleisser suffered massive unpopularity in her home town after it was published and produced.

In 2019, the play was named as one of the "40 best plays of all time" by The Independent, who wrote that Fleißer's play had been "sorely neglected" and had been "effectively hijacked" by Brecht as he had "imposed overt anti-militarism and sensationalising sex" into the play.

== Characters ==
Berta, the protagonist. She becomes romantically attached to Korl, a soldier who is placed in Ingolstadt to help mend a bridge. She works as a servant for Unertl, the father of Fabian.

Alma, a friend of Berta. She used to work as a servant. Unlike Berta, Alma is a pragmatist. She sternly believes in individuality and living of means, with no reliance upon the male sex.

Korl, a soldier. Korl enjoys the physical aspects of life. On first meeting Berta he assumes that she wants the same from their meeting (sex) and has little patience with her attitude. He informs her that he is a bad person, that he can be cruel and will hurt her if she is good to him.

Fabian, son of Unertl. He is romantically interested in Berta but does not know how to proceed. He asks a friend, Zeck for advice and is told that men should be cold in love ("In der Liebe muß ein Mann kalt sein"). While he shows genuine concern for her feelings, and defends her against the complaints of his father he also falls into treating her as an animal or possession when in male company, in an attempt to show off.

Unertl, a businessman, Fabian's father and Berta's employer. Misogynistic and crude, Unertl is an unsympathetic character embodying the idea that serving girls ought to have no idea in their heads that do not relate to their employ.

== Motifs ==
The motif of the bridge is ironic. The military come into the town in order to mend the bridge for the benefit of the townsfolk. The council send wood for the militia to use. Some of the townsfolk steal wood from the bridge in order to mend the diving board for their pool, showing their narrow and selfish views, talking themselves into stealing wood which would ultimately benefit the whole society. Thus the bridge which could unite the soldiers and the townsfolk, in fact disunites them further.
