= Erwin Faber =

German actor

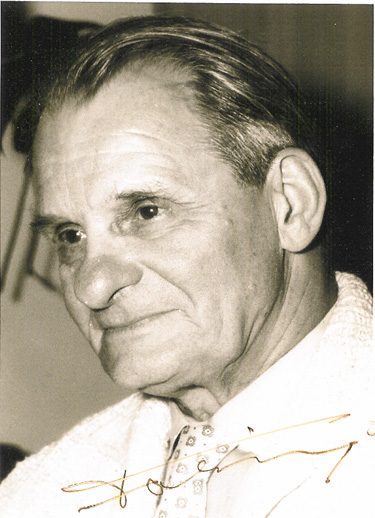
- Erwin Faber, 1976.
- Born: 21 July 1891; Innsbruck, Austria
- Died: 4 May 1989 (aged 97); Munich, Germany
- Occupation: Actor

Erwin Faber (21 July 1891 – 4 May 1989) was a leading actor in Munich and later throughout Germany, beginning after World War I, and through the late-1970s, when he was still performing at the Residenz Theatre (The National Theatre of Bavaria). Born in Innsbruck, Austria, Faber remained in Germany during the Third Reich, emerging afterwards as a prominent actor in the Federal Republic of Germany (West Germany). He died in Munich in 1989, only two months after his last performance at the Residenztheater (the National Theatre of Bavaria), at age 97.

== Acting career ==
In addition to performing in dozens of dramas and films in Germany, working with the leading directors in post-World War I Germany, such as Max Reinhardt, Otto Falckenberg, and Erich Engel, Faber also was chosen by Bertolt Brecht to play the leads in the first three staged plays of Brecht in Munich, beginning with Drums in the Night (Trommeln in der Nacht) at the avant-garde theatre, the Munich Kammerspiele in September 1922, followed by In The Jungle of Cities (Im Dickicht der Städte) at Munich's Residenz Theater in May 1923, and The Life of Edward II of England (Leben Eduards des Zweiten von England) directed by Brecht himself in his directing debut and featuring Oskar Homolka, in March 1924.

Erwin Faber also played the lead in a film written by Brecht in 1923, Mysteries of a Barbershop (Mysterien eines Friseursalons), with leading comic and dramatic actors of Germany of that time: Karl Valentin, Liesl Karlstadt, Blandine Ebinger, Max Schreck, and Carola Neher. The 16-minute improvised film is now considered one of the hundred most important films in history of German film.

Erwin Faber also was cast by Ingmar Bergman for his film Life of the Marionettes in 1980.

== Filmography ==
Year	Film	Role	Notes
1923	Mysterien eines Frisiersalons	Professor Moras	
1927	At the Edge of the World	Stranger	
1929	Land Without Women	Jim Sleigh, goldminer	
1957	Der Edelweißkönig		
1960	Stage Fright	Himself	
1974	Karl May	Napoleon Krügel	

Year	Programme or series	Role	Notes
1962	Kaum zu glauben		
1963	König Ödipus	A servant	
1965	Ein Anruf für Mister Clark	Stationmaster	
1967	Der Werbeoffizier		
1968	Der Unbesonnene	Anselme	
1971	Der Widerspenstigen Zähmung		
1975	Die Medaille	Steinbeissel	
1980	Aus dem Leben der Marionetten		
1984	Zinsen des Ruhms	Constable	
1985	Dom Juan	Gusman	
