= In the Jungle of Cities =

Play by Bertolt Brecht

- Original title: Im Dickicht der Städte
- Original language: German
- Written by: Bertolt Brecht

Premiere
- Date: May 9, 1923
- Place: Residenztheater, Munich
- Directed by: Erich Engel

In the Jungle of Cities (German: Im Dickicht der Städte) is a play by the German modernist playwright Bertolt Brecht. Written between 1921 and 1924, it received its first theatrical production under the title Im Dickicht ("In the jungle") at the Residenztheater in Munich, opening on 9 May 1923. This production was directed by Erich Engel, with set design by Caspar Neher. The cast included Otto Wernicke as Shlink the lumber dealer, Erwin Faber as George Garga, and Maria Koppenhöfer as his sister Mary. Im Dickicht was produced at Max Reinhardt's Deutsches Theater in Berlin, where Brecht had been employed as a dramaturg. The production opened on 29 October 1924, with the same director and scenographer, but in a cut version with a new prologue (reproduced below) and the title Dickicht: Untergang einer Familie ("Jungle: decline of a family"). Fritz Kortner played Shlink and Walter Frank played George, with Franziska Kinz, Paul Bildt, Mathias Wieman, and Gerda Müller also in the cast. Willett and Manheim report that this production "was not a success".

Brecht revised the play almost to its final form—now with the title Im Dickicht der Städte and a subtitle proclaiming "the struggle between two men in the great city of Chicago"—in 1927, when it was produced at the Hessisches Landestheater in Darmstadt, directed by Carl Ebert.

In the prologue to the play, Brecht informs his audience:

"You are in Chicago in 1912. You are about to witness an inexplicable wrestling match between two men and observe the downfall of a family that has moved from the prairies to the jungle of the big city. Don't worry your heads about the motives of the fight; concentrate on the stakes. Judge the contenders' technique impartially, and keep your eyes fixed on the finish."

== Dramatis personae ==
- Shlink – a Malay timber dealer
- George Garga – book clerk at C. Maynes Lending Library
- John Garga – George's father
- Mae Garga – George's mother
- Mary Garga – George's sister
- Jane Larry – prostitute and George's girlfriend
- Skinny – Chinese clerk
- Collie Couch (The Baboon) – pimp
- J. Finnay (The Worm) – pimp and hotel proprietor
- Pat Manky – Ship's first mate
- C. Maynes – owner of C. Maynes Lending Library
- Salvation Army Officer
- The Snubnose
- The Saloonkeeper

== Plot summary ==
George Garga and Shlink are portrayed as two metaphorical boxers locked in a fight for the entirety of the play. Shlink is a wealthy lumber merchant and Garga is a book clerk.

The play opens with Shlink and his accomplices, notably Skinny, The Worm, and The Baboon. He tries to buy Garga's opinion on a book, but Garga refuses to sell it. As a result, Shlink declares war on him and starts to destroy the bookshop. Maynes arrives and soon fires Garga. After Garga leaves, Shlink pays for the damage and departs.

Garga arrives at the lumberyard, and Shlink makes himself Garga's servant. Garga accepts the challenge and immediately makes the business sell the same lot of lumber twice, thereby cheating one of the buyers. He invites a Salvation Army Officer into the room and promises to donate the entire building to him if the Officer will allow them to spit in his face. Shlink then goes over to the officer and spits at him.

Shlink goes to live with The Worm. Garga's sister Marie moves in with him, having fallen in love. Garga's girlfriend Jane is also there, working as a whore for The Baboon. Soon thereafter Garga decides to go away to Tahiti. Shlink arrives at Garga's house and offers to work for them and provide them with money if they give him a place to stay.

Although they all think that Garga has gone to Tahiti, it turns out that he never left Chicago. He soon goes to the hotel where Shlink is staying. When he learns that Marie is living there, he is upset that Shlink has taken over both his sister and his family. Garga starts to try to make Shlink marry Marie, but she becomes afraid and runs to Manky, who happily agrees to take her. Garga also makes Shlink give him all of his remaining money.

Meanwhile, Garga has returned home and married his former girlfriend Jane after stealing her away from The Baboon. His family is living very nicely on the money that Shlink gave him. While celebrating the marriage dinner, Shlink arrives with a letter informing him that he will have to go to jail for three years for making a fraudulent lumber deal. Garga decides to go to jail instead even though it will destroy his family. When his mother hears this, she leaves the family. Garga writes a letter that accuses Shlink of raping his sister and violating his wife. He puts the letter into his pocket and tells his father that he will give the police the letter on the day that they release him from prison.

Three years later Garga gives the police the letter. Shlink is forced to flee from his new lumber yard that he has built during those years. Garga takes some men and visits the Chinese Hotel in order to show them what has become of his sister and wife. Both Marie and Jane are now prostitutes in the hotel, and Jane refuses to even consider returning with Garga. Shlink manages to return to the hotel after setting fire to his lumber yard. He tells Garga that the fight is not yet over and that they need to flee immediately.

In a tent outside of a Chicago, Garga realizes that the fight has been about trying to touch another person by hating them. However, he decides that the fight has gone on too long. Garga proclaims himself the victor and leaves. Marie arrives and watches as Shlink dies in the tent. She defends his dead body from an angry mob that has arrived to lynch him.

Back in Chicago, Garga sells off the burnt down lumber yard to Manky. Garga decides to go to New York City.

== Premiere interrupted by Nazis ==
In the Jungle of Cities premiered at the Residenz Theater (Residenztheater) in Munich on 9 May 1923, starring Erwin Faber and Otto Wernicke in the central roles of Garga and Schlink. The premiere was interrupted several times by Nazis, hooting, whistling and throwing stink bombs at the actors on the stage. It caused a scandal that became an anticipated part of premieres of Brecht's plays and musicals during the Weimar Republic. The production was directed by Erich Engel – his first Brecht production in what was to become a long association with Brecht, lasting up to the time of Brecht's death in 1956. During a pause before the beginning of rehearsals, Brecht, Engel and Faber collaborated with Karl Valentin and other Munich actors to make a short, comic film, Mysteries of a Barbershop.

== Famous productions ==
The world-famous German director Peter Stein directed a landmark production of Im Dickicht der Städte at the Munich Kammerspiele in 1968, when he was Assistant Director there, and before he founded the very influential Schaubühne am Halleschen Ufer in West Berlin a few years later. Dieter Laser, known to English-speaking audiences for his role as Dr. Josef Heiter in The Human Centipede (2010), made his film debut in the role of Collie Couch.

Al Pacino starred in a short-lived production at the Circle in the Square Theatre in New York City in 1979, directed by the famous Romanian director Liviu Ciulei.

Judith Malina directed a Living Theatre production of the play in New York, opening on 16 December 1960.

In October 1991, Ruth Berghaus directed the play at the Thalia Theater in Hamburg as part of a series of 'related texts', as she called them (which also included Büchner's Danton's Death).

== Works cited ==
- Brecht, Bertolt. 1927. In the Jungle of Cities. Trans. Gerhard Nellhaus. In Collected Plays: One. Ed. John Willett and Ralph Manheim. Bertolt Brecht: Plays, Poetry and Prose Ser. London: Methuen, 1970. ISBN 0-416-03280-X. p. 117–178.
- Meech, Tony. 1994. "Brecht's Early Plays." In Thomson and Sacks (1994, 43–55).
- McDowell, W. Stuart. 2000. "Acting Brecht: The Munich Years," The Brecht Sourcebook, Carol Martin, Henry Bial, editors (Routledge) p. 71–83. ISBN 0-203-97955-9.
- McDowell, W. Stuart. 1977. "A Brecht-Valentin Production: Mysteries of a Barbershop", W. Stuart McDowell, Performing Arts Journal, Vol. 1, No. 3 (Winter), pp. 5.
- Thomson, Peter and Glendyr Sacks, eds. 1994. The Cambridge Companion to Brecht. Cambridge Companions to Literature Ser. Cambridge: Cambridge University Press. ISBN 0-521-41446-6.
- Willett, John. 1967. The Theatre of Bertolt Brecht: A Study from Eight Aspects. Third rev. ed. London: Methuen, 1977. ISBN 0-413-34360-X.
- Willett, John and Ralph Manheim. 1970. Introduction and Editorial Note on the Text. In Collected Plays: One by Bertolt Brecht. Ed. John Willett and Ralph Manheim. Bertolt Brecht: Plays, Poetry and Prose Ser. London: Methuen. ISBN 0-416-03280-X. p.vii–xvii and 441–449.
- Willett, John and Ralph Manheim. 1979. Introduction and Editorial Notes. Collected Plays: Two by Bertolt Brecht. Bertolt Brecht: Plays, Poetry, Prose Ser. London: Methuen, 1994. ISBN 0-413-68560-8.
