= The Good Person of Szechwan =

Play by Bertold Brecht

The Good Person of Szechwan (German: Der gute Mensch von Sezuan, first translated less literally as The Good Man of Setzuan) is a play written by the German dramatist Bertolt Brecht, in collaboration with Margarete Steffin and Ruth Berlau. The play was begun in 1938 but not completed until 1941, while the author was in exile in the United States. It was first performed in 1943 at the Zürich Schauspielhaus in Switzerland, with a musical score and songs by Swiss composer Huldreich Georg Früh. Today, Paul Dessau's composition of the songs from 1947 to 1948, also authorized by Brecht, is the better-known version. The play is an example of Brecht's "non-Aristotelian drama", a dramatic form intended to be staged with the methods of epic theater as a parable set in the Chinese "city of Szechwan".

== Themes ==
Originally, Brecht planned to call the play The Product Love (Die Ware Liebe), meaning "love as a commodity". This title was a play on words, since the German term for "true love" (Die wahre Liebe) is pronounced the same way.

The play follows a young prostitute, Shen Teh, as she struggles to lead a life that is "good" according to the terms of the morality taught by the gods, and to which her fellow citizens of Szechwan (Sichuan) pay no regard, without allowing herself to be abused and trodden upon by those who would accept and, more often than not, abuse her goodness. Her neighbors and friends prove so brutal in the filling of their bellies that Shen Teh is forced to invent an alter ego to protect herself: a male cousin named Shui Ta who becomes a cold and stern protector of Shen Teh's interests. The theme of qualitative "goodness" (which seemed so simple and obvious in the title of the play) is rendered unstable by application to both genders, as Shen Teh realizes she must operate under the guise of both in order to live a good life. It has been argued that Brecht's use of the literary device of the split character in this play is a representation of the antagonism between individual-being and species-being that underlies bourgeois societies.

Brecht's interest in historical materialism is evident in the play's definition of contemporary morality and altruism in social and economic terms. Shen Teh's altruism conflicts with Shui Ta's capitalist ethos of exploitation. The play implies that economic systems determine a society's morality.

== Plot summary ==
The play opens with Wang, a waterseller, explaining to the audience that he is on the city outskirts awaiting the foretold appearance of several important gods. Soon the gods arrive and ask Wang to find them shelter for the night after scouting far and wide for good people who still live according to divine principles; thus far they have found only greed, evil, dishonesty, and selfishness. The same turns out to be true in Szechwan: no one will take them in, no one has the time or means to care for others – no one except the poor young prostitute Shen Teh, whose pure inherent charity cannot allow her to turn away anyone in need. Shen Teh was going to see a customer, but decides to help out instead; however, confusion follows, leaving Wong fleeing from the illustrious Ones and leaving his water carrying pole behind.

Shen Teh is rewarded for her hospitality, as the gods take it as a sure sign of goodness. They give her money and she buys a humble tobacco shop which they intend as both gift and test: will Shen Teh be able to maintain her goodness with these newfound means, however slight they may be? If she succeeds, the gods' confidence in humanity would be restored. Though at first Shen Teh seems to live up to the gods' expectations, her generosity quickly turns her small shop into a messy, overcrowded poorhouse which attracts crime and police supervision. In a sense, Shen Teh quickly fails the test, as she is forced to introduce the invented cousin Shui Ta as overseer and protector of her interests. Shen Teh dons a costume of male clothing, a mask, and a forceful voice to take on the role of Shui Ta. Shui Ta arrives at the shop, coldly explains that his cousin has gone out of town on a short trip, curtly turns out the hangers-on, and quickly restores order to the shop.

At first, Shui Ta only appears when Shen Teh is in a particularly desperate situation, but as the action of the play develops, Shen Teh becomes unable to keep up with the demands made on her and is overwhelmed by the promises she makes to others. Therefore, she is compelled to call on her cousin's services for longer periods until at last her true personality seems to be consumed by her cousin's severity. Where Shen Teh is soft, compassionate, and vulnerable, Shui Ta is unemotional and pragmatic, even vicious; it seems that only Shui Ta is made to survive in the world in which they live. In what seems like no time at all, he has built her humble shop into a full-scale tobacco factory with many employees.

Shen Teh also meets an unemployed male pilot, Yang Sun, with whom she quickly falls in love after preventing him from hanging himself. However, Yang Sun doesn't return Shen Teh's feelings but simply uses her for money and Shen Teh quickly falls pregnant with his child.

Eventually, one of the employees hears Shen Teh crying, but when he enters only Shui Ta is present. The employee demands to know what he has done with Shen Teh, and when he cannot prove where she is, he is taken to court on the charge of having hidden or possibly murdered his cousin. The townspeople also discover a bundle of Shen Teh's clothing under Shui Ta's desk, which makes them even more suspicious. During the process of her trial, the gods appear in the robes of the judges, and Shui Ta says that he will make a confession if the room is cleared except for the judges. When the townspeople have gone, Shui Ta reveals herself to the gods, who are confronted by the dilemma that their seemingly arbitrary divine behavior has caused: they have created impossible circumstances for those who wish to live "good" lives, yet they refuse to intervene directly to protect their followers from the vulnerability that this "goodness" engenders.

At the end, following a hasty and ironic (though literal) deus ex machina, the narrator throws the responsibility of finding a solution to the play's problem onto the shoulders of the audience. It is for the spectator to figure out how a good person can possibly come to a good end in a world that, in essence, is not good. The play relies on the dialectical possibilities of this problem, and on the assumption that the spectator will be moved to see that the current structure of society must be changed in order to resolve the problem.

== Productions ==
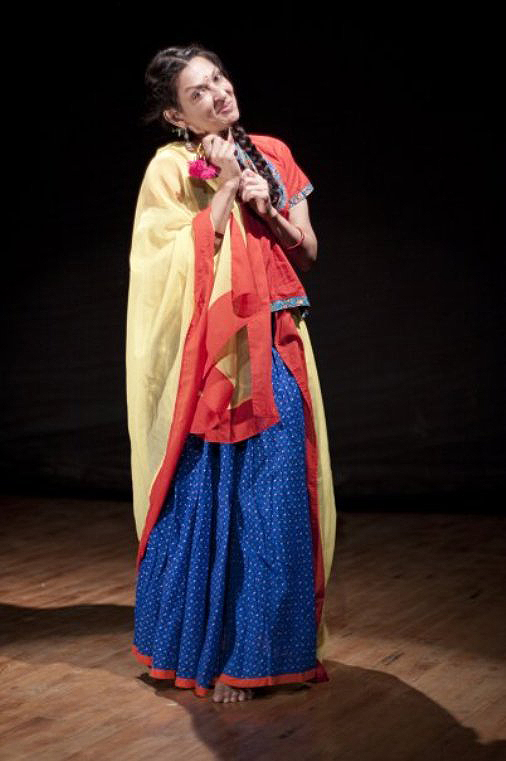
Mallika Sarabhai in a 2009 Indian adaptation of The Good Person of Szechwan directed by Arvind Gaur

The first English-language performance in Britain, as The Good Woman of Setzuan, was given at the Progress Theatre in Reading, Berkshire in 1953. In 1964, Clive Barker directed the Unity Theatre, London troupe in a production for the St. Pancras Arts Festival based on a translation by John Willett and with Patanne Fairfoot in the lead.

Andrei Serban directed the Great Jones Repertory Company in productions of The Good Woman of Setzuan with music by Elizabeth Swados at La MaMa Experimental Theatre Club in 1975, 1976, and 1978. The company also took the production on tour in Europe in 1976.

Composer/lyricist Michael Rice created a full-length musical version with Eric Bentley which premiered in 1985 at the Arkansas Repertory Theatre, directed by Cliff Baker. This version was subsequently licensed through Samuel French.

Episode five of the eighth season of the television series Cheers, "The Two Faces of Norm", was based on the play.

David Harrower created a new translation entitled The Good Soul of Szechuan, which opened at the Young Vic theatre in London from May 8 – June 28, 2008, with Jane Horrocks as Shen Te/Shui Ta and a score and songs by David Sawer. This retained several features of the 1943 version, including the themes of heroin and drug-dealing.

Indian theatre director Ajitesh Bandopadhyay directed an adaptation of this play as Bhalo Manush in early the early 1970s with Keya Chakraborty playing the lead. Arvind Gaur directed another Indian adaptation by Amitabha Srivastava of the National School of Drama in 1996 with Deepak Dobriyal, Manu Rishi, and Aparna Singh as lead actors. In 2009, Arvind Gaur reinterpreted the play with well-known activist and performer Mallika Sarabhai as Shen Te/Shui Ta.

In 2016, Ernie Nolan directed the play at the Cor Theater in Chicago. The role of Shen Te/Shui Ta was played by a male actor (Will Von Vogt) and the setting was a contemporary Chicago ghetto. Tony Kushner's 1997 adaptation was used.

In 2024, Justin Jain directed the play at the Wilma Theater in Philadelphia, running April 2–21 and then available solely by streaming through May 21, also using Tony Kushner's 1997 adaptation. As a means to critique and subvert the "cultural appropriation that pervades the play," Jain set the story in a "Fictional Pan-Asian Narnia" incorporating multiple components from many Asian cultures — for example, one review took stock that "Shui Ta (played by Bi Jean Ngo) speaks a combination of Vietnamese and English, announcements and signs are written in Cantonese, [and] Wang the water-seller (Jungwoong Kim) speaks Korean and is interpreted in English by those around him," though stage-mounted digital signs provide the script in English throughout, essentially serving as both closed captioning and subtitling (at different points) for the audience — while the Three Gods are white, American, "surfer bro" archetype tourists, complete with whiteface, "loud" Hawaiian shirts and "bro tanks", sunglasses, fanny packs, and exaggerated Californian accents. The Broad Street Review notes of the latter portrayal that, "[i]t's played up for laughs while also serving as a multifaceted, pointed criticism of white tourists in Asia, western indifference and exotification, lack of accountability, and, of course, prompting the audience to question the characters' authority and legitimacy as 'gods'. It's an interesting and poignant reverse in a play that has too often been riddled with Orientalist and frankly racist portrayals of Asian characters by non-Asian actors." Dramaturg Kellie Mecleary notes that this portrayal of the Three Gods also serves to represent "the actions and effects of American imperialism on [Jain's] family's country, the Philippines."

Taking place in a "Filipino trash slum," Jain and set designer Steven Dufala used actual trash from an industrial recycling center to create the entire set. In addition to helping them achieve their goal of a zero-waste production, the source of the material also provides a stark contrast in viewpoints between the Western audience and the reality that exists in many developing Asian nations, such as the Philippines, from which Jain's parents immigrated. Jain describes this by saying that, "[t]o us Westerners — First World folks — we see a cardboard box and all we see is a cardboard box. But the ingenuity and adaptation that people who live in that environment see in a cardboard box is really exciting to me. Our stage may at first glance look like disorderly junk, but it has a curated sense of necessity."

== Reception ==
Charles Marowitz listed The Good Person of Szechwan among Brecht's major plays in 1972.

=== Awards and nominations ===
Fiona Shaw was awarded Actress of the Year in 1990 Laurence Olivier Awards for her performance as Shen Te/Shui Ta (along with her performance in As You Like It) in The Good Person of Sichuan at the National Theatre.

In 1976 Obie Awards, Priscilla Smith won Distinguished Performance by an Actress for her performance as Shen Te in The Good Woman of Szechwan produced by La MaMa. In 2013, Lear deBessonet won an Obie for Direction for the Foundry Theatre production of The Good Person Of Szechuan performed in La MaMa.
