= Marieluise Fleißer =

German author and playwright

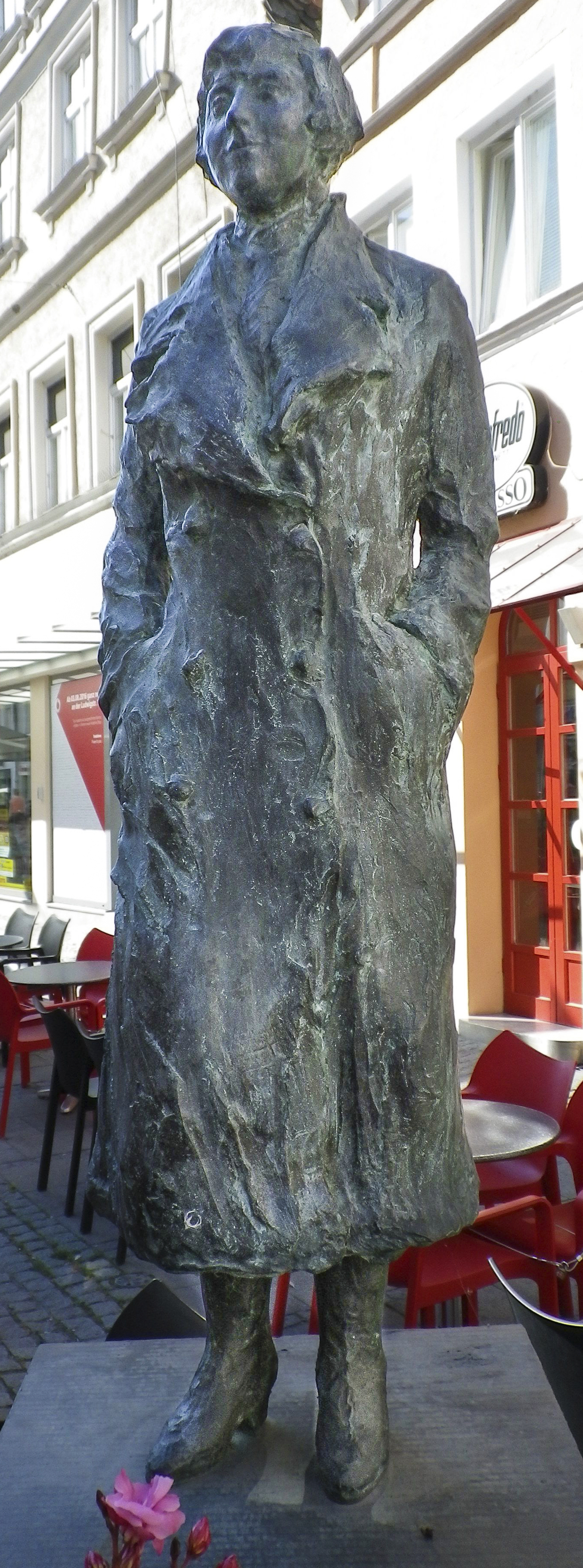
- Born: November 23, 1901; Ingolstadt, German Empire
- Died: February 2, 1974 (aged 72); Ingolstadt, West Germany
- Education: Ludwig-Maximilians-Universität München
- Spouse: Bepp Haindl
- Partner: Hellmut Draws-Tychsen
- Writing career
- Genre: Critical Volksstücke
- Notable work: Pioneers in Ingolstadt
- Notable awards: Marieluise-Fleißer-Preis
- Literary movement: New Objectivity

Marieluise Fleißer (German: [maˌʁiːluˈiːzə ˈflaɪsɐ]; 23 November 1901, in Ingolstadt – 2 February 1974, in Ingolstadt) was a German writer and playwright, most commonly associated with the aesthetic movement and style of Neue Sachlichkeit, or New Objectivity.

== Biography ==
Born in Ingolstadt in 1901 to Anna and Heinrich Fleißer, a smith and hardware store owner, Fleißer was sent to a Catholic convent school in Regensburg for her education, an experience which would later be reflected in her first novel Ein Zierde für den Verein: Roman vom Rauchen, Sporteln, Lieben und Verkaufen (1931). In 1919, she enrolled at the Ludwig-Maximilians-Universität München, where she studied German literature, philosophy, and theater under Arthur Kutscher, the founder of theater studies in Germany and an influential critic and historian of literature; during this period, her first time living on her own, she began writing short stories, such as "Meine Zwillingsschwester Olga," which would be her first publication in 1923. It is during her time as a young student in Munich that Fleißer befriended Lion Feuchtwanger and, through him, Bertolt Brecht, with whom she would collaborate on her playwriting and theatrical productions throughout the 1920s. Brecht would subsequently help her throughout the decade to secure publishing opportunities and support for her plays; conversely, Brecht often felt the liberty, without her permission, to revise and take from her work, which caused considerable strain on their relationship as well as Fleißer's reputation. Due to financial difficulties and the pressure of her father, who wanted her to become a teacher, Fleißer returned to Ingolstadt in 1924, where she would remain until moving to Berlin in 1926. What was a personally fraught time for the young author was artistically rich, as Fleißer wrote her first major play that would ensure her breakthrough in Weimar Germany, Fegefeuer in Ingolstadt (Purgatory in Ingolstadt) (1926). Her first success was followed by a second, Pioniere in Ingolstadt (Pioneers in Ingolstadt) (1929), which scandalized the public through Brecht's unauthorized changes, transforming the piece into an explicitly anti-militaristic and sexually daring satire of petit bourgeois mores and small-town life. Discussed in many of the major German newspapers of the time, the scandal caused an uproar in her hometown: the mayor published a rebuttal, distancing the city from its now most famous daughter, while Fleißer's father temporarily disowned her.

During this tumultuous period, which would prove to be the apex of her fame during her lifetime, Fleißer also published a collection of short stories, Ein Pfund Orangen (A Pound of Oranges, 1929), and became engaged to a local swimming star in Ingolstadt, Bepp Haindl, which was later called off in 1929. After moving to Berlin, she worked as a freelance journalist and author, publishing a travelogue about her journey to Andorra with her then fiancé, the arch-conservative journalist and poet Hellmut Draws-Tychsen. She sunk further into intellectual and social isolation and financial troubles due to her liaison with the notorious conservative, and her subsequent works published in the early 1930s, such as the novel Ein Zierde für den Verein was met with tepid reviews and sales. This culminated in an attempted suicide in 1932 and her move back to Ingolstadt, where she married her first fiancé, the shop owner Bepp Haindl, who forbid her from writing and demanded that she work in his tobacco shop; her fall into contemporary obscurity was sealed in 1935, when was she partially forbidden to write by the Nazis due to her leftist political sympathies and innovative modernist style. The 1930s and 1940s were a difficult period for Fleißer, who suffered from mental illness and unhappiness caused by the stresses and deprivations of war and the work demands placed on her by her husband; after the fall of the Third Reich in 1945, she managed to write little, such as the play Karl Stuart (1944).

It was only from the mid-1950s onwards that Fleißer began her gradual reemergence as a known and celebrated writer. After the death of her husband in 1958, she began writing in earnest again, such as the short story "Avantgarde" (1963) and the play Der starke Stamm (1966), which premiered at the Schaubühne in West Berlin. Awarded a literary prize by the Bavarian Academy of Fine Arts in 1953 and invited to join in 1954, Fleißer was "rediscovered" by a trio of famous young male playwrights and critics, Rainer Werner Fassbinder, Martin Sperr, and Franz Xaver Kroetz (whom she nicknamed her "sons"), who brought her major works of fiction and theater back into the public eye throughout the 1960s and 1970s. For example, Pioneers in Ingolstadt was adapted as a TV film by Fassbinder in 1971. Upon the publication of her complete works, Gesammelte Werke (1972), by the renowned Suhrkamp Verlag, she was awarded the Bavarian Order of Merit in 1973, before dying on February 2, 1974.

== Work ==
Fleißer's best-known works are two plays, Purgatory in Ingolstadt (1924) and Pioneers in Ingolstadt (1928). The plays, which feature lower-class characters from small town in Bavaria, deal with abusive, sometimes violent relationships between men and women. Among literary scholars, the plays are categorized as "critical Volksstücke," a genre that references and engages critically with the conventions of the popular "Volksstück" (literally people's play, also "milieu plays"). Like the original "Volksstück," Fleißer's dramas feature regional (Bavarian) dialect, lower-class characters, and deal with everyday themes and relationships, but unlike the originals, Fleißer exposes unequal power relationships between men and women.

Bertolt Brecht persuaded the director Moriz Seeler to stage the first play, which Seeler retitled; Fleißer's original title was The Washing of Feet. Brecht then encouraged her to write Pioneers. Premiered in Berlin, the plays caused a scandal, especially in her home town, and were attacked by the Nazis, who had not yet come to power.

Fleißer was rediscovered in the 1970s by a later generation, among them the theatre director Peter Stein and the playwright Franz Xaver Kroetz. Pioneers in Ingolstadt was adapted as a TV film by Rainer Werner Fassbinder in 1971.

The plays were given their London premieres at the Gate Theatre, London, in 1990, directed by Annie Castledine and Stephen Daldry.

== Selected works ==
- Meine Zwillingsschwester (1923)
- Die Stunde der Magd (1925)
- Der Apfel (1925)
- Ein Pfund Orangen (1926)
- Fegefeuer in Ingolstadt (Purgatory in Ingolstadt) (1926), originally entitled Die Fußwaschung
- Die Nachgiebige (1927)
- Das enttäuschte Mädchen (1927)
- Die arme Lovise (1928)
- Pioniere in Ingolstadt (Pioneers in Ingolstadt) (1929)
- Ein Pfund Orangen und neun andere Geschichten (1929)
- Die möblierte Dame mit dem mitleidigen Herzen (1929)
- Sportgeist und Zeitkunst. Essays über den modernen Menschentyp (1929)
- Der Tiefseefisch (1930)
- Andorranische Abenteuer (1930)
- Ein Porträt Buster Keatons (1930)
- Mehlreisende Frieda Geier: Roman vom Rauchen, Sporteln, Lieben und Verkaufen, revised and renamed Eine Zierde für den Verein (1972)
- Andorranische Abenteuer (1932)
- Die Frau mit der Lampe: Eine Legende (1933)
- Die Schwedische Aura (1933)
- Karl Stuart (1944)
- Das Pferd und die Jungfer (1952)
- Avantgarde (1963)
- Eine ganz gewöhnliche Vorhölle (1963/72)
- Die im Dunkeln (1965)
- Der Venusberg (1966)
- Der starke Stamm (1966)
- Frühe Begegnung: Erinnerungen an Brecht (1966)
- Abenteuer aus dem Englischen Garten (1969)
- Findelkind und Rebell: Über Jean Genet (1971)
- Ich ahnte den Sprengstoff nicht (1973)

== Bibliography ==
- Claudia Albert. “‘Tatort Sprache’: Erlebte Rede und Subjektposition in der Erzählprosa von Marieluise Fleißer, Franz Kafka und Robert Walser.” In: Jahrbuch zur Literatur der Weimarer Republik 5 (1999/2000): 253-282.
- Kerstin Barndt. “’Engel oder Megäre’: Figuration einer ‚Neuen Frau‘ bei Marieluise Fleißer und Irmgard Keun.” In: Reflexive Naivität: Zum Werk Marieluise Fleißer. Eds. Maria E. Müller et al. Berlin: Erich Schmidt Verlag, 2000. 16-34.
- Susan L. Cocalis, "The Politics of Brutality: Toward a Definition of the Critical Volksstück," Modern Drama 24 (3), 1981: 292–313.
- Susan L. Cocalis, “Weib ohne Wirklichkeit, Welt ohne Weiblichkeit: Zum Selbst-, Frauen-, und Gesellschaftsbild im Frühwerk Marieluise Fleißers.” In: Entwürfe von Frauen in der Literatur des 20. Jahrhunderts. Ed. Irmela von der Lühe. Berlin: Argument-Verlag, 1982. 64-85.
- Walter Delabar. “’Die tapfere Fleißerin’: Bemerkungen zum Frühwerk Marieluise Fleißers.” In: Autorinnen der Weimarer Republik. Eds. Walter Fähnders et al. Bielefeld: Aisthesis Verlag, 2003. 97-118.
- Carmel Finnan, Versions of the Literary Self in Texts by Marieluise Fleißer.” In: Practicing Modernity: Female Creativity in the Weimar Republic. Ed. Christiane Schönfeld. Würzburg: Königshausen & Neumann, 2005/6. 278-296.
- Hiltrud Häntzschel, "'Diese Frau ist ein Besitz': Marieluise Fleißer aus Ingolstadt. Zum 100. Geburtstag.” Special edition of Marbacher Magazin 96 (2001).
- Hiltrud Häntzschel, Marieluise Fleißer: Eine Biographie. Frankfurt am Main: Insel Verlag, 2007. ISBN 978-3-458-17324-3.
- Donna L. Hoffmeister, The Theater of Confinement: Language and Survival in the Milieu Plays of Marieluise Fleisser and Franz Xaver Kroetz, Camden House: Columbia (SC), 1983.
- Lucia-Maria Lichter, “Alles ist notwendig": Zur Ökonomie des Alltags bei Marieluise Fleißer.” In: Reflexive Naivität: Zum Werk Marieluise Fleißer. Eds. Maria E. Müller et al. Berlin: Erich Schmidt Verlag, 2000. 55-77.
- Maria Müller and Ulrike Vedder, eds. Reflexive Naivität: Zur Einleitung.” In: Reflexive Naivität: Zum Werk Marieluise Fleißer. Berlin: Erich Schmidt Verlag, 2000. 9-15.
- Barbara Naumann, ’Hergefegt vor einem unwirtlichen Wind’: Marieluise Fleißers Scheitern an Berlin.” In: Triumph und Scheitern in der Metropole: Zur Rolle der Weiblichkeit in der Geschichte Berlins. Eds. Sigrund Anselm, et al. Berlin: Dietrich Reimer Verlag, 1987. 157-180.
- Irmgard Roebling, “‘Haarschnitt ist noch nicht Freiheit‘: Das Ringen um Bilder der Neuen Frau in Texten von Autorinnen und Autoren der Weimarer Republik.” In: Jahrbuch zur Literatur der Weimarer Republik. Ed. Sabine Becker 5 (1999/2000): 13-76.
- Lianne Schüller, Vom Ernst der Zerstreuung: Schreibende Frauen am Ende der Weimarer Republik: Marieluise Fleisser, Irmgard Keun und Gabriele Tergit. Bielefeld: Aisthesis, 2005.
- Inge Stephan, “Zwischen Provinz und Metropole: Zur Avantgarde-Kritik von Marieluise Fleißer.” In: Weiblichkeit und Avantgarde. Ed. Inge Stephan and Sigrid Weigel. Berlin: Argument Verlag 1987. 112-132.
- Gérard Thiériot, "Marieluise Fleisser (1901–1974) et le théâtre populaire critique en Allemagne", Berne et al., Editions Peter Lang, Collection Contacts, Theatrica 19, 1999.
- Ulrike Vedder, “’Keine Sportperson’? Marieluise Fleißer und der Sportgeist.” In: Frauen in der Literaturwissenschaft, Rundbrief 47: Sport und Kult (1996): 57-63.
