= The Elephant Calf =

The Elephant Calf (German: Das Elefantenkalb), also known as The Baby Elephant, is an early one-act surrealistic prose farce written by the German modernist playwright Bertolt Brecht. It originally formed the penultimate scene of Brecht's full-length play Man Equals Man, but by 1926 Brecht had separated it to an appendix to the published text. It was performed as part of Man Equals Man that same year. It is an interlude form of play within a play and in a later note Brecht suggests that it is "to be played in the foyer". He has also given it the subtitle "or The provability of any and every contention".
