= Andrei Serban =

Romanian-American theater director

Andrei Șerban (born June 21, 1943) is a Romanian-American theater director. A major name in twentieth-century theater, he is renowned for his innovative and iconoclastic interpretations and stagings. In 1992 he became Professor of Theater at the Columbia University School of the Arts, a position he resigned from in 2019, citing oppressive pressure in the name of "political correctness" on a level which reminded him of communist Romania.

== Biography ==
=== Early life ===
Born in Bucharest, he is the son of George and Elpis Șerban. His father came from an old family of Țara Chioarului in Maramureș, studied law at Leipzig, directed a bank and was close friends with Iuliu Maniu, who attended Serban's baptism. After the onset of the communist regime, George was fired and obliged to work as a photographer. His mother came from a family of Greek merchants settled in Tulcea, originally from Cephalonia. She worked as a teacher of Romanian language and literature.

As a child, he was presenting puppet shows at home and staging mock battles with his friends in Bucharest's Grădina Icoanei. From 1961 to 1968, he studied at the Institute of Theatre and Film Arts (IATC). As a student, he directed Julius Caesar, which he now calls his "most daring production ever". Set in the Japanese Kabuki style, with a flower bridge built over the audience, and with Caesar's death performed in slow motion created an enormous scandal. After that, it became very hard for him to find a job in Romania.

He made his debut with two pieces, on November 16, 1968 with The Good Person of Szechwan by Bertolt Brecht and at the following evening with the comedy She stoops to conquer by Oliver Goldsmith at The Theater of Youth in Piatra Neamț.

In 1969, Șerban emigrated to the United States, with the help of Ellen Stewart, and a grant from the Ford Foundation. In 1970, he went to Paris to study at Peter Brook's International Centre for Theatre Research. In 1971, he staged Medea at La MaMa, E.T.C., the experimental theater club in New York City. Three years later, he directed Fragments of a Greek Trilogy (Medea, The Trojan Women, and Electra) in Persepolis at the 9th Shiraz Festival of Arts in Iran (1975) with music by Elizabeth Swados, and also at La MaMa.

=== Career ===
In 1977, he directed Anton Chekhov's The Cherry Orchard at the Lincoln Center for the Performing Arts. The production, starring Irene Worth as Ranevskaya and Meryl Streep as Dunyasha, was nominated for a Tony Award. More recently, Șerban has directed Sarah Kane's Cleansed in Romania; Lucia di Lammermoor at the Opéra Bastille in Paris; and a popular production of Hamlet, starring Liev Schreiber in the title role, at the Public Theater in New York.

For more than two decades, Șerban has been associated with the American Repertory Theatre in Cambridge, Massachusetts. At the A.R.T., he has directed Lysistrata, The Merchant of Venice, The Taming of the Shrew, The King Stag, Sganarelle, Three Sisters, The Juniper Tree, The Miser, Twelfth Night, Sweet Table at the Richelieu, and Pericles.

As a director, Șerban has also worked at the Circle in the Square Theatre, the Yale Repertory Theater, the American Conservatory Theater, the Metropolitan Opera, the New York City, Seattle and Los Angeles Operas, at the Paris, Geneva, Vienna, and Bologna Opera Houses, the Welsh National Opera, Covent Garden, Théâtre de la Ville, the Comédie Française, Helsinki's Lilla Teatern, and with the Shiki Theatre Company in Tokyo. From 1990 to 1993, he headed the National Theatre Bucharest.

While at Columbia, he has directed the Oscar Hammerstein II Center for Theater Studies, and the M.F.A. Acting program. He has also taught at Yale University, Harvard University, Carnegie Mellon University, Sarah Lawrence College, University of California, San Diego, the Paris Conservatoire d'Art Dramatique and the American Repertory Theater's Institute for Advanced Theater Training.

In 2006, he published his autobiography, written in Romanian.

In late 2019, Andrei Șerban resigned from his position at Columbia University, citing pressure on staff to accept teachers and students lacking the required academic standards in the name of political correctness. In an interview with a Romanian TV station, he compared the intransigent leftist atmosphere dominating the American academia to the oppressive one in communist Romania, where artists were told by party functionaries how to think and how to create.

== Honors and awards ==
Andrei Șerban is the recipient of the 1974-75 Obie Award for Trilogy. In 1999, he received from the Boston Theater Critics Association the Elliot Norton Award for Sustained Excellence. The same year, he received from the Society of Stage Directors & Choreographers the prestigious George Abbott Award, honoring artists who have made a major impact on theatre in the twentieth-century. Also in 1999, the Romanian National Foundation for Arts and Sciences, together with the Romanian Academy, awarded him the newly founded Prize for Excellence in Romanian Culture.

He has received grants from the Ford, Guggenheim and Rockefeller Foundations.

== Bibliography ==
- Eugène Ionesco, Le travail d'Andreï Serban: Medea-Elektra, Gallimard, Paris, 1973.
- Arthur Bartow, The Director's Voice: Twenty-One Interviews, Theatre Communications Group, New York, 1988 ISBN 0-930452-74-7
- Ed Menta, The Magic World Behind the Curtain: Andrei Serban in the American Theatre, Peter Lang, New York, 1995 ISBN 0-8204-2640-7
- Andrei Șerban, O biografie, Polirom, Iaşi, 2006. ISBN 973-46-0153-9
- Andrei Șerban, Călătoriile mele. TEATRU / My Journeys. THEATRE, Romanian Cultural Institute, Bucharest, 2008. ISBN 978-973-577-543-8
- Andrei Șerban, Călătoriile mele. OPERA / My Journeys. OPERA, Romanian Cultural Institute, Bucharest, 2008. ISBN 978-973-577-544-5
- Andrei Șerban, Mihaela Marin CHEKHOV SHAKESPEARE BERGMAN văzuți de / seen by Andrei Șerban, Romanian Cultural Institute, Bucharest, 2012. ISBN 978-973-776-367-9
- Octavian Saiu, Teatrul e vis [Theatre is a Dream], Paideia Press, Bucharest, 2013, ISBN 978-973-596-894-6
- Afshar, Mahasti. "Shiraz Arts Festival, 1967-1977." Iran Namag 4(2) Summer 2019: 4-64. He returned with La MaMa to Shiraz with As You Like It in 1977 (pp.. 54-55); the 12th festival was cancelled at the onset of the 1979 Islamic revolution.

== See also ==
- Liliom, play adapted by Andrei Şerban and Daniela Dima as "Carousel"
