= Munich Kammerspiele =

Theatre company in Munich, Germany

Coordinates: 48°08′17″N 11°34′57″E

- Münchner Kammerspiele
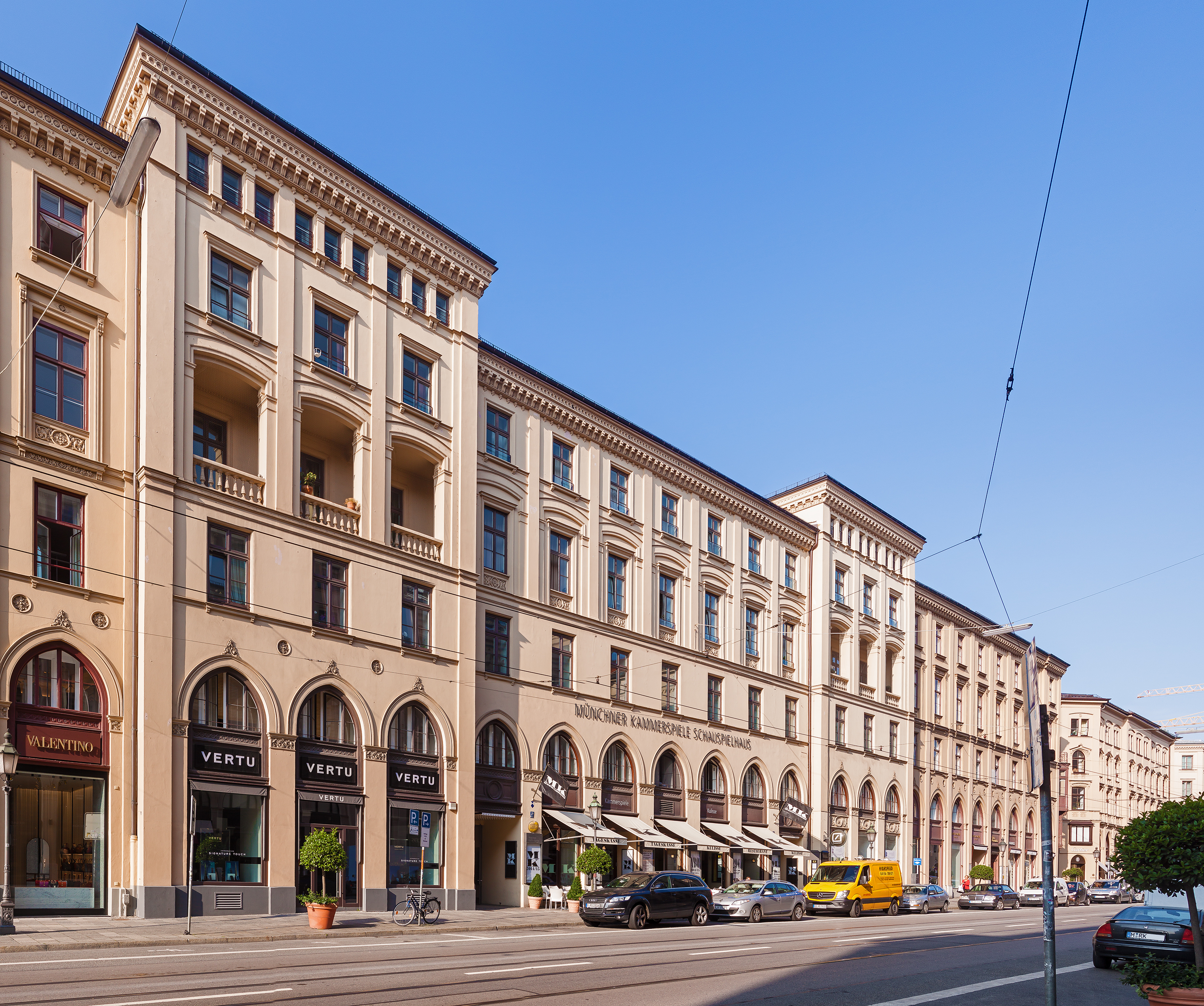
- Schauspielhaus, Maximilianstraße
- Formation: 1906
- Type: Theatre group
- Location: Munich, Germany
- Artistic director: Barbara Mundel
- Website: muenchner-kammerspiele.de

The Munich Kammerspiele (German: Münchner Kammerspiele) is a state-funded German-language theater company based at the Schauspielhaus on Maximilianstrasse in the Bavarian capital. The company currently has three venues: the main stage of the theatre with two small stages, the workroom on Hildegardstrasse, and the Therese-Giehse-Halle in the rehearsal building on Falckenbergstrasse.

== History ==
The company was founded in 1906 in Schwabing as the private troupe of Erich Ziegel. Beginning in 1917, Otto Falckenberg served as director; in 1926, he moved the company into the Schauspielhaus, (built in Art Nouveau style in 1901 by Richard Riemerschmid and Max Littmann). Since 1933, the Münchner Kammerspiele has been a municipal theater company of the City of Munich. In 1961, the Werkraumtheater has served as its second stage. In 2001, the company gained a rehearsal stage next to the Schauspielhaus in a large building designed by Gustav Peichl.

== Directors ==
Since the 1920s, the Münchner Kammerspiele has presented numerous world premieres, including works by Friedrich Dürrenmatt, Frank Wedekind, and Bertolt Brecht. Brecht, Bruno Hübner, Axel von Ambesser, Fritz Kortner, Peter Stein, Franz Xaver Kroetz, Robert Wilson, George Tabori, Erwin Faber, Max Schreck, and other important actors and writers have staged plays with the company, often resulting in awards.

== Artistic leadership ==
One famous producing-director (Intendant) of the Münchner Kammerspiele was Falckenberg (1917–1944). Known as an expert in Expressionism in Germany during the Weimar Republic, he was credited with producing or directing many celebrated productions at the company, including Brecht’s first staged play, Drums in the Night, in 1922, as well as works by Wedekind, August Strindberg, and William Shakespeare. Since the end of World War II in 1945, artistic leadership has been in the hands of Erich Engel (1945–1947), Hans Schweikart (1947–1963), August Everding (1963–1973), Hans-Reinhard Müller (1973–1983), Dieter Dorn (1983–2001), and Frank Baumbauer (2001–2009). In 2010, Johan Simons was appointed artistic director. From 2015 until 2020, Matthias Lilienthal was the artistic director and since 2021, Barbara Mundel has held the position.
