= Otto Falckenberg =

German theatre director

Otto Falckenberg (5 October 1873 in Koblenz – 25 December 1947 in Munich) was a German theatre director, manager and writer. In April 1901, he co-founded Die Elf Scharfrichter, the first political kabarett (a form of cabaret which developed in Germany from 1901).

Otto Falckenberg was the son of the Court music trader Otto Falckenberg and his wife Auguste Nedelmann. In Berlin and Munich he studied philosophy and the history of art and literature. His drama "Erlösung" was staged at the Schauspielhaus in Munich in 1899. In the same year he published a volume of poetry, "Morgenlieder - Gedichte". In 1901 in Munich he was one of the founders of the first German political cabaret "Die Elf Scharfrichter" and he contributed to it until 1903 as performer, author and director. In 1903 he moved to Emmering to become a free author. In that same year he married his first wife Wanda Kick. Their daughter Gina Falckenberg (1907-1996) became an actress and an author.

In 1908 his play "Doktor Eisenbart" was staged in Mannheim. From 1917 to 1944 he was the manager and artistical director of the Münchner Kammerspiele. He was famous for his interpretations of Shakespeare and Strindberg. He brought many actors to fame, among them Bertha Drews, Elisabeth Flickenschildt, Maria Nicklisch, Therese Giehse, Will Dohm and Heinz Rühmann.

In 1920 he married his second wife, the actress Sybille Binder. The marriage soon ended and in 1924 the sculptor Gerda Mädler became his next wife. Their daughter Bettina (b.1926) became an actress. After the nazis came to power in 1933 he was imprisoned for a while but he was released. In 1936 he staged the antisemitical "Rothschild siegt bei Waterloo" by Eberhard Wolfgang Möller. He received the title of Staatsschauspieldirektor and in 1943 he became a professor. After the war he wasn't allowed to work by the US authorities and he taught privately in Starnberg. He died in 1947 in Starnberg.

GRAVE LOCATION Starnberg, Bayern: Friedhof Hanfelderstraße, Hanfelderstrasse 40a

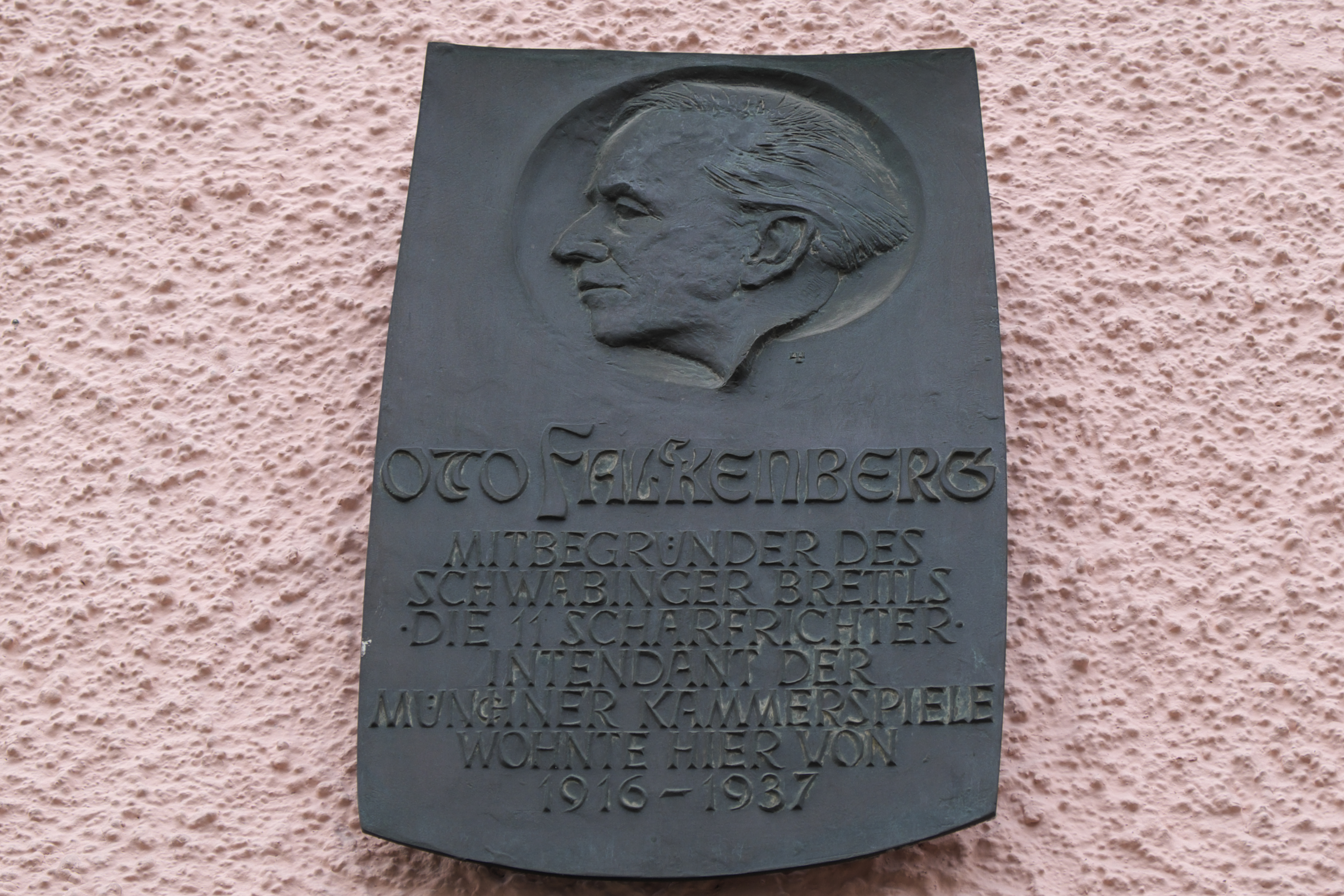
memory for Otto Falckenberg in Viktoriastraße 11 in Munich
