= John Willett =

British translator and scholar

John William Mills Willett, MBE (24 June 1917 – 20 August 2002) was a British translator and scholar, who is remembered for translating the work of Bertolt Brecht into English.

== Early life ==
Willett was born in Hampstead and was educated at Winchester and Christ Church, Oxford. He went on to the Manchester College of Art and Dance, and then to Vienna, where he studied music (Willett played the cello) and stage design.

Willett began his career as a theatre designer. However, this career was cut short by World War II. He served in Intelligence and the Eighth Army, in North Africa and Italy. Beginning his war in July 1940 as a second lieutenant in the British Army, he ended it just over five years later as a lieutenant colonel. In August 1942 he was transferred to the Intelligence Corps, in April 1944 he was mentioned in dispatches and in June 1945 he was made a Member of the Order of the British Empire (MBE).

After being demobilised, Willett worked first for The Manchester Guardian from 1948 to 1951, and then in 1960 he became the deputy to Arthur Crook, the editor of The Times Literary Supplement. Willett remained there until 1967. That year Methuen published his Art in a City, the result of his study into art in Liverpool, commissioned by the city's Bluecoat Society of Arts. A pioneering sociological study of art in a single city, it was republished in 2007 by the Bluecoat and Liverpool University Press, with a new introduction by the Bluecoat's artistic director Bryan Biggs that set Willett's prescient study in the context of Liverpool's cultural renaissance on the eve of its year as 2008 European Capital of Culture. From 1970 to 1973, he taught at the California Institute of the Arts as a Bertolt Brecht scholar.

== Later life ==
Willett became a freelance writer, an editor and translator, a theatre director and a visiting professor and lecturer. He was respected in academic circles for his patient work and careful research in translation, especially in German culture and politics.

Willett's grandfather was William Willett, a builder who promoted British Summer Time. He had a son, John, an architect. From his daughter Alison, he is the great-grandfather of Chris Martin, the lead singer of Coldplay.

== Brecht ==
Willett's love of Brecht began in the 1930s. He first studied Brecht's theatre design work. After the war, he became friends with Brecht himself, although it is said that the friendship got off to a bad start due to a disagreement about the Hitler–Stalin pact, but got back on track after they discovered that they were both interested in Tacitus.

Willett worked on English translations for many of Brecht's plays, including:

- Life of Galileo
- The Good Person of Setzuan
- The Resistible Rise of Arturo Ui
- Mother Courage and Her Children

== Bibliography ==
- Willett, John. 1967. The Theatre of Bertolt Brecht: A Study from Eight Aspects. 3rd rev. ed. London: Methuen, 1977. ISBN 0-413-34360-X.
- ---. 1967. Art in a City. London: Methuen.
- ---. 1978. The New Sobriety 1917–1933: Art and Politics in the Weimar Period. London: Thames & Hudson. ISBN 0-500-23283-0.
- ---. 1984. The Weimar Years: A Culture Cut Short. London: Thames and Hudson. ISBN 0-500-01316-0
- ---. 1998. Brecht in Context: Comparative Approaches. Rev. ed. London: Methuen. ISBN 0-413-72310-0.
- ---. 2007. Art in a City. Liverpool: Liverpool University Press and The Bluecoat. ISBN 978-1-84631-082-9
