= Joseph Papp =

American producer and director (1921–1991)

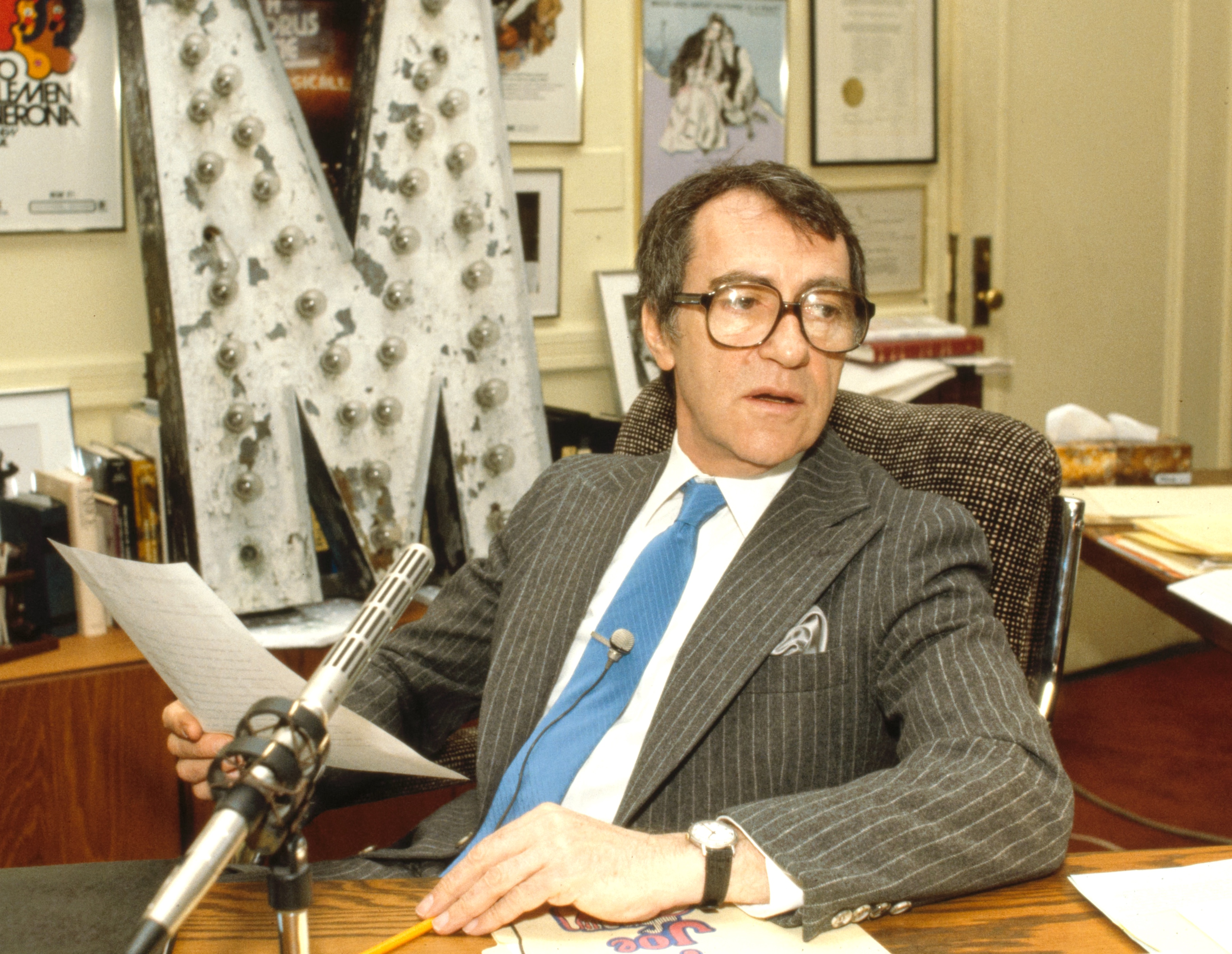
- Papp in 1982
- Born: Joseph Papirofsky; June 22, 1921; New York City, U.S.
- Died: October 31, 1991 (aged 70); New York City, U.S.
- Occupations: Producer; director
- Spouse(s): Peggy Marie Bennion; Gail Bovard Merrifield
- Children: 5
- Family: Diane Martel (niece)

Joseph Papp (born Joseph Papirofsky; June 22, 1921 – October 31, 1991) was an American theatrical producer and director. Papp is a pioneering figure in American theater, known for creating Shakespeare in the Park, which aimed to make classical theater accessible to all people by producing free-of-charge performances. He was a known advocate for non-traditional and diverse casting practices. He established The Public Theater in what had been the Astor Library Building in Lower Manhattan. There Papp created a year-round producing home to focus on new plays and musicals. Eventually, one of the six performance spaces inside the Public Theater was renamed Joe's Pub in honor of Joseph Papp. It continues to host live performances across a wide range of art forms. Among numerous examples of these were the works of David Rabe, Ntozake Shange's For Colored Girls Who Have Considered Suicide When the Rainbow Is Enuf, Charles Gordone's No Place to Be Somebody (the first off-Broadway play to win the Pulitzer Prize), and Papp's production of Michael Bennett's Pulitzer Prize–winning musical A Chorus Line. Papp also helped to develop other off-Broadway theatres and worked to preserve the historic Broadway Theatre District.

== Early life ==
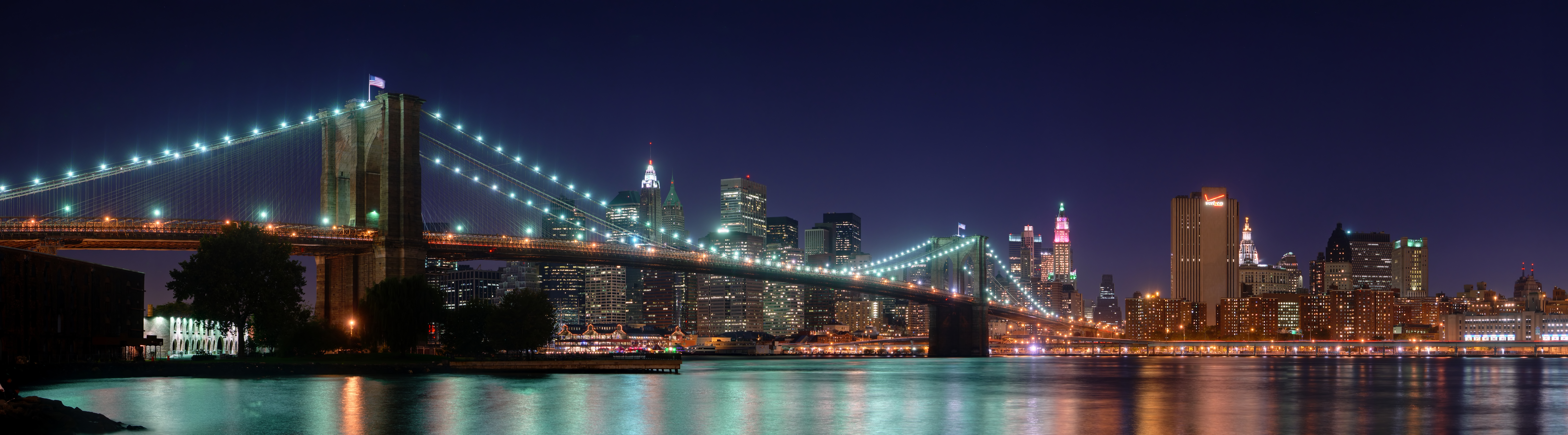
Brooklyn, New York

Papp was born as Joseph Papirofsky in Brooklyn, New York City, the son of Yetta (née Miritch), a seamstress, and Samuel Papirofsky, a trunkmaker. His parents were Jewish immigrants from Russia. (The 2010 documentary film Joe Papp in Five Acts says his mother was a Lithuanian Jew, and his father a Polish Jew, as they immigrated from parts of former Polish–Lithuanian Commonwealth conquered by Russian Empire.) He was a highschool student of Harlem Renaissance playwright Eulalie Spence. In 1941, Papp spent four years in the Pacific Ocean while enlisted in the United States Navy during World War II, and was assigned to special forces. Following his discharge in 1945, Papp joined the Hollywood Actors Laboratory, eventually climbing the ranks and becoming an executive. In 1953, while working as a stage manager for CBS-TV in New York, he started his early workings of what would eventually become Shakespeare in the Park.

== Career ==
Papp founded the New York Shakespeare Festival (now called Shakespeare in the Park) in 1954 with the aim of making Shakespeare's works accessible to the public. In 1957 he was granted the use of Central Park for free productions of Shakespeare's plays. These Shakespeare in the Park productions continue after his death at the open-air Delacorte Theatre every summer in Central Park.

=== Founder of the Public Theater ===
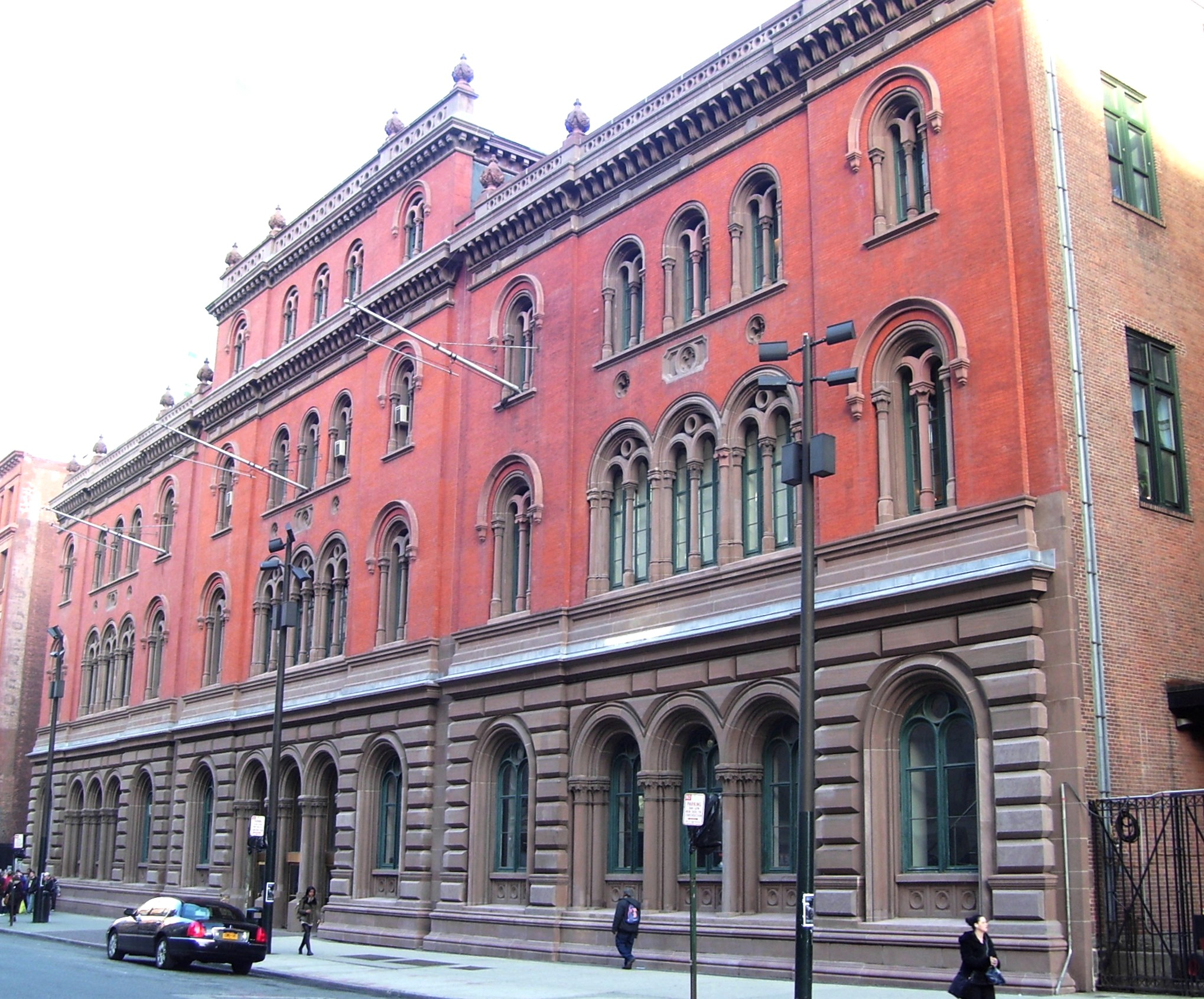
The Public Theater, housed in the Astor Library Building

Papp spent much of his career promoting his idea of free Shakespeare in New York City. His 1956 production of Taming of the Shrew, outdoors in the East River Amphitheatre on New York's Lower East Side, was pivotal for Papp, primarily because critic Brooks Atkinson endorsed Papp's vision in The New York Times. Actress Colleen Dewhurst, who played the leading character, Kate, recalled the effect of this publicity (in an autobiography published posthumously as a collaboration with Tom Viola):

With Brooks Atkinson's blessing, our world changed overnight. Suddenly in our audience of neighbors in T-shirts and jeans appeared men in white shirts, jackets and ties, and ladies in summer dresses. Suddenly we were "the play to see", and everything changed. We were in a hit that would have a positive effect on my career, as well as Joe's, but I missed the shouting. I missed the feeling of not knowing what might happen next or how that play would that night move an audience unafraid of talking back.

By age 41, after Papp had established a permanent base for his free summer Shakespeare performances in Central Park's Delacorte Theater, an open-air amphitheatre, Papp looked for an all-year theater he could make his own. After looking at other locations, he fell in love with the location and the character of Lafayette Street's Astor Library Building. Papp rented it, in 1967, reportedly for one dollar per year, from the city. It was the first building saved from demolition under the New York City landmarks preservation law. After massive renovations, Papp moved his staff to the newly named Public Theater, hoping to attract a newer, less conventional audience for new and innovative playwrights.

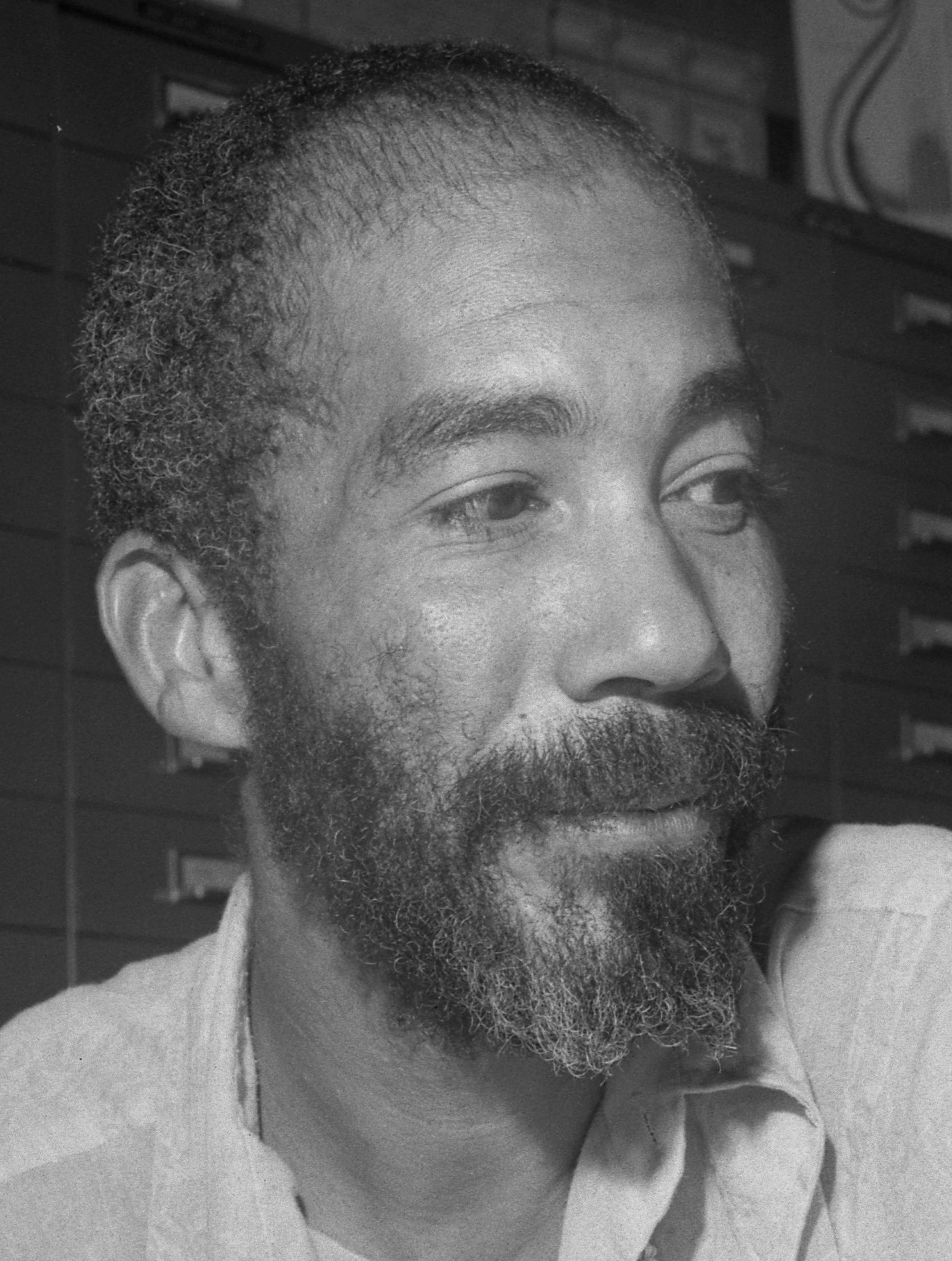
Charles Gordone, the first African American to win the Pulitzer Prize.

At the Public Theater, Papp's focus moved away from the Shakespeare classics and toward new work. Notable Public Theater productions included Charles Gordone's No Place to Be Somebody (the first off-Broadway show, and the first play by an African American to win the Pulitzer Prize) and the plays of David Rabe, Tom Babe and Jason Miller. Papp called his productions of Rabe's plays "the most important thing I did at the Public." Papp's 1985 production of Larry Kramer's play The Normal Heart addressed, in its time, the prejudicial political system which was turning its back on the AIDS crisis and the gay community. Designer Ming Cho Lee commented: "With the new playwrights, the whole direction of the theater changed [but] none of us realized for a while. ... The Public Theater became more important than the Delacorte. The new playwrights became more interesting to Joe than Shakespeare."

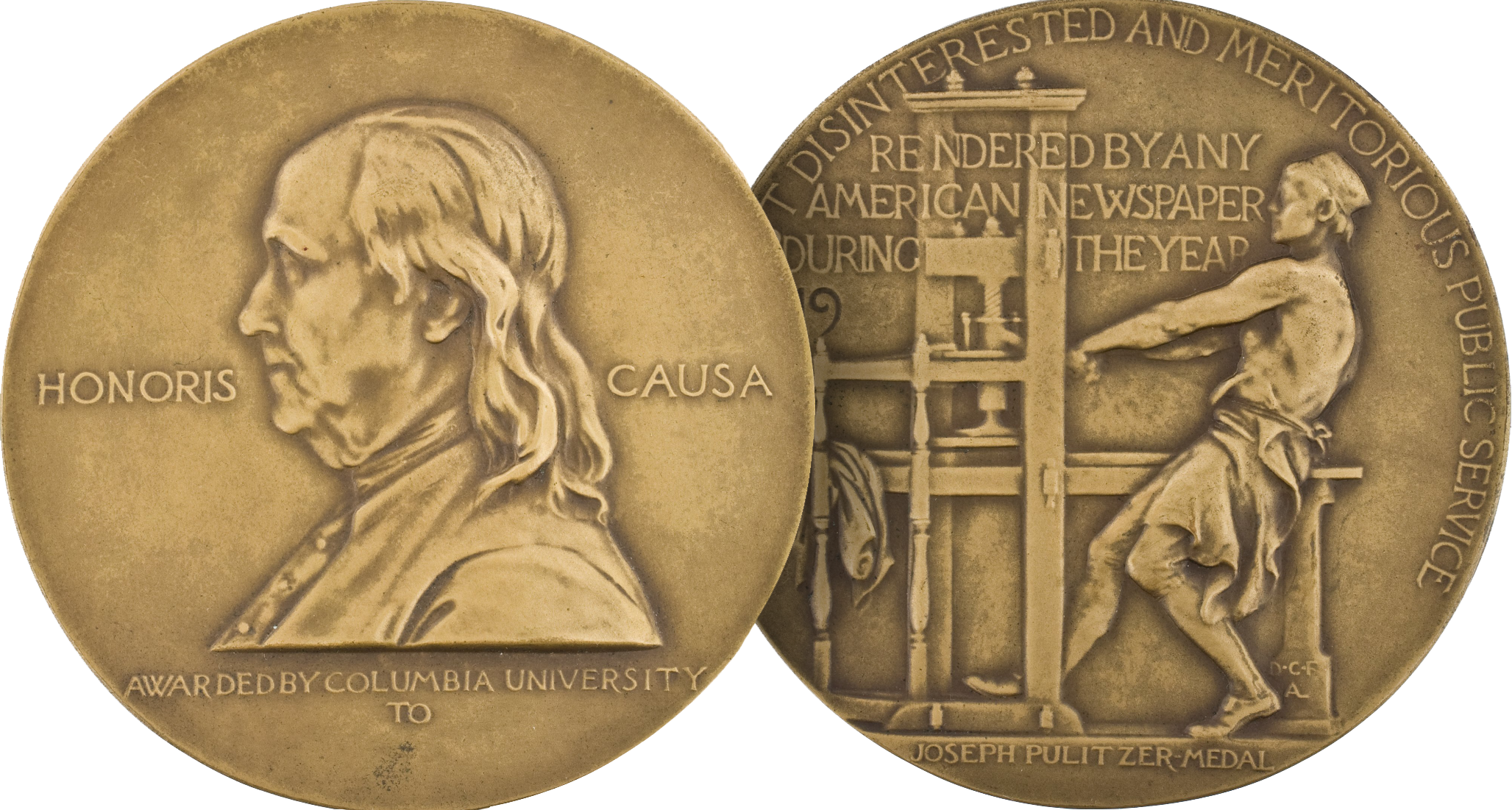
Pulitzer Prize for Drama.

Among all the plays and musicals that Papp produced, he is perhaps best known for four productions that later transferred to Broadway runs: Hair, The Pirates of Penzance, For Colored Girls Who Have Considered Suicide / When the Rainbow Is Enuf and A Chorus Line. The last of these originated with a series of taped interviews, at the Public, of dancers' reminiscences, overseen by director/choreographer Michael Bennett. Papp had not kept the rights to produce Hair, and he did not gain from its Broadway transfer. But he kept the rights to A Chorus Line, and the show's earnings became a continuous financial support for Papp's work. It received 12 Tony Award nominations and won nine of them, including Best Musical, in addition to the 1976 Pulitzer Prize for Drama. It ran for 6,137 performances, becoming the longest-running production in Broadway history up to that time. The show pioneered the workshop system for developing musicals, revolutionizing the way Broadway musicals were created thereafter, and many of the precedents for workshops' aesthetics and contract agreements were set by Papp, Bennett and A Chorus Line.

=== Outdoor performances at the Delacorte Theatre ===
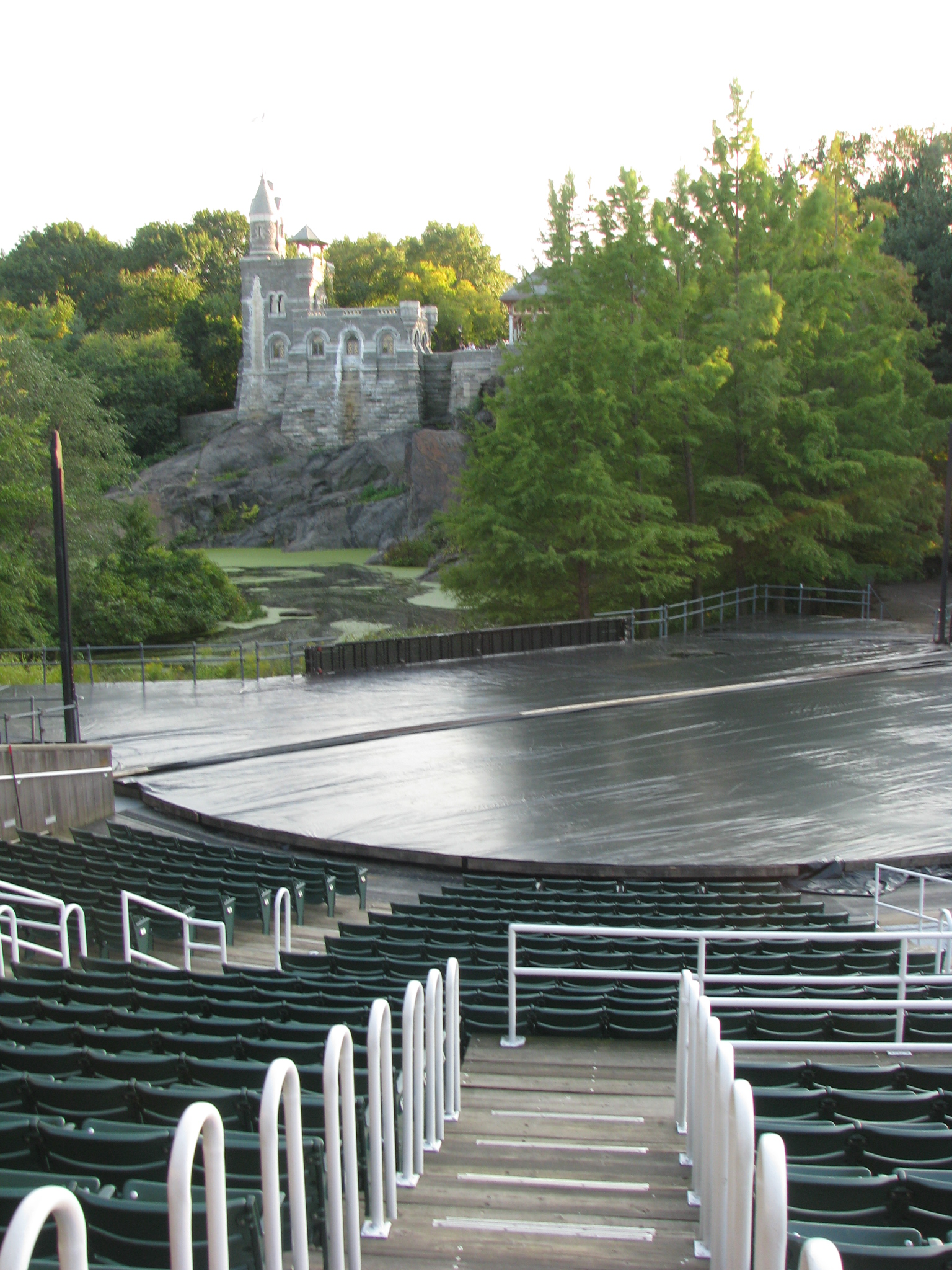
The Delacorte Theater, home of Shakespeare in the Park

Delacorte Theatre productions introduced many new actors and actresses to outdoor Shakespeare and to New York audiences for free. Among the memorable performances (including some from before Papp had the Delacorte for his Shakespeare) were George C. Scott's Obie-award-winning Richard III in 1958; Colleen Dewhurst's Kate, Lady Macbeth, Cleopatra (opposite George C. Scott's Mark Antony), and Gertrude; the Prince Hamlet of Stacy Keach opposite Dewhurst's Gertrude with James Earl Jones' King Claudius, Barnard Hughes's Polonius and Sam Waterston's Laertes; Sam Waterston's Hamlet (opposite the Gertrude of Ruby Dee) with the Laertes of John Lithgow and Andrea Marcovicci's Ophelia; the Benedick and Beatrice of Sam Waterston and Kathleen Widdoes in Much Ado About Nothing with Barnard Hughes's Keystone Cops version of Dogberry; the early work of Meryl Streep as Isabella in Measure for Measure; Mary Beth Hurt as Randall Duk Kim's daughter in Pericles; James Earl Jones as King Lear (1973) with Rosalind Cash and Ellen Holly as his wicked daughters; Raul Julia as Edmund in Jones' 1973 King Lear, as Osric to Keach's Hamlet, and as Proteus (in a musical adaptation of Two Gentlemen of Verona which transferred to a Broadway run). Julia also played Othello with Frances Conroy as his Desdemona and Richard Dreyfuss as Iago. And, in 1968, one year before his breakthrough in The Subject was Roses, Martin Sheen played Romeo. A complete list of the productions through 1995 is available in Joe Papp: An American Life by Helen Epstein.

Shakespeare in the Park was not exclusively for Shakespeare. In the summer of 1977 Gloria Foster was Clytemnestra in the Greek tragedy Agamemnon followed by Raul Julia as Macheath in Richard Foreman's production of Bertolt Brecht/Kurt Weill's The Threepenny Opera, which later transferred to Lincoln Center. Papp was also a Gilbert and Sullivan lover, and in 1980, to commemorate the centenary of The Pirates of Penzance, he mounted a new staging of the operetta at the Delacorte. The show was a sensation, and Papp transferred it to Broadway, where it ran for over 800 performances. It won Tony Awards for Best Revival, Best Director (Wilford Leach), and Best Actor (Kevin Kline). Linda Ronstadt was nominated for Best Actress in a Musical.

=== Fostering the growth of New York theatre ===
Papp fostered other theatre throughout New York City, in particular the development of numerous Off Broadway theatres, often contributing funds from successful Broadway transfers, such as A Chorus Line. These included Theatre for a New Audience, which presented several productions at the Delacourte, and the Riverside Shakespeare Company, in which Papp took a special interest, beginning with the sponsorship of the New York premiere of Brecht's The Life of Edward II of England in 1982, continuing with the financial underwriting of Riverside's New York Parks Tours of Free Shakespeare, including The Comedy of Errors in (1982), Merry Wives of Windsor in 1983, Romeo and Juliet in 1984, and Romeo and Juliet in 1985. In 1983, Papp dedicated the newly renovated theatre of The Shakespeare Center with Helen Hayes.

=== "Save the Theatres" effort ===
Papp took a keen interest in preservation of the historic Broadway/Times Square Theater District. In the early 1980s, he helped lead the "Save the Theatres" movement, and to found "Save the Theatres, Inc.", along with a number of actors, directors, producers and other theatre, film and television personalities. The movement's aim was to preserve vintage playhouses that were then being threatened with demolition by monied Manhattan development interests. Papp's initiative was sparked by the impending demolition in 1982 of the historic Morosco and Helen Hayes theatres, as well as the old Piccadilly Hotel, on West 45th Street.

Although Papp was unsuccessful in saving the Morosco or the Helen Hayes, at his encouragement Congressman Donald J. Mitchell of New York introduced legislation in the United States Congress (97th Congress – H.R.6885) with 13 co-sponsors, (Note: Co-sponsors of the Mitchell bill included: Rep. Michael D. Barnes (MD), Rep. Barber B. Conable, Jr. (NY), Rep. Thomas A. Daschle (SD), Rep. Arlen Erdahl (MN), Rep. David W. Evans (IN), Rep. Hamilton Fish, Jr. (NY), Rep. Thomas M. Foglietta (PA), Rep. Peter A. Peyser (NY), Rep. Peter W. Rodino, Jr. (NJ), Rep. Louis Stokes (OH), Rep. Ted Weiss (NY), Rep. George C. Wortley (NY), and Rep. Ron Wyden (OR).) to designate a "Broadway/Times Square Theatre District National Historic Site" in Manhattan. The Mitchell bill would have required the United States to provide assistance in the preservation of the historical, cultural, and architectural character of the site and in its restoration. It would have directed the National Park Service to designate theatre preservation sites and other appropriate real property within the site as national historic landmarks if they met the criteria for national historic landmarks, and would have prohibited the demolition or alteration of real property located within the site unless such demolition or alteration would contribute to the preservation, restoration, or enhancement of the site for traditional legitimate theatre purposes. Among other things, it would have established a Federally chartered citizens advisory group to be chaired by Papp, known as the "Broadway/Times Square Theatre District Preservation Commission".

Faced with fierce opposition and extensive lobbying against its passage by Mayor Ed Koch's administration and Manhattan developers, the bill was not enacted into law, but the ultimate effect of the "Save the Theatres" effort was to slow destruction of the old Theater District enough to eventually ensure preservation of a number of other historic playhouses and a measure of the District's original atmosphere and historic character.

== Death ==
Joseph Papp died of prostate cancer at age 70, on October 31, 1991. He is buried in the Baron Hirsch Cemetery on Staten Island. His son, Tony, died of complications of AIDS only months before Joseph Papp's death. Papp was survived by his fourth wife, Gail Merrifield Papp, a partner in The Public Theater.

== Challenges and Controversies ==
=== Getting fired from CBS ===
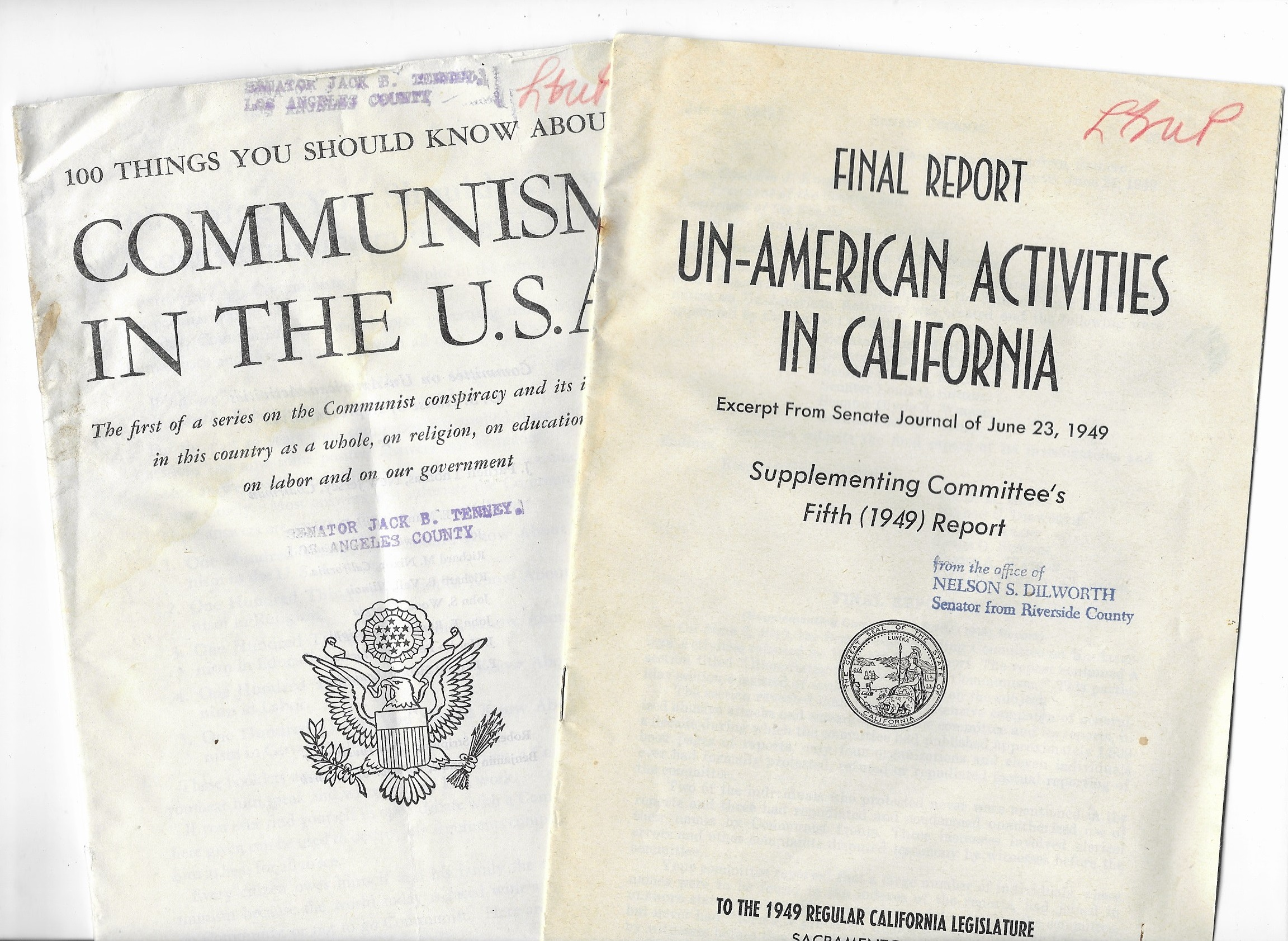
The covers of the report "Communism in the U.S.A." by the U.S. House Un-American Activities Committee and the Supplement to the 5th Report by the California Un-American Activities Committee.

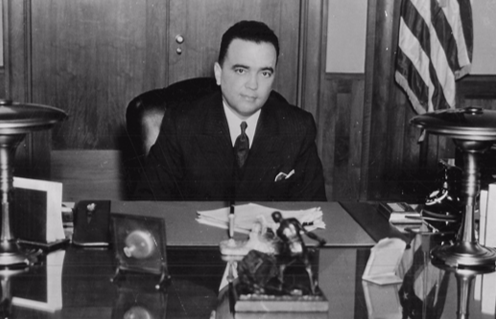
J. Edgar Hoover

In 1958, Papp invoked his Fifth Amendment right before the House Un-American Activities Committee (HUAC), which subsequently resulted in the loss of his position at CBS as a stage manager. He refused to answer questions about his association with political parties and his political beliefs to avoid self-incrimination. This incident occurred during a tense period of anti-communist sentiment in the United States, when many individuals in media and the arts were scrutinized for any communist beliefs and affiliations. J. Edgar Hoover, the FBI director at the time, accused CBS of using their platform to allegedly promote socialist views and publicly criticized them for it. This led to the CBS network terminating staff members that had any alleged communist ties, including Papp. With the aid of his union, the International Alliance of Theatrical Stage Employees, Papp was able to get reinstated to his prior position as a stage manager.

=== Standoff with Parks Commissioner Robert Moses ===
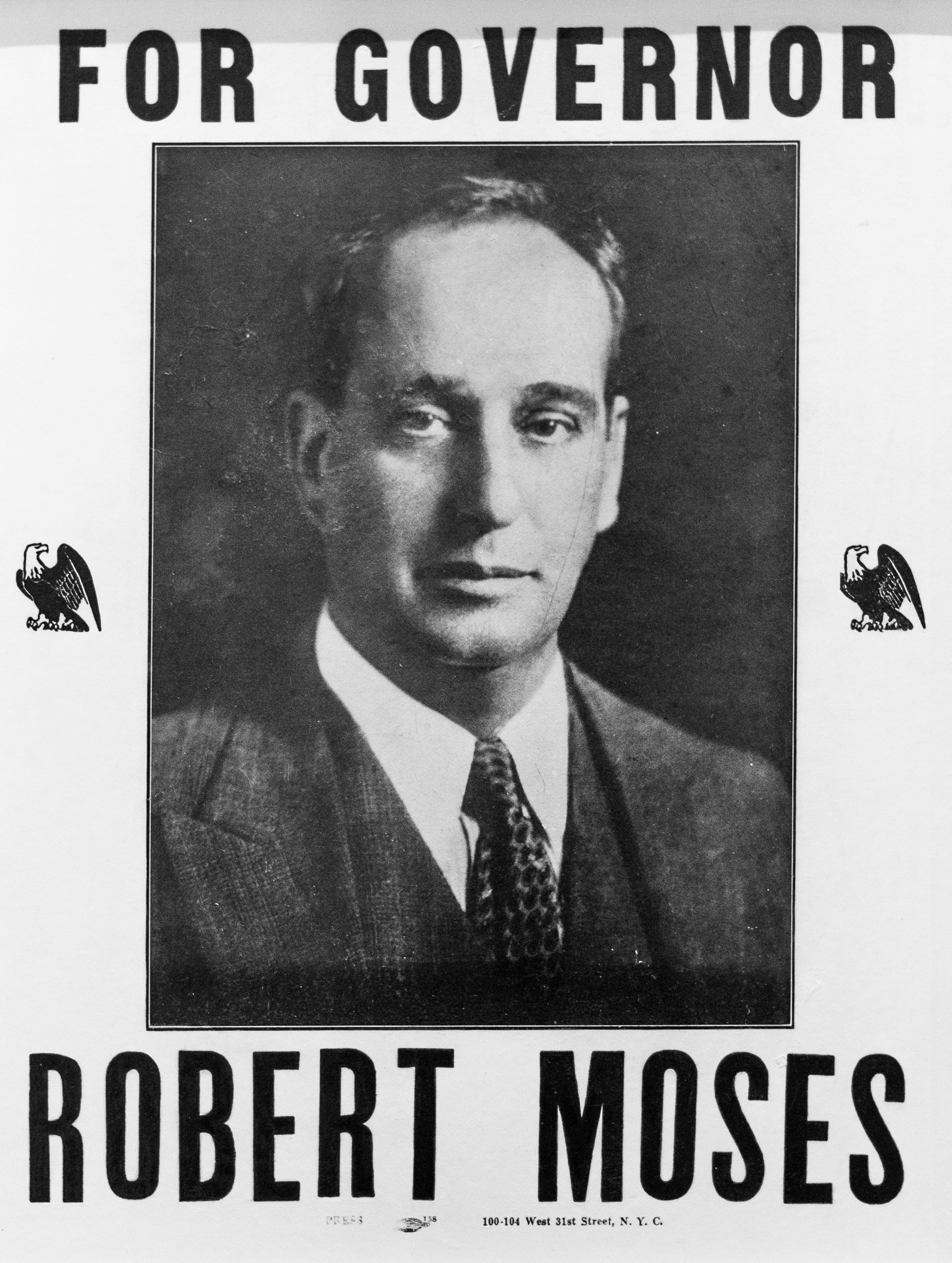
Robert Moses

In the late 1950s, following the first two successful free Shakespeare performances in Central Park, Papp faced backlash from New York City Parks Commissioner Robert Moses. Moses insisted that Papp begin charging admission to offset damage to the park's grass, which Papp refused. Papp contended that the impact on the grass was no greater than that caused by recreational sports played in the park. He maintained that theater should remain free and accessible to everyone. The dispute eventually became public, with allegations that Moses attempted to discredit Papp by leaking claims about his political affiliations to the press. With the support of well known public figures like Eleanor Roosevelt and the majority of the press and general public, Papp came out on top in court and in public opinion. As a result, Moses changed his opinion and insisted on creating a permanent venue known as the Delacorte Theater, which has become the long-term home of Shakespeare in the Park since 1962.

=== Non-traditional casting ===
Papp was a pioneer in a commitment to non-traditional casting, using a variety of ethnicities and colors of actors in his new plays and Shakespeare productions. The father of a gay son, Tony, Papp aligned himself with gay and lesbian concerns in at least two specific instances. He fought anti-obscenity provisions that Congress briefly imposed on the National Endowment for the Arts during the Reagan Presidency, and he chose to produce The Normal Heart, which decried institutionalized "homophobia" as well as Mayor Koch's response to the AIDS crisis.

== Legacy ==
In large part due to the "Save the Theatres" preservation effort led by Papp in the 1980s, the Theater District remains one of New York City's primary and most popular tourist attractions and destinations today.

In 2000 the Joseph Papp Children's Humanitarian Fund was founded. The Fund serves as the humanitarian arm of international Jewish children's club Tzivos Hashem's activities in Ukraine. Papp, along with Rabbi Marc Schneier, co-founded the Foundation for Ethnic Understanding to strengthen ties between Blacks and Jews.

Papp's biography Joe Papp: An American Life was written by journalist Helen Epstein and published in 1996.

Joe's Pub is a music and performance venue operated as part of The Public Theater in New York City. Since its opening in 1998, it has served as a platform for both emerging and established performers. The venue is known for hosting a range of programming, including artist development initiatives such as New York Voices, which commissions original works by musicians, and the Joe's Pub Working Group, which provides support for artist growth. Each year, the space hosts around 800 performances and draws more than 100,000 attendees.

William Finn's 2003 album Elegies: A Song Cycle includes the song "Joe Papp," dedicated to Papp's contributions to New York theatre and personal friendship with Finn.

=== Recognition ===
- 1986: Received the Golden Plate Award of the American Academy of Achievement.
- 1992: The Public Theater, home of the New York Shakespeare Festival, renamed the Joseph Papp Public Theater in honor of its founder.
- 2017: The intersection of Lafayette Street and Astor Place, the longtime home of Public Theater, co-named in honor of the Public's founder, Joseph Papp.

== See also ==
- Edward Cornell
