= John Bird Burnham =

American conservationist and entrepreneur

John Bird Burnham (March 16, 1869-1939) was a conservationist and entrepreneur who founded the Crater Club off of Whallons Bay on Lake Champlain in 1899.

Born in Newcastle, Delaware, he worked in New York City as editor of Forest and Stream from 1881 to 1887, where he wrote many articles advocating for game protection. In 1898 he bought a home in Willsboro, New York, and turned it into the Highlands Game Preserve. Despite lacking training as an architect or as a builder, he nevertheless designed and built some seventy cabins and cottages, along with club buildings. By 1905, he also established a maple sugar and maple candy business, the Adirondack Mountain Creams factory Essex, New York.

He led a campaign for passage of a federal migratory bird law, the Weeks-McLean Law (passed in 1913) as well as a migratory bird treaty with Canada. Burnham was also a noted adventurer, having traveled the Yukon as a young man, and in his fifties he led an expedition to Siberia to collect specimens of the Marco Polo sheep in 1921.
