= Crater Club =

Coordinates: 44°17′0″N 73°21′0″W

The Crater Club is a seasonal residential enclave on the shore of Lake Champlain approximately one mile south of Essex, New York within the Adirondack Park region. The club was originally developed as a summer retreat by the naturalist and outdoor writer John Bird Burnham in the early 1900s. Currently the Crater Club consists of over 40 homes, a clubhouse, playing fields, four clay tennis courts, and a waterfront featuring a permanent pier and a screened building known as Burnham's Landing. This latter building is also the headquarters of the Split Rock Yacht Club, which maintains a small but active racing fleet of Cape Cod Knockabout sailboats and holds weekly sailboat races during the summer season open to these and other small one-design classes.

Like the Scouting Movement, the Crater Club is an example of the American movement that embraced basic, "frontier" values in contrast to the rampant urbanization and industrialization of the late 19th and early 20th centuries. Early members purchased lots from Burnham then built simple cottages that deliberately eschewed the luxuries and decorative excesses of Adirondack "Great Camps" such as those designed by William L. Coulter of Saranac Lake. Crater Club members swam, sailed small boats, and hiked for pleasure, believing in the salubrious effects of exposure to Nature on work-wearied urbanites and their children. Although many of the early residents were in business, others were academics and other professionals. A number of books have been produced by Crater Club residents during their sojourns there, and the club and its facilities still provide a warm community for families seeking a quiet and unassuming place to vacation and recharge in the summer months.
