= Essex, New York =

- Town
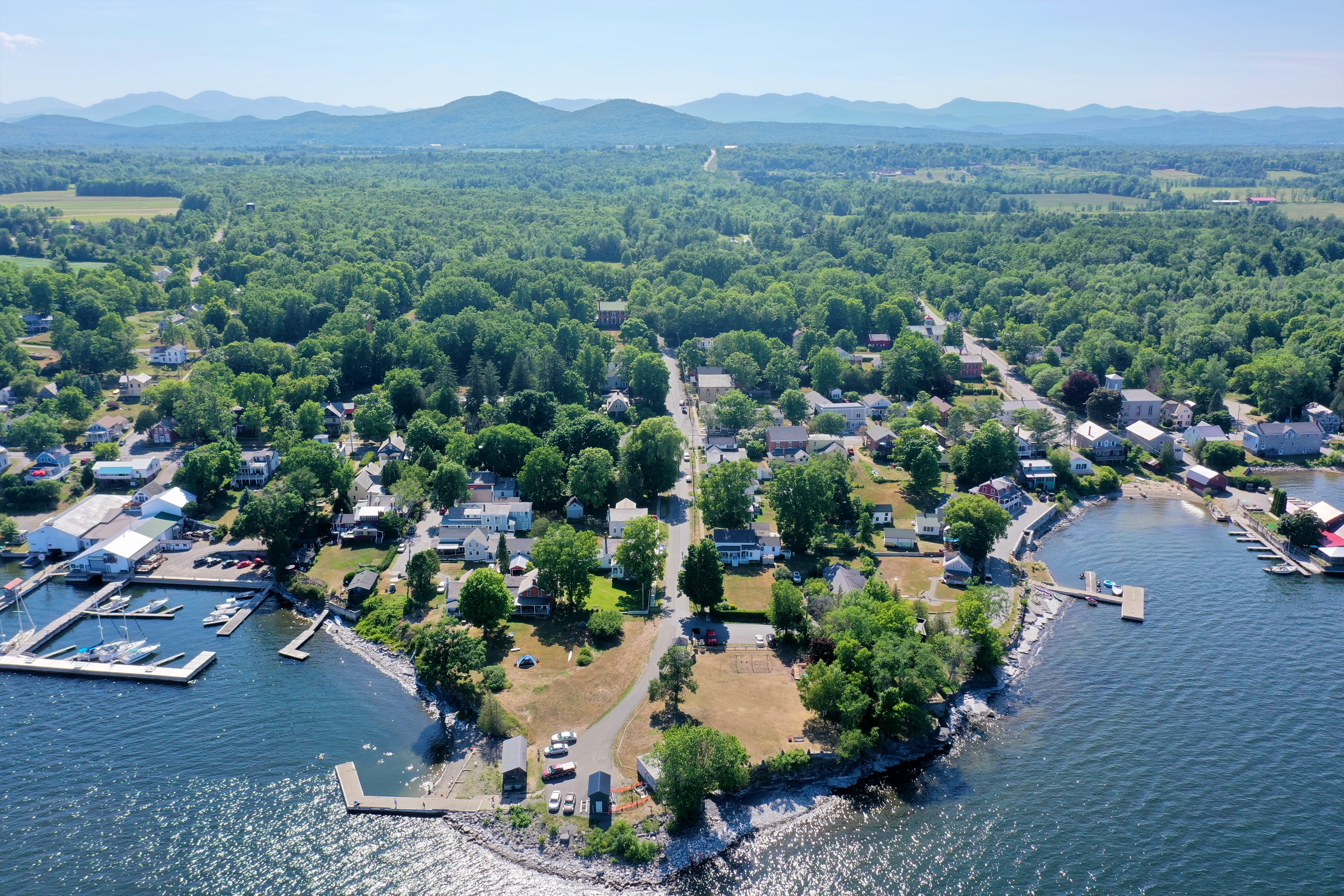
- Essex, New York, as seen from above Lake Champlain and off Begg's Point

- Location in Essex County and the state of New York
- Coordinates: 44°16′41″N 73°24′35″W
- Country: United States
- State: New York
- County: Essex
- Established: April 4, 1805

Government
  - Type: Town Council
  - Town Supervisor: Ken Hughes
  - Town Council: Members' list: • Scott Hurlburt; • Erin Hall; • Ron Jackson (Deputy Supervisor)

Area
  - Total: 37.60 sq mi (97.38 km^{2})
  - Land: 31.63 sq mi (81.92 km^{2})
  - Water: 5.97 sq mi (15.46 km^{2})
- Elevation: 266 ft (81 m)

Population (2020)
  - Total: 621
  - Density: 20.3/sq mi (7.84/km^{2})
- Time zone: UTC-5 (Eastern (EST))
  - Summer (DST): UTC-4 (EDT)
- ZIP Codes: 12936 (Essex); 12993 (Westport)
- Area code: 518
- FIPS code: 36-031-24768
- GNIS feature ID: 0978946
- Website: www.essexnewyork.com

Essex is a town in Essex County, New York, United States overlooking Lake Champlain. The population was 621 at the 2020 census. The town is named after locations in England.

The town is on the eastern edge of the county. It is 17 miles (27 km) south-southwest of Burlington, Vermont, which is on the opposite shore of Lake Champlain, 32 miles (51 km) south of Plattsburgh, 94 miles (151 km) south of Montreal, Quebec, and 135 miles (217 km) north of Albany. Essex is inside the Adirondack Park.

== History ==
At the time of first European contact ca. 1530, the area on the western shores of Lake Champlain were inhabited by Mohawk people of the Iroquois confederacy, with substantial Abenaki (Algonquian) contact.

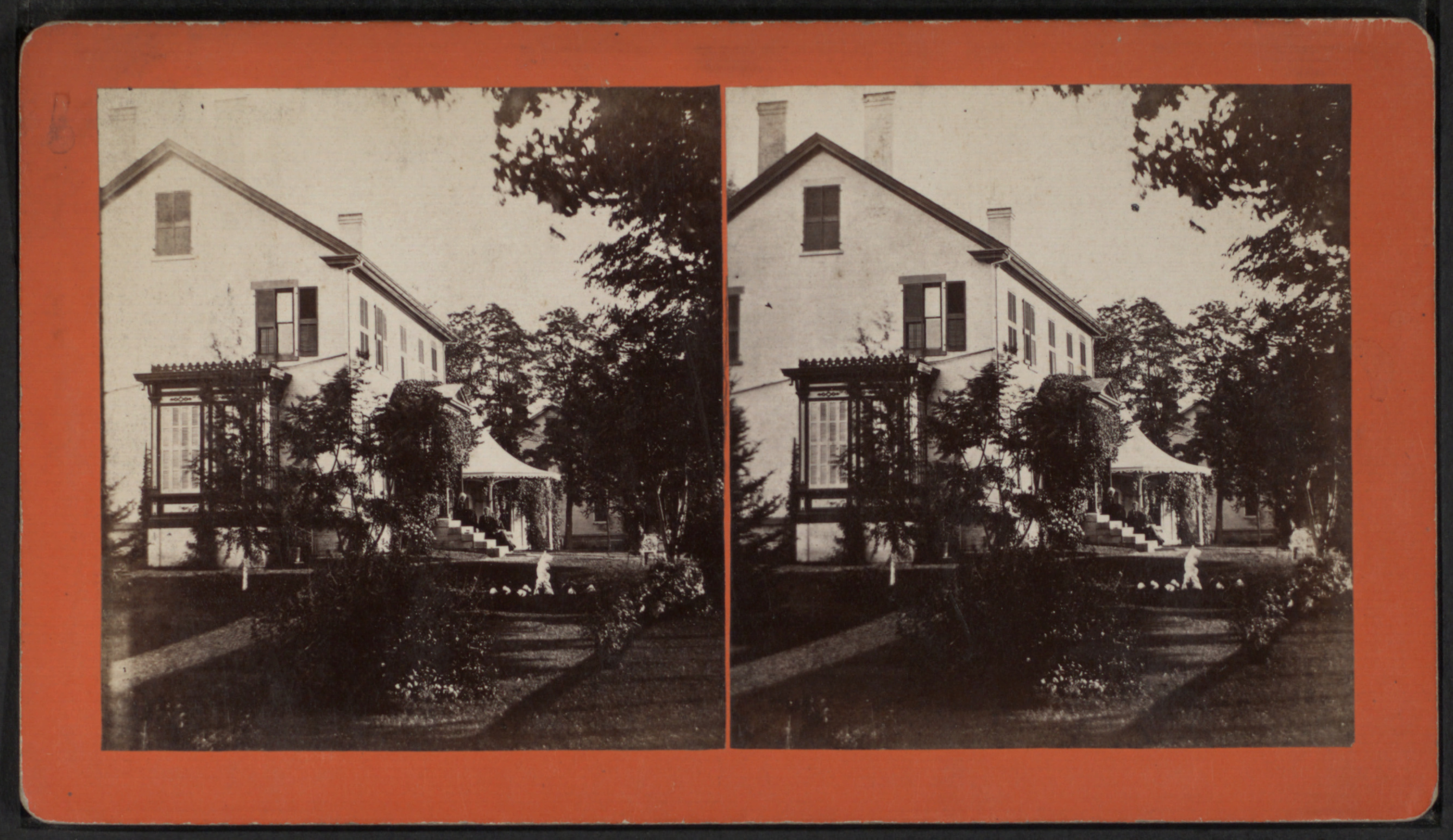
View of a home in Essex circa 1875

Essex was part of a land grant made to Louis Joseph Robart by King Louis XV of France. The land grant was lost after the British took over the region after 1763.

The region was first settled around 1765 with the intention of forming a baronial estate like those of the lower Hudson River for landowner and investor, William Gilliland.

The town was formed from a part of the town of Willsboro in 1805. It was an important shipbuilding location and port, but that economy collapsed after 1849 with the beginning of railroad lines in the region.

The Essex Village Historic District, Foothills Baptist Church, and the Octagonal Schoolhouse are listed on the National Register of Historic Places.

== Geography ==
According to the United States Census Bureau, the town has a total area of 37.6 square miles (97.4 km^{2}), of which 31.6 square miles (81.9 km^{2}) is land and 6.0 square miles (15.5 km^{2}), or 15.88%, is water.

The eastern border of Essex is the Vermont state line in the middle of Lake Champlain.

New York State Route 22 is a north–south highway in Essex.

== Demographics ==
Historical population
Census	Pop.	Note	%±
1820	1,223		—
1830	1,543		26.2%
1840	1,681		8.9%
1850	2,351		39.9%
1860	1,633		−30.5%
1870	1,600		−2.0%
1880	1,462		−8.6%
1890	1,437		−1.7%
1900	1,333		−7.2%
1910	1,276		−4.3%
1920	1,025		−19.7%
1930	1,116		8.9%
1940	1,002		−10.2%
1950	1,012		1.0%
1960	880		−13.0%
1970	837		−4.9%
1980	880		5.1%
1990	687		−21.9%
2000	713		3.8%
2010	671		−5.9%
2020	621		−7.5%

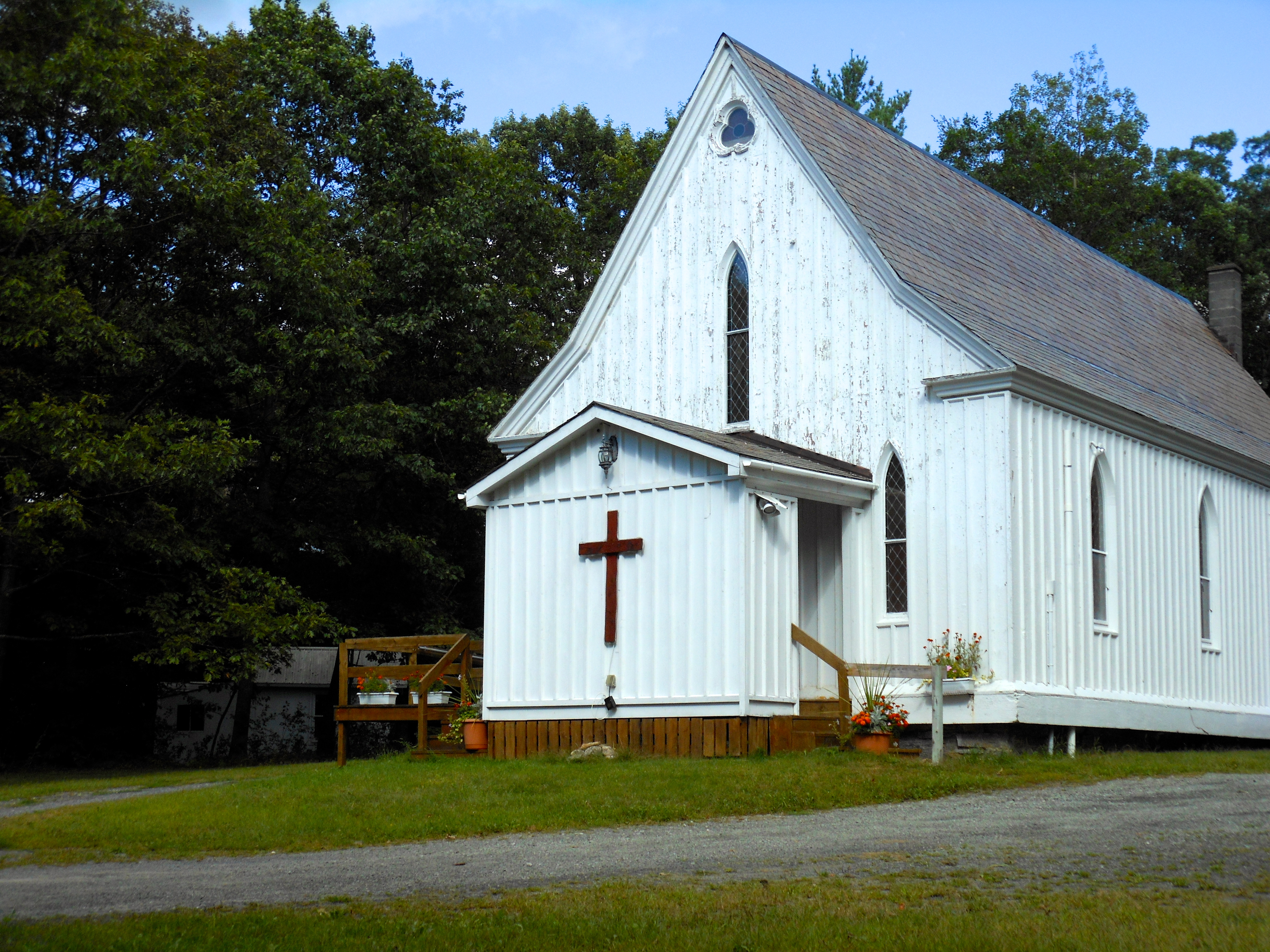
The Foothills Baptist Church in Boquet

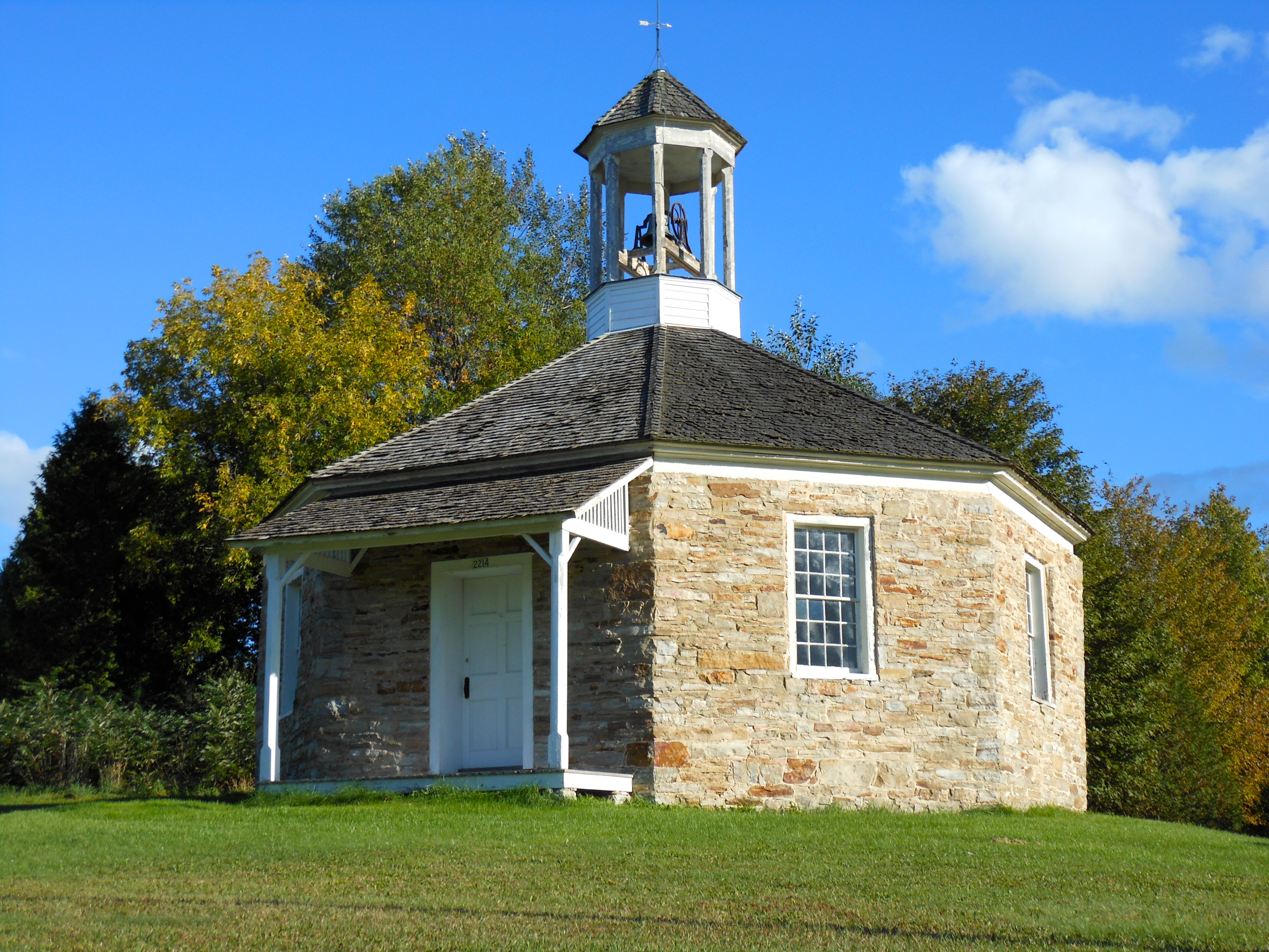
The Octagonal Schoolhouse in the hamlet of Boquet

As of the census of 2000, there were 713 people, 302 households, and 202 families residing in the town. The population density was 22.5 inhabitants per square mile (8.7/km^{2}). There were 522 housing units at an average density of 16.5 per square mile (6.4/km^{2}). The racial makeup of the town was 99.7% White, 0.1% Native American, and 0.1% from two or more races. Hispanic or Latino of any race were 0.1% of the population.

There were 302 households, out of which 24.2% had children under the age of 18 living with them, 51.0% were married couples living together, 9.9% had a female householder with no husband present, and 33.1% were non-families. 27.5% of all households were made up of individuals, and 12.3% had someone living alone who was 65 years of age or older. The average household size was 2.35 and the average family size was 2.79.

In the town, the population was spread out, with 21.3% under the age of 18, 5.3% from 18 to 24, 23.8% from 25 to 44, 29.0% from 45 to 64, and 20.5% who were 65 years of age or older. The median age was 45 years. For every 100 females, there were 105.5 males. For every 100 females age 18 and over, there were 98.2 males.

The median income for a household in the town was $37,596, and the median income for a family was $40,104. Males had a median income of $26,905 versus $19,583 for females. The per capita income for the town was $20,087. About 10.8% of families and 11.0% of the population were below the poverty line, including 15.1% of those under age 18 and 9.5% of those age 65 or over.

== Government ==
The Town of Essex is a municipal corporation governed by a five-member elected town board. The board is composed of one Supervisor (two-year term beginning every even-numbered year) and four Councilmembers (four terms, of which two begin concurrently with each new supervisor term). The Town Clerk is an elected two-year term position, beginning every even numbered year. The Highway Superintendent is an elected two-year term position beginning every even numbered year and is run independently from the Town Board, except for receiving annual funding of the Highway Department budget. The Town Justice is an elected four-year position and is run independently from the Town Board, except for receiving funds on a monthly basis. There are three duly elected Assessors who each serve a four-year term, with two of them staggering their term two years apart from the other.

== Education and culture ==
Most of Essex is served by Willsboro Central School District, though the Boquet Valley Central School is also used. Additionally, some travel across Lake Champlain to Vermont or drive north to Plattsburgh for private school.

For twenty years, the Essex Theatre Company, located near the ferry dock in the Masonic Lodge, has continuously produced stage plays and broadway musicals for summertime enjoyment – and also occasional winter entertainment programs.

The entire town is situated among quaint shops, cafes, and restaurants. Most notable for their placement on the National Register of Historic Places, the entire town is included on the Registry.

Periodically there are adult education programs, such as a history lecture series, at the Whallonsburgh Grange.

== Recreation ==
There are a wide variety of year-round recreational offerings. Cycling is popular in many parts of Essex. Whallons Bay Road offers views of both Vermont and the Adirondack High Peaks, with smooth roads and moderate hills. Walker Road is also a bike route, which sees Essex residents riding from the historic hamlet to Dogwood Bakery in Wadhams via this route on the weekends. Route 22 is part of the Empire State Trail, which officially opened in 2020. Hikers can access small mountains, forests and fields via the Champlain Area Trails (CATS) trails, which wind for dozens of miles throughout Essex. The Essex Quarry Trail, at the top of Bull Run in Essex, allows visitors to see the remains of a once-active quarry in a woodland. Infrequently traveled side roads throughout the entire town lend themselves to casual walks. On the lake, sailing, swimming, stand-up paddleboarding (SUPs) and kayaking are summer pastimes. Both Lake Champlain and the Boquet River have areas for anglers of all ages.

== Public transport ==
Air service transport is provided by Plattsburgh International Airport (30 miles to the north), and Burlington International Airport (across the lake via the ferry in Essex, to Charlotte, Vermont). Both are within easy driving distance. Burlington International Airport serves international customers, and Plattsburgh International Airport serves regional and national carriers.

Ferry service between Essex and Charlotte, Vermont, is provided by the Lake Champlain Transportation Company. This became a year-round route in 1998.

This route is used by many residents for access to medical care, jobs, school, and shopping. While most years in the past decade the ferry service has run year-round, the ice-breaking ferries usually used on this route were redeployed to Crown Point to fill in for the Champlain Bridge which was demolished in 2009.

The first ferry service in Essex began operation circa 1790.

Amtrak service is available in Westport, 10 miles (16 km) to the south.

In the days of peak train service, local Delaware & Hudson Railway trains ending at Plattsburgh or at Rouses Point made stops in Essex, but not the named trains, Laurentian, or its overnight counterpart, the Montreal Limited.

== Access to medical care ==
Essex is in a rural area in the Adirondack Park, so most of its access to medical care is via the ferry operated by Lake Champlain Transportation. The nearest emergency department is Elizabethtown Community Hospital, a 25-bed rural hospital with eighteen on its active medical staff, which is a 17-mile (27 km) drive. Further away, accessible via 20-minute ferry and a significant drive, is the emergency department of Fletcher Allen Hospital, a large, full-service hospital affiliated with the University of Vermont. An important fully staffed hospital and full-service emergency department is at CVPH Medical Center, in Plattsburgh, approximately 35 miles (56 km) to the north.

== Communities and locations in Essex ==
- Beggs Point – Small point in the hamlet of Essex. Horseshoe nail and window sash factories were located here before burning down in the early 1900s. Now the town park with playground, fishing pier and boat launch. Sunrise religious services for Easter.
- Boquet River – Its southern branch flows northward through the center portion of the town.
- Boquet (formally West Essex or Wessex) – A hamlet on NY-22 west of Essex.
- Brookfield – A former hamlet in the western part of Essex settled in 1797 by mostly Morris County, New Jersey, and Dutchess County, New York, farmers and bloomers. Cemetery still exists.
- Bluff Point – A point in the southeast portion of Essex hamlet. Lake depth drops to 100 feet (30 m) off the cliff.
- Bull Run – The hill on south Main Street traveling into Essex hamlet.
- Crooked S Hill – The hill west of Boquet after crossing the Boquet River. Named from the appearance of Jersey Street (County Road 12) as it twists up the hill.
- Grog Harbor – A shallow bay south of Split Rock Point. Named when liquor smugglers had to dump their cargo.
- Cannon Point – A shallow projection into Lake Champlain at the Crater Club.
- Crater Club – A hamlet on the shore of Lake Champlain, south of Essex hamlet on County Road 80.
- Essex (formerly "Elizabeth") – The hamlet of Essex on the shore of Lake Champlain at the junction of NY-22 and County Road 80. The hamlet is the location of the town government and is a ferry port to Vermont. The village was the first county seat of Essex County when it was formed in 1799 until 1807, when Elizabethtown became the county seat. It was founded about 1765. The Essex Village Historic District encompasses many of the historic buildings.
- Essex Station (also known as Merriam Station) – A location southwest of Essex hamlet on NY-22.
- Sandy Beach – A private small sand beach in the northeast part of Essex hamlet.
- Split Rock Point – The easternmost extension of the town into Lake Champlain. A privately owned lighthouse operates year-round.
- Whallonsburg – A hamlet in the southern part of the town on NY-22. It was founded about 1770 before a fire in the early 1900s, the hamlet produced furniture and other wood products. The Essex County Home and Farm was listed on the National Register of Historic Places in 1982. The Whallonsburg Grange Hall is a very popular cultural and educational center.
- Whallons Bay – A bay of Lake Champlain in the southeast part of Essex. This bay is very popular for mooring sailboats owned by local residents. A small parking area across the street leads to a tunnel under the road which grants access to the bay.

== Notable people ==
Some notable Essex residents, past and present, include:

- Millicent Kittredge Blake (1822–1907), educator
- Edward Cornell (1944—2025), theatre director, artist, & sculptor
- Sid Couchey (1919–2012), cartoonist
- George Hearn (born 1934), actor
- Sergeant Frederick Jarvis (1841–1894), soldier and Medal of Honor recipient
- Steven Kellogg, children's book author
- John L. Merriam (1825–1895), Minnesota banker, politician and Speaker of the Minnesota House of Representatives
- George Pataki (born 1945), the 53rd governor of New York
- Henry H. Ross (1790–1862), congressman from New York
- Peter C. Schultz, co-inventor of fiber optics
- Eugene Franklin Skinner (1809–1864), a pioneer, after whom is named Eugene, Oregon
- Reuben Whallon (1776–1843), congressman from New York
