= Foothills Baptist Church (Essex, New York) =

Historic church in New York, United States

- Church of the Nazarene
- U.S. National Register of Historic Places
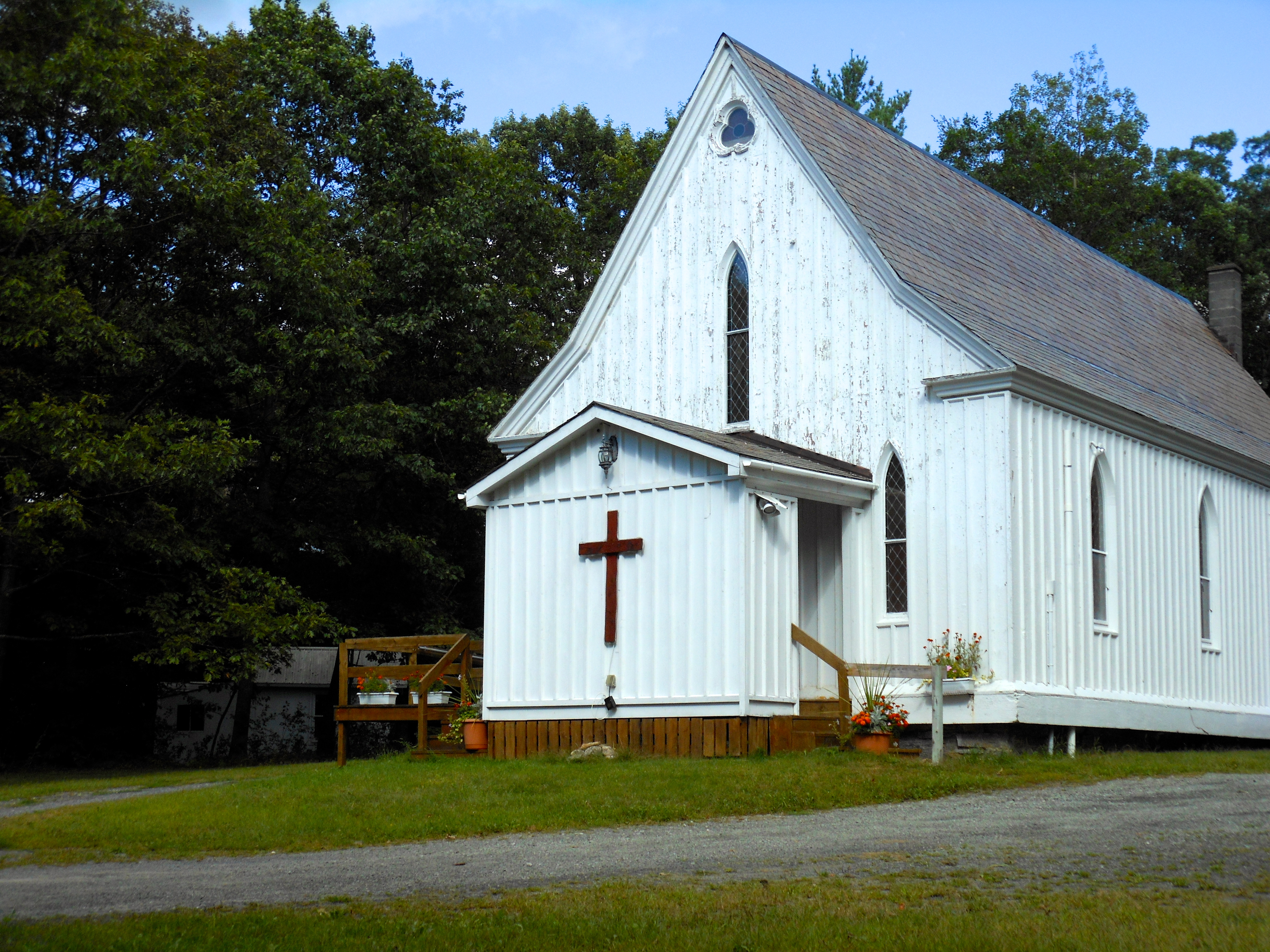

- Location within New York Location within the United States
- Location: 2172 New York Route 22, Boquet, Essex, New York
- Nearest city: Essex, New York
- Coordinates: 44°18′7″N 73°24′7″W
- Built: 1855
- Architect: Follows a design by Richard Upjohn
- NRHP reference No.: 73001189
- Added to NRHP: June 19, 1973

Foothills Baptist Church is an historic Carpenter Gothic church located at 2172 New York Route 22 in the Boquet section of Essex, New York, in the United States. Built in 1855 as St. John's Episcopal Church, it became the Union Church at Boquet Chapel in 1880, the Church of the Nazarene in 1949 and Foothills Baptist Church in 2005. It has also been known as Boquet Chapel.

The church was listed on the National Register of Historic Places as the Church of the Nazarene in 1973. It was listed for its architecture: the church follows a published design by architect Richard Upjohn, and was described as being "remarkably untouched and yet well-maintained example of the simplest of Richard Upjohn's standard ecclesiastical designs."

== History ==
The Boquet Chapel was built in 1855 for St. John's Episcopal Church, three years after the publication of Upjohn's Rural Architecture in which the design appears. In 1880 St. John's built a new church in Essex and sold the chapel to the Union Church at Boquet Chapel composed of Presbyterians and Baptists, which used it until 1922 when it was closed. It was reopened in 1949 as the Church of the Nazarene. In 2005 it was dedicated as the Foothills Baptist Church.

It is located W of Essex on NY 22, Essex.

== See also ==
- List of Registered Historic Places in Essex County, New York
- Church of the Nazarene
