= Essex Village Historic District =

Historic district in New York, United States

- U.S. National Register of Historic Places
- U.S. Historic district
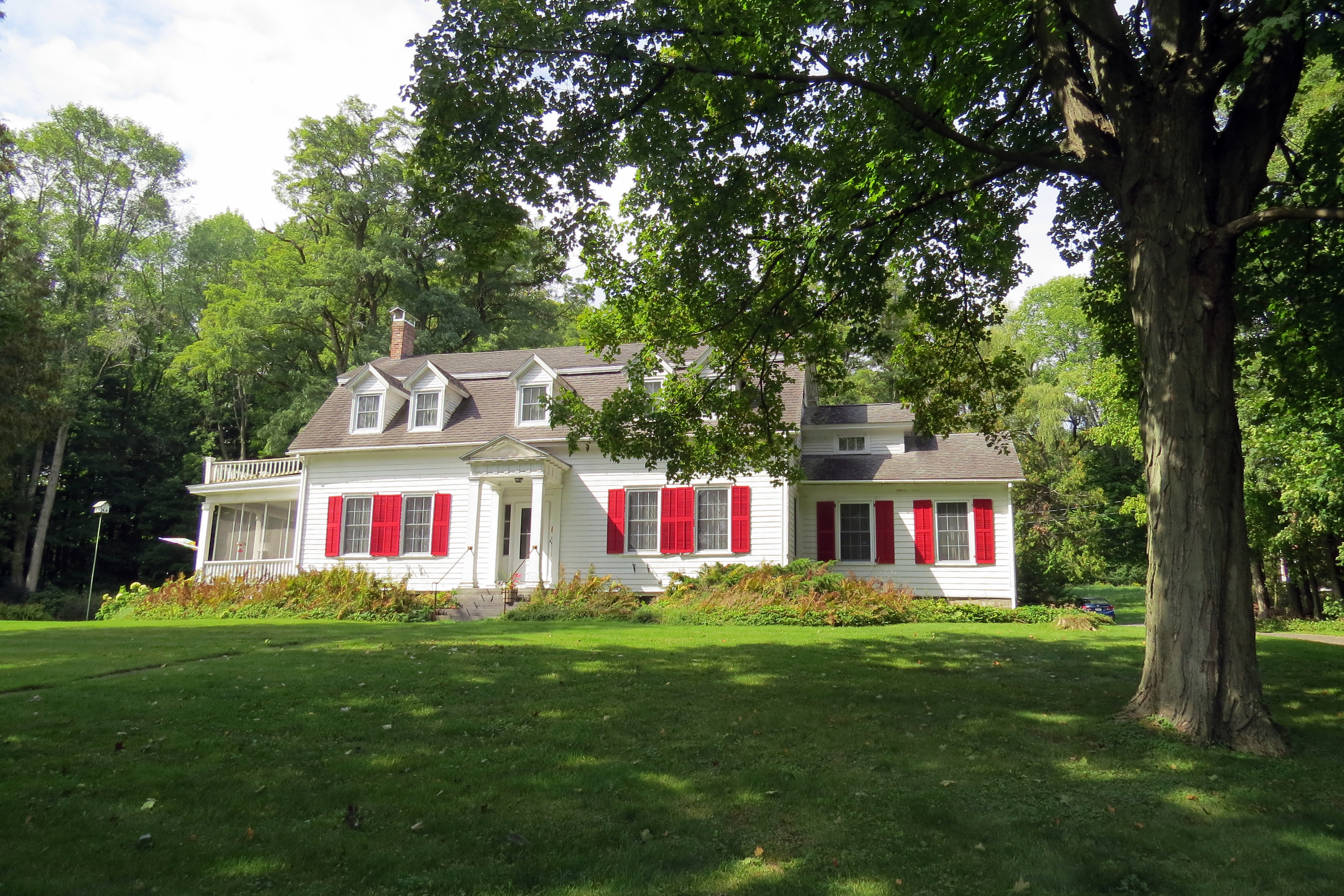
- The Dower House, built before 1793

- Location within New York Location within the United States
- Nearest city: Essex, New York
- Coordinates: 44°18′44″N 73°21′10″W
- Area: 48 acres (19 ha)
- Architect: Multiple
- Architectural style: Greek Revival, Late Victorian, Federal
- NRHP reference No.: 75001187
- Added to NRHP: May 28, 1975

Essex Village Historic District is a national historic district located at Essex in Essex County, New York. The district contains 150 contributing buildings. It encompasses the historic core of the hamlet of Essex and primarily contains early-19th-century buildings. The predominant building materials are clapboarded wood frame, brick, and stone and none of the buildings exceed 2 1/2 stories in height. The oldest documented structure is Dower House, built prior to 1793. Other notable buildings include Wright's Inn (1798), Essex Free Library (1818), and "Hickory Hill" (1822), "Rosslyn" (ca. 1830), the "Old Brick Schoolhouse" (1830), and "Greystone" (1853).

It was listed on the National Register of Historic Places in 1975.

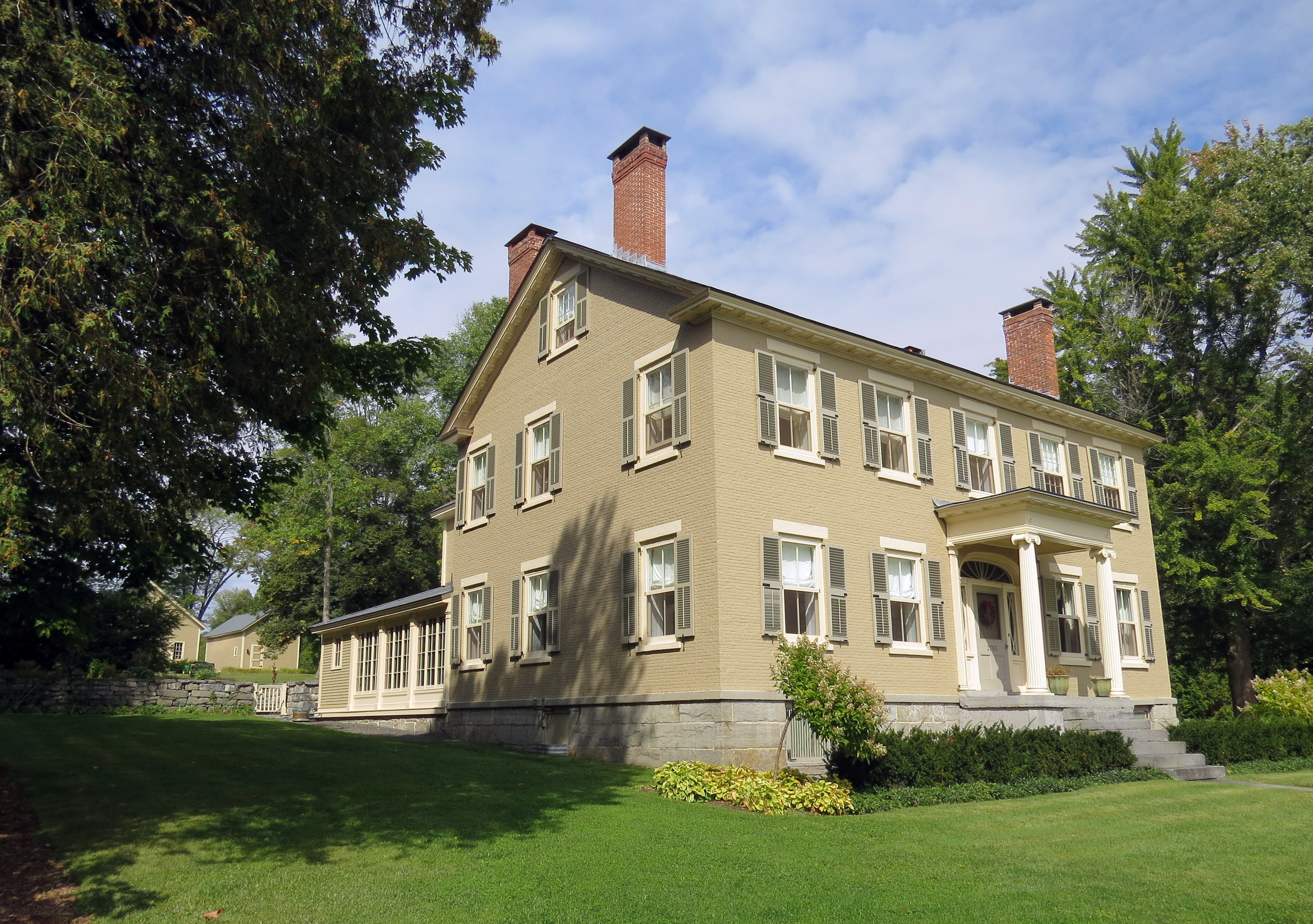
Rosslyn

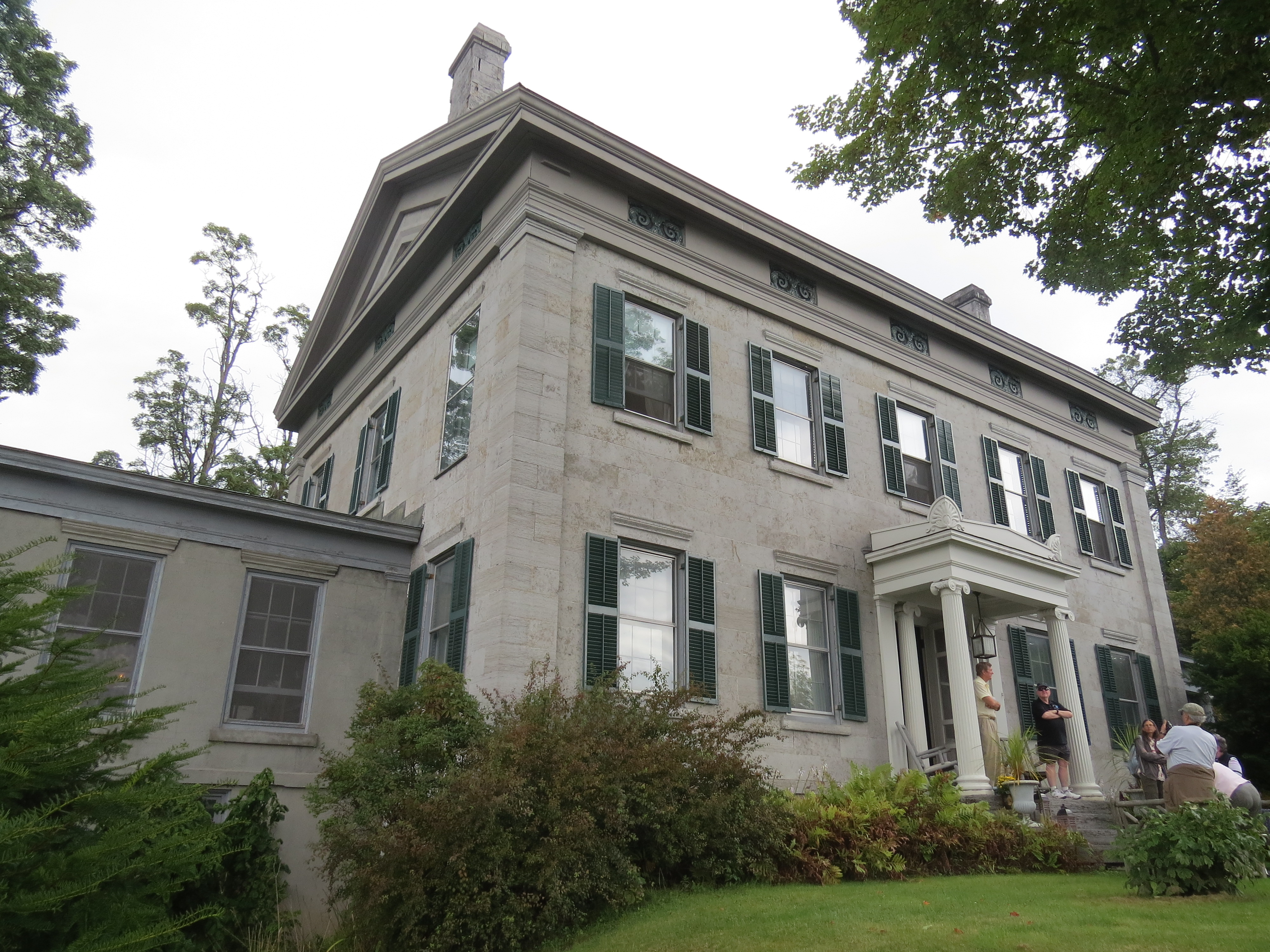
Greystone

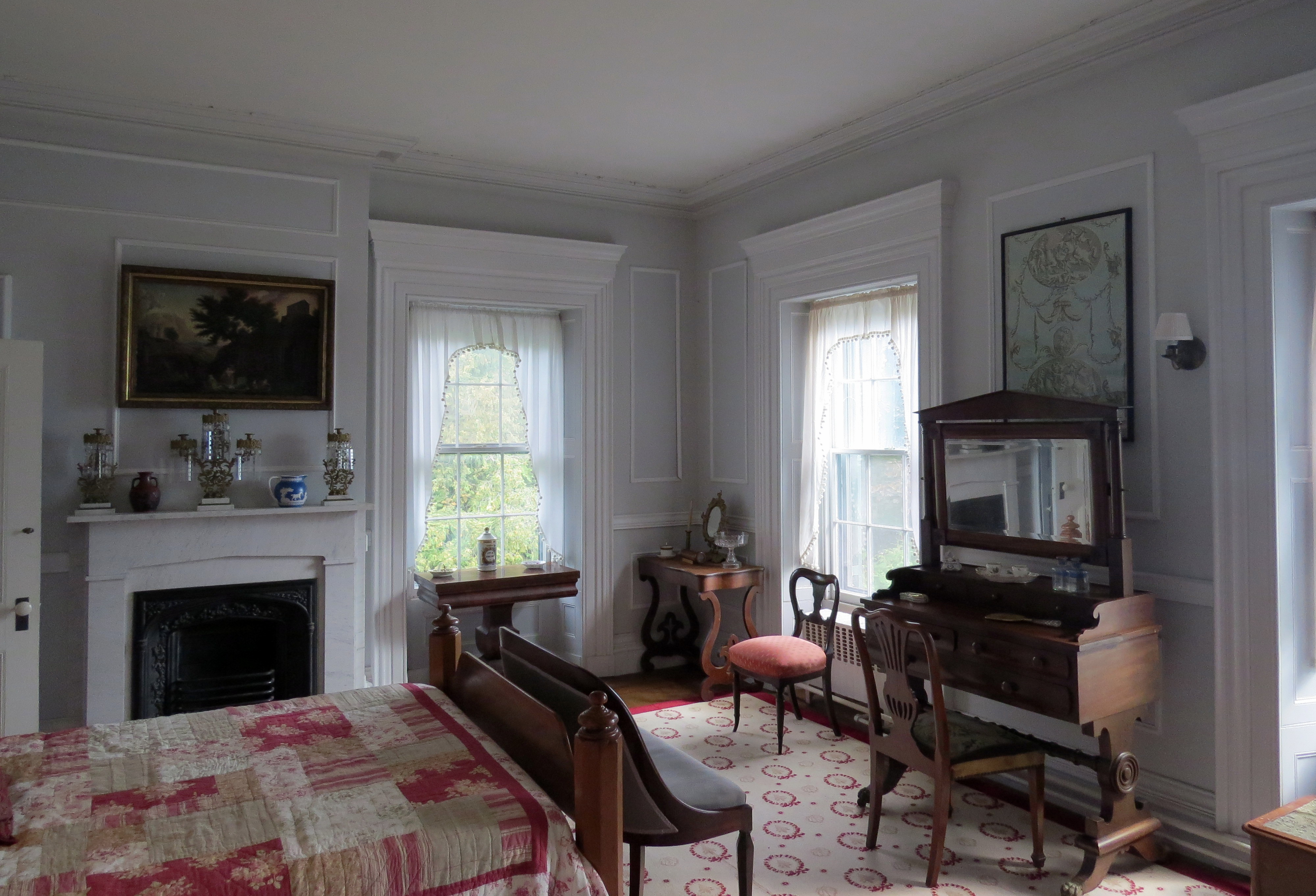
A bedroom in Greystone

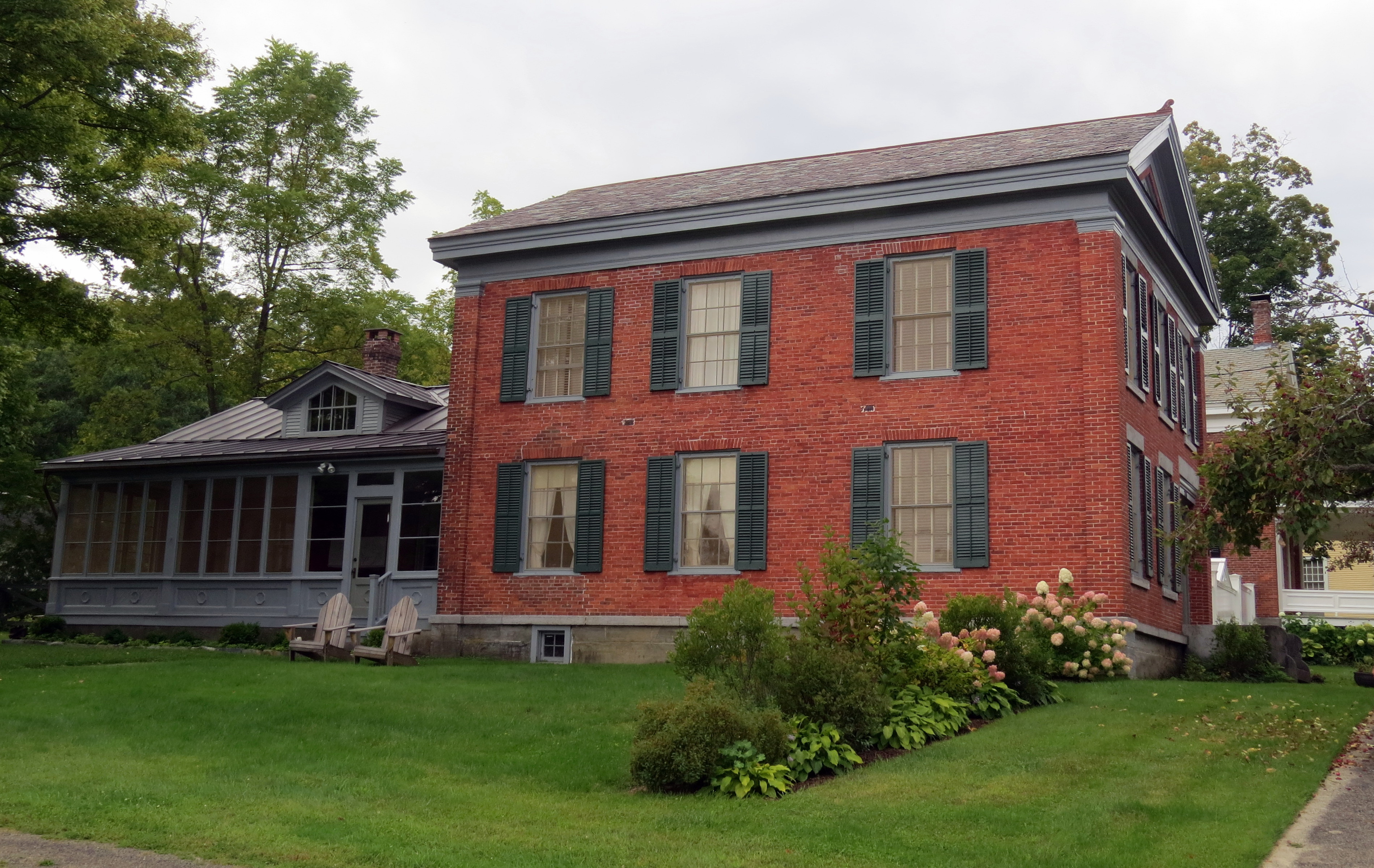
Cyrus Stafford House

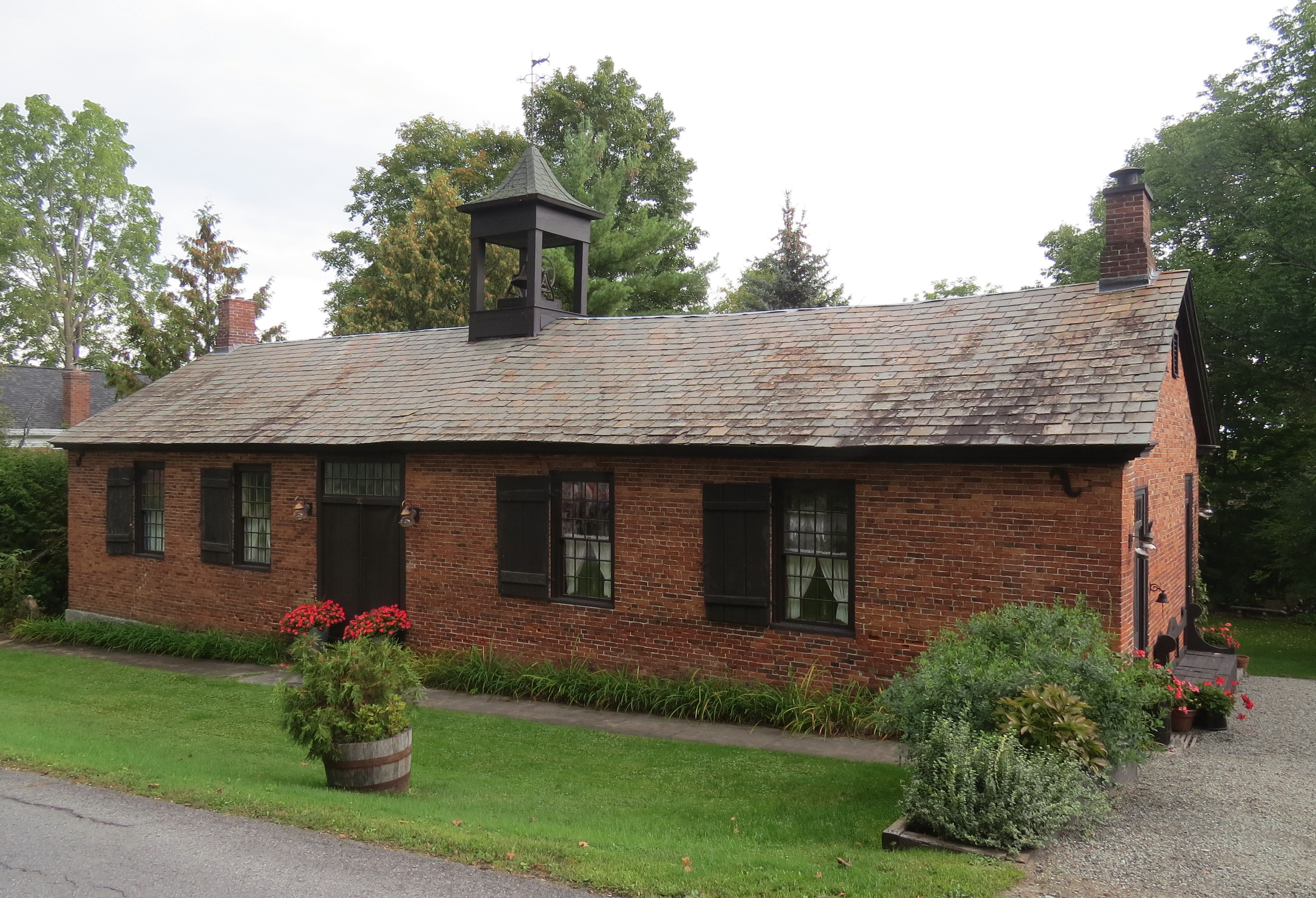
Old Brick Schoolhouse

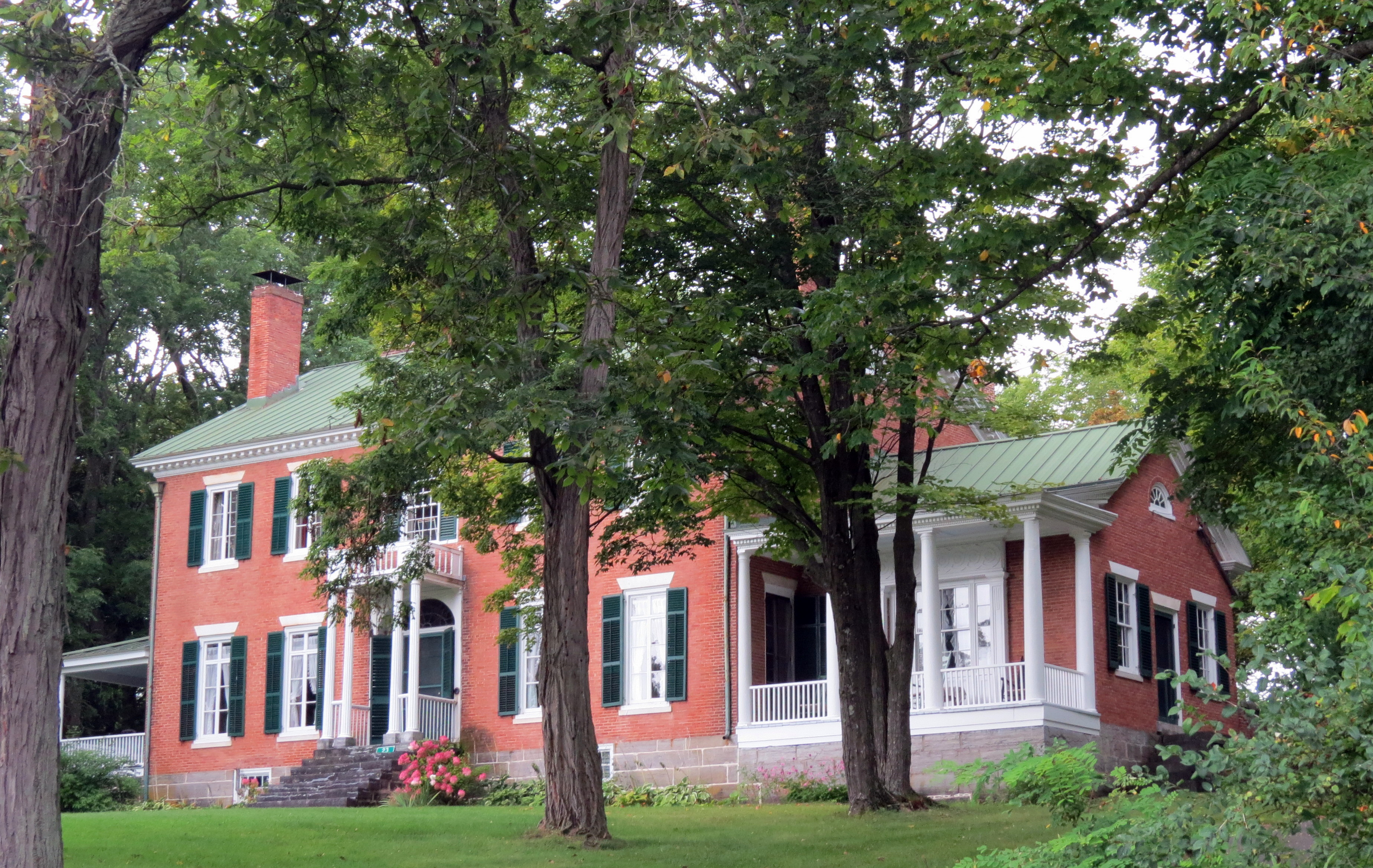
Hickory Hill

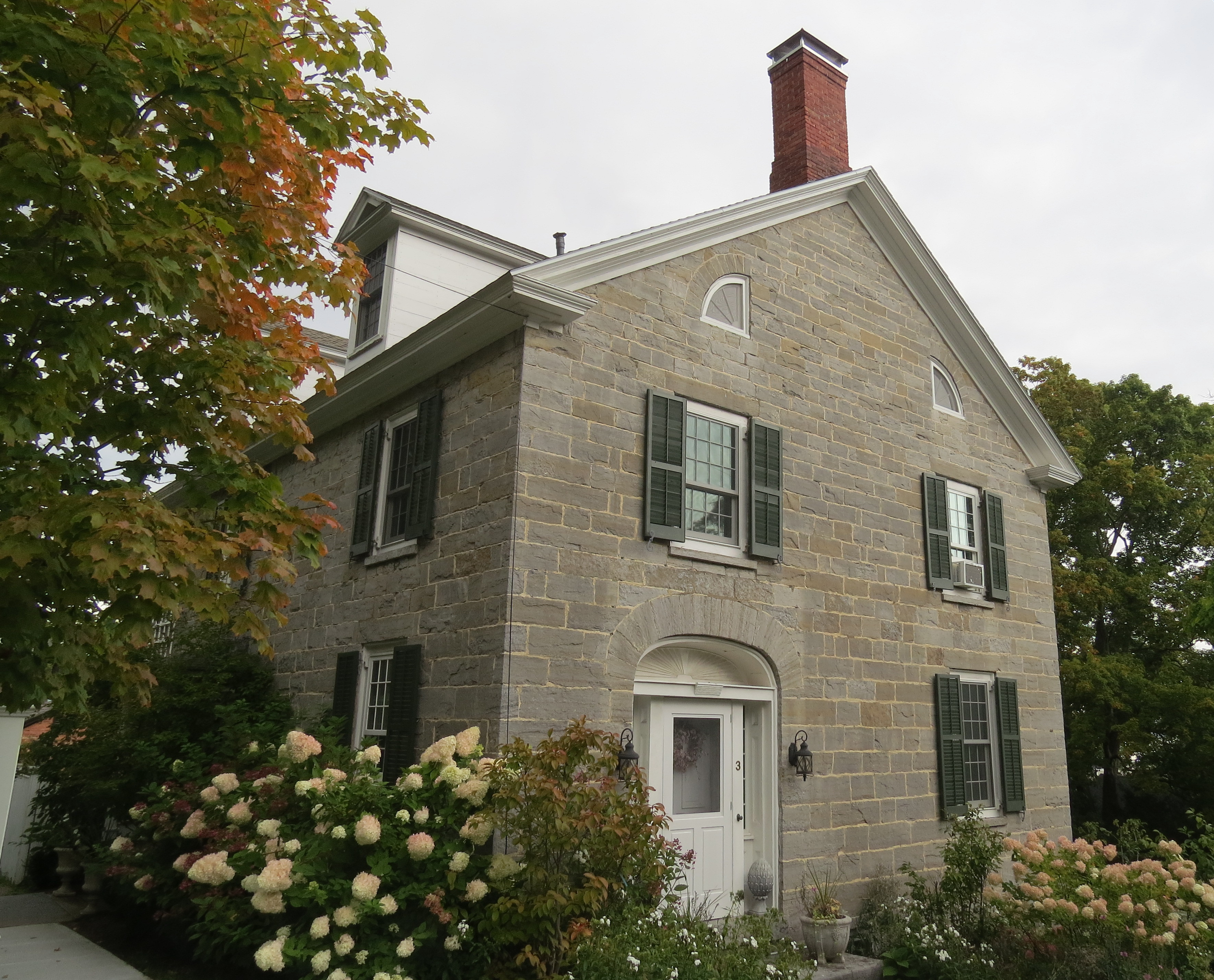
Dr. Samuel Shumway House

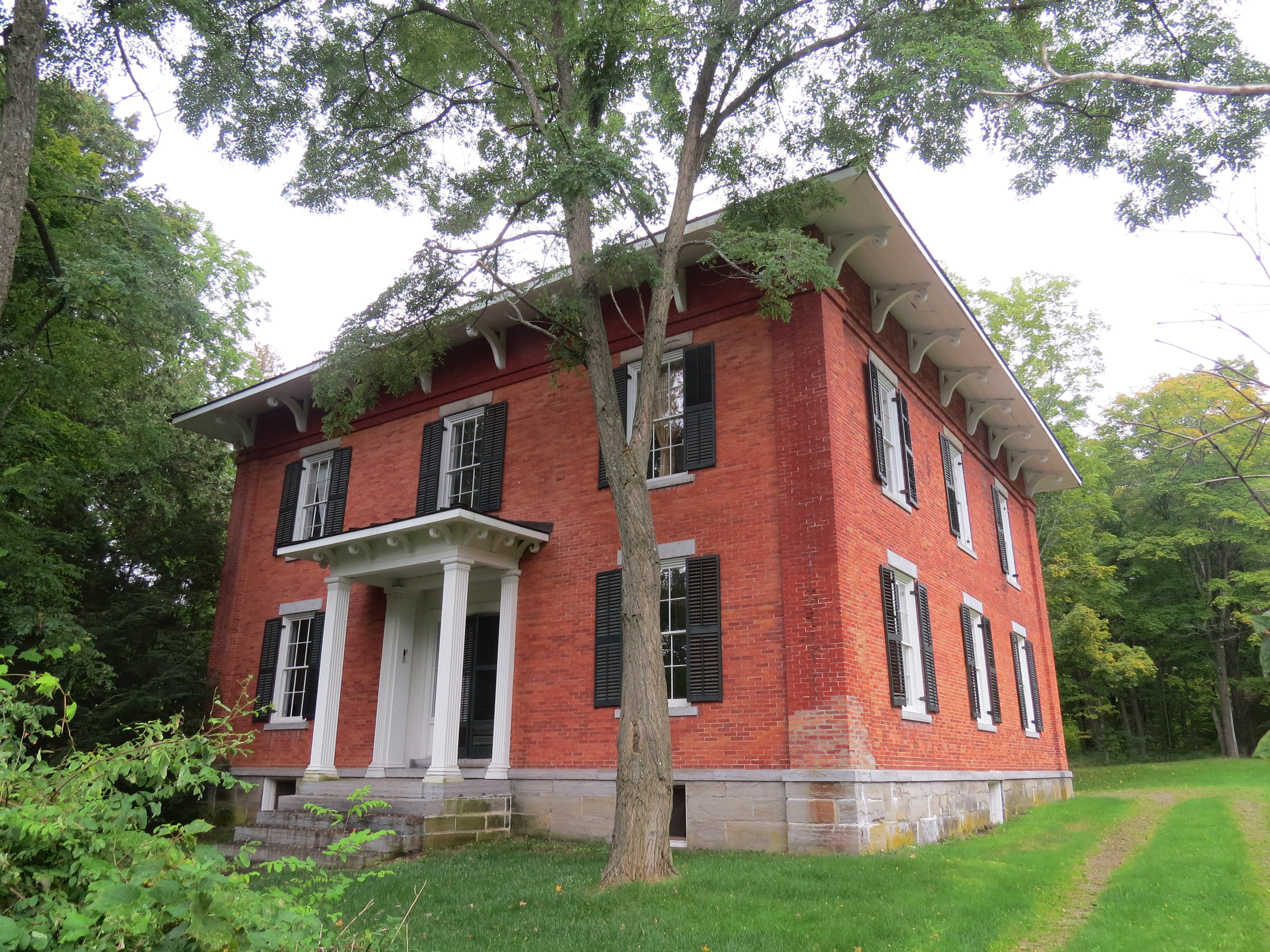
Noble Clemons House

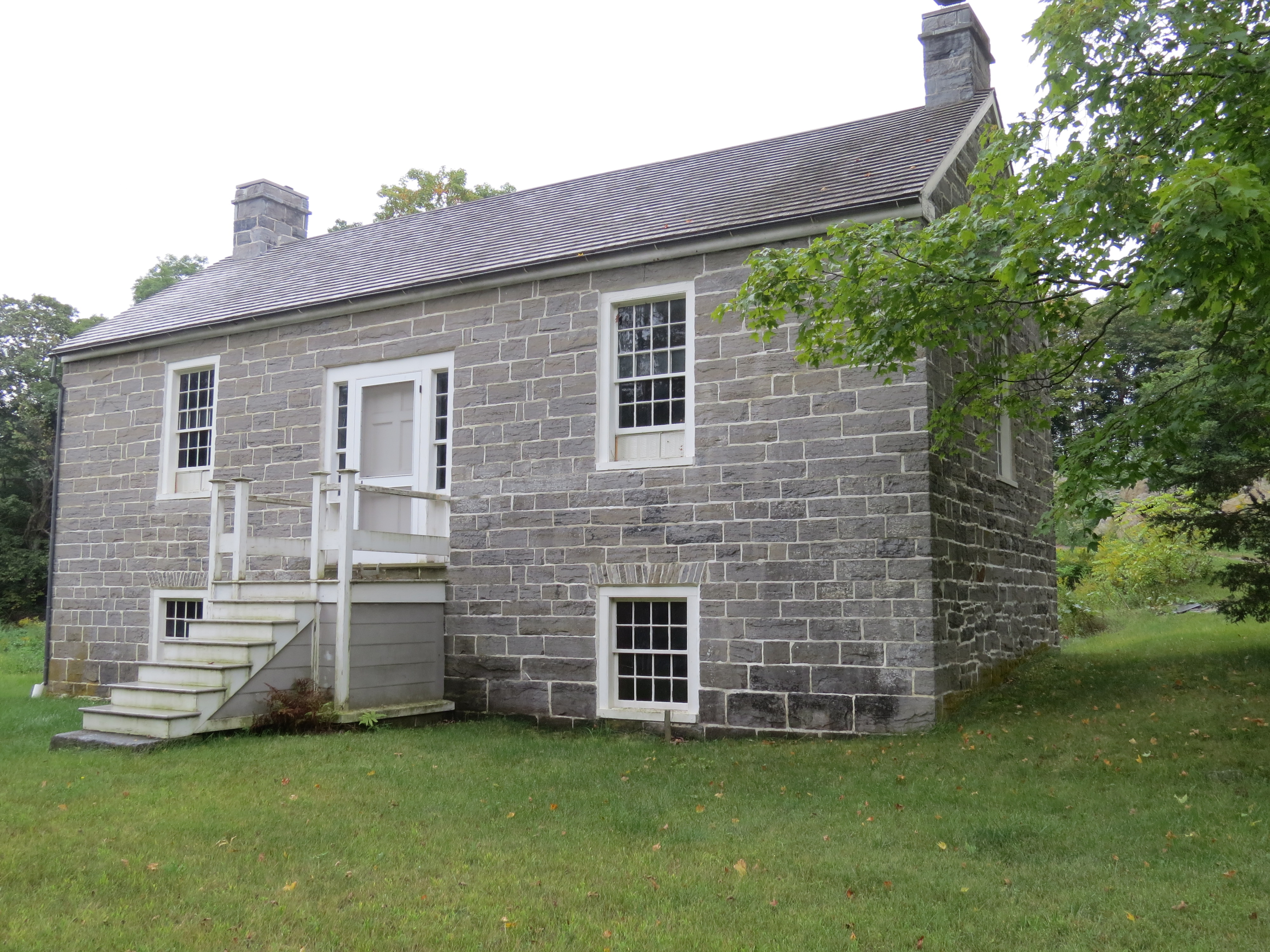
Billings Stone Cottage

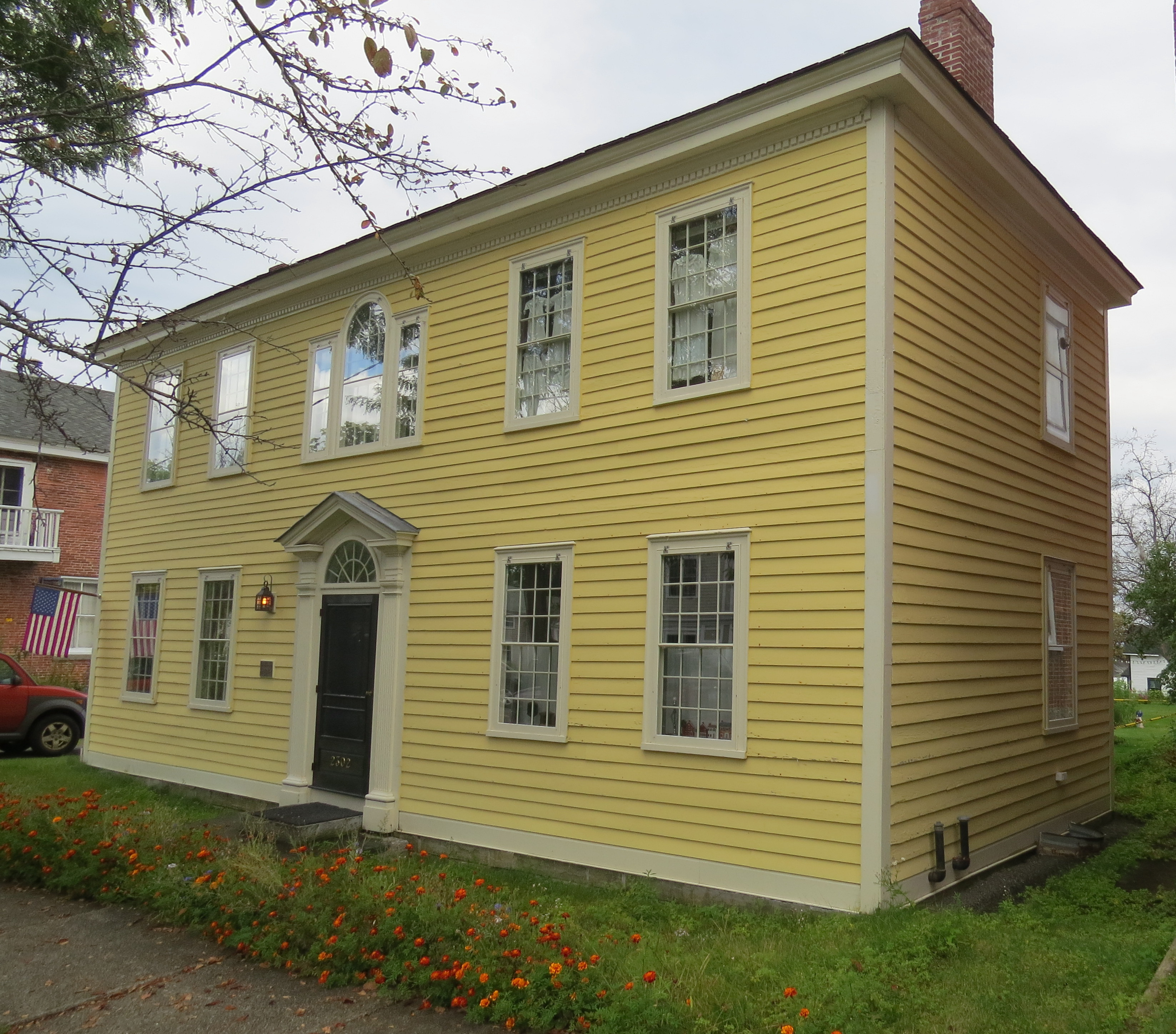
Ralph Haskell House

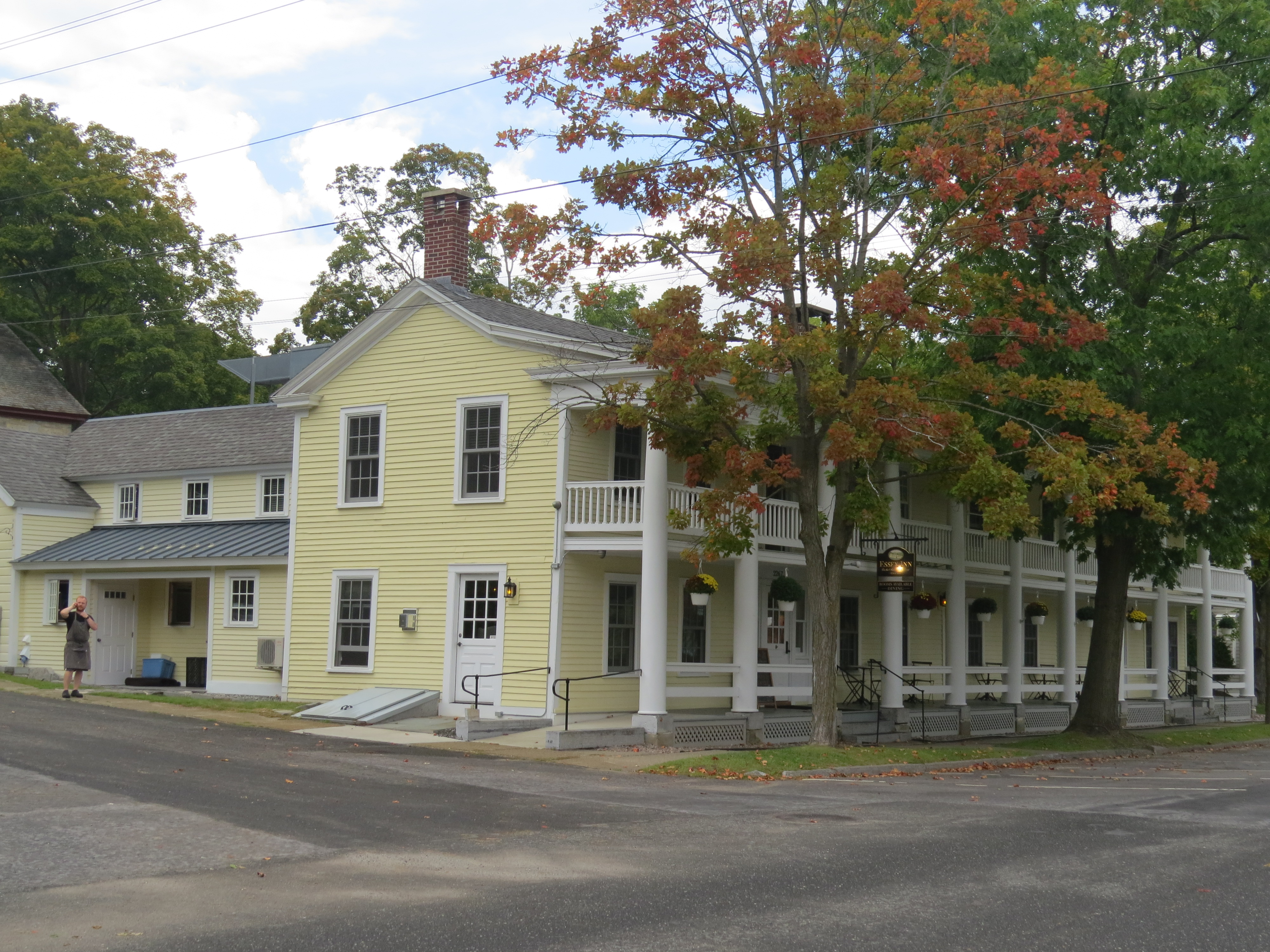
Essex Inn

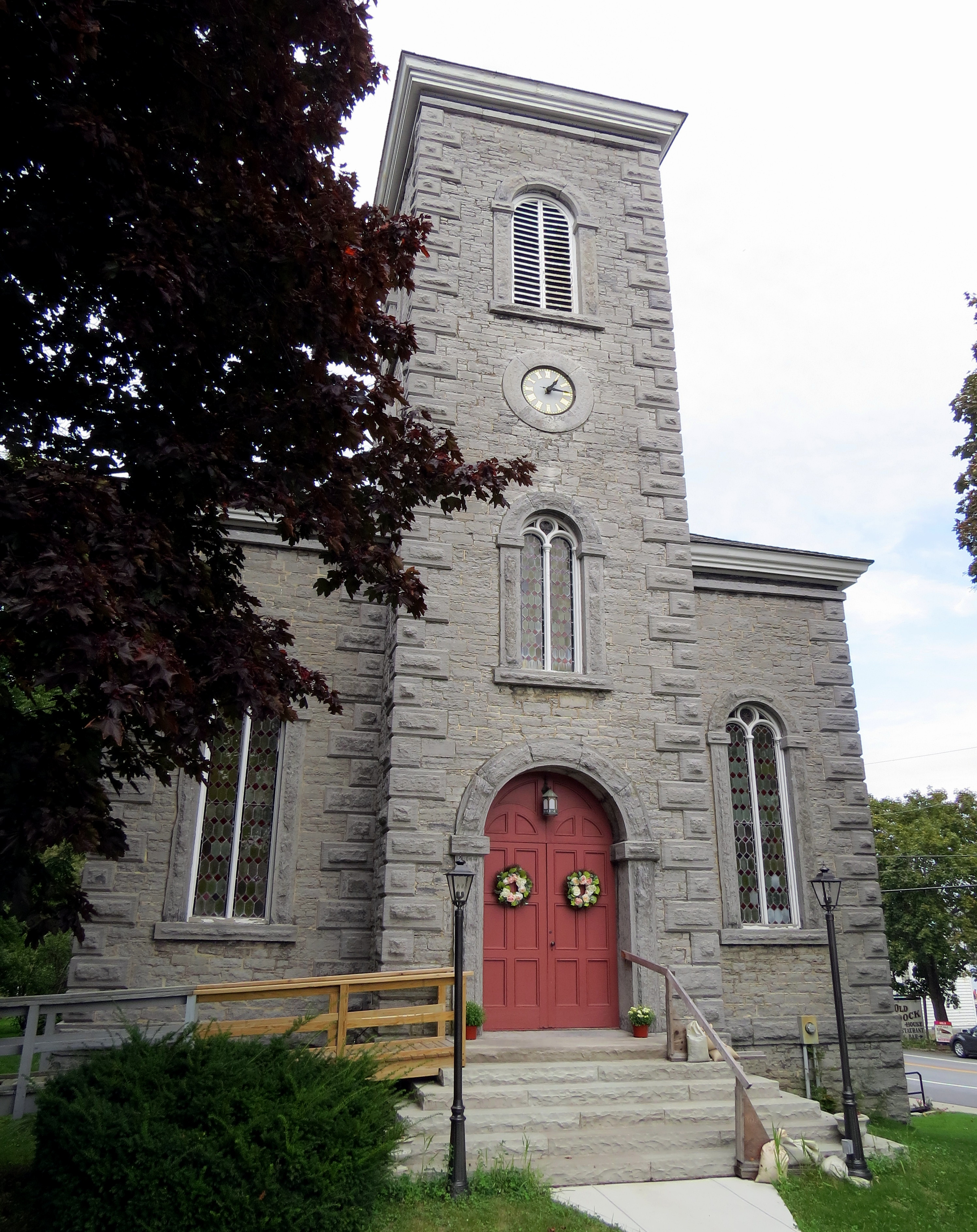
Essex Community Church
