= Essex County Home and Farm =

- U.S. National Register of Historic Places
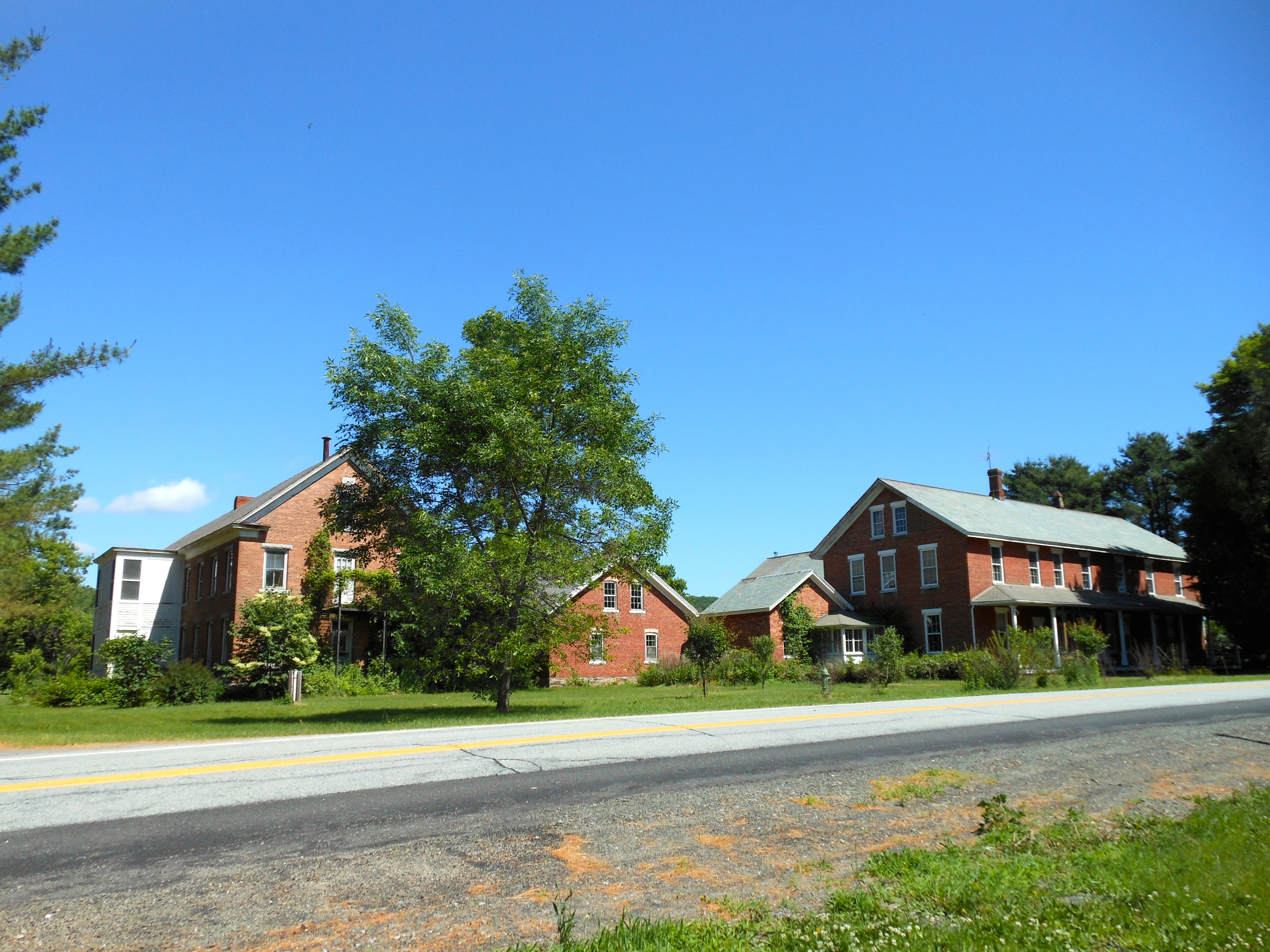

- Location within New York Location within the United States
- Nearest city: Whallonsburg, New York
- Coordinates: 44°15′23″N 73°24′38″W
- Area: 24 acres (9.7 ha)
- Built: 1860
- Architect: Dowling & Prescott
- NRHP reference No.: 82003357
- Added to NRHP: September 23, 1982

Essex County Home and Farm, also known as Whallonsburg County Home and Infirmary, is a historic almshouse and infirmary located at Whallonsburg in Essex County, New York. The property include seven contributing buildings and one contributing site. The core of the complex is a homogeneous cluster of four brick buildings on fieldstone foundations. The largest is the Home Building, a 2-story dormitory originally constructed in 1860. Located nearby are a milk house and dining / kitchen building. The 2 1/2-story infirmary building was built in 1899. Farm buildings include an equipment shed / garage, dairy barn, and hog-chicken house. Also on the property is the institution's cemetery site. The home and infirmary ceased operation in 1980.

It was listed on the National Register of Historic Places in 1982.
