= No Place to Be Somebody =

- Original language: English
- Written by: Charles Gordone
- Characters: Gabe Gabriel; Shanty Mulligan; Johnny Williams; Dee Jacobson; Evie Ames; Cora Beasely; Melvin Smeltz; Mary Lou Bolton; Ellen; Sweets Crane; Mike Maffucci; Louie; Judge Bolton; Machine Dog; Sergeant Cappaletti; Harry
- Genre: Drama

Premiere
- Date: May 2, 1969
- Place: New York Shakespeare Festival Public Theater; New York City, New York, United States
- Directed by: Edward Cornell

No Place to Be Somebody is a 1969 play written by American playwright Charles Gordone.

It was during his employment as a bartender in Greenwich Village that Gordone found the inspiration for his first major work, No Place to Be Somebody, for which he received the 1970 Pulitzer Prize for Drama. Gordone's Pulitzer signified two "firsts": he was the first African American playwright to receive a Pulitzer, and No Place to Be Somebody was the first off-Broadway play to receive the award.

Written over the course of seven years, the play explores racial tensions in a Civil Rights-era story about a black bartender who tries to outsmart a white mobster syndicate. In his final speech, in June 1995, delivered at the Museum of the American West in Los Angeles, Gordone described the play as being "about country folk who had migrated to the big city, seeking the urban myth of success, only to find disappointment, despair, and death." After an experimental production directed by Gordone, in November 1967, the play was produced in a showcase of three weekends at The Other Stage in Joe Papp's Public Theater in South Manhattan by director Edward Cornell. The play was then launched on May 4, 1969 by Joseph Papp on a 248-performance run at the New York Shakespeare Festival's Public Theater, followed by an acclaimed limited engagement at Broadway's ANTA Theatre. The play's run (at New York's ANTA Playhouse) lasted 15 performances, followed by three national touring companies from 1970 to 1977, all of which Gordone directed.

The play was revived in 1987 at The Matrix Theatre Company in Los Angeles, California in an adaptation directed by Bill Duke and starring one of the original cast from the play's initial 1969 run, Ron Thompson, in the role of Shanty Mulligan.
