= Charles Gordone =

American dramatist and playwright (1925–1995)

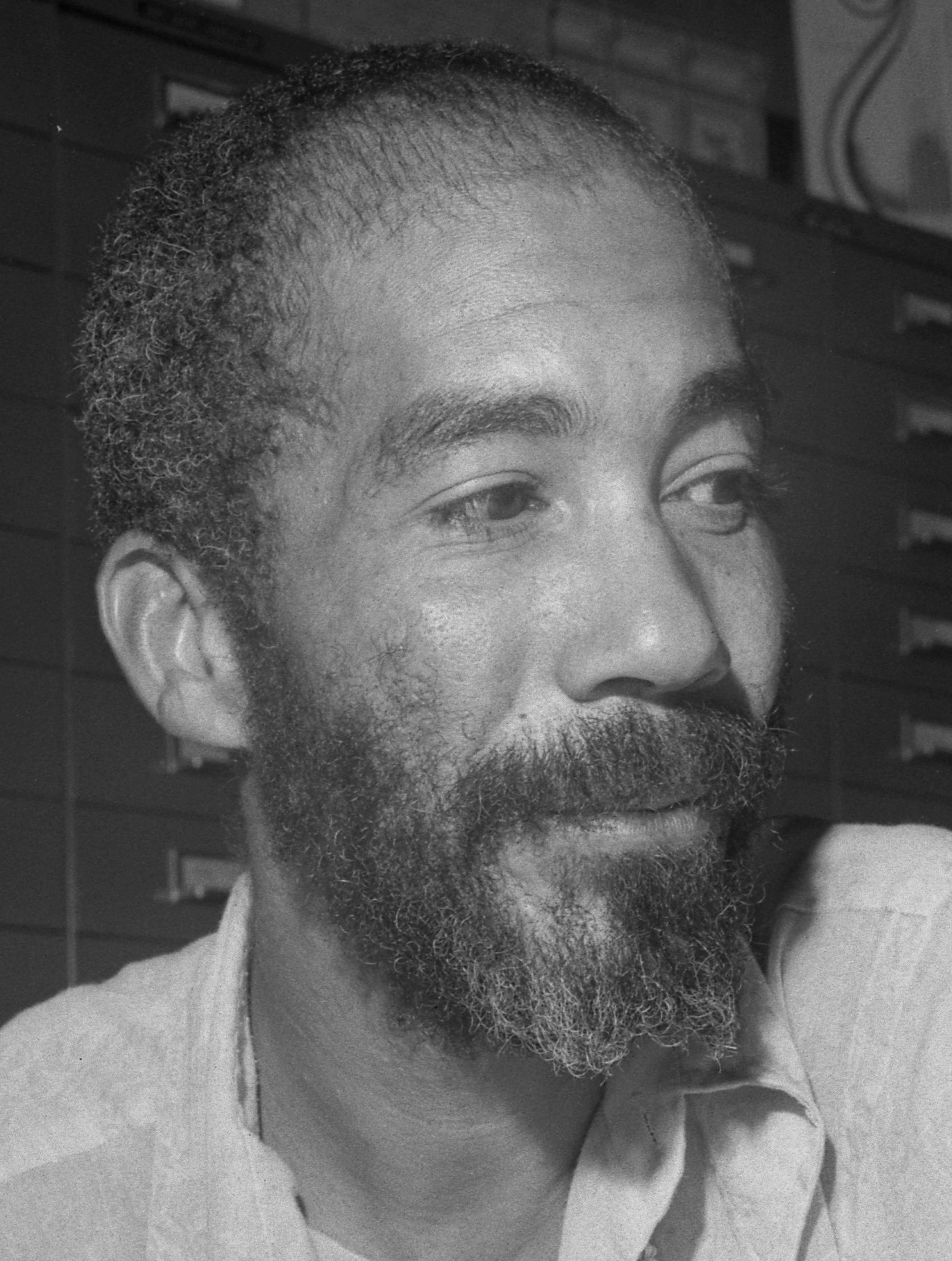
- Gordone in 1970
- Born: Charles Edward Fleming; October 12, 1925; Cleveland, Ohio, U.S.
- Died: November 16, 1995 (aged 70); College Station, Texas, U.S.
- Education: Los Angeles City College; University of California, Los Angeles; California State University, Los Angeles (BA); Columbia University; New York University
- Occupations: Actor, director, playwright, producer, educator
- Spouses: Juanita Barton (m. 1948, divorced) Jeanne Warner (before 1960)
- Writing career
- Notable awards: Pulitzer Prize for Drama (1970)

Charles Edward Gordone (October 12, 1925 – November 16, 1995) was an American playwright, actor, director, and educator. He was the first African American to win the annual Pulitzer Prize for Drama and he devoted much of his professional life to the pursuit of multi-racial American theater and racial unity.

== Biography ==
=== Early years ===
Charles Edward Fleming was born in Cleveland, Ohio to Charles and Camille Fleming (née Morgan), of African, Native American, and European heritage. He grew up in Elkhart, Indiana, with two brothers, Jack and Stanley, and a sister, Shirley. He attended Elkhart High School. Camille Fleming later remarried William L. Gordon and the couple had a daughter, Leah Geraldine.

In his 20s, Gordone served in the Air Force, and was discharged at the rank of second lieutenant. After his career in the Air Force, Gordone moved to California, where he married his first wife Juanita Barton in 1948. Together they had two children, Stephen Gordone and Judy Ann Riser. The couple later parted ways and Barton ensconced himself in theater at Los Angeles City College and California State University, Los Angeles. He then moved to New York City, where he waited tables and pursued an acting career.

In the late 1950s, Charles met his second wife, Jeanne Warner, in Greenwich Village, New York City. In the 1960s, they had one daughter together, Leah-Carla Gordone. During the 1960s revolution, "open marriages" were common, and Charles met artist Nancy Meadows. Together they had a son, David Brent Gordone, yet Charles Gordone remained with Jeanne Warner raising their daughter Leah-Carla in New York City over the years while Nancy Meadows left her position with the Washington Post and traveled around with her son David as a member of Wavy Gravy's Hog Farm (a 1960s hippie communal/caravan group that coordinated light shows for major concerts around the U.S., including the first Woodstock Concert).

=== Career ===
Throughout the 1950s and 1960s, Gordone continued acting and began directing. At one point, he sang and played guitar in a calypso band. He co-founded both the Committee for the Employment of Negro Performers and the Vantage Theater in Queens. His acting credits included Brother Jerro in The Trials of Brother Jerro Bohem, Hickey in Of Mice and Men, and The Valet in Jean Genet's The Blacks (1961–66) alongside James Earl Jones, Maya Angelou, Cicely Tyson, and many other Black actors who went on to change Hollywood. In the 70's, Gordone's distinctive voice guided him to four film collaborations with controversial animation director Ralph Bakshi; as Crazy Moe in Heavy Traffic, Preacher Fox in Coonskin, along with two uncredited vocal performances in Wizards and Hey, Good Lookin'. In 1987, Gordone appeared in the movie Angel Heart, starring Mickey Rourke, Lisa Bonet and Robert De Niro. He also assisted with the casting of the '60s feature film Nothing But a Man, starring Ivan Dixon, Abbey Lincoln, and Julius Harris.

Mr. Gordone's first play, A Little More Light Around the Place, was co-written with Sidney Easton in 1964. It was an adaptation of Mr. Easton's book of the same title.

It was during his employment as a waiter in a Greenwich Village bar that Gordone found inspiration for his first major work as a playwright, No Place to Be Somebody (Alexander Street Press), for which he won the 1970 Pulitzer Prize for Drama. Written over the course of seven years, the play underwent one major change in the course of its production: the omitting (by Gordone himself) of an imaginary character named Machine Dog. This character can still be found in the actual play versions (i.e. the rare, out-of-print Bobbs-Merrill and Samuel French editions, as well as the currently available Alexander Street Press version). Not only was Charles the first playwright of African-American descent to receive the Pulitzer, but No Place to Be Somebody was the first Off-Broadway play (Joseph Papp's The Public Theater) to receive the award.

No Place is the story of Black bar owner (Johnny Romero) trying to carve out his piece of the American Dream in a New York City neighborhood where most venues are run by the Mafia. Johnny's best friend (Gabe Gabriel) is a light-skinned black actor/writer who is too white-looking to land black roles and too ethnic-looking to get any white roles, and this causes him great angst. Romero is brimming with arrogance, and a "get-over" mentality, while Gabriel appears intent on holding high morals, and the two of them are always at odds. It was often said that both Johnny and Gabe represent Gordone's alter egos.

Described as a "Black-black comedy", No Place to Be Somebody soon hit Broadway running, under the production of Gordone's wife Jeanne Warner-Gordone and partner Ashton Springer (Broadway producer of Bubbling Brown Sugar). Subsequently, with Gordone as director, No Place played to packed houses with diverse audiences. From 1970 to 1977, the play toured nationally, with Gordone as author/director for all three separate companies. Jeanne coordinated, booked, and managed the touring companies, as little Leah-Carla traveled with her often-on-the-road mother. A theatrical legacy was being forged.

=== Personal life ===
In 1981, Gordone moved back to California, where he met his last wife and leading lady Susan Kouyomjian in Berkeley. Gordone worked with Kouyomjian for three years at her theater, American Stage. There, he directed classics such as August Strindberg's Miss Julie and Tennessee Williams' A Streetcar Named Desire.

In 1984, Gordone returned to New York City to resume work on his stage Western Roan Brown & Cherry. Soon after, Kouyomjian joined him in Harlem, where they resided together.

After relocating to Taos, New Mexico, in 1987 for a fellowship at the D. H. Lawrence Ranch, residing in the cabin once occupied by D. H. Lawrence, Gordone went on to teach Theater History and Theater at Texas A&M University. Over a period of eight years, through his teaching and directing many of the university's stage play productions, he advanced racial diversity in the arts at the College Station, Texas campus, which had been segregated for 100 years, up until 1963. During his residency as a professor of Theater Arts, Charles Gordone joined the multi-racial Western Revival, involving poets, dancers, artists and singers, and invited them into A&M classrooms as part of his "American Voices" program.

Gordone was awarded membership in the Actors Studio.

On November 16, 1995, Gordone died of liver cancer. The cowboy poets and musicians of the Texas Panhandle honored him with a prairie funeral at sunset and scattered his ashes across the legendary XIT Ranch. In New York City, simultaneously, fellow actors, playwrights, and directors gathered to hold a vigil memorial for him at The Public Theater. Charles's daughter, critically acclaimed singer/songwriter/musician (Butterfly Child, Dancing on the Dragon, and Phoenix From The Ashes: Rise CDs) and author (The Motorgirl Memoirs on Amazon.com) Leah-Carla Gordone, spoke, sang, and played her guitar at the event, where Charles's wife, Jeanne, was present, along with many former cast members of No Place to Be Somebody.

In 1996, the National Endowment for the Arts profiled, at length, Gordone's work for integration at Texas A&M University, for "strengthening the diverse bonds of our cultural heritage." On March 2, 2009, Jeanne Warner-Gordone died at the age of 70, leaving in her wake a book entitled To and From the Pulitzer: Charles Gordone's Quest for an American Theater, which details her No Place days, primarily containing numerous in-depth recollections by Gordone's closest colleagues, friends and family members.

== Legacy ==
The Texas A&M Creative Writing Program has established The Charles Gordone Awards to commemorate Gordone by offering cash prizes each spring in poetry and in prose to an undergraduate and graduate student. Efforts continue to establish a permanent memorial on the Texas A&M University campus. In 2011, "Legacy of a Seer," an exhibition of portraits of Gordone painted by Robert Schiffhauer was on display at the Wright Gallery at the Texas A&M College of Architecture.

== Awards ==
- 1969 Drama Desk Award for Most Promising Playwright – No Place to Be Somebody
- 1970 Pulitzer Prize for Drama – No Place to Be Somebody
- 1970 Los Angeles Drama Critics Circle Award
- 1971 American Academy of Arts and Letters Award

== Bibliography ==
- 1964 A Little More Light Around the Place
- 1967 No Place to Be Somebody: A Black-Black Comedy
- 1969 Worl's Champeen Lip Dansuh an' Watah Mellon Jooglah
- 1970 Chumpanzee
- 1970 Willy Bignigga
- 1970 Gordone Is a Muthah
- 1975 Baba-Chops
- 1976 Under the Boardwalk
- 1977 The Last Chord
- 1978 A Qualification for Anabiosis
- 1983 The Block
- 1983 Anabiosis
