= Edward Cornell =

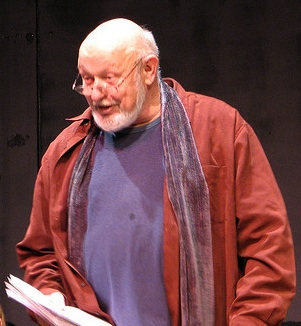
- Born: April 2, 1944; Hartford, Connecticut
- Died: March 30, 2025 (aged 80); Ticonderoga, New York
- Education: Williams College (BA); Yale School of Drama
- Occupations: artist, theater director, painter
- Website: crookedbrookstudios.com

Edward Cornell (1944–2025) was an early associate of Joseph Papp at the New York Shakespeare Festival. He was the first managing director of the Festival's experimental wing, The Other Stage, where he directed No Place to Be Somebody, the Festival's first Pulitzer Prize winner.

== Life ==
He lived his early life in the Boston area. His father was a rocket engineer at the MIT's Charles Stark Draper Laboratory. At Williams College, he studied acting and directing under Keith Fowler, and after graduating he attended Yale Drama School where he met Joseph Papp and came to New York as his assistant at The Public Theater. He later resided in the Adirondack Park where he established a career as a painter and sculptor.

== Bibliography ==
- William Shakespeare's Naked Hamlet, Joseph Papp assisted by Ted Cornell; The McMillan Co., 1969.
- Free for All: Joe Papp, The Public, and the Greatest Theater Story Every Told, by Kenneth Turan & Joseph Papp, 2009.

== See also ==
- Joseph Papp
- New York Shakespeare Festival
- No Place to Be Somebody
