= Edward II (play) =

Renaissance play by Christopher Marlowe

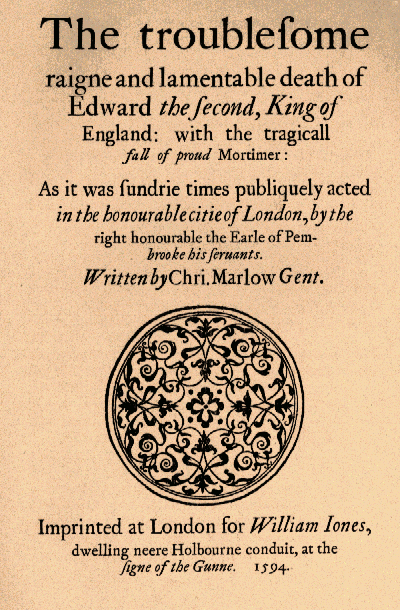
Title page of the earliest published text of Edward II (1594)

The Troublesome Reign and Lamentable Death of Edward the Second, King of England, with the Tragical Fall of Proud Mortimer, known as Edward II, is a Renaissance or early modern period play written by the English playwright Christopher Marlowe. It is one of the earliest English history plays, and focuses on the relationship between King Edward II of England and Piers Gaveston, and Edward's murder on the orders of Roger Mortimer.

Marlowe found most of his material for this play in the third volume of Raphael Holinshed's Chronicles (1587). Frederick S. Boas believes that "out of all the rich material provided by Holinshed" Marlowe was drawn to "the comparatively unattractive reign of Edward II" due to the relationship between the King and Gaveston. Boas elaborates, "Homosexual affection ... has (as has been seen) a special attraction for Marlowe. Jove and Ganymede in Dido, Henry III and his 'minions' in The Massacre, Neptune and Leander in Hero and Leander, and all akin, although drawn to a slighter scale, to Edward and Gaveston." Boas also notes the existence of a number of parallels between Edward II and The Massacre at Paris, asserting that "it is scarcely too much to say that scenes xi–xxi of The Massacre are something in the nature of a preliminary sketch for Edward II." Marlowe stayed close to the account but embellished it with the character of Lightborn (or Lucifer) as Edward's assassin.

== Publication ==
The play was entered into the Stationers' Register on 6 July 1593, five weeks after Marlowe's death. The earliest extant edition was published in octavo in 1594, printed by Robert Robinson for the bookseller William Jones. The 1594 edition, customarily referred to as Q1, "is a quarto in size, shape and signature format . . . gathered and signed in fours." A second edition, issued in 1598, was printed by Richard Braddock for Jones. Subsequent editions were published in 1612, by Richard Barnes, and in 1622, by Henry Bell.

The 1594 first edition of the play is very rare and was uncovered only in 1876. Only one copy, held at the Zentralbibliothek Zürich, was known to exist after a second was lost in the Second World War. In 2012, a third copy was discovered in Germany by Jeffrey Masten. The volume was bound by its original German owner, who visited England in 1594, with a treatise arguing against the execution of heretics and another on Turkey and Islam.

== Authorship ==
Each of the first four quartos of the play lists Marlowe as the playwright, and his authorship has never been in doubt. Robert Dodsley included it in his Select Collection of Old Plays in 1744, but Marlowe's name was not even mentioned in the preface. Marlowe's reputation was still damaged by Thomas Beard's libel in The Theatre of God's Judgement, published in 1597.

== Characters ==
- Edward II
- Prince Edward
- Kent, (half-)brother to King Edward the Second
- Gaveston
- Archbishop of Canterbury
- Bishop of Coventry
- Bishop of Winchester
- Warwick
- Lancaster
- Pembroke
- Arundel
- Leicester
- Berkeley
- Mortimer the Elder
- Mortimer the Younger, his nephew
- Spenser the Elder
- Spenser the Younger
- Baldock
- Baumont
- Trussel
- (Thomas) Gurney
- Matrevis
- Lightborn
- Sir John of Hainault
- Levune
- Rice ap Howel
- Abbot of Neath
- James
- Horse Boy
- The Herald
- The Champion
- Post
- Mayor of Bristow
- Monks
- Lords, Poor Men, James, Mower, Champion, Messengers, Soldiers, and Attendants
- Queen Isabella, wife to King Edward the Second
- Lady Margaret de Clare, Niece to King Edward
- Ladies

== Synopsis ==
The play telescopes most of Edward II's reign into a single narrative, beginning with the recall of his favourite, Piers Gaveston, from exile, and ending with his son, Edward III, executing Mortimer Junior for the king's murder.

Marlowe's play opens at the outset of the reign, with Edward's exiled favourite, Piers Gaveston, rejoicing at the recent death of Edward I and his own resulting ability to return to England. He plans entertainments with which he will delight the king.

Upon Gaveston's re-entry into the country, Edward gives him titles, access to the royal treasury, and the option of having guards protect him. Although Gaveston himself is not of noble birth, he maintains that he is better than common people and craves pleasing shows, Italian masques, music and poetry. However, as much as Gaveston pleases the king he finds scant favour from the king's nobles, who are soon clamouring for Gaveston's exile. Almost as soon as he arrives, Gaveston and Edward's court begin to quarrel. Edward is forced to agree to this and banishes Gaveston to Ireland. Isabella of France, the Queen, who still hopes for his favour, persuades Mortimer, who later becomes her lover, to argue for his recall, though only so that he may be more conveniently murdered. The nobles accordingly soon find an excuse to turn on Gaveston again, and eventually capture and execute him. Before executing Gaveston, Edward requests to see Gaveston one more time. Arundel and Pembroke agree to Edward's request. However, Warwick attacks and kills Gaveston while he is being taken to Edward. Edward in turn executes two of the nobles who persecuted Gaveston, Warwick and Lancaster.

Edward then seeks comfort in new favourites, Spencer and his father. This alienates Isabella, who takes Mortimer as her lover and travels to France with her son in search of allies. France, however, will not help the queen and refuses to give her arms, although she does get help from Sir John of Hainault. Edward, both in the play and in history, is nothing like the soldier his father was—it was during his reign that the English army was disastrously defeated at Bannockburn—and is soon outgeneralled. Edward takes refuge in Neath Abbey, but is betrayed by a mower, who emblematically carries a scythe. Both Spencers are executed, and the king himself is taken to Kenilworth. His brother Edmund, Earl of Kent, after having initially renounced his cause, now tries to help him but realizes too late the power the young Mortimer now has. Arrested for approaching the imprisoned Edward, Edmund is taken to court, where Mortimer, Isabella and Edward III preside. He is executed by Mortimer, who claims he is a threat to the throne, despite the pleading of Edward III.

The prisoner king is then taken to Berkeley Castle, where he meets the luxuriously cruel Lightborn, whose name is an anglicised version of "Lucifer". Despite knowing that Lightborn is there to kill him, Edward asks him to stay by his side. Lightborn, realizing that the king will not fall for delay, has him restrained by four men, and murders him by burning out his bowels from the inside with a red hot poker (so as not to leave external marks of violence). Maltravers and Gurney witness this, before Gurney kills Lightborn to keep his silence. Later, however, Gurney flees, and Mortimer sends Maltravers after him, as they fear betrayal. Isabella arrives to warn Mortimer that Edward III, her son with Edward II, has discovered their plot. Before they can plan accordingly, her son arrives with attendants and other lords, accusing Mortimer of murder. Mortimer denies this, but eventually is arrested and taken away. He tells Isabella not to weep for him, and the queen begs her son to show Mortimer mercy, but he refuses. Edward III then orders Mortimer's death and his mother's imprisonment, and the play ends with him taking the throne.

== Themes ==
=== Homoeroticism ===
Edward and Gaveston's homoerotic relationship provides the backdrop for the play. When Gaveston plans to produce his masque, he describes "a lovely boy in Dian's shape... / And in his sportful hands an olive tree / To hide those parts which men delight to see" (1.2.60–63). Gaveston is deeply aware of the theatre's ability to eroticize young male actors. The Queen feels jealous of Gaveston and Edward's relationship, noting: "For now my lord the king regards me not, / But dotes upon the love of Gaveston. / He claps his cheeks and hangs about his neck, / Smiles in his face and whispers in his ears" (1.2.49–52).

Much of the criticism on Edward II focuses on homoeroticism and power. For example, Emily Bartels's Spectacles of Strangeness—which focuses on how Marlowe depicts "others" and how that depiction exposes "demonization of the other as a strategy for self-authorization and self-empowerment"—has a chapter on Edward II entitled "The Show of Sodomy". In this chapter, Bartels focuses on how sodomy is politicized, exposed and defined, stating, "In Marlowe, sodomy is finally neither unseeable nor unspeakable. Rather it is exposed as a subject obscured and displayed as beyond display by those who would maintain a hegemonic hold over 'what the matter meant.'" In order to show how sodomy works in Marlowe's plays, Bartels places particular attention to the tension between how sodomy is hidden in the play and then sanctioned as the means of killing Edward. Bartels pays close attention to the fact that Lightborn's murder of the king leaves no marks on his body. She concludes that "sodomical leanings...are not politically corrupt. Though largely unspoken, they are not unspeakable."

Sodomy was not a clearly defined act in the early modern period. Jonathan Goldberg asserts that sodomy was "invisible so long as homosexual acts failed to connect with the much more visible signs of social disruption represented by unorthodox religious or social positions". David Stymeist reconciles two opposing critical approaches to Edward II—one that views the play as subversive towards sexual norms and one that upholds sexual norms—by paying attention to how the play presents alternative sexuality and how it punishes sexual transgressions.

The spatial difference between Ireland and England is the significance of how much Edward's state wanted Gaveston gone, but at the same time, if Gaveston travels such distance to see the King, it puts a big spotlight on their desire to see one another and their intimacy.

==== Queer brotherhood ====
Queer brotherhood specifically refers to the sexual brotherhood intertwined with the political aspects of Ireland and England. In Edward II, Ireland is a place that accepts sexual brotherhood, and it is the only place, outside of England, that exposes male bonds and extreme homoerotic scenes. The relationship between Gaveston and Edward is interconnected with the political aspects of Ireland and England. Edward referring to Gaveston as a 'Brother' shows the intimacy between the two rather than just calling him a 'Friend'.

==== Homophobia ====
Some scholars argue that homophobia is represented by the banishment of Gaveston by deceased king Edward I for being a bad influence on King Edward II. Mortimer describes Gaveston as someone who corrupts, dishonors and shames the court of the King, thus showing the homophobia of the state. Mortimer's homophobia is possibly rooted in his loyalty to deceased king Edward I, whom he sees as a father figure of the kingdom. Mortimer constantly threatens to kill Gaveston because of his fear of homosexuality. Mortimer has an obsession with his sword, which is associated with a fear of castration as a punishment for sodomy and homosexuality. Throughout the play, Mortimer insults Gaveston as a form of homophobic violence (and he does eventually kill Gaveston and Edward II); it's also possible that his extreme violence is rooted from his repressed homosexuality and his fear of feminization. In other words, Mortimer is desperately trying to get rid of people, Gaveston, Edward and Spencer(s), who trigger his homoerotic impulses. The method with which Edward II is assassinated, a hot poker through his anus, is a symbolic death of homophobia of both the state and Mortimer. How Edward II is tortured and killed in the sewer of his castle is symbolic of sodomy and homophobia. The barons, on the other hand, have a fear of sodomy being a threat to a heterosexual relationship between the queen and the king.

According to other scholars, however, homosexuality itself is not regarded as highly evil by characters in the play. The introduction to the 2009 New Mermaids edition of the play explains: "The case is complex and remarkably distinct from the Elizabethan moralists' theologically derived attitude to gay sexuality. Edward's 'wanton humour' (403) is not the central problem: Mortimer Senior has already made a strong argument for tolerating the King's liking for catamites. Homosexuality is not considered intrinsically unnatural". Kitamura Sae argues, "It is not homosexuality or promiscuity but Gaveston's upward mobility that most disgusts Mortimer".

=== Religion ===
Edward II presents tension between the church and the state. When Edward and Gaveston strip the Bishop of Coventry of his lands and possessions, they joke subversively about religious traditions. Edward and Gaveston mock the Bishop as they attack him. Before the play takes place, the Bishop advocates for Gaveston's exile. As Edward and Gaveston attack the Bishop, they mock Catholic symbols as they assert their power over the Bishop:

Gaveston: "Saving your reverence, you must pardon me."
[He lays hold of him.]
Edward: "Throw off his golden mitre, rend his stole,
And in the channel christen him anew."
(1.1.185–189)

Edward and Gaveston attack the symbols of the church—baptisms, pardons and church attire—to humiliate the Bishop. After Edward allows Gaveston to take the Bishop's possessions, Gaveston states, "A prison may beseem his holiness" (1.1.206). Later in the play, the Archbishop of Canterbury threatens to "discharge these lords / Of duty and allegiance to [Edward]", and Edward asks, "Why should a king be subject to a priest?" (1.4.61–62, 96). In her essay "Marlowe, History, and Politics", Paulina Kewes asserts that Edward II uses religious history to comment on politics: "Marlowe...[invites] the audience to consider the contingent religious colouring of the conflict between the crown and the nobility...Marlowe's target is the widespread use of religion to justify political heterodoxy."

=== Social status ===
Edward II is a play that is deeply aware of social status and its relationship to birthrights. Mortimer is deeply resentful of Gaveston's social mobility and repeatedly claims that Gaveston is "hardly a gentleman by birth" (1.4.29). Later, when Mortimer Senior asserts that "the mightiest kings have had their minions" (1.4.390), Mortimer responds that Gaveston's "wanton humour grieves [him] not, but this [he scorns], that one so basely born / Should by his sovereign's favour grow so pert / And riot it with the treasure of the realm" (1.4.401–404). The nobility's treatment of Spencer and Spencer Senior mirrors their treatment of Gaveston. When Spencer and Lancaster start arguing about treason, Pembroke responds by calling Spencer a "base upstart" (3.3.21). The nobility also call Spencer a flatterer multiple times. However, in Edward II, social mobility, social status, and power come with consequences. Clifford Leech shows how the play ties together themes of power, social status, and suffering, stating, "In Tamburlaine [Marlowe] had already contemplated power, and saw the spectacle inevitably involved suffering. Here the suffering, still consequential on the exercise and the dream of power, is the major fact." Leech notes that each of the characters who strives for power or holds a powerful position in the play—Edward, Gaveston, the Queen and Mortimer—each meets a tragic end as they vie for power

== Influence ==
Many authors see the influence of Edward II in William Shakespeare's Richard II. The two plays have similar structures, and critics have drawn parallels between particular passages and themes, such as the contradiction between the king's theoretical absolute power and the actual restraints placed on him by his subjects. Charles Lamb opined that "The reluctant pangs of abdicating Royalty in Edward furnished hints which Shakespeare scarce improved in his Richard the Second". According to Lisa Hopkins, Marlowe's play influenced Mary Shelley's novel Valperga (1823), in which the protagonist Castruccio becomes a favourite first of Edward II and then of Gaveston.

== Stage history and adaptations ==
According to Andrew Gurr, the first-known performance of Edward II was in 1592 by the Earl of Pembroke's Men, possibly at the Theatre. Roslyn Knutson has speculated on the original performance for Edward II. In her essay, "Marlowe, Company Ownership, and the Role of Edward II", she argues that Edward II was written for Edward Alleyn and Strange's Men; however, Pembroke's Men performed Edward II with Richard Burbage (the most prominent actor in William Shakespeare's playing company) as Edward. Knutson uses the number of lines assigned to players, Marlowe's familiarity to the different play companies, and the role of Isabella to provide evidence for her argument. She concludes that Burbage's performance in Edward II influenced how Shakespeare designed roles for Burbage.

The first quarto of 1594 states that the play had been performed by the Earl of Pembroke's Men. According to E. K. Chambers, Edward II was one of three plays sold to booksellers—along with The Taming of a Shrew and The True Tragedy of Richard Duke of York—and was probably the only one of those three not worked on by Shakespeare. Mathew Martin argues that Roger Barnes's 1612 version of Edward II—while traditionally seen as a corrupt publishing of the play—reveals how the play was received in Jacobean England and how the play was revised to draw attention to King James's controversial promotion of male favorites. The title page of the 1622 edition states that the play was performed by Queen Anne's Men at the Red Bull Theatre, showing that Edward II was still in the active repertory well into the seventeenth century.

Beginning with William Poel's 1903 Elizabethan Stage Society production in Oxford, the play has been revived many times. Although Poel's production heavily censored the text's homoerotic lines, later twentieth- and twenty-first-century productions have often made explicit Edward's homosexuality.

The Warwick Pageant of 1906, in its sixth episode, "portrayed scenes and lines from Edward II leading up to the execution of the historical Gaveston at nearby Blacklow Hill."

Marlowe's play was revived in November 1961 in a student performance at the University of Nottingham. A 1969 production directed by Clifford Williams for Theatre Toronto featured prominent Stratford Festival actors, including William Hutt as Edward II and Richard Monette as Gaveston.

It was frequently revived in the 1970s. The Prospect Theatre Company's production of the play, starring Ian McKellen and James Laurenson, caused a sensation when it was broadcast by the BBC during the 1970s (as it included the first gay kiss transmitted on British television). In 1975 the play was performed on Broadway with Norman Snow as King Edward, Patti LuPone as Prince Edward, David Schramm as Kent, and Peter Dvorsky as Gaveston.

In 1977, the 26-episode BBC radio drama Vivat Rex included an abridged version of the play as its first two episodes. John Hurt portrayed Edward.

In 1986, Nicholas Hytner directed a production at the Royal Exchange, Manchester with Ian McDiarmid, Michael Grandage, Iain Glen and Duncan Bell.

Numerous other productions followed, starring actors such as Simon Russell Beale and Joseph Fiennes.

In 1991, the play was adapted into a film by Derek Jarman which used modern costumes and made overt reference to the gay rights movement and the Stonewall riots. In 1995 a ballet adaptation was created for Stuttgart Ballet.

The Washington, D.C.'s Shakespeare Theatre Company 2007 staging used mostly fascist-era and jazz-age costumes. The production strongly emphasized the gay relationship between Edward II and Gaveston and was one of two Marlowe works inaugurating the company's new Sidney Harman Hall.

In 2011, EM-LOU Productions staged the play at The Rose Theatre, Bankside, returning it for the first time in 400 years to the space where it may have had its very first production. The production was directed by Peter Darney.

In October 2013, the New National Theatre Tokyo staged the play in Japanese, featuring Mori Shintaro as a director.

In July 2016, an adaptation opened at Malthouse Theatre, Melbourne, Australia, directed by Matthew Lutton and written by Anthony Weigh.

In 2017, Berlin's Deutsche Oper staged the world-premiere of Andrea Lorenzo Scartazzini's opera Edward II, based in part on Marlowe's play.

In January 2019, An Other Theater Company in Provo, Utah staged the play for the first time in the state. The production was co-directed by Jessamyn Svensson and Kailey Azure Green.

In December 2019, the play was once again revived by the Nottingham New Theatre at the University of Nottingham, 59 years after the first revival.

In 2025, the play was performed by the Royal Shakespeare Company at the Swan Theatre, Stratford-Upon-Avon, with Daniel Evans in the titular role.

In August 2025, an adaptation of the play, Edward (In Memoriam), written by Noah Robinson for Bristol DramSoc, was performed at the Edinburgh Festival Fringe.

=== Bertolt Brecht's adaptation ===
The play was adapted by Bertolt Brecht and Lion Feuchtwanger in 1923 as The Life of Edward II of England (Leben Eduards des Zweiten von England). The Brecht version, while acknowledging Marlowe's play as its source, uses Brecht's own words, ideas and structure, and is regarded as a separate work. The German premiere took place in 1924 under Brecht's direction at the Munich Kammerspiele with Erwin Faber and Hans Schweikart as Edward and Baldock; the New York premiere of Brecht's play took place in 1982, staged by W. Stuart McDowell by the Riverside Shakespeare Company, sponsored by Joseph Papp and the New York Shakespeare Festival at The Shakespeare Center on Manhattan's Upper West Side.

== Notes ==
Sources

- Bartels, Emily (1993). Spectacles of Strangeness. University of Pennsylvania Press.
- Chambers, E. K. The Elizabethan Stage. 4 volumes, Oxford, Clarendon Press, 1923.
- Logan, Terence P.; Smith, Denzell S., eds. (1973). The Predecessors of Shakespeare: A Survey and Bibliography of Recent Studies in English Renaissance Drama. Lincoln, Nebraska: University of Nebraska Press.
