= Samuel H. Scripps =

American philanthropist (1927–2007)

Samuel Henrick Scripps (October 30, 1927 – February 16, 2007) was a patron of the arts, and played a significant role in gaining support and recognition for theatre and dance companies throughout America in the second half of the twentieth century.

== A life in the theatre ==
Born and raised on what became known as the Scripps Ranch in San Diego, California, in 1927, Scripps was the grandson of Edward Willis Scripps, American newspaper publisher and founder of The E. W. Scripps Company, and United Press International. Early in his life, Scripps developed a love for Shakespeare, as well as for dance. With his wife, Luise Elcanness Scripps, who was a specialist on the dance of India, Scripps was instrumental in promoting and supporting dance and theatre throughout America.

Scripps worked as assistant technical director for the Old Globe Theater in San Diego, the Berkeley Shakespeare Festival, as well as Lighting Designer for the Riverside Shakespeare Company, for which he was also a major donor to the first center for performance and training of the works of Shakespeare in New York City, The Shakespeare Center. From 1988 to 1994, he was partner with W. Stuart McDowell in McDowell/Scripps Productions, developing new plays for the American stage, including The Brothers Booth!, which was workshopped in New York with David Strathairn, David Dukes, Maryann Plunkett, Angela Goethals, and Stephen Lang. In later years, Scripps also became a major donor and supporter of Theatre for a Young Audience in New York. In recognition of Scripps' financial support for the rebuilding of the Globe Theatre in London, Sam Wanamaker, head of the Shakespeare Globe Trust, said, "Sam Scripps is playing a key role in spearheading the plans to make the recreation of Shakespeare's Globe in London a reality." Eventually, even after Mr. Wanamaker's death in 1993, Scripps went on to become a key American donor to the rebuilding of Shakespeare's Globe Theatre in London in 1997.

In addition to his involvement with numerous theatre and dance companies, Scripps was a professional lighting designer, technical director, photographer and film maker, as well as a member of arts boards throughout America. In 1992, in recognition for his support of theatre and dance, specifically for the development of new lighting technology, Scripps was awarded the first Honorary Lifetime Membership to the United States Institute for Theatre Technology (USITT).

== Influence on the world of dance ==
Scripps played an important role in recognizing the importance of dance choreography in America. In addition to lending his financial support to various dance programs from California to New York, in 1981 he established and endowed the Samuel H. Scripps American Dance Festival Award for Lifetime Achievement in Choreography. The award, given annually, is administered by American Dance Festival. The award, which carries a gift of $50,000, is one of the most prestigious awards of its kind, and its recipients have been some of the most important dance choreographers in America in the second half of the 20th century.

The recipients of this prestigious award include Martha Graham (1981), Merce Cunningham (1982), Paul Taylor (1983), Hanya Holm (1984), Alwin Nikolais (1985), Katherine Dunham (1986), Alvin Ailey (1987), Erick Hawkins (1988), Doris Humphrey, Charles Weidman and José Limón (1989), Twyla Tharp (1990), Anna Sokolow (1991), Donald McKayle (1992), Talley Beatty (1993), Trisha Brown (1994), Pearl Primus and Helen Tamiris (1995), Meredith Monk (1996), Anna Halprin (1997), Fayard and Harold Nicholas (1998), Pina Bausch (1999), Pilobolus Dance Theatre (2000), Garth Fagan (2001), Maguy Marin (2003), the Japanese-born dance duo Eiko and Koma (2004), Bill T. Jones (2005), Murray Louis (2006), and Mark Morris (2007).

His wife, Luise, dedicated her life to the dance of India, and donated her extensive collection of books and materials on the history of the dance of India to the Balasaraswati Performing Arts Centre. Luise Scripps was major supporters of the study and performance of the dance of India, where the Sam and Luise had once lived. In 1991, Luise Scripps established the Balasaraswati/Joy Anne Dewey Beinecke Chair for Distinguished Teaching, with additional support from Walter Beinecke, the daughters of Joy Anne Dewey Beinecke, and the ADF.

As a testament to the impact the Scripps had upon American dance, the American Dance Festival dedicated their season to Samuel H. Scripps and Luise Elcanness Scripps in 1999. In 2012, the ADF opened the Samuel H. Scripps Studios in Durham, North Carolina. The space houses two studios on the upper level, and retail space on the lower level.

Scripps served on the boards of the Paul Taylor Dance Company, the American Dance Festival, the Theatre for a New Audience, the Rhinebeck Performing Arts Center, and the Brooklyn Academy of Music. Scripps also became one of the major contributors to the Globe Theatre Project in London, playing a major role in the establishment of the replica of Shakespeare's Globe Theatre in London today.

In his obituary in The New York Times of February 17, 2007, it was noted:

Mr. Scripps spent most of his life in the theater ... In the 1950s he served as assistant technical director at the Old Globe Theater in San Diego and the Berkeley Shakespeare Festival (which later became the California Shakespeare Festival). After moving to New York in 1980, he continued his career as lighting designer for the Riverside Shakespeare Company. He has also worked as a photographer and film maker, working for both the San Diego Zoo and the Scripps Institution of Oceanography, which included a four month expedition to the Fugi Islands and Tahiti ... With his wife, Luise Scripps, he founded and ran the American Society for Eastern Arts, a not for profit organization dedicated to bringing classical performing artists from Asia to America to present performances and workshops. In 1981, he established the Samuel H. Scripps American Dance Festival Award for Lifetime Achievement in Choreography. The award is given annually and is administered by the Association for the American Dance Festival ... Mr. Scripps served on the Boards of the Paul Taylor Dance Company, the American Dance Festival in Durham, NC, the Brooklyn Academy of Music, the Theater for a New Audience, the Rhinebeck Performing Arts Center and was a major contributor to the Globe Theater Project in London. Mr. Scripps' grandfather, Edward W. Scripps, founded United Press International (UPI) and the Scripps-Howard newspaper chain, which at one time was the nation's largest. His father, Robert P. Scripps, was a reporter and correspondent, as well as editorial director of various Scripps-Howard and Scripps-McRae newspapers.

In August 2007, the Theatre for a New Audience honored Samuel H. Scripps by presenting the Samuel H. Scripps Award for Extraordinary Commitment to Promoting the Power of Language in Classical and Contemporary Theatre to Miss Cicely Berry, OBE. Hon.D.Lit, and a member of Theatre for a New Audience's Artistic Council. Sam's philanthropic work and his love for children — allowing them a safe place to explore modern dance, theater and puppetry — can also be seen in his donation to establish Cocoon Theatre in Rhinebeck, New York, where Scripps lived with his wife, Luise, during the last years of his life.

Scripps was an important member of the American arts community, contributing to the success of many in the area of theater and dance, through his talent, his passion, and his considerable generosity.
