= Shakespeare in the Park (New York City) =

Theatrical program (founded 1954)

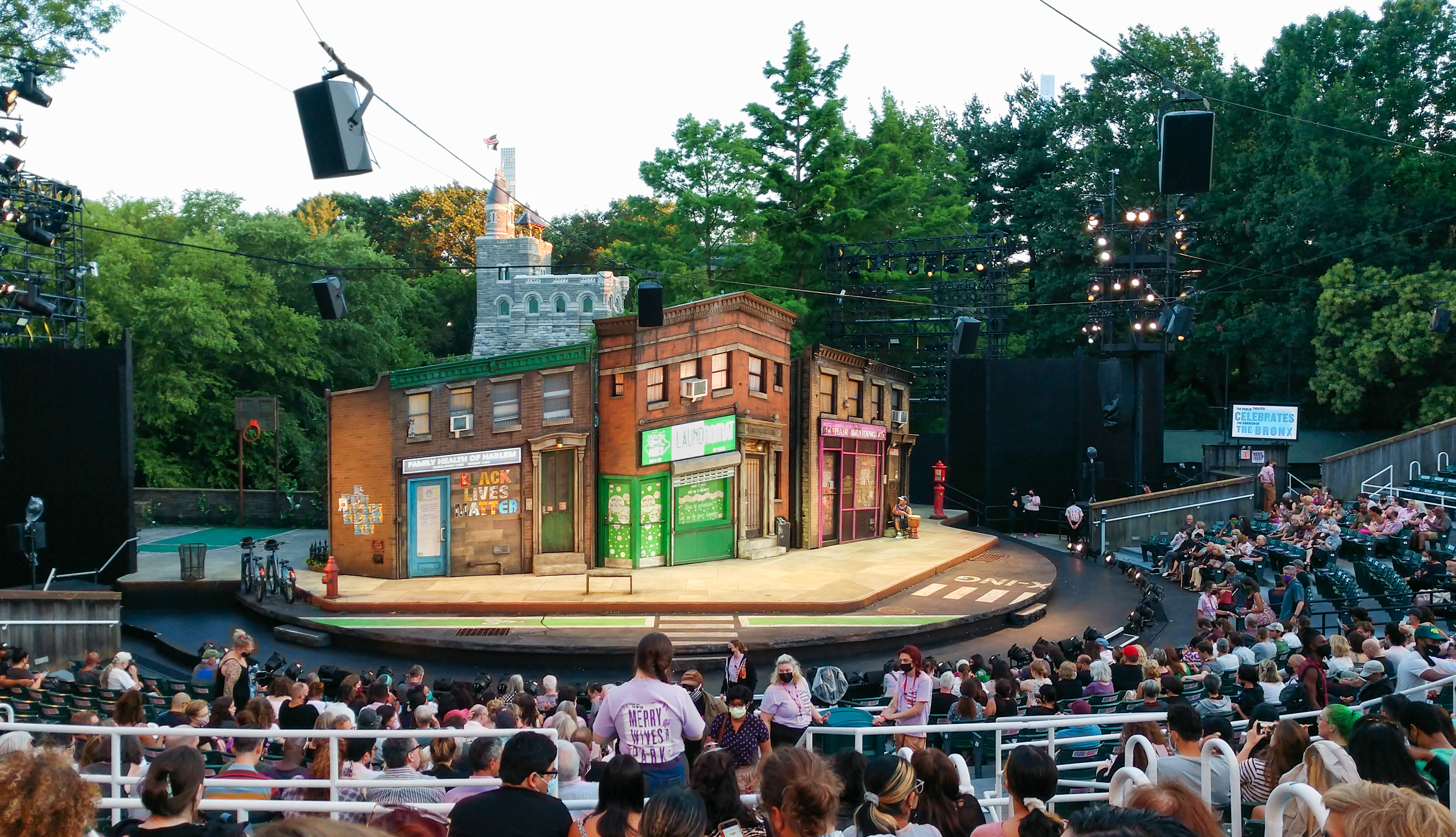
Shakespeare in the Park in July 2021. The production is Merry Wives.

Shakespeare in the Park (or Free Shakespeare in the Park) is a theatrical program that stages productions of Shakespeare plays at the Delacorte Theater, an open-air theater in New York City's Central Park. The theater and the productions are managed by The Public Theater and tickets are distributed free of charge on the day of the performance. Originally branded as the New York Shakespeare Festival (NYSF) under the direction of Joseph Papp, the institution was renamed in 2002 as part of a larger reorganization by the Public Theater.

== History ==
The festival was originally conceived by director-producer Joseph Papp in 1954. Papp began with a series of Shakespeare workshops, then moved on to free productions on the Lower East Side. Eventually, the plays moved to a lawn in front of Turtle Pond in Central Park. In 1959, parks commissioner Robert Moses demanded that Papp and his company charge a fee for the performances to cover the cost of "grass erosion." A court battle ensued. Papp continued to fight Moses, winning his enduring respect and the quote "well, let's build the bastard a theater." Following this, Moses requested funds from the city for the construction of a tiered theater in the park. In 1962, the Delacorte Theater was built. The Delacorte's first show, Shakespeare's The Merchant of Venice, starring George C. Scott and James Earl Jones, was held that same year.

== Description ==
=== Location and allure ===
The Delacorte Theater is an open-air amphitheater located on the southwest corner of the Great Lawn in Central Park, closest to the entrance at 81st Street and Central Park West. Construction of the theater was completed in 1962, with the building to be named after the theater's benefactor George T. Delacorte Jr.

Belvedere Castle and Turtle Pond provide a backdrop for the shows at the Delacorte. Shows at the Delacorte begin at 8:00 PM. Since 1962 the Public has had the privilege of its exclusive use.

=== Ticket distribution ===
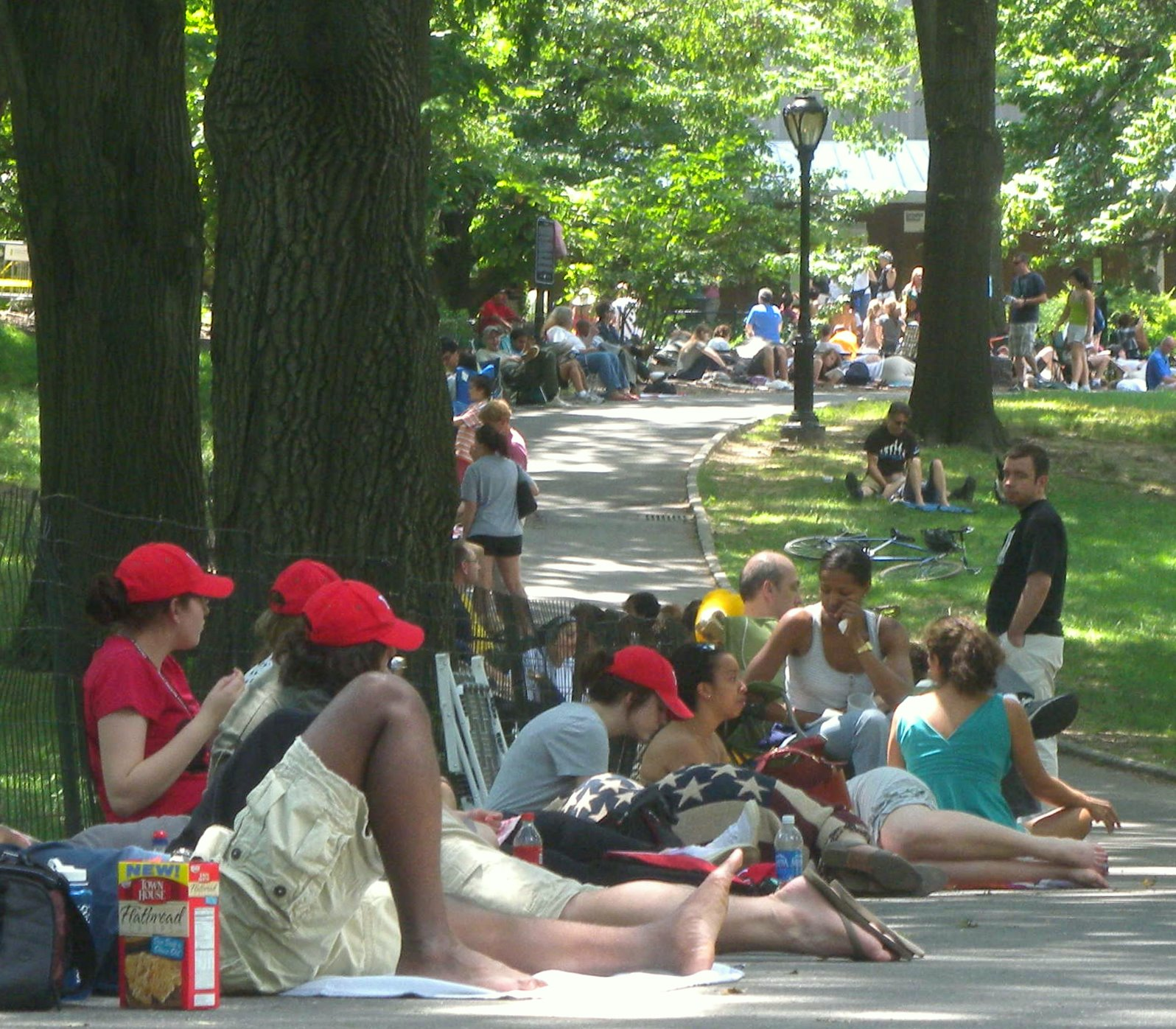
Awaiting tickets

Tickets to Shakespeare in the Park are free and tickets for a given performance are distributed the same day by various methods:

- Central Park distribution – Up to two tickets per person are distributed outside the Delacorte Theater. The line for tickets forms when the park opens at 6 a.m. and grows until tickets are distributed at noon. A separate line is available for senior citizens 65 and older with valid I.D. The ADA Accessible line is intended for patrons with disabilities and can be joined by checking in with staff at the box office the morning of a performance who will provide, as availability dictates, tickets in locations suited to various individual needs.
- Downtown Lottery – A limited number of vouchers for that evening's performance are distributed through an in-person lottery at the Public Theater. Lottery entries are accepted between 11 am and 12 pm and winners are drawn while supplies last.
- Borough distribution – A limited number of vouchers for specific performances are distributed at locations throughout New York City's five boroughs on certain days during the run of a production. Each person in line is allowed two vouchers and each voucher is good for one ticket for that evening's performance. Vouchers must be exchanged for tickets at the Delacorte Theater box office that same day from 5:00 p.m. to 7:30 p.m. Tickets cannot be exchanged in the event the performance is rained-out which is a possibility. A performance will never be cancelled before the scheduled start time and may continue in the rain if it is deemed safe by the production staff. Late seating is at the discretion of management and may not be granted until 30–40 minutes into the show.
- TodayTix – In 2015, the Public introduced its partnership with the app TodayTix. App users can log on and apply for the virtual lottery for that day's show. Winners are notified between 12 pm and 2:30 pm.

Shakespeare in the Park also offers specific performances throughout the summer for patrons with hearing and/or vision loss including Sign Language interpreted performances, audio-described performances, and open-captioned performances.

=== Productions ===
Each summer since the Delacorte's opening has seen between one and three works produced, with two works being standard since 1973. The plays of Shakespeare account for about four-fifths of the works produced, and, except for 1977 and 1980, each summer's line-up has included at least one work by Shakespeare (or, in the case of 1970, one work adapted from Shakespeare). Non-Shakespeare productions have included plays such as Anton Chekhov's The Seagull and Henrik Ibsen's Peer Gynt and musicals such as On the Town, Into the Woods, Two Gentlemen of Verona, The Mystery of Edwin Drood, and Disney's Hercules, the latter three having made their world debuts at the Delacorte.

The 2017 production of Julius Caesar, directed by the Public's artistic director, Oskar Eustis, stoked controversy by creating significant visual and behavioral similarities between the production's Caesar and recently inaugurated U.S. president Donald Trump. Despite the fact that the play is widely viewed as a cautionary tale against political violence, right-wing activists objected to what they characterized as the murder of a stand-in for Trump and interrupted two performances. Bank of America and Delta withdrew their sponsorship of the production; Bank of America resumed its sponsorship of Shakespeare in the Park by the following season, and JetBlue replaced Delta.

Due to the effects of the COVID-19 pandemic, the 2020 season was cancelled; a budget shortfall of $20 million was predicted.

=== Funding ===
The Public Theater is heavily reliant on private donors. In 2005, the theater company was among 406 New York City arts and social service institutions to receive part of a $20 million grant from the Carnegie Corporation, which was made possible through a donation by then-Mayor Michael Bloomberg.

== Popularity and acclaim ==
Many plays from the summer festival have gone on to Broadway, including Wilford Leach's staging of The Mystery of Edwin Drood from the 1984–85 season and The Tempest from the 1995–96 season. The festival has also attracted many well-known actors, such as Meryl Streep, Morgan Freeman, Martin Sheen, and Al Pacino – the latter two of whom appeared as Brutus and Marc Antony in a toga-clad historical production of Julius Caesar, directed by Stuart Vaughan in 1987, in the first of the NYSF's Shakespeare Marathon. Since its inception, the festival has become popular with both New York natives and visitors to the city, and while the Delacorte Theater has 1,872 seats, prospective theatergoers can expect to sit in line for hours before the early afternoon ticket distribution. Approximately 80,000 people attend Shakespeare in the Park every year.

== Sponsorship of other theatres ==
Over the years, the New York Shakespeare Festival supported other theatre companies throughout New York, helping to foster the growth of Off-Broadway, as well as specific theatre programs and projects. Among these companies that benefited from NYSF during critical periods of their development was the Theatre for a New Audience. The Theatre for a New Audience developed a number of productions sponsored by the NYSF, including A Midsummer Nights Dream, presented at the Anspacher Theatre, and through this sponsorship, the company was able to grow and expand its outreach to new audiences.

Another such company was the Riverside Shakespeare Company. The Festival, under Papp's leadership, sponsored several Riverside Shakespeare Company productions at a critical stage in its development, beginning with Riverside's New York premiere production of Brecht's Edward II in 1982 at The Shakespeare Center on the Upper West Side (dedicated by Joseph Papp in 1982), followed by Equity parks tours of free Shakespeare throughout the five boroughs of New York City, much as the NYSF had done for years before. Riverside Shakespeare Company summer parks tour of Free Shakespeare sponsored by the NYSF began with A Comedy of Errors in 1982, followed by The Merry Wives of Windsor, featuring Anna Deavere Smith in her New York stage debut as Mistress Quickly, Romeo and Juliet, and The Taming of the Shrew. During the NYSF period of support, the Riverside Shakespeare Company expanded greatly, offering for the first time The Shakespeare Project in 1983, and serving a wide range of audiences in the five boroughs.

== See also ==
- Shakespeare in the Park festivals
- Hudson Classical Theater Company, another Shakespeare-in-the-Park program
