= Jeffrey Masten =

American academic

Jeffrey A. Masten (born June 10, 1964) is an American academic specializing in Renaissance English literature and culture and the history of sexuality. He is the author and editor of numerous books and scholarly articles. Masten's book Queer Philologies was awarded the 2018 Elizabeth Dietz Prize for the best book in the field of early modern drama by the journal SEL: Studies in English Literature 1500–1900. He was named a Guggenheim Fellow in English Literature for 2022.

== Education and career ==
Masten earned a B.A. in English literature and music at Denison University in 1986. He received M.A. and Ph.D. degrees in English literature at the University of Pennsylvania in 1991, with a Ph.D. dissertation under the direction of Margreta de Grazia and Peter Stallybrass. At Pennsylvania, he was a Mellon Fellow in the Humanities. He began his teaching career in the English Department at Harvard University, where he was Gardner Cowles Associate Professor in the Humanities. At Harvard, Masten was executive secretary and a board member of the English Institute. He became an Associate Professor of English at Northwestern University in 1998 and is currently Professor of English and Gender and Sexuality Studies at Northwestern. He has also taught at the Folger Institute of the Folger Shakespeare Library in Washington, DC. Masten was Director of Northwestern's Gender Studies Program from 2005-2008.

== Scholarly publications ==
Masten's published books and articles include influential and "controversial" writing on Renaissance dramatic collaboration and authorship by Shakespeare and his contemporaries, as well as on the early history of sexuality. In 2012 Masten discovered a previously unknown first-edition copy of Christopher Marlowe's 1594 play Edward II, only the second existing copy of the play. He has written influentially on early women's writing in English and on the language of sexuality in early English history. His selected publications include:

- Editor, Edward II, by Christopher Marlowe, critical edition (Arden Early Modern Drama/Arden Shakespeare/Bloomsbury Publishing, 2026)
- Textual Intercourse: Collaboration, Authorship, and Sexualities in Renaissance Drama (Cambridge University Press, 1997)
- Editor, with Peter Stallybrass and Nancy J. Vickers, Language Machines: Technologies of Literary and Cultural Production (Routledge, 1997)
- Editor, An/The Old Law, by Thomas Middleton, William Rowley, et al., in Thomas Middleton: The Collected Works, and Thomas Middleton and Early Modern Textual Culture: A Companion to the Collected Works, gen. ed. Gary Taylor et al. (Oxford University Press, 2007)
- "Bound for Germany: Heresy, sodomy, and a new copy of Marlowe's Edward II". Times Literary Supplement. Dec. 21 & 28, 2012, pp. 17–19.
- Queer Philologies: Sex, Language, and Affect in Shakespeare's Time (University of Pennsylvania Press, 2016). Winner of the 2018 Elizabeth Dietz Memorial Prize for best book in Tudor and Stuart drama.

Since 1997 Masten has been a co-editor of the scholarly journal Renaissance Drama.

== Awards ==
Masten is the recipient of fellowships from the John Simon Guggenheim Memorial Foundation, Folger Shakespeare Library, Newberry Library, the Mellon Foundation, and the National Endowment for the Humanities (2017). Masten is the recipient of Denison University's Alumni Citation award (2017). He was awarded the thirty-fourth Calvin and Rose G. Hoffman Prize for a distinguished publication on Christopher Marlowe in 2023.

At Northwestern, Masten was awarded the E. LeRoy Hall Award for Distinguished Teaching in the Weinberg College of Arts and Sciences (2002–03), named Charles Deering McCormick Professor of Teaching Excellence in 2006, and named Herman and Beulah Pearce Miller Research Professor in Literature in 2009.

== Other activities ==
In Shakespeare studies, Masten served as a trustee of the Shakespeare Association of America (2001–03), chairperson of the Modern Language Association (MLA) Division on Shakespeare, and member of the MLA Committee on the New Variorum Edition of Shakespeare.

Masten was a member of the Denison University board of trustees from 2010-16 and was reappointed to the board in 2017.
