= List of Scripps Award recipients =

The Samuel H. Scripps American Dance Festival Award for Lifetime Achievement in Choreography is presented each year at the American Dance Festival in Durham, North Carolina. The award and its cash prize, currently $50,000, is given to modern dance choreographers in order to recognize their influence on the art form.

== 1981 to 1990 ==
- Martha Graham, presented by Betty Ford (1981)
- Merce Cunningham, Joan Mondale (1982)
- Paul Taylor, presented by Terry Sanford (1983)
- Hanya Holm, presented by Alfred Drake (1984)
- Alwin Nikolais, presented by Bessie Schonberg (1985)
- Katherine Dunham, presented by John Houseman (1986)
- Alvin Ailey, presented by Harry Belafonte (1987)
- Erick Hawkins, presented by Roger Stevens (1988)
- In memory of Doris Humphrey, Charles Weidman, and José Limón; remembrances given by Martha Hill, Lucas Hoving, Betty Jones, Pauline Koner, Ernestine Stodelle, and Janet Towner (1989)
- Twyla Tharp, presented by Charles Reinhart (1990)

== 1991 to 2000 ==
- Anna Sokolow, presented by Terry Sanford (1991)
- Donald McKayle, presented by Maya Angelou (1992)
- Talley Beatty, presented by Vinnette Carroll (1993)
- Trisha Brown, presented by Robert Rauschenberg (1994)
- In memory of Pearl Primus and Helen Tamiris; remembrances given by Joe Nash and Daniel Nagrin (1995)
- Meredith Monk, presented by Charles Reinhart (1996)
- Anna Halprin, presented by George Segal (1997)
- Fayard and Harold Nicholas, presented by Bobby Short (1998)
- Pina Bausch, presented by Harvey Lichtenstein (1999)
- Pilobolus Dance Theatre, presented by Peter Shickele (2000)

== 2001 to 2010 ==
- Garth Fagan, presented by Judith Jamison (2001)
- Maguy Marin, presented by Linda Shelton (2003)
- Eiko and Koma, presented by Joseph V. Melillo (2004)
- Bill T. Jones, presented by Thelma Golden (2005)
- Murray Louis, presented by Doug Varone (2006)
- Mark Morris, presented by Mike Ross (2007)
- Laura Dean, presented by Charles Reinhart (2008)
- Ohad Naharin, presented by Sebastian Scripps (2009)
- Martha Clarke, presented by Alfred Uhry (2010)

== 2011 to 2020 ==
- Anne Teresa De Keersmaeker, presented by Stuart Hodes (2011)
- William Forsythe, presented by Jill Johnson (2012)
- Lin Hwai-min, presented by Joseph V. Melillo (2013)
- Angelin Preljocaj, presented by Linda Shelton (2014)
- Lar Lubovitch, presented by Jonathan Emanuell Alsberry (2016)
- Lucinda Childs, presented by Kristy Edmunds (2017)
- Ronald K. Brown, presented by Dianne McIntyre (2018)

== 2021 to present ==
- Shen Wei, presented by Charles L. Reinhart (2022)
- Rennie Harris, presented by Robert Battle (2023)
- Jawole Willa Jo Zollar, presented by James Frazier (2024)
