= The Shakespeare Project =

- Formation: 1983
- Headquarters: New York City, New York, U.S.

The Shakespeare Project was a week-long residency in October 1983, organized by the Riverside Shakespeare Company in New York City. It brought actors from the Royal Shakespeare Company (RSC) to conduct workshops, panel discussions, seminars, and performances focused on making Shakespeare more accessible. Over 1,000 participants, including actors, students, and teachers, attended. The project featured a "five-hander" performance of The Merchant of Venice, Under Milk Wood, and The Tarnished Phoenix. It was praised for its educational value and helped bridge the gap between American and British Shakespearean acting techniques.

== History ==
In October 1983, the Riverside Shakespeare Company inaugurated The Shakespeare Project, based at the theatre company's home on the Upper West Side of Manhattan, The Shakespeare Center for a week of public workshops, panel discussions, seminars and performances at the company's Upper West Side theatre, The Shakespeare Center. According to The New York Times, over one thousand actors, students, teachers and stage directors attended various workshops and classes.

== Media coverage ==
According to The New York Times, until the launching of The Shakespeare Project in 1983, "the Royal Shakespeare Company's actors had never conducted their workshops in New York City and never been open to actors in addition to students."

Samuel G. Freedman wrote in The New York Times on October 24, 1983:

The British actors came to New York, at a cost of $13,000, under the sponsorship of two American groups passionate about staging Shakespeare in the United States. One is the Riverside Shakespeare Company, an Off Broadway organization with a special interest in education, which acted as host to the English. The other is the Alliance for Creative Theater Education and Research, a joint American-English group that since 1975 has sent Shakespearean actors in American colleges to train actors in performing Shakespeare.

— Samuel G. Freedman
