= The Shakespeare Center =

Theatre in New York

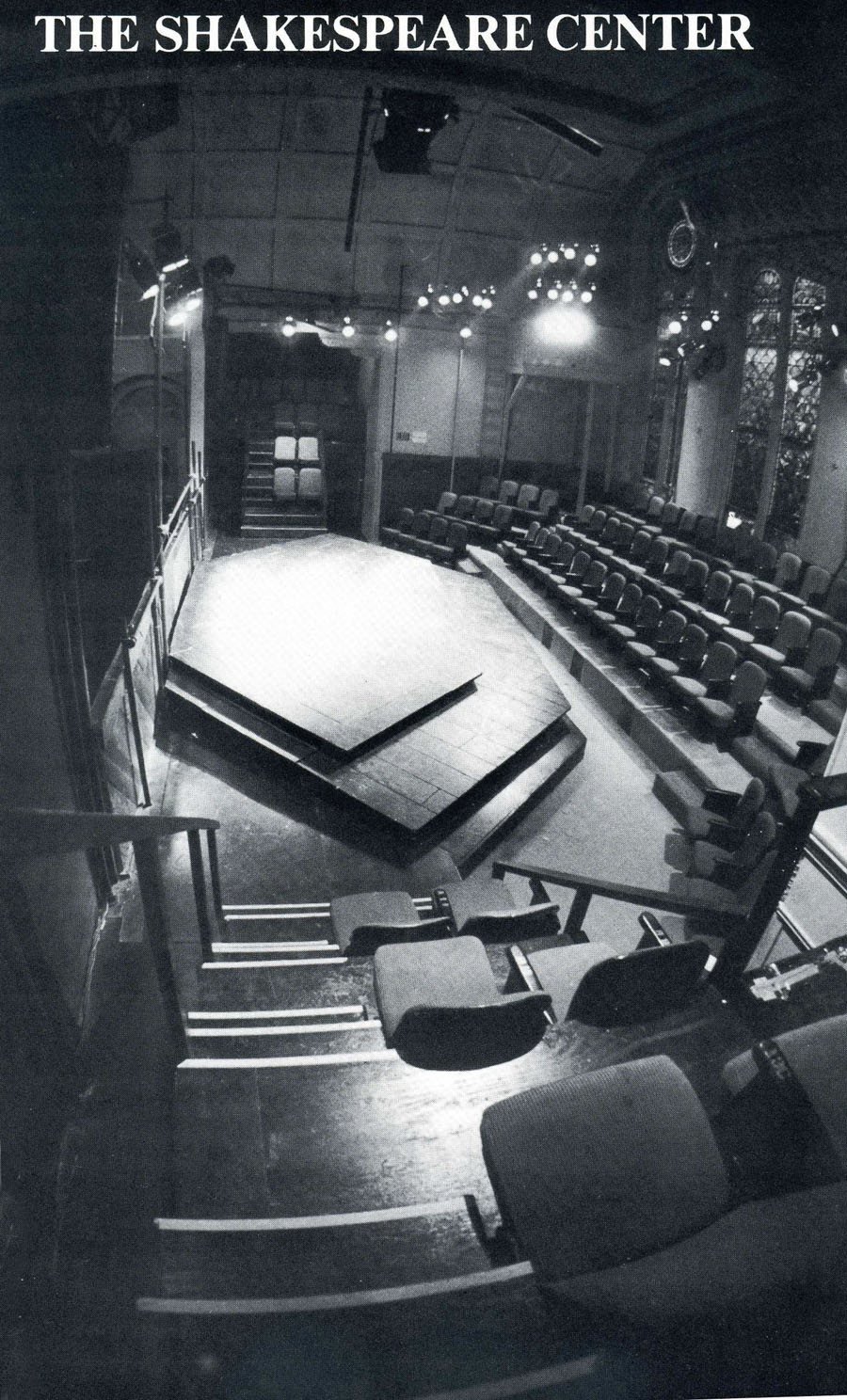
Theater at West-Park Presbyterian Church in 1982

The Shakespeare Center was the home of the Riverside Shakespeare Company, an Equity professional theatre company in New York City, established in 1980 and dedicated in 1982, when the company established its center of theatre production and advanced actor training at the 90-year-old West-Park Presbyterian Church on Amsterdam Avenue at West 86th Street. The Shakespeare Center's facilities consisted of the main offices of the Riverside Shakespeare Company, costume and set construction and storage rooms, a main lobby (shared with the church), and a theatre in the balcony of the church equipped with lighting and sound amplification.

== Design and construction ==
Within the theatre itself, two wooden towers were constructed to the sides of the audience area for follow spots and, on occasion, musicians. Seating surrounded the thrust stage on three sides, with no seat more than 18 feet from the stage. There was a crossover under the upstage edge, with traps under the stage. Although the theatre was an Off Off Broadway venue, limited to 99 seats by the company's contract with Actors Equity Association, the Riverside Shakespeare Company often launched major productions to Off Broadway status, as with its summer tours of Free Shakespeare and other specific productions. At this location the theatre began a subscription season of four to five plays, as a member of the Alliance of Resident Theatres in New York.

The main theatre of The Shakespeare Center was reconstructed in the early 1980s from materials saved from the Helen Hayes Theatre - regarded as "the loveliest theater in New York" before its demolition to make way for the Marquis Theatre in mid-town Manhattan, as well as from the strike of Broadway productions, such as Nicholas Nickleby and The Threepenny Opera. One of the principal donors to The Shakespeare Center was Samuel H. Scripps, resident Lighting Designer of the Riverside Shakespeare Company and leading arts benefactor.

As Clyde Haberman wrote in The New York Times:

To theatergoers, last year's Nicholas Nickleby and its set formed of catwalks, ramps and scaffolding are now a memory. But at West Park Presbyterian Church, on West 86th Street near Amsterdam Avenue, "Nickleby" lives. The Riverside Shakespeare Company, based at the church, will be starting its sixth season with a new stage built from the Royal Shakespeare Company's Nickleby set - which was donated complete, right down to the ropes and pipes. Railings from the demolished Helen Hayes Theater were also used in the renovation. Miss Helen Hayes and Joseph Papp spoke at a dedication this week. Mr. Papp's $5,000 gift to the Riverside Shakespeare's production fund was matched last year at a benefit done by three Nickleby cast members including Roger Rees, of the title role, who later joined the Riverside's board.

The original planked stage of The Shakespeare Center was designed by David Emmons (but was later redesigned by Norbert Kolb, Kevin Lee Allen, and Dorian Vernacchio for specific productions) from platforms donated by the Niederlander organization from the strike of the set of Nicholas Nickleby after its closing performance on Broadway. Railings and other features were acquired and installed in the theatre from the demolition of the former Helen Hayes Theatre on Broadway, when it was destroyed to make way for the Marquis Theatre in midtown Manhattan. Over the years, the theatre was expanded with materials often acquired from the strike of Broadway shows.

The design of the stage was such that major portions of the scenery were required to be removed Saturday nights after a performance, enabling the congregation of the church on Sunday morning to see the stained glass windows on the west front of the church, behind the back row of seats in the theatre itself.

Conceptual design for The Shakespeare Center stage, 1982.

The two towers of the church were converted by the theatre company into storage facilities for sets and costumes, with hoists and pulleys to raise and lower scenic components to the second balcony level, where the theatre had been built. In the north tower was constructed a costume shop, where often a dozen seamstresses worked on numerous costumes designed by a Broadway designer for a major Shakespeare production -to be presented either in the theatre or on tour during the summer. The main entrance for audiences into the theatre was beneath the south tower on West 86th Street, and into the narthex or main lobby of the church, then up the stairs to the balcony theatre above. On the ground level of the north tower, in what had formerly been the Bridal Room of the church, was established the main office of the Riverside Shakespeare Company. In addition, certain special performances were presented on a stage erected in the main sanctuary of the church, such as The Shakespeare Project with actors from the Royal Shakespeare Company of London in 1982, and Edward Petherbridge's one-person show, Acting Natural, in 1983.

== Dedication ==
Helen Hayes speaking at the dedication of the Shakespeare Center in 1982

Exterior View of The Shakespeare Center in the West Park Presbyterian Church, 1982.

The Shakespeare Center was dedicated in October 1982 by Helen Hayes, and Joseph Papp, head of the New York Shakespeare Festival in a gala ceremony attended by Gloria Foster, Mildred Natwick, Sam Waterston and Peter Brook. Ribbon cutting was done by Helen Hayes, who was a founding member of Riverside's Board of Advisors, with a dedicatory statement made by Joseph Papp, who, with the New York Shakespeare Festival, had become one of the principal sponsors of the Riverside Shakespeare Company.

At the time of the dedication of The Shakespeare Center, the Riverside Shakespeare Company was headed by W. Stuart McDowell, Artistic Director, and Gloria Skurski, Executive Director, together with Daniel Smith, Director of Riverside Shakespeare's Commedia Wing, Timothy Oman, Managing Director, John Clingerman, Associate Director and Director of the Riverside School for Shakespeare, which was also based in The Shakespeare Center, Dorian Vernacchio, Company Scenic Designer, Maureen Clark, Resident Text Coach, Jane Badgers, Director of Publicity, and by Jay King and Timothy J. Archey, Executive Assistants.

Upon launching The Shakespeare Center, Roger Rees, Associate Artist of the Royal Shakespeare Company and lead actor in that company's Broadway production of Nicholas Nickleby wrote:

Best wishes to the Riverside Shakespeare Company in their endeavor to establish a year-round professional Shakespeare ensemble in New York City. In England, the Royal Shakespeare Company receive a subsidy from the government which the company has to match by seeking commercial support from industry and keeping a strict endeavor always to play to full houses. Shakespeare, the most profound and liberated writer ever, can ironically only be performed under such strictures in our country. Support this company, your R.S.C., and they and Shakespeare will thrive to help the lives, hopes and imaginations of future generations. The Riverside Shakespeare Company share our goals and I hope they will receive generous support and encouragement from you, the public.

W. Stuart McDowell and Samuel H. Scripps shortly after the dedication of The Shakespeare Center, 1982.

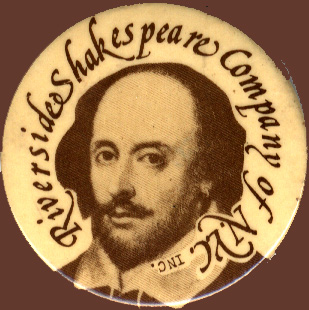
Riverside Shakespeare Company logo, 1977, as worn by Miss Hayes, above.

On the stage of The Shakespeare Center the Riverside Shakespeare Company mounted numerous productions of works by Shakespeare, his contemporaries, and Commedia dell'Arte comedies, as well as The Shakespeare Project, and major New York premieres of Bertolt Brecht's The Life of Edward II of England and Nahum Tate's adaptation of Shakespeare's King Lear, entitled The History of King Lear, directed by Artistic Director of the Shakespeare Center, W. Stuart McDowell, and sponsored by Riverside Shakespeare Company benefactor, Samuel H. Scripps (left).

== Demolition ==
The church, West Park Presbyterian Church, where The Shakespeare Center was established was at one point considered to be demolished, to make room for a new high rise apartment building.
