= Riverside Shakespeare Company =

Late-20th-century theatre company in New York

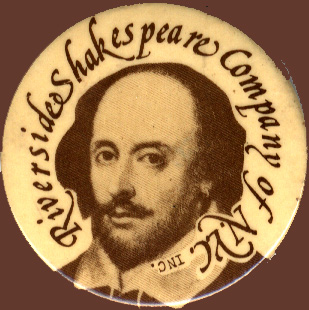
Riverside Shakespeare Company logo, 1977

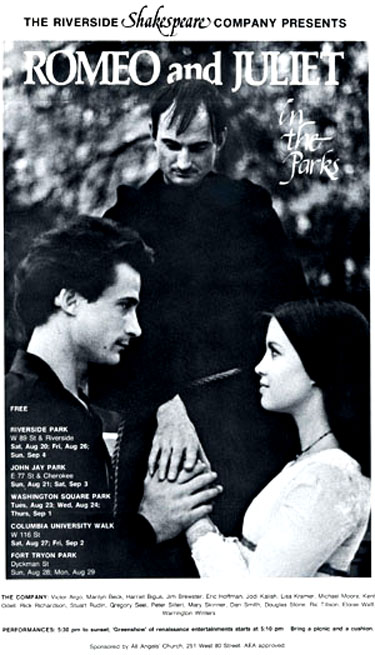
Poster: Riverside Shakespeare Company's inaugural parks tour of Romeo & Juliet. Peter Siiteri, Stuart Rudin, Eloise Watt. (1977)

The Riverside Shakespeare Company was an American theatre company founded in 1977 on the Upper West Side of New York City, by W. Stuart McDowell and Gloria Skurski. Focusing on Shakespeare plays and other classical repertoire, it operated until 1997.

== History ==
Early in the summer of 1980, the Riverside Shakespeare Company moved into residence in West Park Presbyterian Church, at the corner of West 86th and Amsterdam, where it established The Shakespeare Center, and began a professional training program, the Riverside School for Shakespeare, in the fall of 1980.

In 1982, Riverside Shakespeare Company began a series of expanded 'Free Summer Shakespeare' tours, funded through sponsorship by Joseph Papp and the New York Shakespeare Festival. In October 1983, the Riverside Shakespeare Company launched The Shakespeare Project, New York City's first major residency of actors from the Royal Shakespeare Company.

In 1985, Helen Hayes appeared in an all-star benefit performance for the Riverside Shakespeare Company of Charles Dickens' A Christmas Carol.
