= History of theatre =

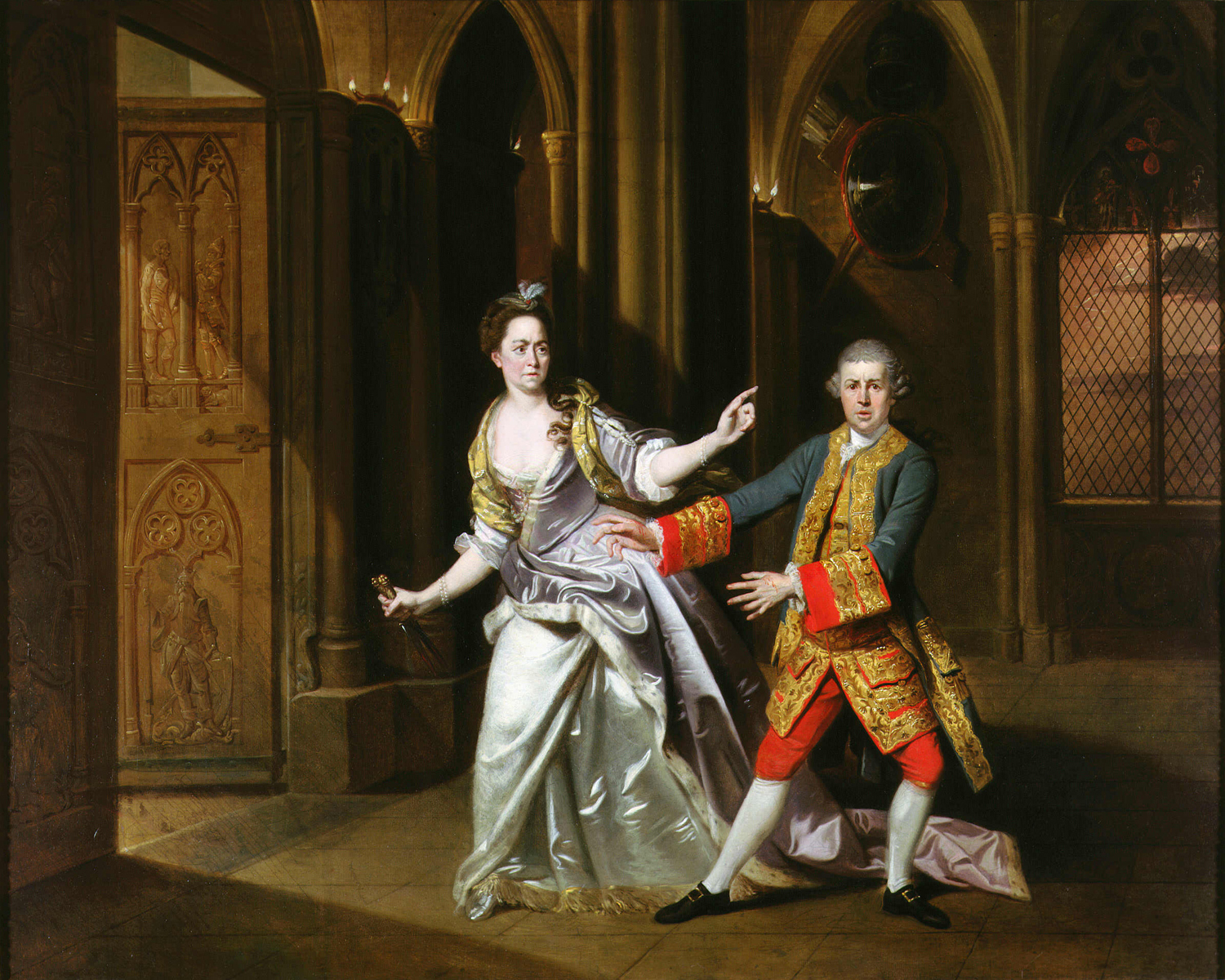
Hannah Pritchard as Lady Macbeth and David Garrick as Macbeth at the Theatre Royal, Drury Lane in April 1768

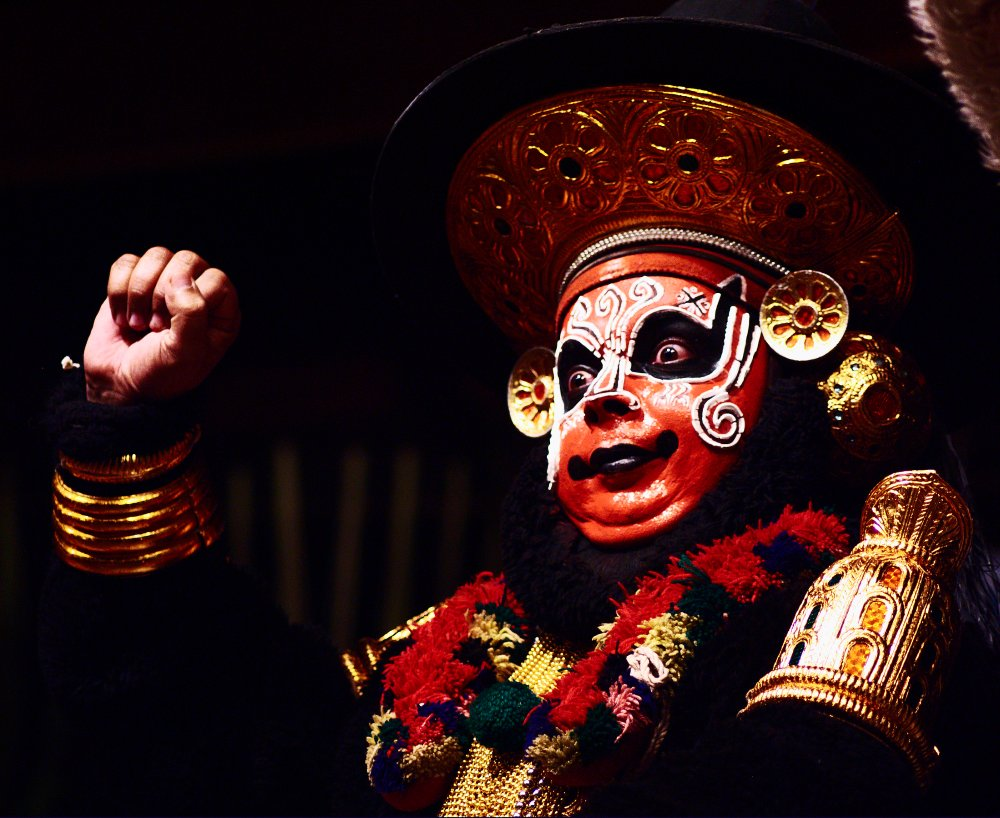
Performer playing Sugriva in the Koodiyattam form of Sanskrit theatre

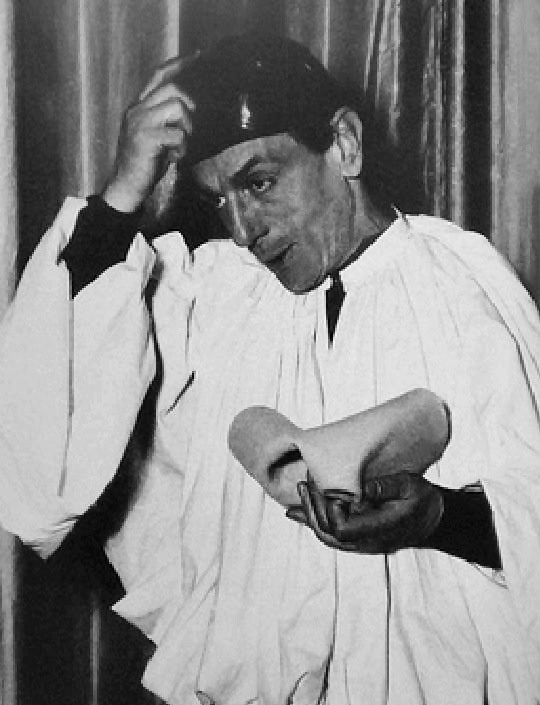
Eduardo De Filippo as Pulcinella, a character from the Italian Commedia dell'arte

The history of theatre charts the development of theatre over the past 2,500 years. While performance elements are present in every society, it is customary to acknowledge a distinction between theatre as an art form and entertainment, and theatrical or performance elements in other activities. The history of theatre is primarily concerned with the origin and subsequent development of the theatre as an autonomous activity. Since classical Athens in the 5th century BC, vibrant traditions of theatre have flourished in cultures across the world.

== Origins ==
There is no conclusive evidence that theater evolved from ritual, despite the similarities between the performance of ritual actions and theatre and the significance of this relationship. This similarity of early theatre to ritual is negatively attested by Aristotle, who in his Poetics defined theatre in contrast to the performances of sacred mysteries: theatre did not require the spectator to fast, drink the kykeon, or march in a procession; however theatre did resemble the sacred mysteries in the sense that it brought purification and healing to the spectator by means of a vision, the theama. The physical location of such performances was accordingly named theatron.

According to the historians Oscar Brockett and Franklin Hildy, rituals typically include elements that entertain or give pleasure, such as costumes and masks as well as skilled performers. As societies grew more complex, these spectacular elements began to be acted out under non-ritualistic conditions. As this occurred, the first steps towards theatre as an autonomous activity were being taken.

== European theatre ==
=== Greek theatre ===
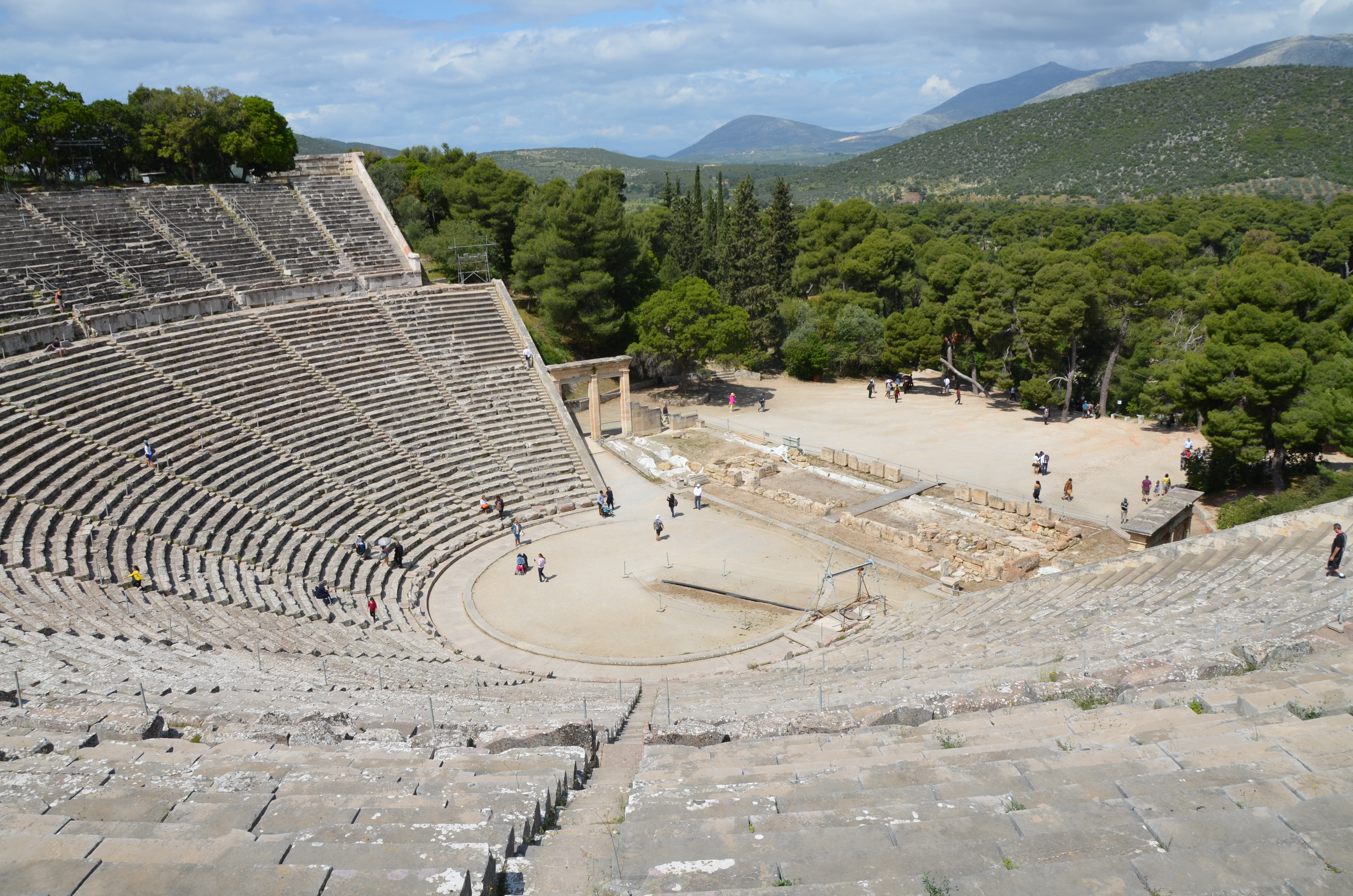
The best-preserved example of a classical Greek theatre, the Ancient Theatre of Epidaurus, has a circular orchêstra and probably gives the best idea of the original shape of the Athenian theatre, though it dates from the 4th century BC.

Greek theatre, most developed in Athens, is the root of the Western tradition; theatre is a word of Greek origin. It was part of a broader culture of theatricality and performance in classical Greece that included festivals, religious rituals, politics, law, athletics and gymnastics, music, poetry, weddings, funerals, and symposia. (Note: Goldhill argues that although activities that form "an integral part of the exercise of citizenship" (such as when "the Athenian citizen speaks in the Assembly, exercises in the gymnasium, sings at the symposium, or courts a boy") each have their "own regime of display and regulation," nevertheless the term "performance" provides "a useful heuristic category to explore the connections and overlaps between these different areas of activity" (1999, 1).) Participation in the city-state's many festivals—and attendance at the City Dionysia as an audience member (or even as a participant in the theatrical productions) in particular—was an important part of citizenship. Civic participation also involved the evaluation of the rhetoric of orators evidenced in performances in the law-court or political assembly, both of which were understood as analogous to the theatre and increasingly came to absorb its dramatic vocabulary. The theatre of ancient Greece consisted of three types of drama: tragedy, comedy, and the satyr play.

Athenian tragedy—the oldest surviving form of tragedy—is a type of dance-drama that formed an important part of the theatrical culture of the city-state. (Note: Taxidou says that "most scholars now call 'Greek' tragedy 'Athenian' tragedy, which is historically correct" (2004, 104).) Having emerged sometime during the 6th century BC, it flowered during the 5th century BC (from the end of which it began to spread throughout the Greek world) and continued to be popular until the beginning of the Hellenistic period. (Note: Cartledge writes that although Athenians of the 4th century judged Aeschylus, Sophocles, and Euripides "as the nonpareils of the genre, and regularly honoured their plays with revivals, tragedy itself was not merely a 5th-century phenomenon, the product of a short-lived golden age. If not attaining the quality and stature of the fifth-century 'classics', original tragedies nonetheless continued to be written and produced and competed with in large numbers throughout the remaining life of the democracy—and beyond it" (1997, 33).) No tragedies from the 6th century and only 32 of the more than a thousand that were performed in during the 5th century have survived. (Note: We have seven by Aeschylus, seven by Sophocles, and eighteen by Euripides. In addition, we also have the Cyclops, a satyr play by Euripides. Some critics since the 17th century have argued that one of the tragedies that the classical tradition gives as Euripides'—Rhesus—is a 4th-century play by an unknown author; modern scholarship agrees with the classical authorities and ascribes the play to Euripides; see Walton (1997, viii, xix). (This uncertainty accounts for Brockett and Hildy's figure of 31 tragedies rather than 32.)) We have complete texts extant by Aeschylus, Sophocles, and Euripides. (Note: The theory that Prometheus Bound was not written by Aeschylus adds a fourth, anonymous playwright to those whose work survives.) The origins of tragedy remain obscure, though by the 5th century it was institutionalised in competitions (agon) held as part of festivities celebrating Dionysos (the god of wine and fertility). As contestants in the City Dionysia's competition (the most prestigious of the festivals to stage drama), playwrights were required to present a tetralogy of plays (though the individual works were not necessarily connected by story or theme), which usually consisted of three tragedies and one satyr play. (Note: Exceptions to this pattern were made, as with Euripides' Alcestis in 438 BC. There were also separate competitions at the City Dionysia for the performance of dithyrambs and, after 488–7 BC, comedies.) The performance of tragedies at the City Dionysia may have begun as early as 534 BC; official records (didaskaliai) begin from 501 BC, when the satyr play was introduced. (Note: Rehm offers the following argument as evidence that tragedy was not institutionalized until 501 BC: "The specific cult honoured at the City Dionysia was that of Dionysus Eleuthereus, the god 'having to do with Eleutherae', a town on the border between Boeotia and Attica that had a sanctuary to Dionysus. At some point Athens annexed Eleutherae—most likely after the overthrow of the Peisistratid tyranny in 510 and the democratic reforms of Cleisthenes in 508-07—and the cult-image of Dionysus Eleuthereus was moved to its new home. Athenians re-enacted the incorporation of the god's cult every year in a preliminary rite to the City Dionysia. On the day before the festival proper, the cult-statue was removed from the temple near the theatre of Dionysus and taken to a temple on the road to Eleutherae. That evening, after sacrifice and hymns, a torchlight procession carried the statue back to the temple, a symbolic re-creation of the god's arrival into Athens, as well as a reminder of the inclusion of the Boeotian town into Attica. As the name Eleutherae is extremely close to eleutheria, 'freedom', Athenians probably felt that the new cult was particularly appropriate for celebrating their own political liberation and democratic reforms" (1992, 15).) Most Athenian tragedies dramatise events from Greek mythology, though The Persians—which stages the Persian response to news of their military defeat at the Battle of Salamis in 480 BC—is the notable exception in the surviving drama. (Note: Jean-Pierre Vernant argues that in The Persians Aeschylus substitutes for the usual temporal distance between the audience and the age of heroes a spatial distance between the Western audience and the Eastern Persian culture. This substitution, he suggests, produces a similar effect: "The 'historic' events evoked by the chorus, recounted by the messenger and interpreted by Darius' ghost are presented on stage in a legendary atmosphere. The light that the tragedy sheds upon them is not that in which the political happenings of the day are normally seen; it reaches the Athenian theater refracted from a distant world of elsewhere, making what is absent seem present and visible on the stage"; Vernant and Vidal-Naquet (1988, 245).) When Aeschylus won first prize for it at the City Dionysia in 472 BC, he had been writing tragedies for more than 25 years, yet its tragic treatment of recent history is the earliest example of drama to survive. More than 130 years later, the philosopher Aristotle analysed 5th-century Athenian tragedy in the oldest surviving work of dramatic theory—his Poetics (c. 335 BC). Athenian comedy is conventionally divided into three periods, "Old Comedy", "Middle Comedy", and "New Comedy". Old Comedy survives today largely in the form of the eleven surviving plays of Aristophanes, while Middle Comedy is largely lost (preserved only in relatively short fragments in authors such as Athenaeus of Naucratis). New Comedy is known primarily from the substantial papyrus fragments of plays by Menander. Aristotle defined comedy as a representation of laughable people that involves some kind of error or ugliness that does not cause pain or destruction. (Note: Aristotle, Poetics: "Comedy is, as we said, a representation of people who are rather inferior—not, however, with respect to every [kind of] vice, but the laughable is [only] a part of what is ugly. For the laughable is a sort of error and ugliness that is not painful and destructive, just as, evidently, a laughable mask is something ugly and distorted without pain" (1449a 30–35); see Janko (1987, 6).)

==== Greek theater in Magna Graecia ====
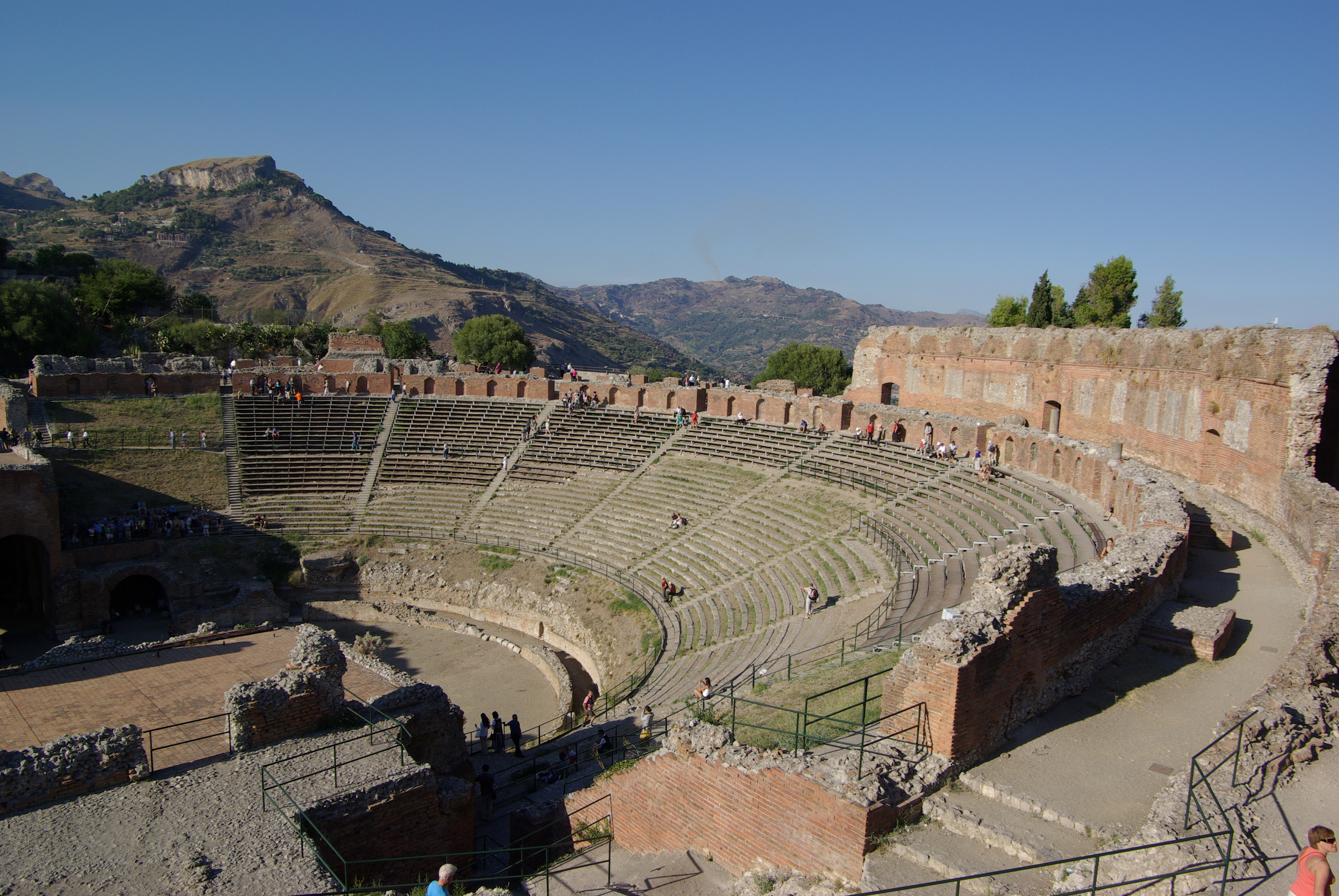
Greek Theater of Taormina, Sicily, Magna Graecia, present-day Italy

The Greek colonists in Southern Italy, the so-called Magna Graecia, brought theatrical art from their motherland. The Greek Theatre of Syracuse, the Greek Theatre of Segesta, the Greek Theatre of Tindari, the Greek Theatre of Hippana, the Greek Theatre of Akrai, the Greek Theatre of Monte Jato, the Greek Theatre of Morgantina and the most famous Greek Theater of Taormina, amply demonstrate this.

Only fragments of original dramaturgical works are left, but the tragedies of the three great giants Aeschylus, Sophocles and Euripides and the comedies of Aristophanes are known.

Some famous playwrights in the Greek language came directly from Magna Graecia. Others, such as Aeschylus and Epicharmus, worked for a long time in Sicily. Epicharmus can be considered Syracusan in all respects, having worked all his life with the tyrants of Syracuse. His comedy preceded that of the more famous Aristophanes by staging the gods for the first time in comedy. While Aeschylus, after a long stay in the Sicilian colonies, died in Sicily in the colony of Gela in 456 BC. Epicarmus and Phormis, both of 6th century BC, are the basis, for Aristotle, of the invention of the Greek comedy, as he says in his book on Poetics:

As for the composition of the stories (Epicharmus and Phormis) it came in the beginning from Sicily

— Aristotle, Poetics

Other native dramatic authors of Magna Graecia, in addition to the Syracusan Formides mentioned, are Achaeus of Syracuse, Apollodorus of Gela, Philemon of Syracuse and his son Philemon the younger. From Calabria, precisely from the colony of Thurii, came the playwright Alexis. While Rhinthon, although Sicilian from Syracuse, worked almost exclusively for the colony of Taranto in Apulia.

=== Italic theater ===
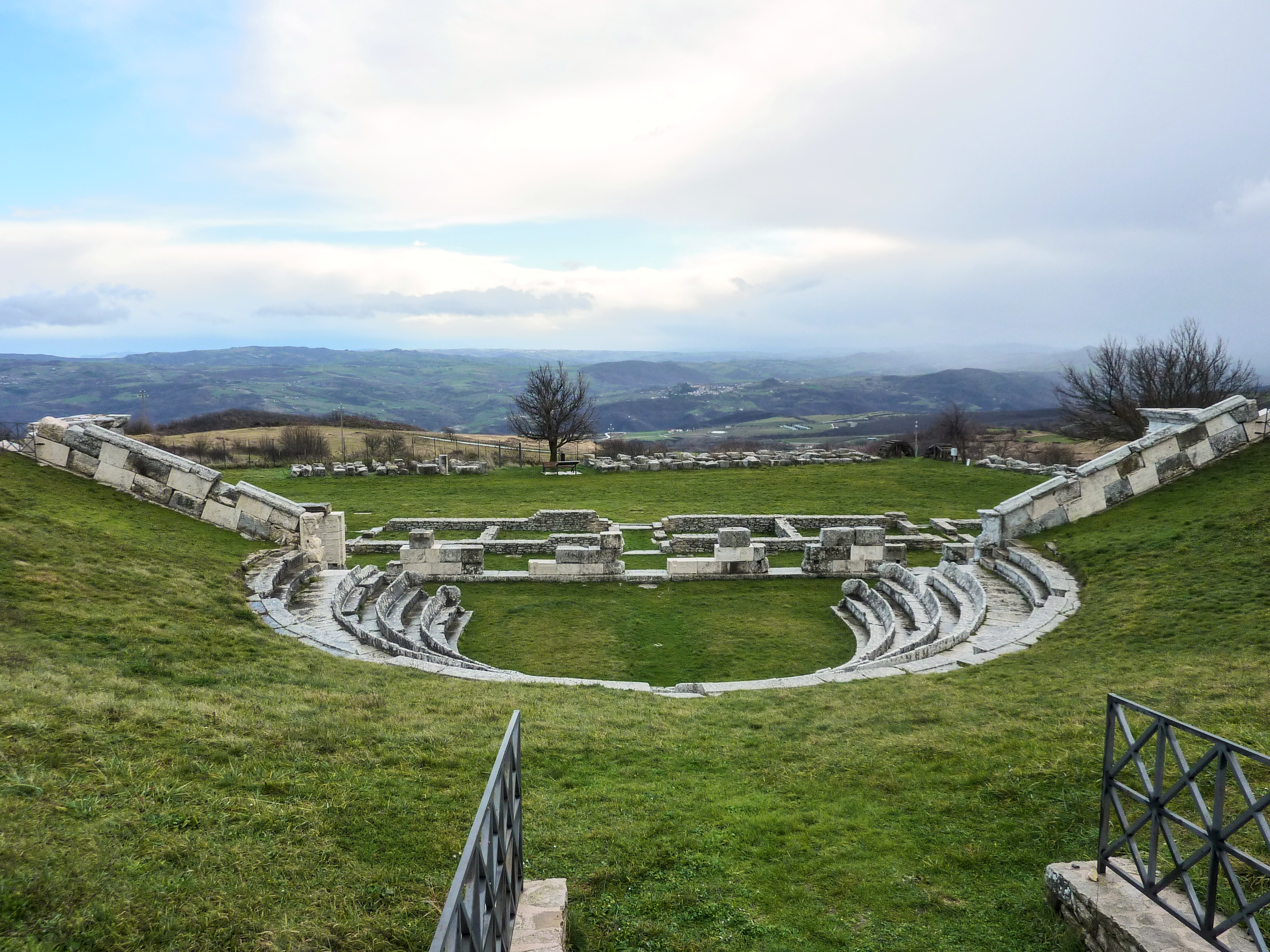
Samnite theater in Pietrabbondante, Molise, Italy

The Italic peoples such as the Etruscans had already developed forms of theatrical literature. The legend, also reported by Livy, speaks of a pestilence that had struck Rome, at the beginning, and the request for Etruscan historians. The Roman historian thus refused the filiation from the Greek theater before contacts with Magna Graecia and its theatrical traditions. There are no architectural and artistic testimonies of the Etruscan theater. A very late source, such as the historian Varro, mentions the name of a certain Volnio who wrote tragedies in the Etruscan language.

Even the Samnites had original representational forms that had a lot of influence on Roman dramaturgy such as the Atellan Farce comedies, and some architectural testimonies such as the theater of Pietrabbondante in Molise, and that of Nocera Superiore on which the Romans built their own.

=== Roman theatre ===
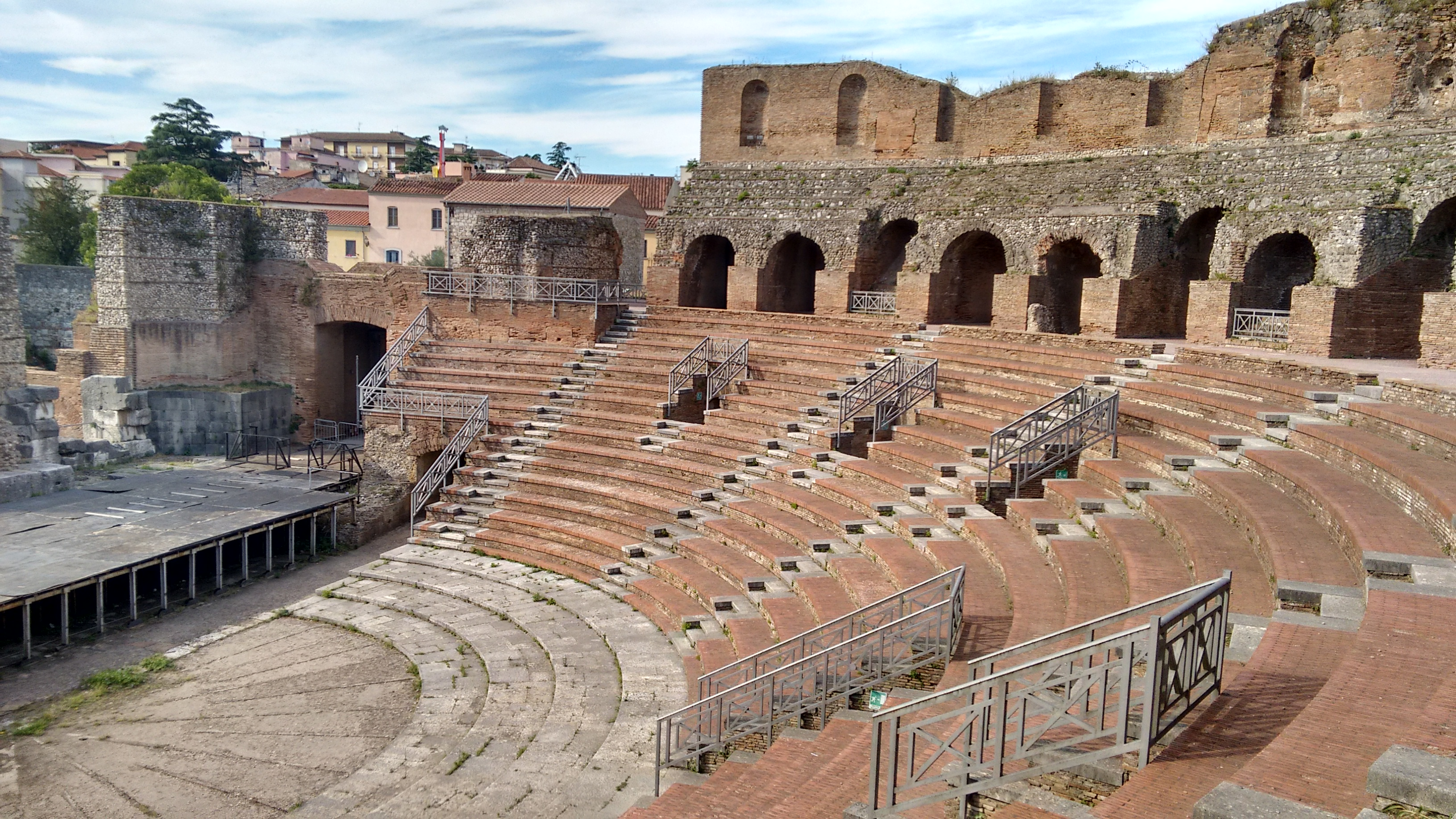
Roman theatre of Benevento

Western theatre developed and expanded considerably under the Romans. The Roman historian Livy wrote that the Romans first experienced theatre in the 4th century BC, with a performance by Etruscan actors. Beacham argues that Romans had been familiar with "pre-theatrical practices" for some time before that recorded contact. The theatre of ancient Rome was a thriving and diverse art form, ranging from festival performances of street theatre, nude dancing, and acrobatics, to the staging of Plautus's broadly appealing situation comedies, to the high-style, verbally elaborate tragedies of Seneca. Although Rome had a native tradition of performance, the Hellenization of Roman culture in the 3rd century BC had a profound and energizing effect on Roman theatre and encouraged the development of Latin literature of the highest quality for the stage.

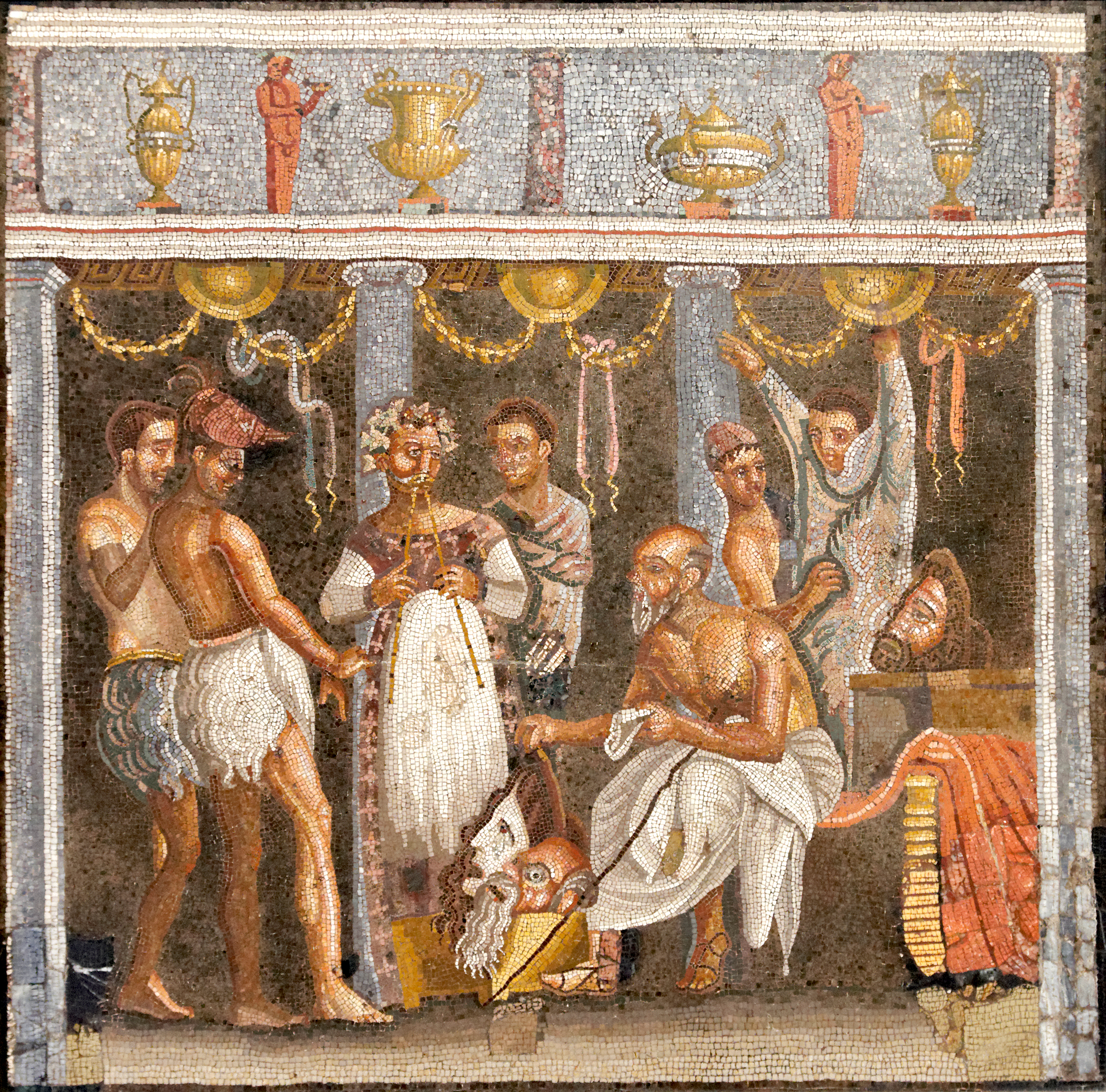
Roman mosaic depicting actors and an aulos player (House of the Tragic Poet, Pompeii).

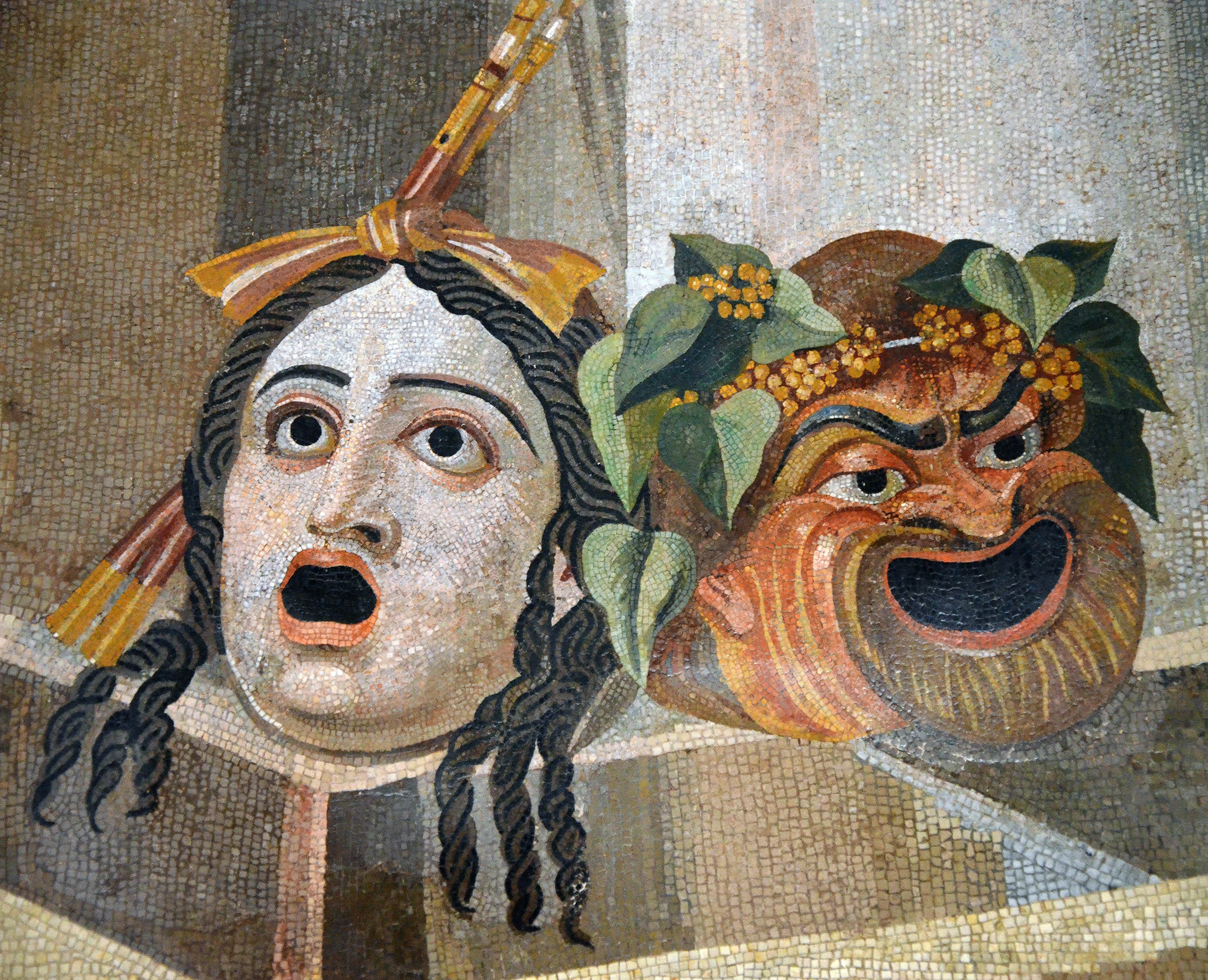
Theatrical masks of Tragedy and Comedy, Roman mosaic, 2nd century AD, Capitoline Museums, Rome

Following the expansion of the Roman Republic (509–27 BC) into several Greek territories between 270 and 240 BC, Rome encountered Greek drama. From the later years of the republic and by means of the Roman Empire (27 BC-476 AD), theatre spread west across Europe, around the Mediterranean and reached England; Roman theatre was more varied, extensive and sophisticated than that of any culture before it. While Greek drama continued to be performed throughout the Roman period, the year 240 BC marks the beginning of regular Roman drama. (Note: For more information on the ancient Roman dramatists, see the articles categorised under "Ancient Roman dramatists and playwrights" in Wikipedia.) From the beginning of the empire, however, interest in full-length drama declined in favour of a broader variety of theatrical entertainments.

The first important works of Roman literature were the tragedies and comedies that Livius Andronicus wrote from 240 BC. Five years later, Gnaeus Naevius also began to write drama. No plays from either writer have survived. While both dramatists composed in both genres, Andronicus was most appreciated for his tragedies and Naevius for his comedies; their successors tended to specialise in one or the other, which led to a separation of the subsequent development of each type of drama. By the beginning of the 2nd century BC, drama was firmly established in Rome and a guild of writers (collegium poetarum) had been formed.

The Roman comedies that have survived are all fabula palliata (comedies based on Greek subjects) and come from two dramatists: Titus Maccius Plautus (Plautus) and Publius Terentius Afer (Terence). In re-working the Greek originals, the Roman comic dramatists abolished the role of the chorus in dividing the drama into episodes and introduced musical accompaniment to its dialogue (between one-third of the dialogue in the comedies of Plautus and two-thirds in those of Terence). The action of all scenes is set in the exterior location of a street and its complications often follow from eavesdropping. Plautus, the more popular of the two, wrote between 205 and 184 BC and twenty of his comedies survive, of which his farces are best known; he was admired for the wit of his dialogue and his use of a variety of poetic meters. All of the six comedies that Terence wrote between 166 and 160 BC have survived; the complexity of his plots, in which he often combined several Greek originals, was sometimes denounced, but his double-plots enabled a sophisticated presentation of contrasting human behaviour.

No early Roman tragedy survives, though it was highly regarded in its day; historians know of three early tragedians—Quintus Ennius, Marcus Pacuvius and Lucius Accius. From the time of the empire, the work of two tragedians survives—one is an unknown author, while the other is the Stoic philosopher Seneca. Nine of Seneca's tragedies survive, all of which are fabula crepidata (tragedies adapted from Greek originals); his Phaedra, for example, was based on Euripides' Hippolytus. Historians do not know who wrote the only extant example of the fabula praetexta (tragedies based on Roman subjects), Octavia, but in former times it was mistakenly attributed to Seneca due to his appearance as a character in the tragedy.

In contrast to Ancient Greek theatre, the theatre in Ancient Rome did allow female performers. While the majority were employed for dancing and singing, a minority of actresses are known to have performed speaking roles, and there were actresses who achieved wealth, fame and recognition for their art, such as Eucharis, Dionysia, Galeria Copiola and Fabia Arete: they also formed their own acting guild, the Sociae Mimae, which was evidently quite wealthy.

=== Transition and early medieval theatre, 500–1050 ===
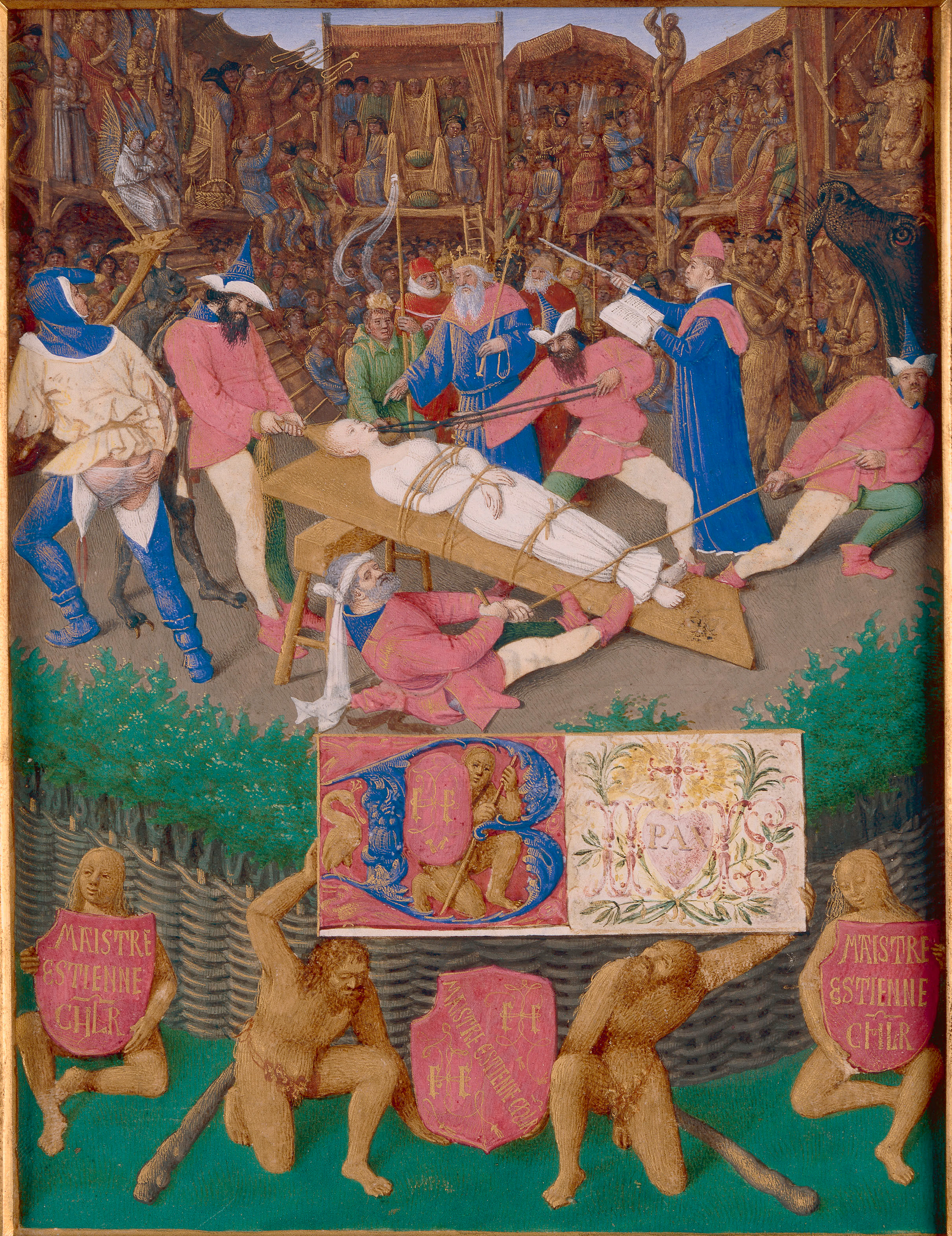
Jean Fouquet, The Martyrdom of Saint Apollonia

As the Western Roman Empire fell into decay through the 4th and 5th centuries, the seat of Roman power shifted to Constantinople and the Eastern Roman Empire, today called the Byzantine Empire. While surviving evidence about Byzantine theatre is slight, existing records show that miming, scenes or recitations from tragedies and comedies, dances, and other entertainments were very popular. Constantinople had two theatres that were in use as late as the 5th century. However, the true importance of the Byzantines in theatrical history is their preservation of many classical Greek texts and the compilation of a massive encyclopedia called the Suda, from which is derived a large amount of contemporary information on Greek theatre.

The origins of Italian theatre are a source of debate among scholars, as they are not yet clear and traceable with certain sources. Since the end of the theatre of ancient Rome, which partly coincided with the fall of the Western Roman Empire, mimes and comedies were still performed. Alongside this pagan form of representation, mostly performed by tropes and wandering actors of which there are no direct written sources, the theatre was reborn, in medieval times, from religious functions and from the dramatization of some tropes of which the most famous and ancient is the short Quem quaeritis? from the 10th century, still in Latin.

It can therefore be assumed that there were two main lines on which the ancient Italian theatre developed. The first, consisting of the dramatization of Catholic liturgies and of which more documentation is retained, and the second, formed by pagan forms of spectacle such as the staging for city festivals, (Note: Festivities that are still pagan, such as the grape harvest, and mostly take place in small towns.) the court preparations of the jesters and the songs of the troubadours. (Note: Of this second root Dario Fo he speaks of a true alternative culture to the official one: although widespread as an idea, some scholars such as Giovanni Antonucci do not agree in considering it as such. In this regard, see Antonucci, Giovanni (1995). Storia del teatro italiano (in Italian). Newton Compton Editori. pp. 10–14. ISBN 978-8838241604.)

From the 5th century, Western Europe was plunged into a period of general disorder that lasted (with a brief period of stability under the Carolingian Empire in the 9th century) until the 10th century. While it seems that small nomadic bands travelled around Europe throughout the period, performing wherever they could find an audience, there is no evidence that they produced anything but crude scenes. These performers were denounced by the Church, as they were viewed as dangerous and pagan.

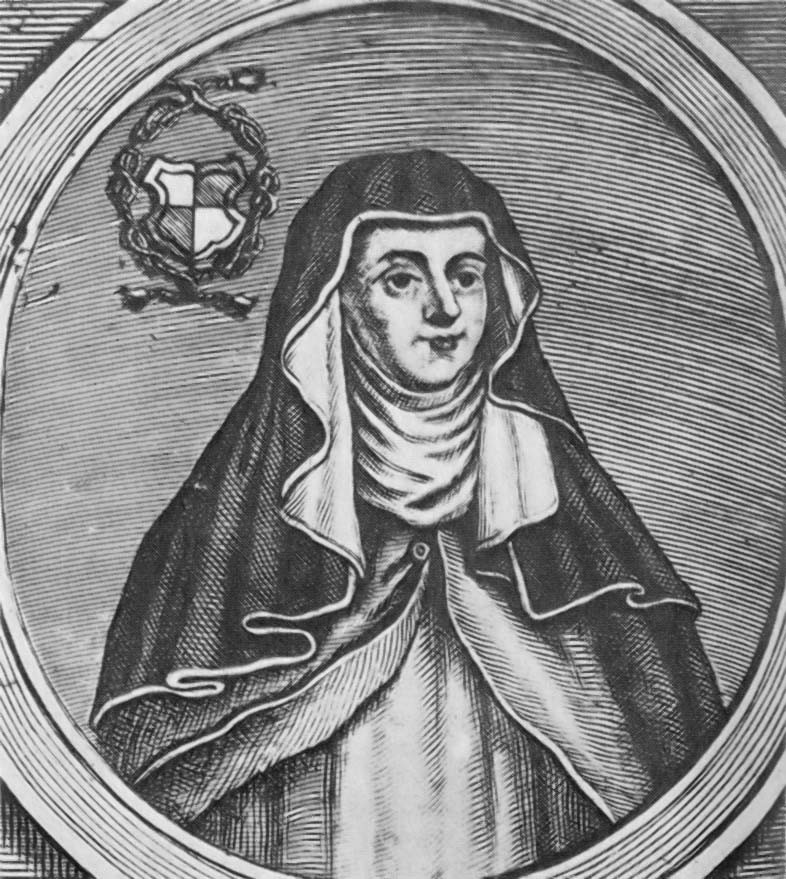
Hrosvitha of Gandersheim, the first dramatist of the post-classical era.

By the Early Middle Ages, churches in Europe began staging dramatized versions of particular biblical events on specific days of the year. These dramatizations were included in order to vivify annual celebrations. Symbolic objects and actions – vestments, altars, censers, and pantomime performed by priests – recalled the events which Christian ritual celebrates. These were extensive sets of visual signs that could be used to communicate with a largely illiterate audience. These performances developed into liturgical dramas, the earliest of which is the Whom do you Seek (Quem-Quaeritis) Easter trope, dating from ca. 925. Liturgical drama was sung responsively by two groups and did not involve actors impersonating characters. However, sometime between 965 and 975, Æthelwold of Winchester composed the Regularis Concordia (Monastic Agreement) which contains a playlet complete with directions for performance.

Hrosvitha (c. 935 – 973), a canoness in northern Germany, wrote six plays modeled on Terence's comedies but using religious subjects. These six plays – Abraham, Callimachus, Dulcitius, Gallicanus, Paphnutius, and Sapientia – are the first known plays composed by a female dramatist and the first identifiable Western dramatic works of the post-classical era. They were first published in 1501 and had considerable influence on religious and didactic plays of the sixteenth century. Hrosvitha was followed by Hildegard of Bingen (d. 1179), a Benedictine abbess, who wrote a Latin musical drama called Ordo Virtutum in 1155.

=== High and late medieval theatre, 1050–1500 ===
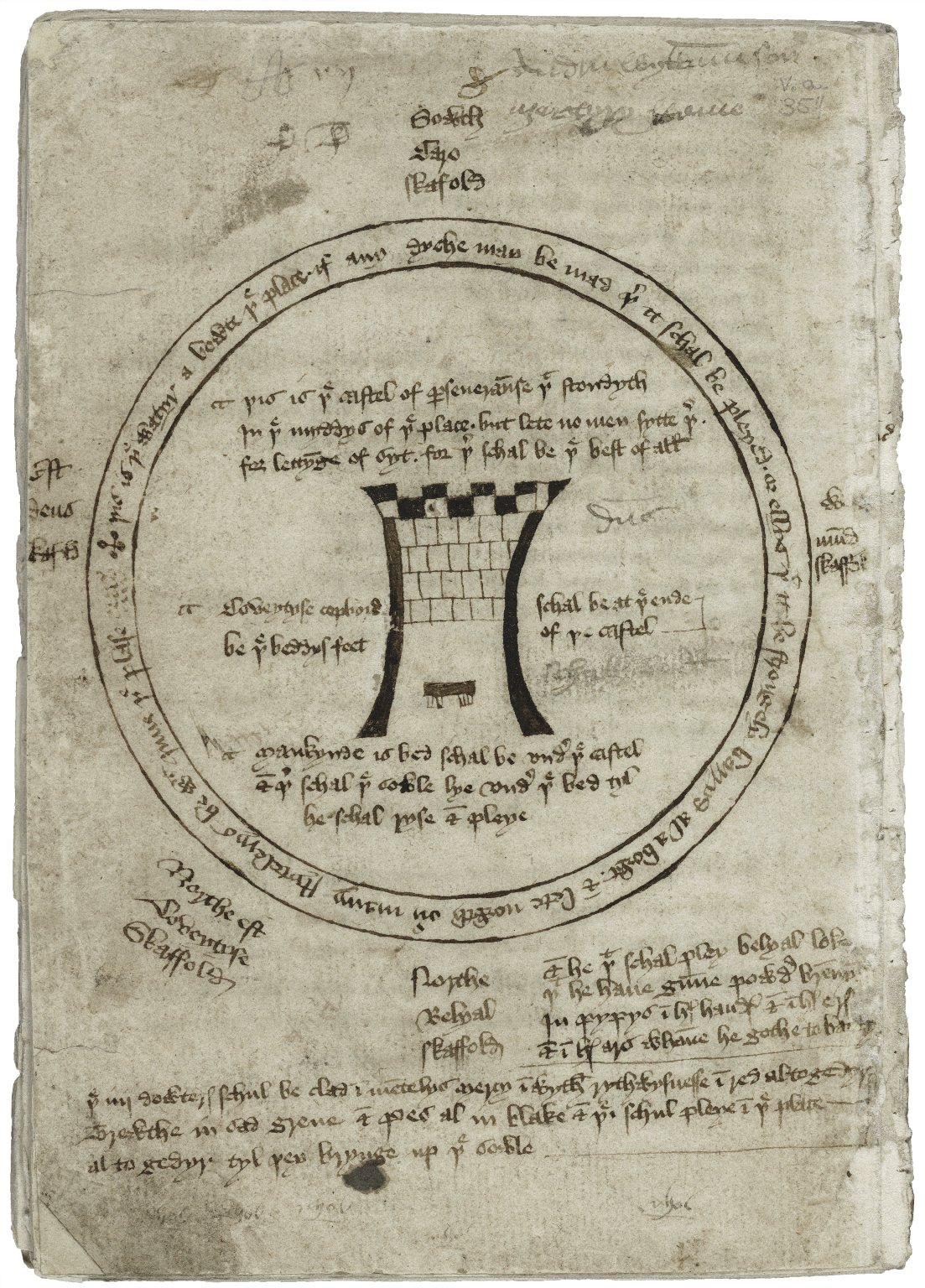
Stage drawing from 15th-century vernacular morality play The Castle of Perseverance (as found in the Macro Manuscript).

As the Viking invasions ceased in the middle of the 11th century, liturgical drama had spread from Russia to Scandinavia to Italy. Only in Muslim-occupied Iberian Peninsula were liturgical dramas not presented at all. Despite the large number of liturgical dramas that have survived from the period, many churches would have only performed one or two per year and a larger number never performed any at all.

The Feast of Fools was especially important in the development of comedy. The festival inverted the status of the lesser clergy and allowed them to ridicule their superiors and the routine of church life. Sometimes plays were staged as part of the occasion and a certain amount of burlesque and comedy crept into these performances. Although comic episodes had to truly wait until the separation of drama from the liturgy, the Feast of Fools undoubtedly had a profound effect on the development of comedy in both religious and secular plays.

Performance of religious plays outside of the church began sometime in the 12th century through a traditionally accepted process of merging shorter liturgical dramas into longer plays which were then translated into vernacular and performed by laymen. The Mystery of Adam (1150) gives credence to this theory as its detailed stage direction suggest that it was staged outdoors. A number of other plays from the period survive, including La Seinte Resurrection (Norman), The Play of the Magi Kings (Spanish), and Sponsus (French).

The importance of the High Middle Ages in the development of theatre was the economic and political changes that led to the formation of guilds and the growth of towns. This would lead to significant changes in the Late Middle Ages. In the British Isles, plays were produced in some 127 different towns during the Middle Ages. These vernacular Mystery plays were written in cycles of a large number of plays: York (48 plays), Chester (24), Wakefield (32) and Unknown (42). A larger number of plays survive from France and Germany in this period and some type of religious dramas were performed in nearly every European country in the Late Middle Ages. Many of these plays contained comedy, devils, villains and clowns.

The theatre historian therefore based his research method, in the field of the origins of Italian theatre, not only on the actual study of his own subject but also combining it with ethnological and anthropological study as well as that of religious studies in a broad sense. (Note: Among the first to adopt an attitude of transversal analysis in the study of the theatre is Mario Apollonio, a theatrical historian to with a different approach from the school of Benedetto Croce, who saw in the theatre the supremacy of written word and in its effect on the spectator an interest sociological. Apollonius focuses on the spoken and acted word, thus including in the analysis of the theatrical phenomenon a completely different meaning: interdisciplinary, which also had to grasp the weapons necessary to face and understand the subject in other fields of study.)

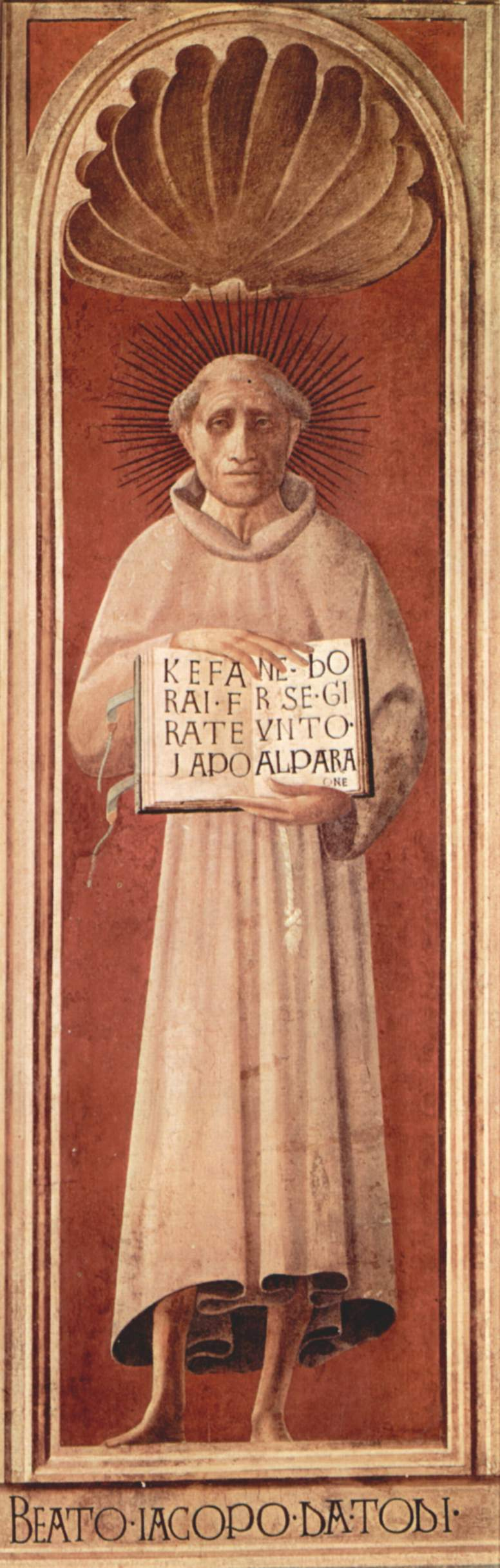
Jacopone da Todi in a fresco by Paolo Uccello in the cathedral of Prato

The Catholic Church, which found in the dramatization of the liturgies a more than favorable welcome from the masses, as demonstrated by the development of theatrical practice on major holidays, paradoxically had a contradictory behavior towards them: if on the one hand it allowed and encouraged their diffusion, however he always deprecated its practice, because it was misleading from the principles of Catholicism. (Note: Some historians also point out that the Church needed to impose itself as the religion of the Empire, repressing paganism and the forms of cultural expression that derived from it: among these, theatrical practice. See Attisani, Antonio (1989). Breve storia del teatro (in Italian). BCM. p. 60.) The pagan spectacles suffered the same fate, where the judgments and measures taken by the religious were much harsher: still in 1215, a Constitution of the Lateran Council forbade clerics (among other things) to have contact with histrions and jugglers. The strong contrast of religious authority to theatrical practice decreed a series of circumstances that differentiate medieval theatre (which still cannot be defined as "Italian" in the strict sense) from that known from Humanism onwards, much closer to the modern concept of theatrical representation. For over ten centuries there was never the construction of a theatrical building, unlike what happened in ancient Greece and imperial Rome.

Despite the numerous restrictions, the vernacular dramaturgy develops due to the trouvères and jesters, who sing, lute in hand, the most disparate topics: from love driven towards women to mockery towards the powerful. There is evidence in the Laurentian Rhythm of 1157 and in other more or less contemporary rhythms such as the Rhythm of Sant'Alessio, of the dramatization in verse by anonymous people in the vernacular, although the metric is still indebted to the Latin versification. More famous is the XIII century Rosa fresca aulentissima, by Cielo d'Alcamo, a real jester mime destined for stage representation, which does not spare double entenders and overly licentious jokes towards the fair sex in verses.

Even more articulated were the texts of Ruggieri Apuliese, a jester of the 13th century of which there is little or no news, mostly discordant, but in which a sardonic ability can be traced to parody and dramatize the events, enclosed in his gab and serventesi. During the 13th century, however, the jester prose in the vernacular suffered a setback due to the marginalization of the events to which it was linked: representations in Curta, street performances, and more of which the chronicle does not remember.

The lauda dramatica flourished in the same period, which later evolved into the sacred representation: (Note: Here too the opinions differ: if some (such as Giovanni Antonucci) see in the sacred representation an evolution of the Umbrian-Abruzzese lauda dramatica, others (see the works and studies of Paola Ventrone) recognize original outcomes and diversified experiences.) the lauda, derived from the popular ballad, was made up of stanzas represented first in verse, then in the form of dialogue. An example of transformation into a dialogic drama is a result of Donna de Paradiso by Jacopone da Todi, where the dialogue between John the Baptist, the Mary and Jesus is articulated on a religious topic: in it there is a fine linguistic and lexical intervention (the subdued language of the Mary and Christ compared to that of the John the Baptist) and a skilful capacity for dramatizing the event. It should be emphasized that this type of religious theatricality did not properly spread within the Church, but developed above all in Umbria following a serious plague that decimated the country, due to the Flagellant, congregations of faithful used to self-flagellation, which by virtue of their religious acts they well combined the processions of repentance with accompaniment with dramatic laudi. If they found representation in Orvieto, as in other Umbrian centers (remember the famous Corporal of Bolsena), another important epicenter of laude productions was L'Aquila, where the articulation of the same was such as to require three days for a complete representation (as in the case of the anonymous Leggenna de Sancto Tomascio).

The majority of actors in these plays were drawn from the local population. For example, at Valenciennes in 1547, more than 100 roles were assigned to 72 actors. Plays were staged on pageant wagon stages, which were platforms mounted on wheels used to move scenery. Often providing their own costumes, amateur performers in England were exclusively male, but other countries had female performers. The platform stage, which was an unidentified space and not a specific locale, allowed for abrupt changes in location.

A separate chapter with respect to religious representation consists of those productions in Latin verse known as elegiac comedies (medieval Latin comedies). It is a set of Medieval Latin texts, mainly composed of the metric form of the elegiac couplet and characterized, almost always, by the alternation of dialogues and narrated parts and by comic and licentious contents.

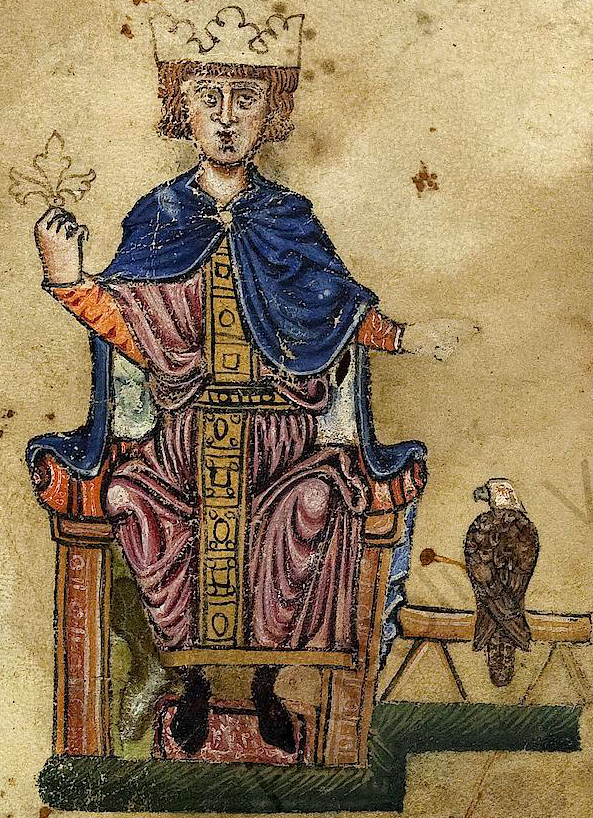
Frederick II, Holy Roman Emperor

The flowering of the genus is mainly inscribed within the European season of the so-called rebirth of the 12th century and is affected by the ferment of that cultural climate that the philologist Ludwig Traube called Aetas Ovidiana. as a whole, it was a phenomenon that certainly cannot be affirmed as Italian: on the contrary, Italy was just touched by this phenomenon, in a later period, the thirteenth century: all Italian productions refer to the environment of the court and chancellery of Frederick II, Holy Roman Emperor (the singular De Paulino et Polla by Riccardo da Venosa, and the De uxore cerdonis, attributed to Jacopo da Benevento).

However, their genuine theatrical nature is not clear: it is not known, for example, if they were mere rhetorical products or rather works intended for a real staging (in this case, acting with a single voice is considered more likely); not even one is able to appreciate the influence on the rise of medieval theatre in the vernacular, even if some comic elements have passed to the theatre. The small flowering of this genus enjoyed considerable success; its importance in literary history is noteworthy, due to its influence on subsequent authors in vulgar languages, in particular on medieval fabliaulistics and novellistics of which they anticipate themes and tones, and on humanistic comedy of the fifteenth century.

Throughout the Middle Ages no theatrical building was ever built, so that it is impossible to speak of theatrical architecture. Regarding the scenography, it can be completely placed on the level of sacred representations, since jesters and buffoons, troubadours and singers did not use support elements that could help the spectator in the figuration of the story narrated. The almost nil iconographic support that has come makes a faithful reconstruction difficult, but preserved lists of the Brotherhood "stuff" testify to a wealth of furnishings not comparable to the modern conception of theatre, but still of a certain thickness: the list of the Perugian brotherhood of Saint Dominic, which is very well known, includes shirts, gloves, cassocks, wigs and masks.

The representations, which came out of the church in search of larger places of reception and where there was the possibility of using scenic artists certainly not welcome within consecrated walls, found a place in the churchyards first, in the squares and then even in the streets of the city, both in the form of a procession that does not. The pictorial support, which was necessary for a more complete recognition of the place represented and narrated, also became very important, although no names of artists who worked for their realization have come down to us. It must be borne in mind that there is no figure of set-up or set designer, so such works necessarily had to submit to the requests of the brotherhoods, and almost certainly carried out by untrained artists or of little fame given that the possible gain was little.

Morality plays emerged as a distinct dramatic form around 1400 and flourished until 1550. A morality play is The Castle of Perseverance which depicts mankind's progress from birth to death. However, the most famous morality play and perhaps best known medieval drama is Everyman. Everyman receives Death's summons, struggles to escape and finally resigns himself to necessity. Along the way, he is deserted by Kindred, Goods, and Fellowship – only Good Deeds goes with him to the grave.

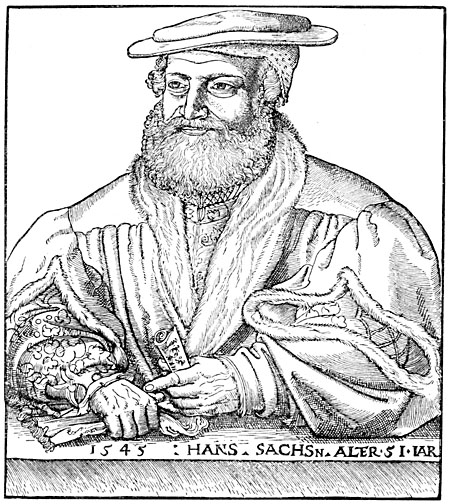
Hans Sachs, wood engraving by Michael Ostendorfer

There were also a number of secular performances staged in the Middle Ages, the earliest of which is The Play of the Greenwood by Adam de la Halle in 1276. It contains satirical scenes and folk material such as faeries and other supernatural occurrences. Farces also rose dramatically in popularity after the 13th century. The majority of these plays come from France and Germany and are similar in tone and form, emphasizing sex and bodily excretions. The best known playwright of farces is Hans Sachs (1494–1576) who wrote 198 dramatic works. In England, The Second Shepherds' Play of the Wakefield Cycle is the best known early farce. However, farce did not appear independently in England until the 16th century with the work of John Heywood (1497–1580).

A significant forerunner of the development of Elizabethan drama was the Chambers of Rhetoric in the Low Countries. These societies were concerned with poetry, music and drama and held contests to see which society could compose the best drama in relation to a question posed.

At the end of the Late Middle Ages, professional actors began to appear in England and Europe. Richard III and Henry VII both maintained small companies of professional actors. Their plays were performed in the Great Hall of a nobleman's residence, often with a raised platform at one end for the audience and a "screen" at the other for the actors. Also important were Mummers' plays, performed during the Christmas season, and court masques. These masques were especially popular during the reign of Henry VIII who had a House of Revels built and an Office of Revels established in 1545.

The end of medieval drama came about due to a number of factors, including the weakening power of the Catholic Church, the Protestant Reformation and the banning of religious plays in many countries. Elizabeth I forbid all religious plays in 1558 and the great cycle plays had been silenced by the 1580s. Similarly, religious plays were banned in the Netherlands in 1539, the Papal States in 1547 and in Paris in 1548. The abandonment of these plays destroyed the international theatre that had thereto existed and forced each country to develop its own form of drama. It also allowed dramatists to turn to secular subjects and the reviving interest in Greek and Roman theatre provided them with the perfect opportunity.

=== Humanism ===
The age of Humanism, between the 14th and 15th centuries, knows the genesis and the flowering of the so-called humanistic comedy, a phenomenon that can be considered entirely Italian. Like the elegiac comedies, these are texts in Latin, also of a licentious and paradoxical subject. Beyond the consonance of common themes (perhaps also due to their nature as literary topoi), the relationship between the two genres is not clear: certainly, humanistic comedies are more effective in updating certain themes, with a transposition on a high floor, in order to show them in their exemplary nature and use them as allusions to contemporary situations. Unlike the elegiac comedy, it is known with certainty that the humanistic comedies were intended for staging. The fruition took place in the same high-cultural and university-goliardic environment in which they were produced. In fact, as has been stated, the "linguistic-expressive operation that was the basis of these comic works [...] could only be received and appreciated in high-level cultural contexts, but also sensitive to a comedy of a goliardic matrix : university circles thus represented the natural pool of readers and spectators of humanistic theatrical writings".

The importance of the humanistic comedy lies in the fact that it marks the genesis of the "profane drama", the result not of a cultural process from below, but of an invention from above, carried out by a cultured and participating urban bourgeoisie, able to grasp and elaborate the ferments of an era of great transformation and renewal. Thus the foundations were laid for a process of liberation of the theatre from the religious forms of representation and from the Catholic Church, an emancipation that would then be accomplished, definitively and in a short time, without friction or conflict with the papal curia, with the Italian-language comedies of the Renaissance theatre.

=== Italian Commedia dell'arte ===
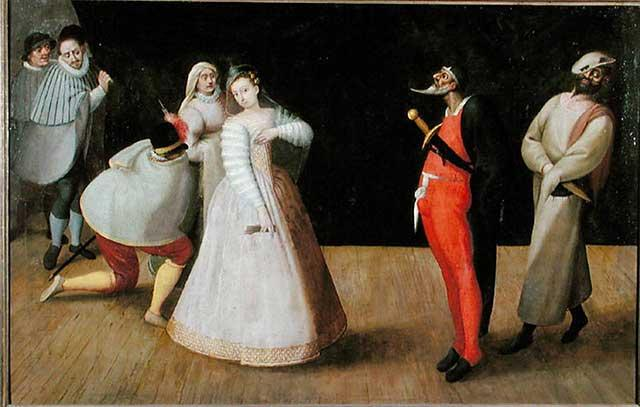
Commedia dell'arte troupe I Gelosi performing, by Hieronymus Francken I, c. 1590

Commedia dell'arte (lit. 'comedy of the profession') was an early form of professional theatre, originating from Italian theatre, that was popular throughout Europe between the 16th and 18th centuries. It was formerly called "Italian comedy" in English and is also known as commedia alla maschera, commedia improvviso, and commedia dell'arte all'improvviso. Characterized by masked "types", commedia was responsible for the rise of actresses such as Isabella Andreini and improvised performances based on sketches or scenarios. A commedia, such as The Tooth Puller, is both scripted and improvised. Characters' entrances and exits are scripted. A special characteristic of commedia is the lazzo, a joke or "something foolish or witty", usually well known to the performers and to some extent a scripted routine. Another characteristic of commedia is pantomime, which is mostly used by the character Arlecchino, now better known as Harlequin.

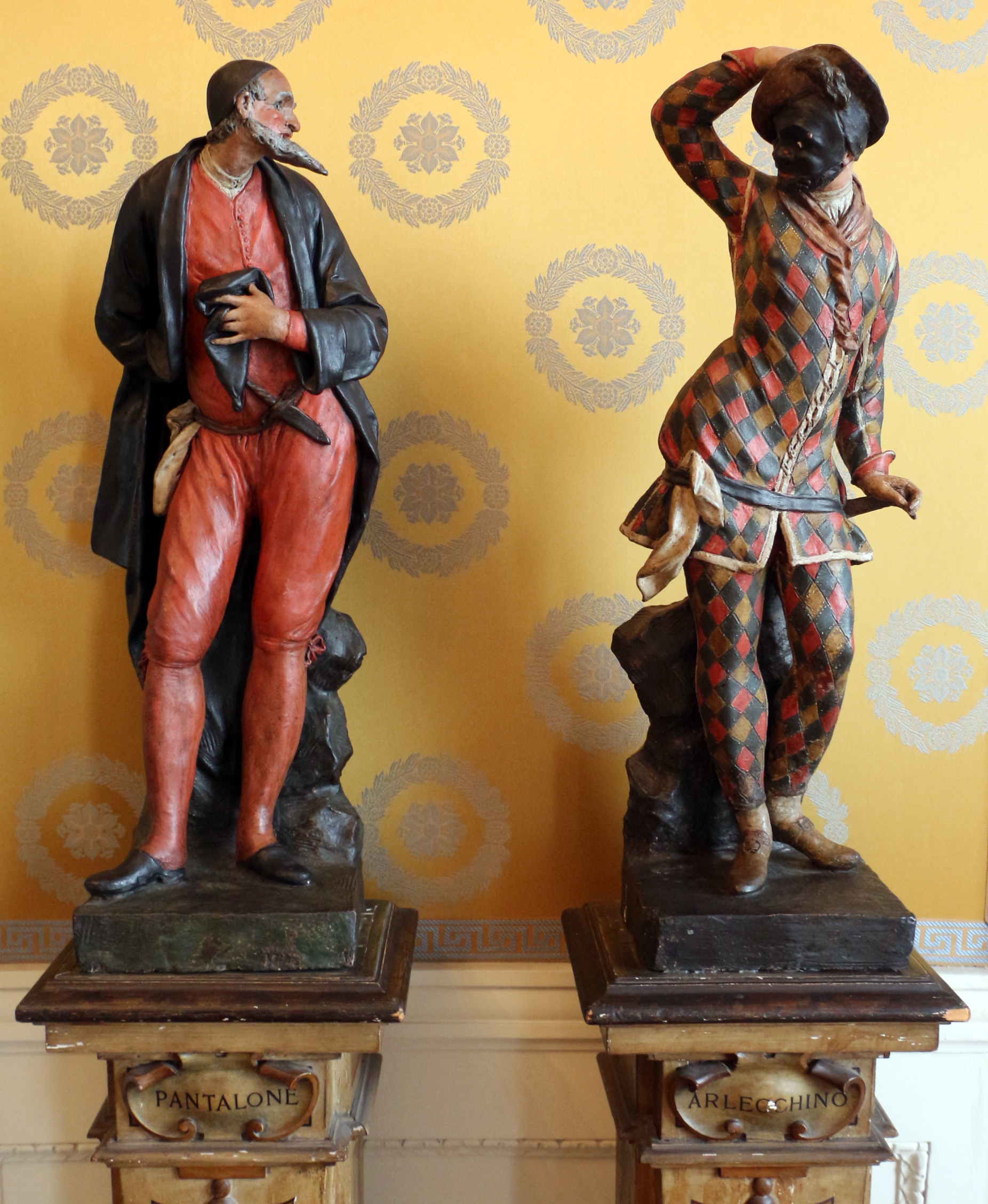
Statues of Pantalone and Harlequin, two stock characters from the Commedia dell'arte, in the Museo Teatrale alla Scala, Milan, Italy

The characters of the commedia usually represent fixed social types and stock characters, such as foolish old men, devious servants, or military officers full of false bravado. The characters are exaggerated "real characters", such as a know-it-all doctor called Il Dottore, a greedy old man called Pantalone, or a perfect relationship like the Innamorati. Many troupes were formed to perform commedia, including I Gelosi (which had actors such as Andreini and her husband Francesco Andreini), Confidenti Troupe, Desioi Troupe, and Fedeli Troupe. Commedia was often performed outside on platforms or in popular areas such as a piazza (town square). The form of theatre originated in Italy, but travelled throughout Europe - sometimes to as far away as Moscow.

The genesis of commedia may be related to carnival in Venice, where the author and actor Andrea Calmo had created the character Il Magnifico, the precursor to the vecchio (old man) Pantalone, by 1570. In the Flaminio Scala scenario, for example, Il Magnifico persists and is interchangeable with Pantalone into the 17th century. While Calmo's characters (which also included the Spanish Capitano and a dottore type) were not masked, it is uncertain at what point the characters donned the mask. However, the connection to carnival (the period between Epiphany and Ash Wednesday) would suggest that masking was a convention of carnival and was applied at some point. The tradition in Northern Italy is centred in Florence, Mantua, and Venice, where the major companies came under the protection of the various dukes. Concomitantly, a Neapolitan tradition emerged in the south and featured the prominent stage figure Pulcinella, which has been long associated with Naples and derived into various types elsewhere—most famously as the puppet character Punch (of the eponymous Punch and Judy shows) in England.

The Commedia dell'arte allowed professional women to perform early on: Lucrezia Di Siena, whose name is on a contract of actors from 1564, has been referred to as the first Italian actress known by name, with Vincenza Armani and Barbara Flaminia as the first primadonna and the well-documented actresses in Europe.

=== English Elizabethan theatre ===
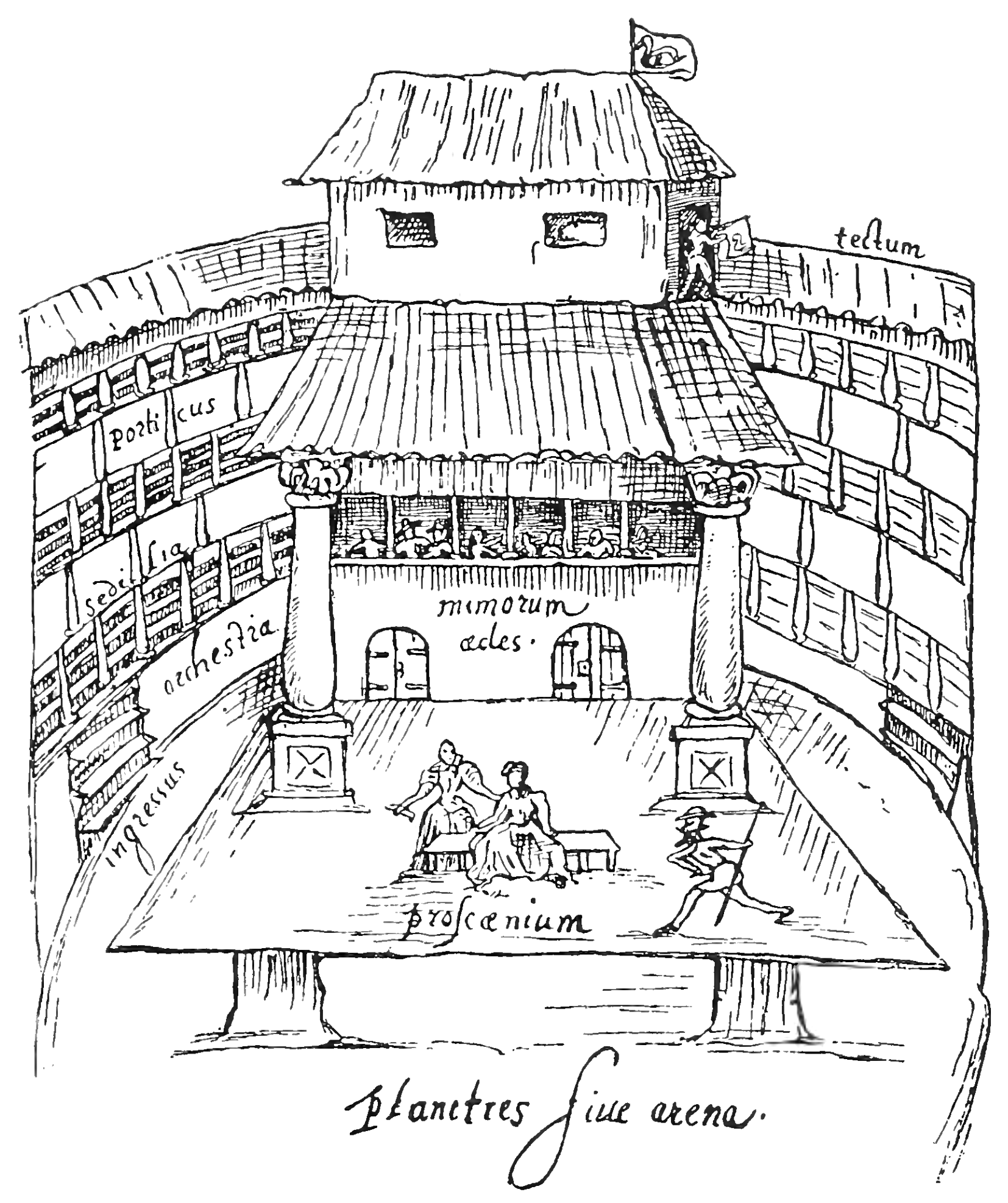
A 1596 sketch of a performance in progress on the thrust stage of The Swan, a typical Elizabethan open-roof playhouse.

English Renaissance theatre derived from several medieval theatre traditions, such as, the mystery plays that formed a part of religious festivals in England and other parts of Europe during the Middle Ages. Other sources include the "morality plays" and the "University drama" that attempted to recreate Athenian tragedy. The Italian tradition of Commedia dell'arte, as well as the elaborate masques frequently presented at court, also contributed to the shaping of public theatre.

Since before the reign of Elizabeth I, companies of players were attached to households of leading aristocrats and performed secular pieces seasonally in various locations. These became the foundation for the professional players that performed on the Elizabethan stage. The tours of these players gradually replaced the performances of the mystery and morality plays by local players. A 1572 law eliminated any unlicensed companies lacking formal patronage by labelling them vagabonds.

The City of London authorities were generally hostile to public performances, but its hostility was overmatched by the Queen's taste for plays and the Privy Council's support. Theatres sprang up in suburbs, especially in the liberty of Southwark, accessible across the Thames to city dwellers but beyond the authorities' control. The companies maintained the pretence that their public performances were mere rehearsals for the frequent performances before the Queen, but while the latter did grant prestige, the former were the real source of the income for the professional players.

Along with the economics of the profession, the character of the drama changed toward the end of the period. Under Elizabeth, the drama was a unified expression as far as social class was concerned: the Court watched the same plays the commoners saw in the public playhouses. With the development of the private theatres, drama became more oriented toward the tastes and values of an upper-class audience. By the later part of the reign of Charles I, few new plays were being written for the public theatres, which sustained themselves on the accumulated works of the previous decades.

Puritan opposition to the stage (informed by the arguments of the early Church Fathers who had written screeds against the decadent and violent entertainments of the Romans) argued not only that the stage in general was pagan, but that any play that represented a religious figure was inherently idolatrous. In 1642, at the outbreak of the English Civil War, the Puritan authorities banned the performance of all plays within the city limits of London. A sweeping assault against the alleged immoralities of the theatre crushed whatever remained in England of the dramatic tradition.

=== Italian Renaissance theatre ===
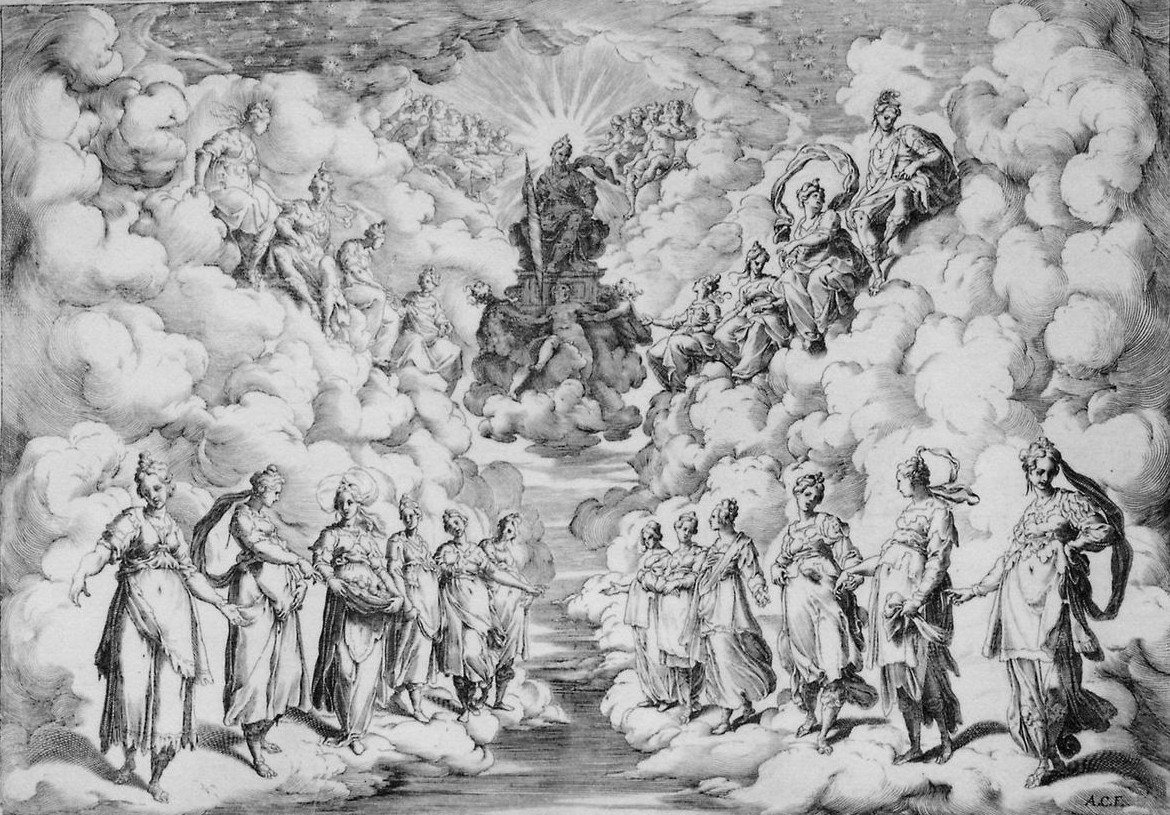
First intermedio of the play The Pilgrim Woman

The Renaissance theatre marked the beginning of the modern theatre due to the rediscovery and study of the classics, the ancient theatrical texts were recovered and translated, which were soon staged at the court and in the curtensi halls, and then moved to real theatre. In this way the idea of theatre came close to that of today: a performance in a designated place in which the public participates.

In the late 15th century two cities were important centers for the rediscovery and renewal of theatrical art: Ferrara and Rome. The first, vital center of art in the second half of the fifteenth century, saw the staging of some of the most famous Latin works by Plautus, rigorously translated into Italian. On 5 March 1508 the first comedy in Italian was performed at the court of Ferrara, La Cassaria by Ludovico Ariosto, indebted to the Terenzian model of comedy. The popes, however, saw a political instrument in the theatre: after years of opposition, the papacy finally endorsed the art of theatre, first under the spur of Pope Sixtus IV who, due to the Roman Academy of Julius Pomponius Laetus, saw the remaking of many comedies. Latinas; subsequently the contribution of Pope Alexander VI, lover of representations, allowed the diffusion of the same to many celebrations, including weddings and parties.

Another important center of the revival of modern theatre was Florence, where a classic comedy, the Andria by Terence, was staged first in 1476. The Tuscan capital stood out in the 15th century for the enormous development of the Sacred representation, but soon a group of poets, starting with Agnolo Poliziano, gave their contribution to the spread of Renaissance comedy.

A figure in its own right is that of Angelo Beolco known as Il Ruzante, author of comedies in the Venetian language, actor and director supported by the patron Luigi Cornaro: although the linguistic peculiarity allowed little to spread it in the Italian context, alternating periods of celebrity and forgetfulness of the author over the centuries, he represents an example of the use of theatre as a representation of contemporary society, very often seen from the side of the countryside. Venice, in which a scenario of varied theatrical activities was operating, developed the diffusion of this art late by virtue of an amendment of 1508 by the Council of Ten, which prohibited theatrical activity. The edict was never slavishly observed, and due to these infractions the mariazo, the eclogue, the pastoral comedy, the erudite or cultured comedy developed. Venice also saw the birth of an anonymous comedy, La Venexiana, very far from the canons of erudite comedy, which reflects a licentious and brilliant as well as desecrating cross-section of the libertine aristocracy of the Serenissima. An author in his own right, also full of creative originality and tending towards the bizarre, is Andrea Calmo, a poet with six works, and who enjoyed a certain fame in his native Venice.

At the turn of the 15th and 16th centuries, Rome became the center of a series of studies on theatrical art that allowed the development of the perspective scene and scenographic experimentation, due to the studies of Baldassare Peruzzi, painter and set designer.

=== Counter-Reformation theatre ===
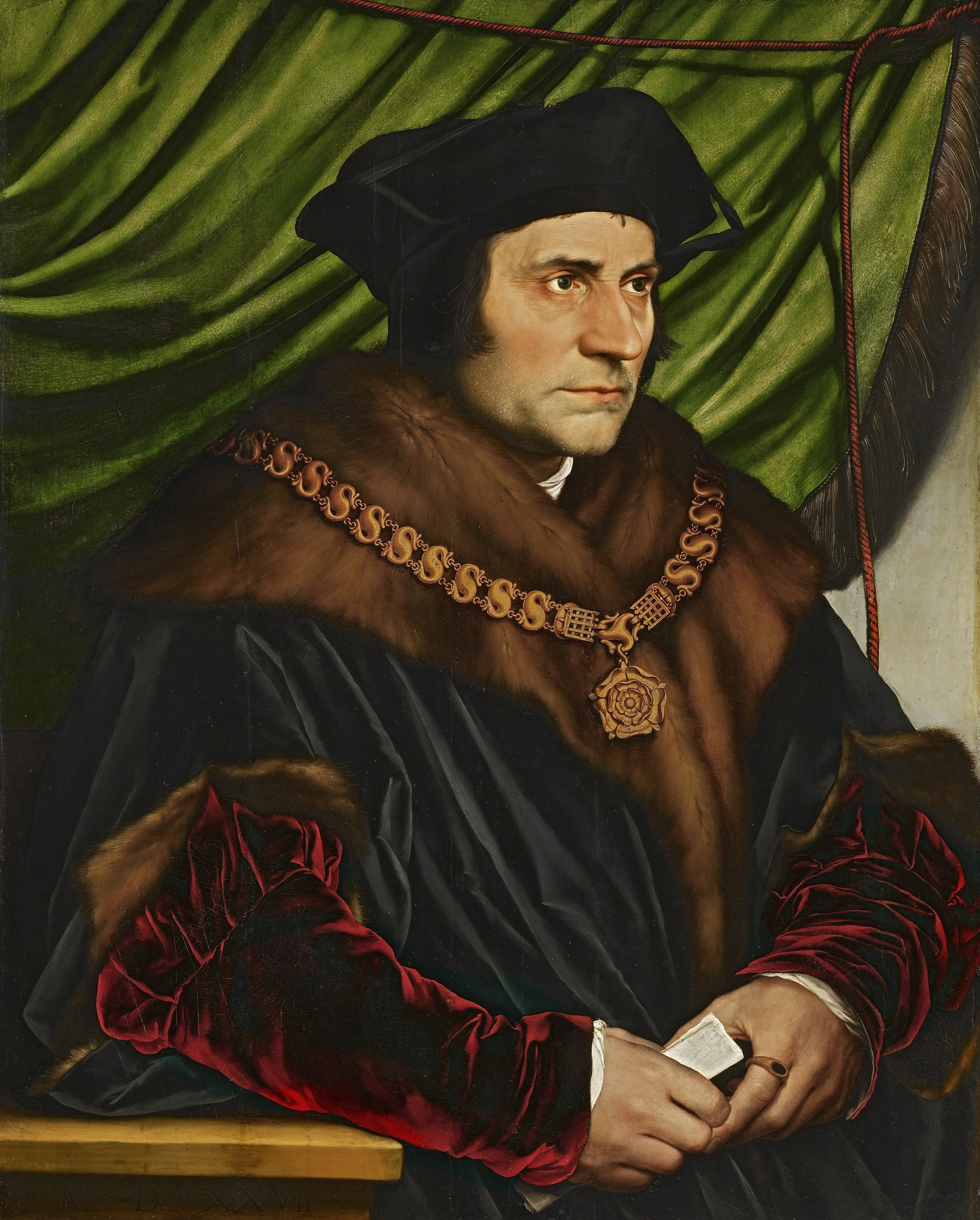
Thomas More

If Protestantism was characterized by an ambivalent relationship to theatricality, Counter-Reformation Catholicism was to use it for explicitly affective and evangelical purposes. The decorative innovations of baroque Catholic churches evolved symbiotically with the increasingly sophisticated art of scenography. Medieval theatrical traditions could be retained and developed in Catholic countries, wherever they were thought to be edifying. Sacre rappresentazioni in Italy, and Corpus Christi celebrations across Europe, are examples of this. Autos sacramentales, the one-act plays at the centre of Corpus Christi celebrations in Spain, gave concrete and triumphal realization to the abstractions of Catholic eucharistic theology, most famously in the hands of Pedro Calderón de la Barca. While the emphasis on predestination in Protestant theology had brought about a new appreciation of fatalism in classical drama, this could be counteracted. The very idea of tragicomedy was controversial because the genre was a post-classical development, but tragicomedies became a popular Counter-Reformation form because they were suited to demonstrating the benign workings of divine providence, and endorsing the concept of free will. Giovanni Battista Guarini’s Il pastor fido (The Faithful Shepherd, written 1580s, published 1602) was the most influential tragicomedy of the period, while Tirso de Molina is especially notable for ingeniously subverting the implications of his tragic plots by means of comic endings. A similar theologically motivated overturning of generic expectation lies behind tragœdiæ sacræ such as Francesco Sforza Pallavicino’s Ermenegildo. This type of sacred tragedy developed from medieval dramatizations of saints’ lives; in them, martyr-protagonists die in a manner both tragic and triumphant. Enhancing Counter-Reformation Catholicism's encouragement of martyr cults, such plays could celebrate contemporary figures like Sir Thomas More — hero of several dramas across Europe — or be used to foment nationalistic sentiment.

=== Spanish Golden age theatre ===
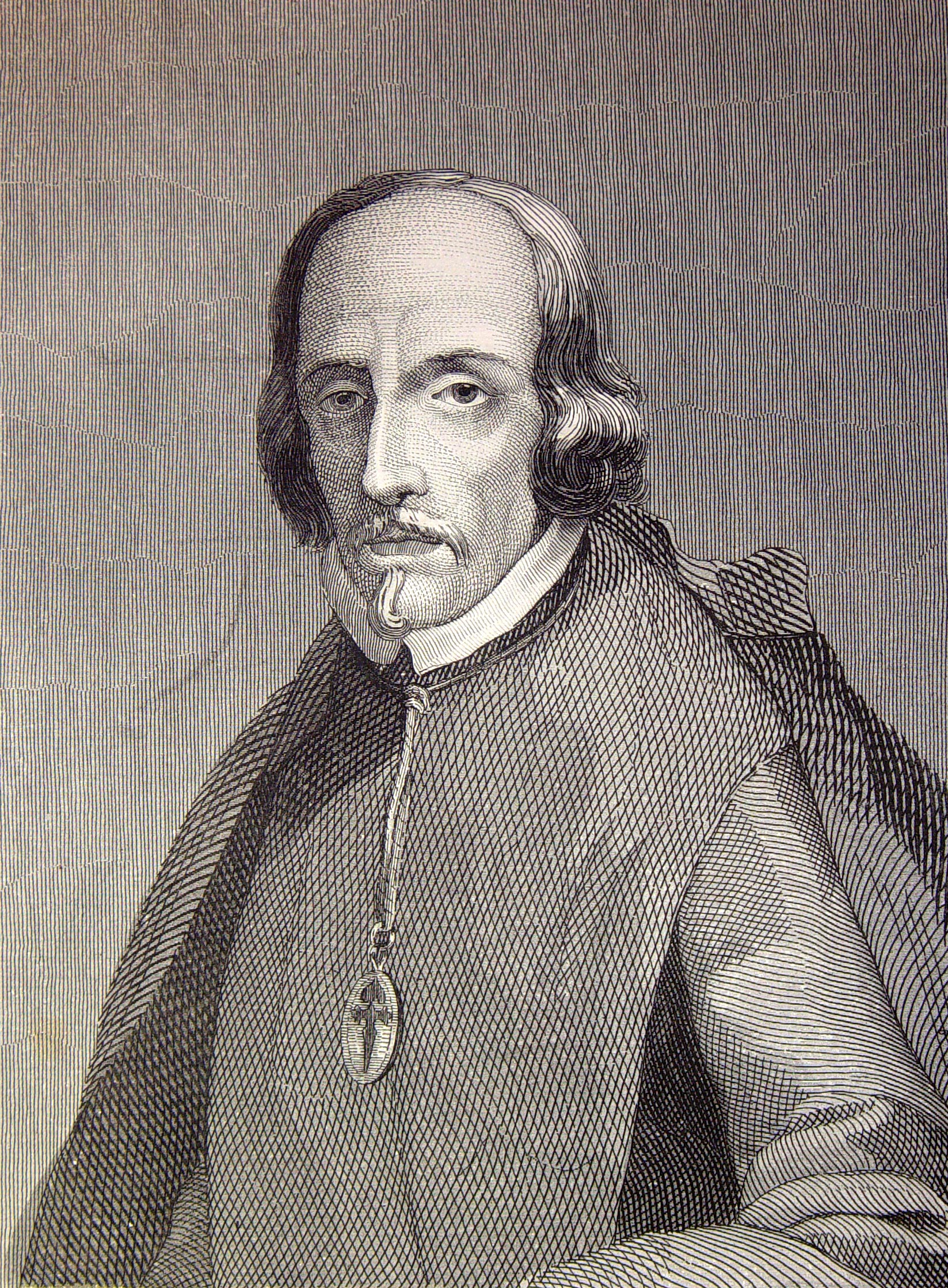
Calderon de la Barca, a key figure in the theatre of the Spanish Golden Age

During its Golden Age, roughly from 1590 to 1681, Spain saw a monumental increase in the production of live theatre as well as in the importance of theatre within Spanish society. It was an accessible art form for all participants in Renaissance Spain, being both highly sponsored by the aristocratic class and highly attended by the lower classes. The volume and variety of Spanish plays during the Golden Age was unprecedented in the history of world theatre, surpassing, for example, the dramatic production of the English Renaissance by a factor of at least four. Although this volume has been as much a source of criticism as praise for Spanish Golden Age theatre, for emphasizing quantity before quality, a large number of the 10,000 to 30,000 plays of this period are still considered masterpieces.

Major artists of the period included Lope de Vega, a contemporary of Shakespeare, often, and contemporaneously, seen his parallel for the Spanish stage, and Calderon de la Barca, inventor of the zarzuela and Lope's successor as the preeminent Spanish dramatist. Gil Vicente, Lope de Rueda, and Juan del Encina helped to establish the foundations of Spanish theatre in the mid-sixteenth centuries, while Francisco de Rojas Zorrilla and Tirso de Molina made significant contributions in the latter half of the Golden Age. Important performers included Lope de Rueda (previously mentioned among the playwrights) and later Juan Rana.

The sources of influence for the emerging national theatre of Spain were as diverse as the theatre that nation ended up producing. Storytelling traditions originating in Italian Commedia dell'arte and the uniquely Spanish expression of Western Europe's traveling minstrel entertainments contributed a populist influence on the narratives and the music, respectively, of early Spanish theatre. Neo-Aristotelian criticism and liturgical dramas, on the other hand, contributed literary and moralistic perspectives. In turn, Spanish Golden Age theatre has dramatically influenced the theatre of later generations in Europe and throughout the world. Spanish drama had an immediate and significant impact on the contemporary developments in English Renaissance theatre. It has also had a lasting impact on theatre throughout the Spanish speaking world. Additionally, a growing number of works are being translated, increasing the reach of Spanish Golden Age theatre and strengthening its reputation among critics and theatre patrons.

=== French Classical theatre ===
Pierre Corneille was a French tragedian. He is generally considered one of the three great 17th-century French dramatists, along with Molière and Racine. As a young man, he earned the valuable patronage of Cardinal Richelieu, who was trying to promote classical tragedy along formal lines, but later quarrelled with him, especially over his best-known play, Le Cid, about a medieval Spanish warrior, which was denounced by the newly formed Académie française for breaching the unities. He continued to write well-received tragedies for nearly forty years.

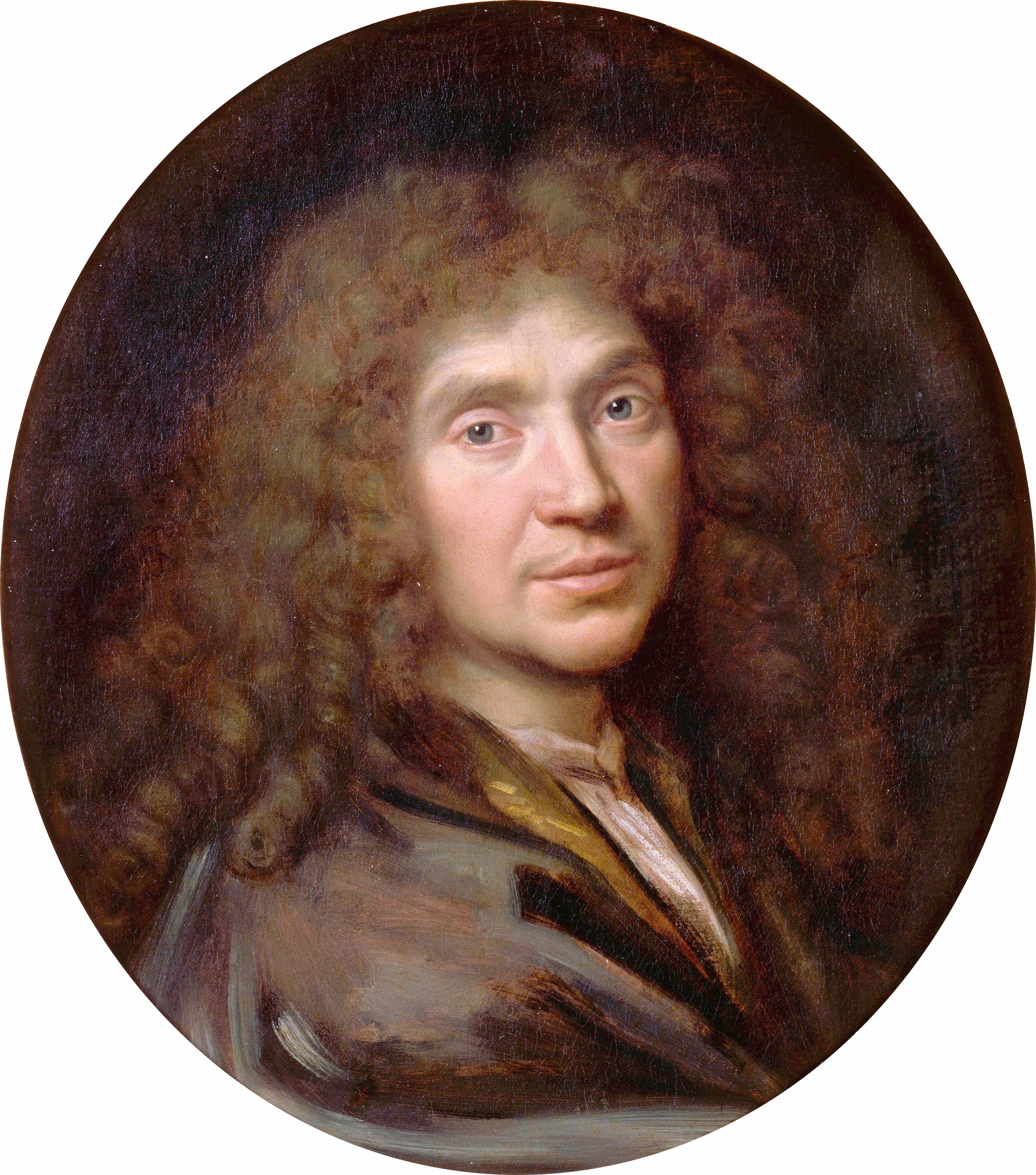
Portrait of Molière by Pierre Mignard (c. 1658)

Jean-Baptiste Poquelin, known by his stage name Molière, was a French playwright, actor, and poet, widely regarded as one of the great writers in the French language and world literature. His extant works include comedies, farces, tragicomedies, comédie-ballets, and more. His plays have been translated into every major living language and are performed at the Comédie-Française more often than those of any other playwright today. His influence is such that the French language is often referred to as the "language of Molière". Born into a prosperous family and having studied at the Collège de Clermont (now Lycée Louis-le-Grand), Molière was well suited to begin a life in the theatre. Thirteen years as an itinerant actor helped him polish his comedic abilities while he began writing, combining Commedia dell'arte elements with the more refined French comedy. Through the patronage of aristocrats including Philippe I, Duke of Orléans—the brother of Louis XIV—Molière procured a command performance before the King at the Louvre. Performing a classic play by Pierre Corneille and a farce of his own, The Doctor in Love, Molière was granted the use of the grande salle of the Petit-Bourbon near the Louvre, a spacious room appointed for theatrical performances. Later, he was granted the use of the theatre in the Palais-Royal. In both locations, Molière found success among Parisians with plays such as The Affected Ladies, The School for Husbands, and The School for Wives. This royal favour brought a royal pension to his troupe and the title Troupe du Roi ("The King's Troupe"). Molière continued as the official author of court entertainments. Despite the adulation of the court and Parisians, Molière's satires attracted criticism from other circles. For Tartuffe's impiety, the Catholic Church in France denounced this study of religious hypocrisy, which was followed by a ban by the Parlement, while Dom Juan was withdrawn and never restaged by Molière. His hard work in so many theatrical capacities took its toll on his health and, by 1667, he was forced to take a break from the stage. In 1673, during a production of his final play, The Imaginary Invalid, Molière, who suffered from pulmonary tuberculosis, was seized by a coughing fit and a haemorrhage while playing the hypochondriac Argan; he finished the performance but collapsed again and died a few hours later.

Jean Racine was a French dramatist, one of the three great playwrights of 17th-century France, along with Molière and Corneille, as well as an important literary figure in the Western tradition and world literature. Racine was primarily a tragedian, producing such "examples of neoclassical perfection" as Phèdre, Andromaque, and Athalie. He did write one comedy, Les Plaideurs, and a muted tragedy, Esther, for the young. Racine's plays displayed his mastery of the dodecasyllabic (12 syllable) French alexandrine. His writing is renowned for its elegance, purity, speed, and fury, and for what American poet Robert Lowell described as a "diamond-edge", and the "glory of its hard, electric rage". of both plot and stage.

=== Cretan Renaissance theatre ===
Greek theater was alive and flourishing on the island of Crete. During the Cretan Renaissance two notable Greek playwrights Georgios Chortatzis and Vitsentzos Kornaros were present in the latter part of the 16th century.

=== Restoration comedy ===
Refinement meets burlesque in Restoration comedy. In this scene from George Etherege's Love in a Tub (1664), musicians and well-bred ladies surround a man who is wearing a tub because he has lost his trousers.

After public stage performances had been banned for 18 years by the Puritan regime, the re-opening of the theatres in 1660 signalled a renaissance of English drama. With the restoration of the monarch in 1660 came the restoration of and the reopening of the theatre. English comedies written and performed in the Restoration period from 1660 to 1710 are collectively called "Restoration comedy". Restoration comedy is notorious for its sexual explicitness, a quality encouraged by Charles II (1660–1685) personally and by the rakish aristocratic ethos of his court. For the first time women were allowed to act, putting an end to the practice of the boy-player taking the parts of women. Socially diverse audiences included both aristocrats, their servants and hangers-on, and a substantial middle-class segment. Restoration audiences liked to see good triumph in their tragedies and rightful government restored. In comedy they liked to see the love-lives of the young and fashionable, with a central couple bringing their courtship to a successful conclusion (often overcoming the opposition of the elders to do so). Heroines had to be chaste, but were independent-minded and outspoken; now that they were played by women, there was more mileage for the playwright in disguising them in men's clothes or giving them narrow escape from rape. These playgoers were attracted to the comedies by up-to-the-minute topical writing, by crowded and bustling plots, by the introduction of the first professional actresses, and by the rise of the first celebrity actors. To non-theatre-goers these comedies were widely seen as licentious and morally suspect, holding up the antics of a small, privileged, and decadent class for admiration. This same class dominated the audiences of the Restoration theatre. This period saw the first professional woman playwright, Aphra Behn.

As a reaction to the decadence of Charles II era productions, sentimental comedy grew in popularity. This genre focused on encouraging virtuous behavior by showing middle class characters overcoming a series of moral trials. Playwrights like Colley Cibber and Richard Steele believed that humans were inherently good but capable of being led astray. Through plays such as The Conscious Lovers and Love's Last Shift they strove to appeal to an audience's noble sentiments in order that viewers could be reformed.

=== Restoration spectacular ===
The Restoration spectacular, or elaborately staged "machine play", hit the London public stage in the late 17th-century Restoration period, enthralling audiences with action, music, dance, moveable scenery, baroque illusionistic painting, gorgeous costumes, and special effects such as trapdoor tricks, "flying" actors, and fireworks. These shows have always had a bad reputation as a vulgar and commercial threat to the witty, "legitimate" Restoration drama; however, they drew Londoners in unprecedented numbers and left them dazzled and delighted.

Basically home-grown and with roots in the early 17th-century court masque, though never ashamed of borrowing ideas and stage technology from French opera, the spectaculars are sometimes called "English opera". However, the variety of them is so untidy that most theatre historians despair of defining them as a genre at all. Only a handful of works of this period are usually accorded the term "opera", as the musical dimension of most of them is subordinate to the visual. It was spectacle and scenery that drew in the crowds, as shown by many comments in the diary of the theatre-lover Samuel Pepys. The expense of mounting ever more elaborate scenic productions drove the two competing theatre companies into a dangerous spiral of huge expenditure and correspondingly huge losses or profits. A fiasco such as John Dryden's Albion and Albanius would leave a company in serious debt, while blockbusters like Thomas Shadwell's Psyche or Dryden's King Arthur would put it comfortably in the black for a long time.

=== 18th-century theatre ===
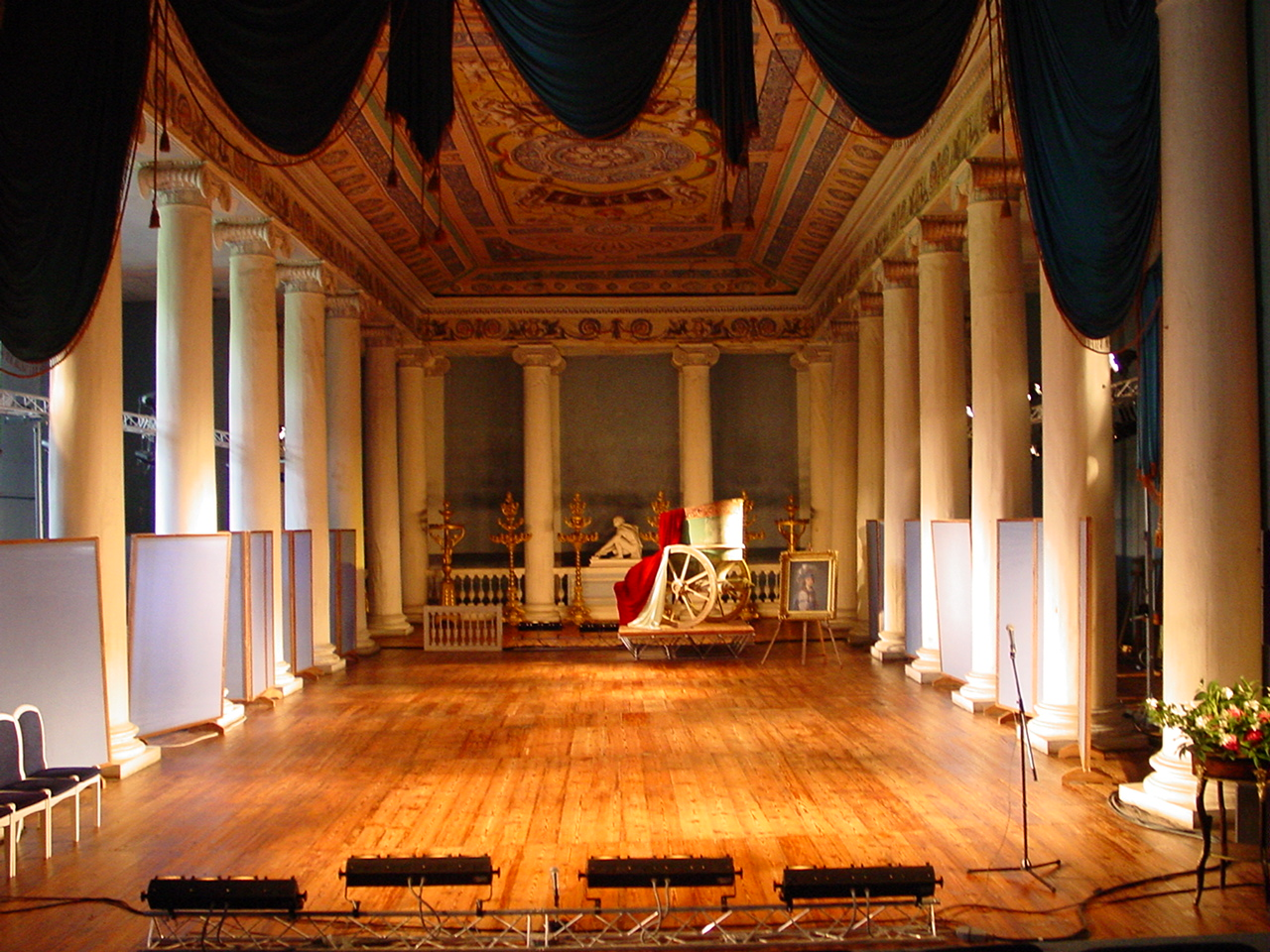
An 18th-century Neoclassical theatre in Ostankino, Moscow

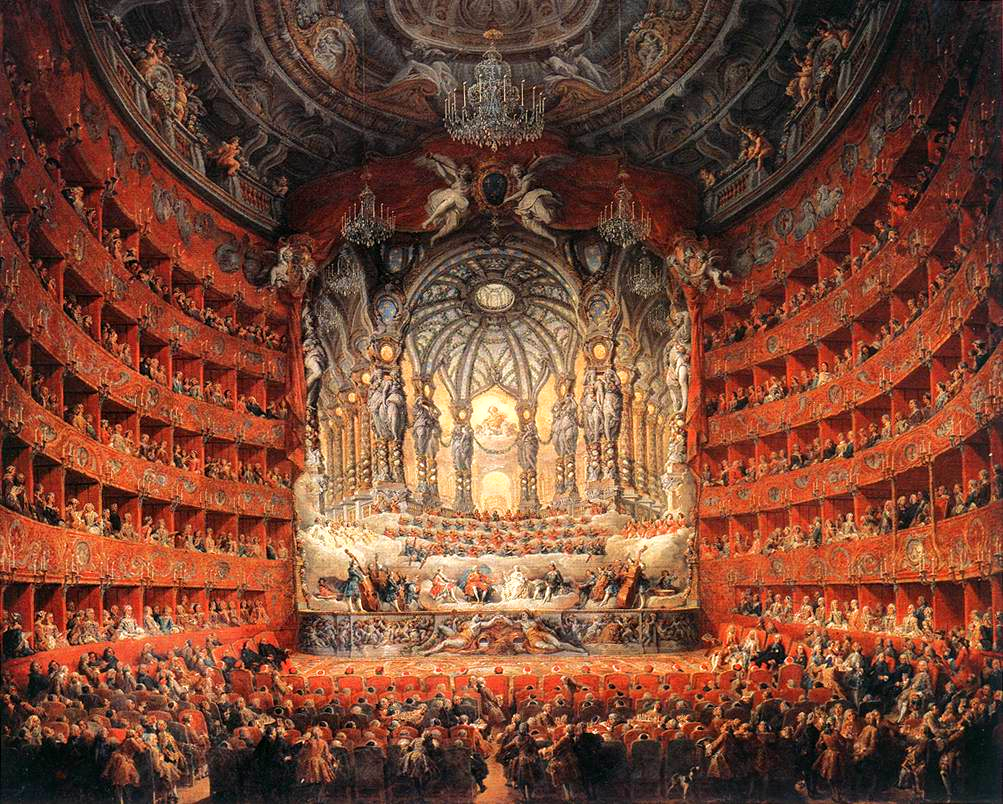
Teatro Argentina of Rome in 1747

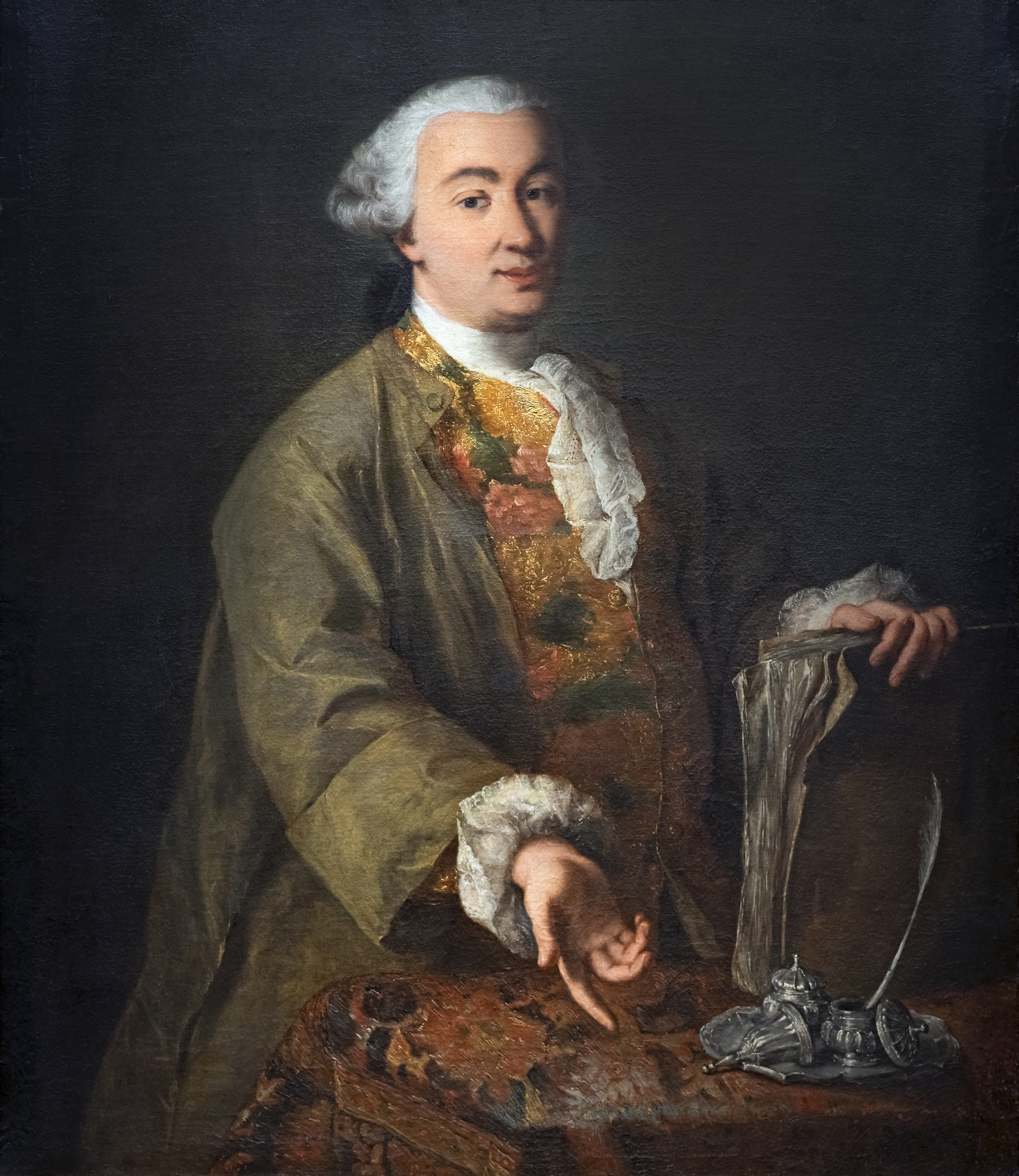
Carlo Goldoni

Neoclassicism was the dominant form of theatre in the 18th century. It demanded decorum and rigorous adherence to the classical unities. Neoclassical theatre as well as the time period is characterized by its grandiosity. The costumes and scenery were intricate and elaborate. The acting is characterized by large gestures and melodrama. Neoclassical theatre encompasses the Restoration, Augustan, and Johnstinian Ages. In one sense, the neo-classical age directly follows the time of the Renaissance. Theatres of the early 18th century – sexual farces of the Restoration were superseded by politically satirical comedies, 1737 Parliament passed the Stage Licensing Act 1737 which introduced state censorship of public performances and limited the number of theatres in London to two.

This century was a difficult period for the Italian theatre. Commedia dell'arte spread throughout Europe, but it underwent a clear decline as the dramaturgy decreased and little attention was paid to the texts it offered, compared to other works from the rest of Europe. However, the Commedia dell'arte remained an important school that lasted more than 100 years, and important authors of the Renaissance period were unable to offer a wide range of works thus being able to build the foundations for a future school.

Carlo Goldoni did not break into the theatre scene as a revolutionary but as a reformer. At first he indulged the taste of the public, still tied to the old masks. In his first comedies the presence of Pantalone, Brighella and with a great Harlequin, perhaps the last of a large caliber in Italy, like Antonio Sacco who played with the mask of Truffaldino, is constant. For this company Goldoni wrote important comedies such as The Servant of Two Masters and La putta onorata. In 1750 the Venetian lawyer wrote the manifesto text of his comedy reform: Il teatro comico. In this comedy the ancient Commedia dell'arte and its Commedia riformata are compared. Carlo Goldoni used new companies from which the masks, by now too improbable in a realist theatre, disappeared, just as their jokes and jokes, often unrelated to the subject, disappeared. In his riformate comedies the plot returns to being the central point of the comedy and the most realistic characters. Francesco Albergati Capacelli, a great friend of Goldoni and his first follower, continued along this line.

Goldonism was fiercely opposed by Pietro Chiari, who preferred more romantic and still Baroque-style comedies. Later, in the critique of the Goldonian reform, Carlo Gozzi also joined the group who hindered the reform, dedicating himself to the exhumation of the ancient 17th century Commedia dell'arte, now moribund, but still vital in its academic variant: the Commedia ridicolosa which, until the end of the century continued to use the masks and characters of that of art. The tragedy, in Italy, did not have the development it had had, since the previous century, in other European nations. In this case, Italy suffered from the success of the Commedia dell'arte. The path of the Enlightenment tragedy was followed by Antonio Conti, with moderate success. Aimed at the French theatre is the work of Pier Jacopo Martello who adapted the Alexandrian verse of the French to the Italian language, which was called Martellian verse. But the major theorist who pursued the path of an Italian tragedy of Greek-Aristotelian style was Gian Vincenzo Gravina. His tragedies, however, did not have the hoped-for success because they were considered unsuitable for representation. While his pupil Pietro Metastasio adapted Gravina's teachings by applying them to the lyrics of the melodrama. Other librettists such as Apostolo Zeno and Ranieri de' Calzabigi followed him on this path. The greatest tragedian of the early 18th century was Scipione Maffei who finally managed to compose an Italian tragedy worthy of the name: the Merope. In the second half of the century the figure of Vittorio Alfieri, the greatest Italian tragedian of the 18th century, dominated.

=== 19th-century theatre ===
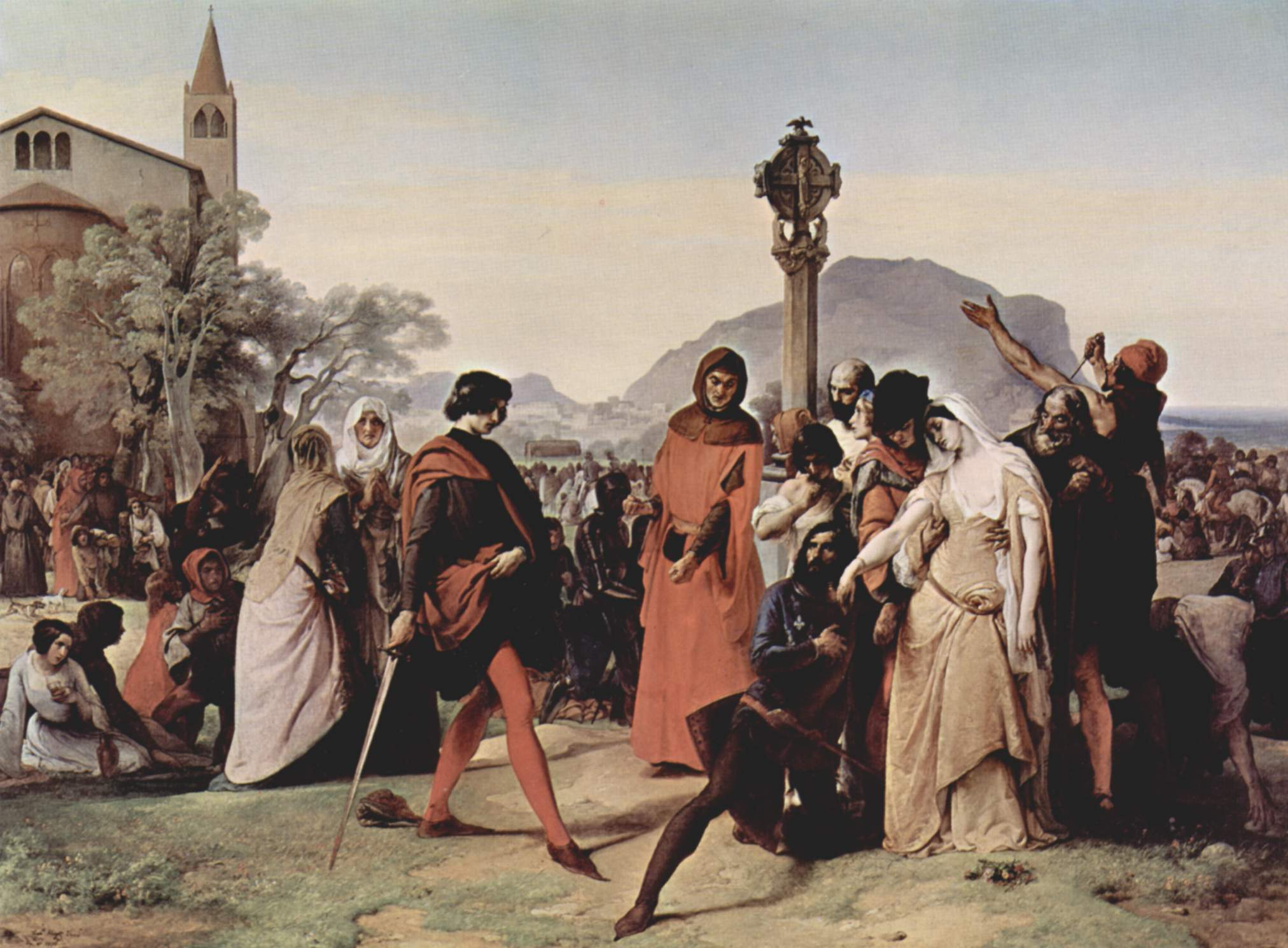
Francesco Hayez, First act of Sicilian Vespers

Theatre in the 19th century is divided into two parts: early and late. The early period was dominated by melodrama and Romanticism. During the 19th century, the romantic drama was born. There were important authors promoting the genre, such as Alessandro Manzoni and Silvio Pellico. In the second half of the century, the romantic tragedy gave way to the Teatro verista, which saw Giovanni Verga and Emilio Praga among the greatest exponents.

The romantic drama was preceded by a period close to Neoclassicism, represented by the dramatic work of Ugo Foscolo and Ippolito Pindemonte aimed at Greek tragedy. Vittorio Alfieri himself, who spans the two centuries, can be defined, together with Vincenzo Monti, forerunner and symbol of neoclassical tragedy.

Beginning in France, melodrama became the most popular theatrical form. August von Kotzebue's Misanthropy and Repentance (1789) is often considered the first melodramatic play. The plays of Kotzebue and René Charles Guilbert de Pixérécourt established melodrama as the dominant dramatic form of the early 19th century.

In Germany, there was a trend toward historical accuracy in costumes and settings, a revolution in theatre architecture, and the introduction of the theatrical form of German Romanticism. Influenced by trends in 19th-century philosophy and the visual arts, German writers were increasingly fascinated with their Teutonic past and had a growing sense of nationalism. The plays of Gotthold Ephraim Lessing, Johann Wolfgang von Goethe, Friedrich Schiller, and other Sturm und Drang playwrights inspired a growing faith in feeling and instinct as guides to moral behavior.

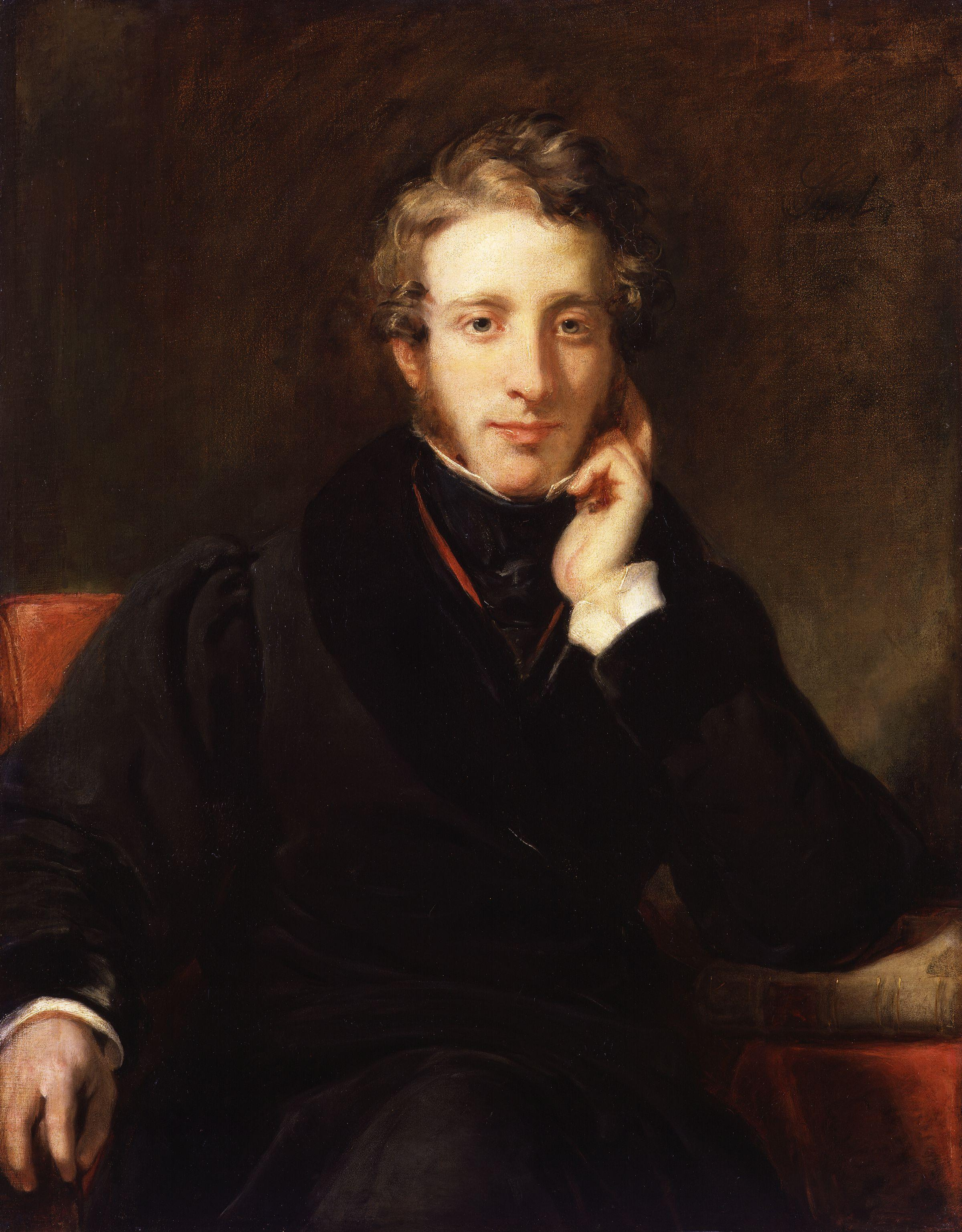
Edward Bulwer-Lytton.

In Britain, Percy Bysshe Shelley and Lord Byron were the most important dramatists of their time although Shelley's plays were not performed until later in the century. In the minor theatres, burletta and melodrama were the most popular. Kotzebue's plays were translated into English and Thomas Holcroft's A Tale of Mystery was the first of many English melodramas. Pierce Egan, Douglas William Jerrold, Edward Fitzball, and John Baldwin Buckstone initiated a trend towards more contemporary and rural stories in preference to the usual historical or fantastical melodramas. James Sheridan Knowles and Edward Bulwer-Lytton established a "gentlemanly" drama that began to re-establish the former prestige of the theatre with the aristocracy.

An evolution similar to the theatrical drama takes place in the field of theatre for music. At the beginning of this century, the Melodramma romantico replaced the Neapolitan and then Venetian Opera buffa. A work close to the great medieval themes of the Risorgimento period was born. There are several librettists who support the musicians by building new types of epic narration for music. From Felice Romani, librettist of the early 19th century for the works of Vincenzo Bellini, up to Arrigo Boito and Francesco Maria Piave, who with the librettos for Giuseppe Verdi opened the Risorgimento period of Italian musical theatre. Boito was also one of the few who combined dramatic talent with musical talent. His opera Mefistofele, with music and libretto by the author, has a historical character, and is an important step in the evolution of the Italian theatre.

The later period of the 19th century saw the rise of two conflicting types of drama: realism and non-realism, such as Symbolism and precursors of Expressionism.

Realism began earlier in the 19th century in Russia than elsewhere in Europe and took a more uncompromising form. Beginning with the plays of Ivan Turgenev (who used "domestic detail to reveal inner turmoil"), Aleksandr Ostrovsky (who was Russia's first professional playwright), Aleksey Pisemsky (whose A Bitter Fate (1859) anticipated Naturalism), and Leo Tolstoy (whose The Power of Darkness (1886) is "one of the most effective of naturalistic plays"), a tradition of psychological realism in Russia culminated with the establishment of the Moscow Art Theatre by Konstantin Stanislavski and Vladimir Nemirovich-Danchenko.

The most important theatrical force in later 19th-century Germany was that of Georg II, Duke of Saxe-Meiningen and his Meiningen Ensemble, under the direction of Ludwig Chronegk. The Ensemble's productions are often considered the most historically accurate of the 19th century, although his primary goal was to serve the interests of the playwright. The Meiningen Ensemble stands at the beginning of the new movement toward unified production (or what Richard Wagner would call the Gesamtkunstwerk) and the rise of the director (at the expense of the actor) as the dominant artist in theatre-making.

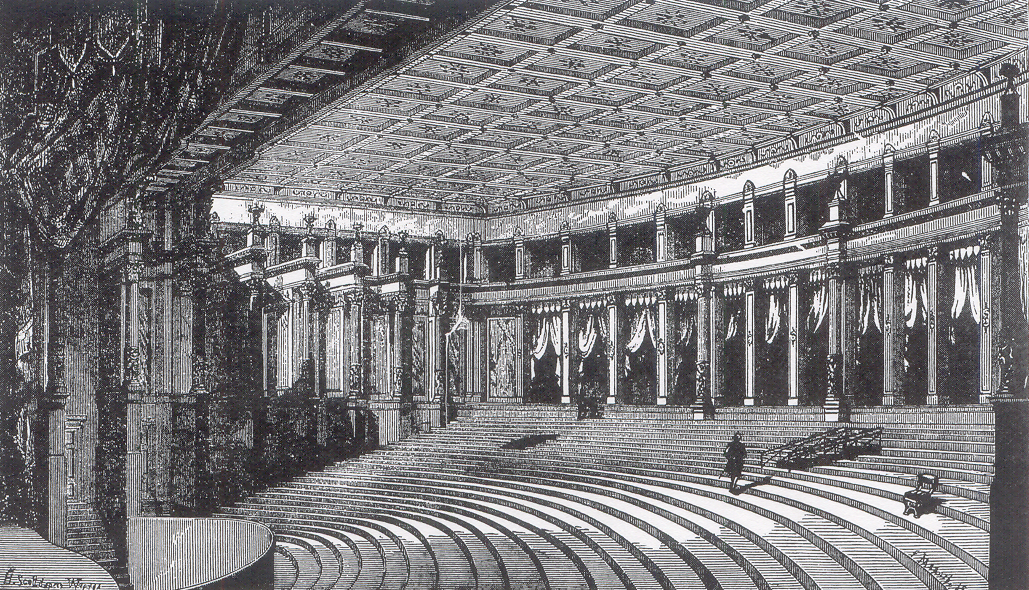
Richard Wagner's Bayreuth Festival Theatre.

Naturalism, a theatrical movement born out of Charles Darwin's The Origin of Species (1859) and contemporary political and economic conditions, found its main proponent in Émile Zola. The realisation of Zola's ideas was hindered by a lack of capable dramatists writing naturalist drama. André Antoine emerged in the 1880s with his Théâtre Libre that was only open to members and therefore was exempt from censorship. He quickly won the approval of Zola and began to stage Naturalistic works and other foreign realistic pieces.

In Britain, melodramas, light comedies, operas, Shakespeare and classic English drama, Victorian burlesque, pantomimes, translations of French farces and, from the 1860s, French operettas, continued to be popular. So successful were the comic operas of Gilbert and Sullivan, such as H.M.S. Pinafore (1878) and The Mikado (1885), that they greatly expanded the audience for musical theatre. This, together with much improved street lighting and transportation in London and New York led to a late Victorian and Edwardian theatre building boom in the West End and on Broadway. Later, the work of Henry Arthur Jones and Arthur Wing Pinero initiated a new direction on the English stage.

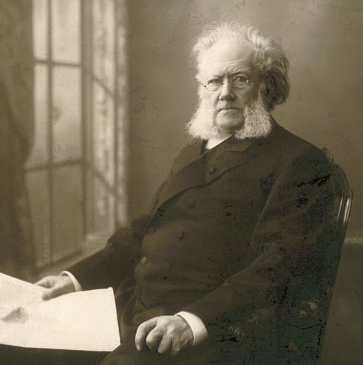
Henrik Ibsen

While their work paved the way, the development of more significant drama owes itself most to the playwright Henrik Ibsen. Ibsen was born in Norway in 1828. He wrote twenty-five plays, the most famous of which are A Doll's House (1879), Ghosts (1881), The Wild Duck (1884), and Hedda Gabler (1890). In addition, his works Rosmersholm (1886) and When We Dead Awaken (1899) evoke a sense of mysterious forces at work in human destiny, which was to be a major theme of symbolism and the so-called "Theatre of the Absurd".

After Ibsen, British theatre experienced revitalization with the work of George Bernard Shaw, Oscar Wilde, John Galsworthy, William Butler Yeats, and Harley Granville Barker. Unlike most of the gloomy and intensely serious work of their contemporaries, Shaw and Wilde wrote primarily in the comic form. Edwardian musical comedies were extremely popular, appealing to the tastes of the middle class in the Gay Nineties and catering to the public's preference for escapist entertainment during World War 1.

=== 20th and 21st-centuries theatre ===
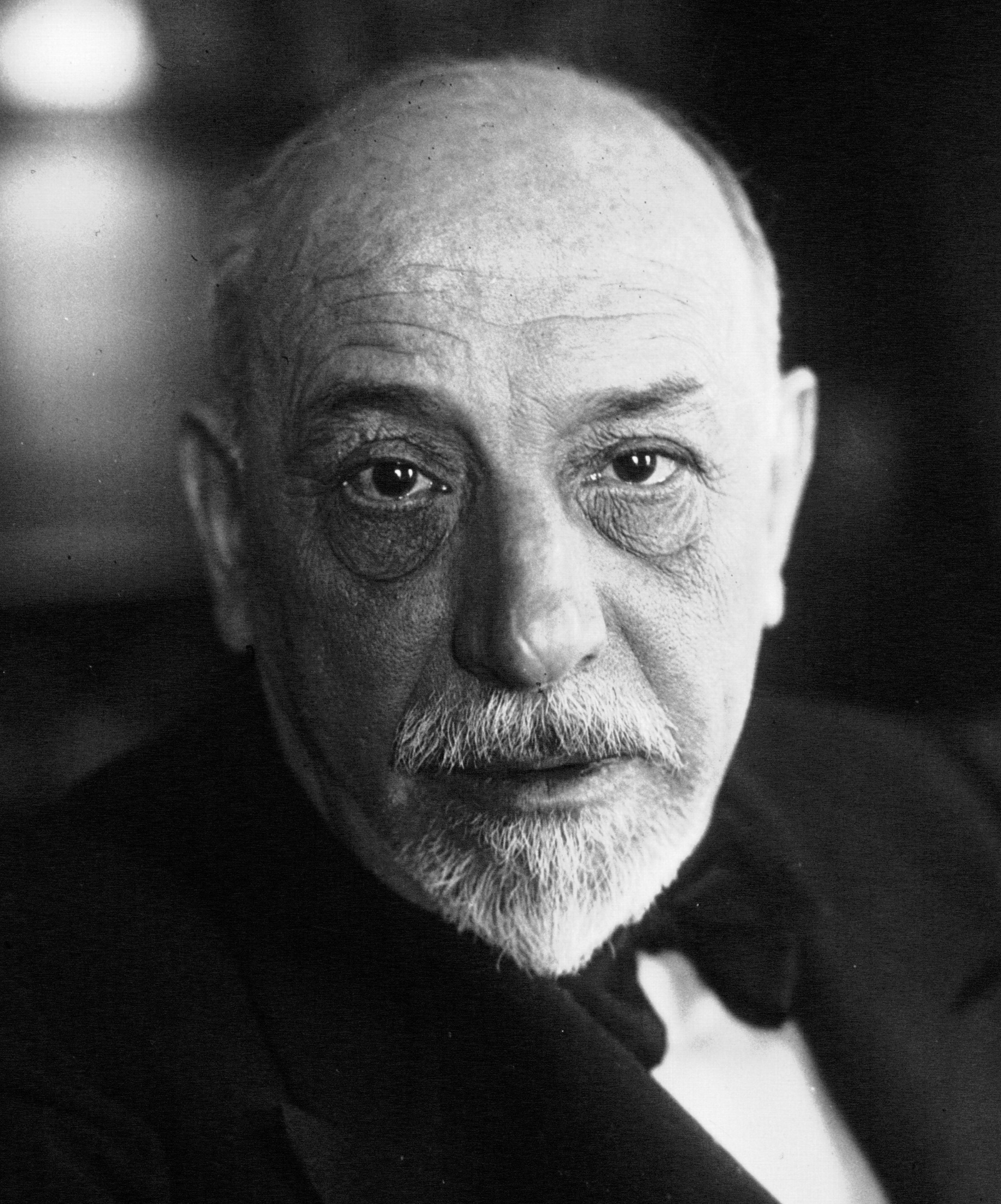
Luigi Pirandello's tragic farces are often seen as forerunners of the Theatre of the Absurd.

While much 20th-century theatre continued and extended the projects of realism and Naturalism, there was also a great deal of experimental theatre that rejected those conventions. These experiments form part of the modernist and postmodernist movements and included forms of political theatre as well as more aesthetically orientated work. Examples include: Epic theatre, the Theatre of Cruelty, and the so-called "Theatre of the Absurd".

Important playwrights were born during the 20th century, laying the foundations for the modern Italian theatre. The genius of Luigi Pirandello stands out above all, considered the "father of modern theatre". With the Sicilian author, the Dramma psicologico was born, essentially characterized by the introspective aspect. Another great exponent of the 20th century dramaturgical theatre was Eduardo De Filippo. He, son of the aforementioned Eduardo Scarpetta, managed to restore the dialect within the theatrical work, eliminating the widespread conception of the past that defined the dialectal work as a second level work. With Eduardo de Filippo, the Teatro popolare was born.

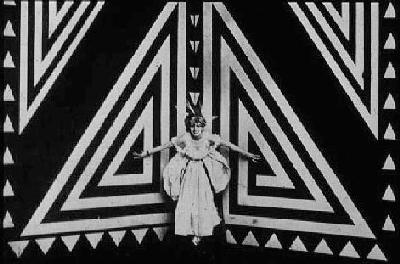
Thais by Anton Giulio Bragaglia with futurist scenographies by Enrico Prampolini

At the beginning of the century, the influences of the historical avant-gardes made themselves felt: Futurism, Dadaism and Surrealism. Especially futurism tried to change the idea of modern Italian theatre by adapting it to new ideas. Filippo Tommaso Marinetti took an interest in writing the various Futurist Manifests on his new idea of theatre. Together with Bruno Corra he created what was called synthetic theatre. Later the Futurists formed a company, directed by Rodolfo De Angelis, which was called the Teatro della sorpresa. The presence of a scenographer like Enrico Prampolini shifted the attention more to the very modern scenographies than to the often disappointing acting. Another character who attended the theatre in this period, without notable success compared to other literary and poetic productions, was Gabriele D'Annunzio. Of him there are some tragedies of a classical context, close to the Liberty style characteristic of the whole production of the warrior-poet.

At the same time, the Teatro grottesco was born, and it was an almost entirely Italian phenomenon. Other frequenters of this genre include Massimo Bontempelli, Luigi Antonelli, Enrico Cavacchioli, Luigi Chiarelli, Pier Maria Rosso di San Secondo and Pirandello himself in his first plays. In the period of Italian fascism the theatre was held in great esteem. The theatre during the fascist regime was a means of political propaganda like cinema, the popular spectacle par excellence. Giovanni Gentile drew up a manifesto of support for the regime of Italian intellectuals. Among the signatories some important figures of the theatre of the period: Luigi Pirandello, Salvatore di Giacomo, Filippo Tommaso Marinetti and Gabriele D'Annunzio. In 1925 the philosopher Benedetto Croce contrasted his Manifesto of the anti-fascist intellectuals, signed, among others, by the playwrights Roberto Bracco and Sem Benelli. During this period the two directors of the Bragaglia family were important: Carlo Ludovico Bragaglia and Anton Giulio Bragaglia who joined the more experimental productions of the period, later moved on to the cinema.

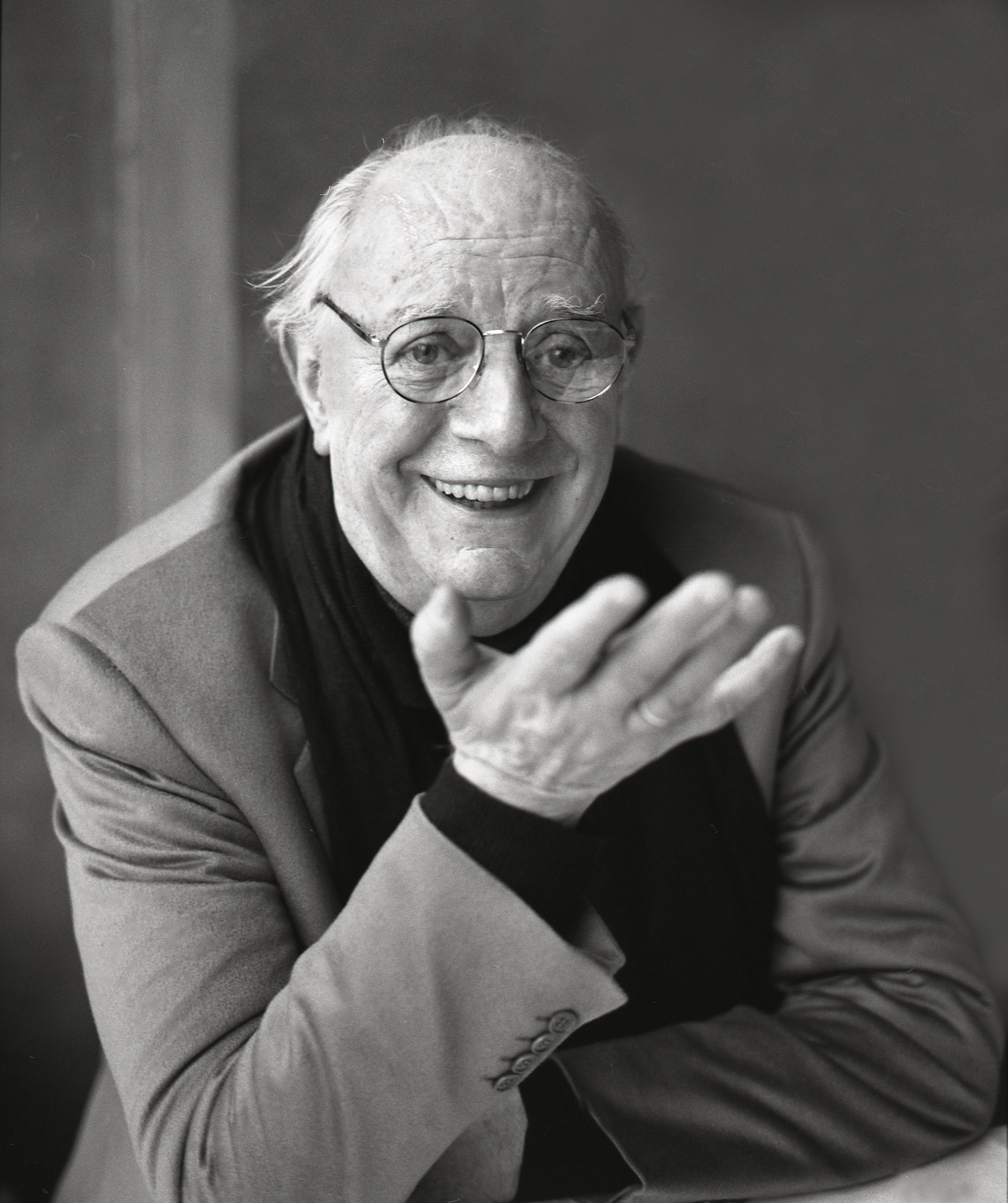
Dario Fo, one of the most widely performed playwrights in modern theatre, received international acclaim for his highly improvisational style. He was awarded the Nobel Prize for Literature in 1997.

The second post-war period was characterized by the Teatro di rivista. This was already present previously with great actor-authors such as Ettore Petrolini. From the magazine, actors such as Erminio Macario and Totò imposed themselves. Then large companies such as that of Dario Niccodemi and actors of the level of Eleonora Duse, Ruggero Ruggeri, Memo Benassi and Sergio Tofano were also important. Equally important was the contribution of great directors in post-war Italian theatre such as Giorgio Strehler, Luchino Visconti and Luca Ronconi. An interesting experiment was that of Dario Fo, who was greatly influenced by Bertolt Brecht's epic and political theatre, but at the same time he returned to the Italian theatre the centrality of the pure actor in ruzantesque terms with his opera Mistero Buffo which with the grammelot gave the theatre of fools and storytellers of the Middle Ages.

Carmelo Bene's theatre was more linked to experimentalism. The Apulian actor-playwright also tried to bring acting back to the center of attention, reworking the texts of the past, from William Shakespeare to Alfred de Musset, but also Alessandro Manzoni and Vladimir Mayakovsky. The experience of the Lombard playwright Giovanni Testori also deserves to be mentioned, for the breadth of his commitment - he was a writer, director, impresario -, the multiformity of the genres practiced, linguistic experimentalism: he worked extensively with the actor Franco Branciaroli and together they profoundly influenced the post-war Milanese theatre.

The term theatre practitioner came to be used to describe someone who both creates theatrical performances and who produces a theoretical discourse that informs their practical work. A theatre practitioner may be a director, a dramatist, an actor, or—characteristically—often a combination of these traditionally separate roles. "Theatre practice" describes the collective work that various theatre practitioners do. It is used to describe theatre praxis from Konstantin Stanislavski's development of his 'system', through Vsevolod Meyerhold's biomechanics, Bertolt Brecht's epic and Jerzy Grotowski's poor theatre, down to the present day, with contemporary theatre practitioners including Augusto Boal with his Theatre of the Oppressed, Eugenio Barba's theatre anthropology and Anne Bogart's viewpoints.

Other key figures of 20th-century theatre include: Antonin Artaud, August Strindberg, Anton Chekhov, Max Reinhardt, Frank Wedekind, Maurice Maeterlinck, Federico García Lorca, Eugene O'Neill, George Bernard Shaw, Gertrude Stein, Ernst Toller, Vladimir Mayakovsky, Arthur Miller, Tennessee Williams, Jean Genet, Eugène Ionesco, Samuel Beckett, Harold Pinter, Friedrich Dürrenmatt, Heiner Müller, and Caryl Churchill.

A number of aesthetic movements continued or emerged in the 20th century, including:

- Naturalism
- Realism
- Dadaism
- Expressionism
- Surrealism and the Theatre of Cruelty
- Theatre of the Absurd
- Postmodernism
- Agitprop

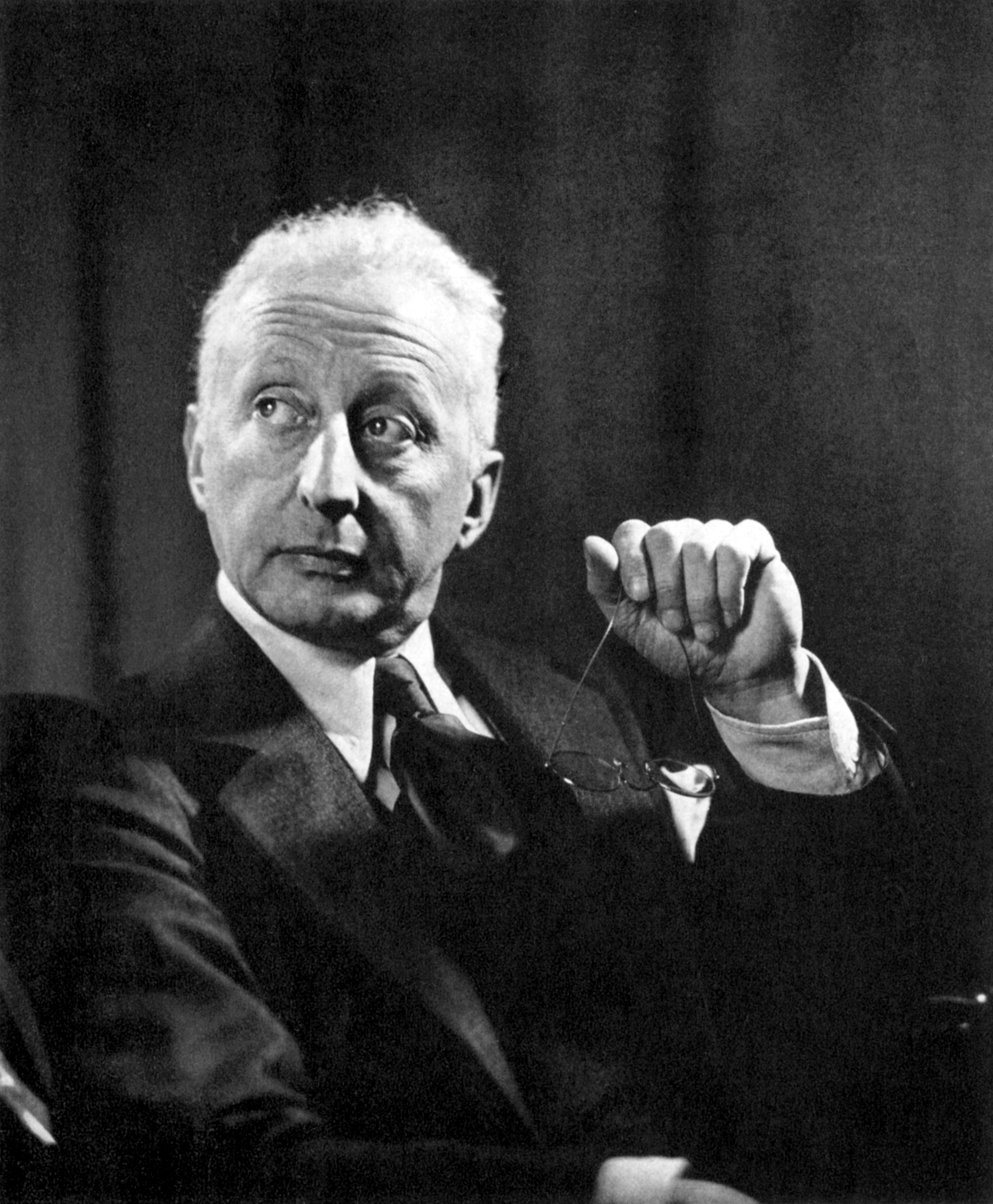
Jerome Kern

After the great popularity of the British Edwardian musical comedies, the American musical theatre came to dominate the musical stage, beginning with the Princess Theatre musicals, followed by the works of the Gershwin brothers, Cole Porter, Jerome Kern, Rodgers and Hart, and later Rodgers and Hammerstein. Experimentalism at the end of the century brings new frontiers of theatrical art, delivered in Italy to new companies such as the Magazzini Criminali, the Krypton and Socìetas Raffaello Sanzio, but also companies that frequent a more classic theatre such as the company of the Teatro dell'Elfo by Gabriele Salvatores. The Italian theatre of the end of the century also made use of the work of the author-actor Paolo Poli. Vittorio Gassman, Giorgio Albertazzi and Enrico Maria Salerno are to be remembered among the great word actors of the 20th century. In the theatre field, important monologists such as Marco Paolini and Ascanio Celestini have recently established themselves, authors of a narrative theatre based on in-depth research work.

== American theatre ==
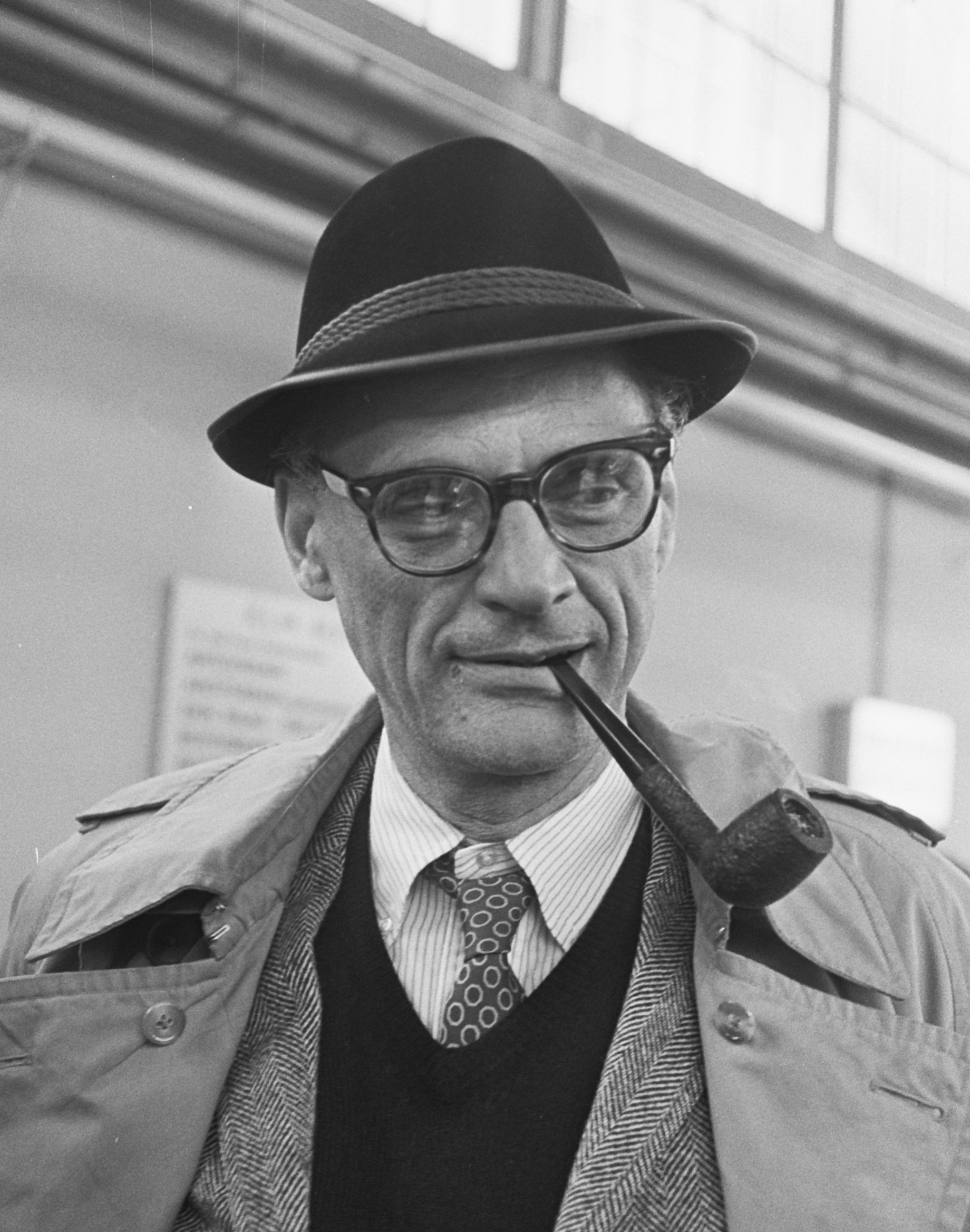
Arthur Miller

=== 1752 to 1895 Romanticism ===
Throughout most of history, English belles lettres and theatre have been separated, but these two art forms are interconnected. However, if they do not learn how to work hand-in-hand, it can be detrimental to the art form. The prose of English literature and the stories it tells needs to be performed and theatre has that capacity. From the start American theatre has been unique and diverse, reflecting society as America chased after its National identity. The very first play performed, in 1752 in Williamsburg Virginia, was Shakespeare's The Merchant of Venice. Due to a temporary Puritan society, theatre was banned from 1774 until 1789. This societal standard was due to the Puritan morality being permitted and any other entertainment were seen as inappropriate, frivolous (without purpose), and sensual (pleasurable). During the ban, theatre often hid by titling itself as moral lectures. Theatre took a brief pause because of the revolutionary war, but quickly resumed after the war ended in 1781. Theatre began to spread west, and often towns had theatres before they had sidewalks or sewers. There were several leading professional theatre companies early on, but one of the most influential was in Philadelphia (1794–1815); however, the company had shaky roots because of the ban on theatre.

As the country expanded so did theatre; following the war of 1812 theatre headed west. Many of the new theatres were community run, but in New Orleans a professional theatre had been started by the French in 1791. Several troupes broke off and established a theatre in Cincinnati, Ohio. The first official west theatre came in 1815 when Samuel Drake (1769–1854) took his professional theatre company from Albany to Pittsburgh to the Ohio River and Kentucky. Along with this circuit he would sometimes take the troupe to Lexington, Louisville, and Frankfort. At times, he would lead the troupe to Ohio, Indiana, Tennessee, and Missouri. While there were circuit riding troupes, more permanent theatre communities out west often sat on rivers so there would be easy boat access. During this time period very few theatres were above the Ohio River, and in fact Chicago did not have a permanent theatre until 1833. Because of the turbulent times in America and the economic crisis happening due to wars, theatre during its most expansive time, experienced bankruptcy and change of management. Also most early American theatre had great European influence because many of the actors had been English born and trained. Between 1800 and 1850 neoclassical philosophy almost completely passed away under romanticism which was a great influence of 19th-century American theatre that idolized the "noble savage." Due to new psychological discoveries and acting methods, eventually romanticism would give birth to realism. This trend toward realism occurred between 1870 and 1895.

=== 1895 to 1945 Realism ===
In this era of theatre, the moral hero shifts to the modern man who is a product of his environment. This major shift is due in part to the civil war because America was now stained with its own blood, having lost its innocence.

=== 1945 to 1990 ===
During this period of theatre, Hollywood emerged and threatened American theatre. However theatre during this time didn't decline but in fact was renowned and noticed worldwide. Tennessee Williams and Arthur Miller achieved worldwide fame during this period.

== Egyptian theatre ==
=== Ancient Egyptian quasi-theatrical events ===
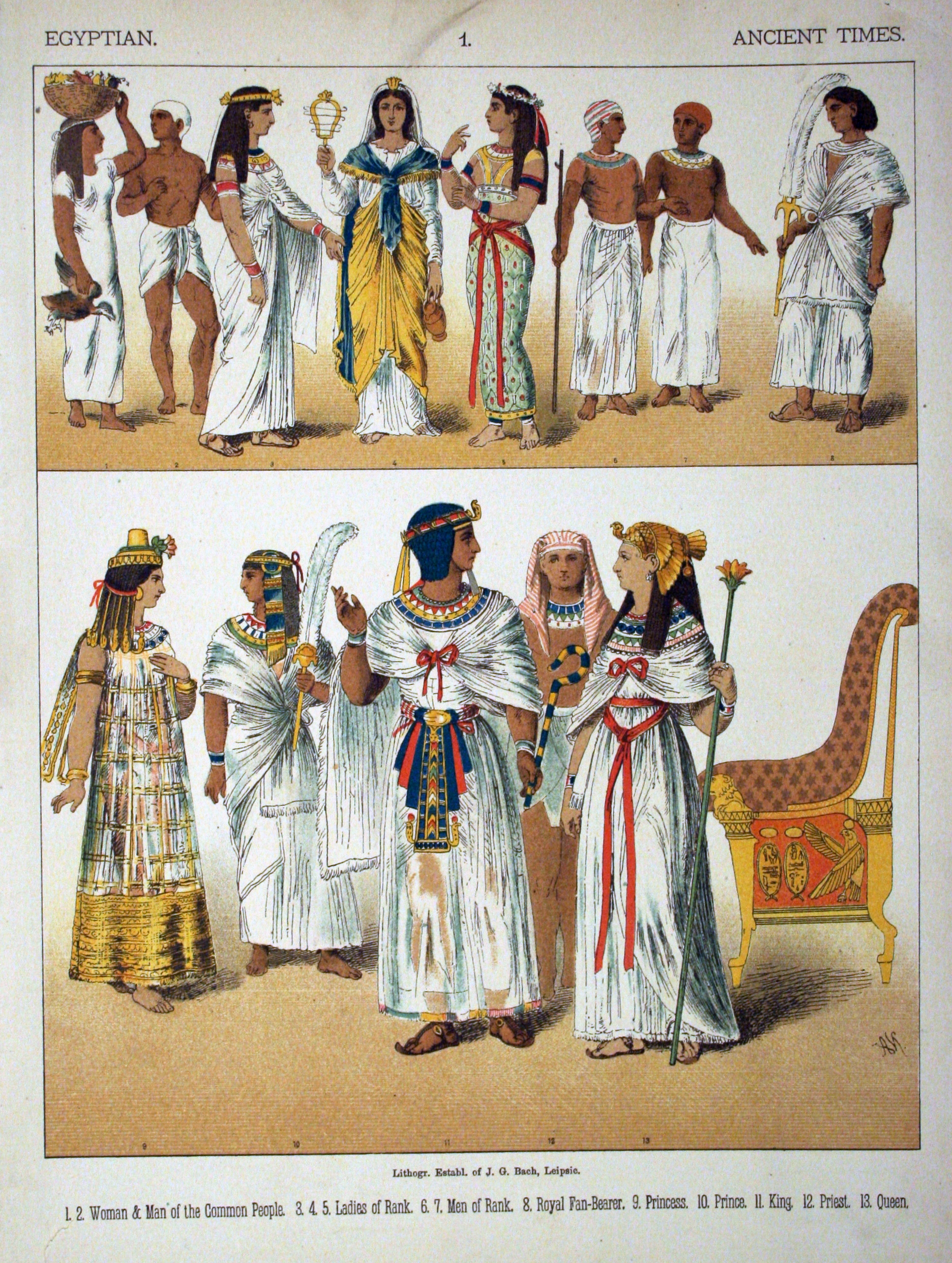
Ancient Egyptian theatre

The earliest recorded quasi-theatrical event dates back to 2000 BC with the "passion plays" of Ancient Egypt. The story of the god Osiris was performed annually at festivals throughout the civilization.

The most famous was the Abydos Passion Play (c. 2500 BCE – 550 BCE), which reenacted the death and resurrection of Osiris. It was a massive annual spectacle that included processions and mock battles. Scripted plays like The Triumph of Horus (depicted at Temple of Edfu) detailed Horus's victory over Seth. These included specific acting notes, names of speakers, and musical cues. These focused on healing myths, such as Isis curing Horus from a scorpion sting, often used for both religious and educational purposes. Performed during a pharaoh's 30th-year jubilee to symbolically rejuvenate their divine power. Dramatized the sun god Ra's nightly battle against the serpent Apophis to ensure the sunrise.

=== Modern Egyptian theater ===
In the modern era, the art of theater was evolved in the second half of the nineteenth century through interaction with Europe. As well as the development of popular theatrical forms that Egypt knew thousands of years before this date.

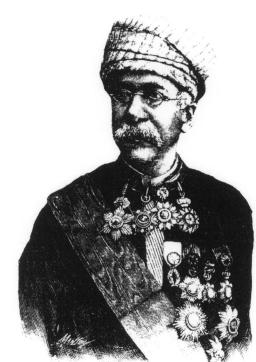
Yaqub Sanu

The beginning was by Yaqub Sanu and Abu Khalil Qabbani, then the situation was divided into free theatrical groups, including the Youssef Wahbi troupe such as Fatima Rushdi, which presents tragedy or tragedy, and Abo El Seoud El Ebiary, Ismail Yassine, Badie' Khayri, Ali El Kassar and Naguib El-Rihani in presenting comedy in another way.

More than 350 plays were presented in the so-called halls theater in the 1930s and 1940s, co-presented by Bayram El-Tunisi, Amin Sedky, Badie' Khayri and Abo El Seoud El Ebiary and directed by Aziz Eid, Bishara Wakim and Abdel Aziz Khalil. In addition to important statistics, including that the longest-lived private sector group is the Rihani band. Its activity lasted 67 years, starting from 1916 until 1983, nearly seventy years. The most prolific private sector group is the Ramses Troupe, which produced more than 240 plays from 1923 to 1960. The longest-lived state theater troupe is the National Theater Troupe, which lasted for over 80 years, starting from 1935 until now.

After the 1952 revolution, there was a group of playwrights such as Alfred Farag, and Ali Salem, Noaman Ashour, Saad Eddin Wahba and others. Zaki, as for the country teams, the most prolific directors in production are the artists Fattouh Nashati, and Zaki Tulaimat.

Among the Egyptian playwrights whose works were presented on stage are Amin Sedky, Badi’ Khairy, Abu Al-Saud Al-Ebiary, and Tawfiq Al-Hakim. Most of the world's playwrights whose works were presented on the stage are Molière, Pierre Corneille and William Shakespeare.

The women's imprint was clear in the history of Egyptian theater, which Mounira El Mahdeya started as the first Egyptian singer and actress, and the founder of a theater group in her name at the beginning of the twentieth century instead of Levantines and Jews. Before that time, women were forbidden to act, which caused a noise that contributed to the increase in her fame. And Mounira El Mahdeya was also the one who discovered the musician of the generations, Mohammed Abdel Wahab, and gave him the opportunity to complete the melodies of Cleopatra and Mark Antony's play after the sudden death of Sayed Darwish. She encouraged him to stand in front of her, embodying the role of Mark Antonio in the same show. Starting from early 1960s, movie stars started invading theaters such as Salah Zulfikar in A Bullet in the Heart of 1964, based on Tawfiq Al-Hakim's 1933 novel, and many others. In the 1970s, the comedy was the dominant such as Al Ayal Kibrit of 1979.

In 2020, the Egyptian Minister of Culture, Dr. Ines Abdel-Dayem dedicates the next session of the National Festival of Egyptian Theater to celebrate the 150th anniversary of the beginning of the modern Egyptian theater. It will review the findings of the research team, consisting of Amr Dawara, the theater memory guard, who started since 1993 to prepare the largest Egyptian theater encyclopedia that includes all the details of professional theatrical performances during fifteen decades, starting from 1870 by Yacub Sanu until 2019, during which the number of performances reached 6300 professional works, which were presented to the public for a fee at the box office. And addressed the book body to print the encyclopedia. And that encyclopedia will help the reader and researcher to know the masterpieces and creations of Egyptian theater throughout its history.

== African theatre ==
=== West African theatre ===
==== Ghanaian theatre ====
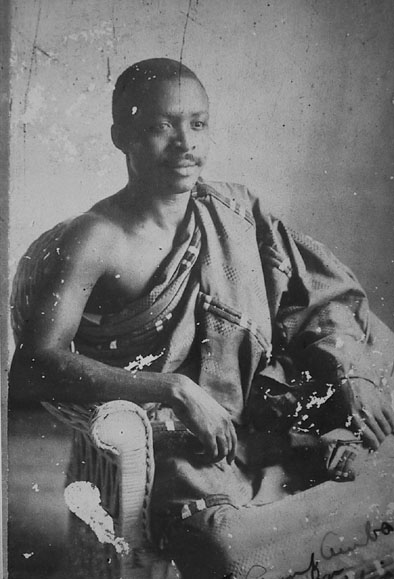
Kobina Sekyi

Modern theatre in Ghana emerged in the early 20th century. It emerged first as literary comment on the colonization of Africa by Europe. Among the earliest work in which this can be seen is The Blinkards written by Kobina Sekyi in 1915. The Blinkards is a blatant satire about the Africans who embraced the European culture that was brought to them. In it Sekyi demeans three groups of individuals: anyone European, anyone who imitates the Europeans, and the rich African cocoa farmer. This sudden rebellion though was just the beginning spark of Ghanaian literary theatre.

A play that has similarity in its satirical view is Anowa. Written by Ghanaian author Ama Ata Aidoo, it begins with its eponymous heroine Anowa rejecting her many arranged suitors' marriage proposals. She insists on making her own decisions as to whom she is going to marry. The play stresses the need for gender equality, and respect for women. This ideal of independence, as well as equality leads Anowa down a winding path of both happiness and misery. Anowa chooses a man of her own to marry. Anowa supports her husband Kofi both physically and emotionally. Through her support Kofi does prosper in wealth, but becomes poor as a spiritual being. Through his accumulation of wealth Kofi loses himself in it. His once happy marriage with Anowa becomes changed when he begins to hire slaves rather than doing any labor himself. This to Anowa does not make sense because it makes Kofi no better than the European colonists whom she detests for the way that she feels they have used the people of Africa. Their marriage is childless, which is presumed to have been caused by a ritual that Kofi has done trading his manhood for wealth. Anowa's viewing Kofi's slave-gotten wealth and inability to have a child leads to her committing suicide. The name Anowa means "Superior moral force" while Kofi's means only "Born on Friday". This difference in even the basis of their names seems to implicate the moral superiority of women in a male run society.

Another play of significance is The Marriage of Anansewa, written in 1975 by Efua Sutherland. The entire play is based upon an Akan oral tradition called Anansesem (folk tales). The main character of the play is Ananse (the spider). The qualities of Ananse are one of the most prevalent parts of the play. Ananse is cunning, selfish, has great insight into human and animal nature, is ambitious, eloquent, and resourceful. By putting too much of himself into everything that he does Ananse ruins each of his schemes and ends up poor. Ananse is used in the play as a kind of Everyman. He is written in an exaggerated sense in order to force the process of self-examination. Ananse is used as a way to spark a conversation for change in the society of anyone reading. The play tells of Ananse attempting to marry off his daughter Anansewa off to any of a selection of rich chiefs, or another sort of wealthy suitor simultaneously, in order to raise money. Eventually all the suitors come to his house at once, and he has to use all of his cunning to defuse the situation. The storyteller not only narrates but also enacts, reacts to, and comments on the action of the tale. Along with this, Mbuguous is used, Mbuguous is the name given to very specialized sect of Ghanaian theatre technique that allows for audience participation. The Mbuguous of this tale are songs that embellish the tale or comment on it. Spontaneity through this technique as well as improvisation are used enough to meet any standard of modern theatre.

==== Yoruba theatre ====
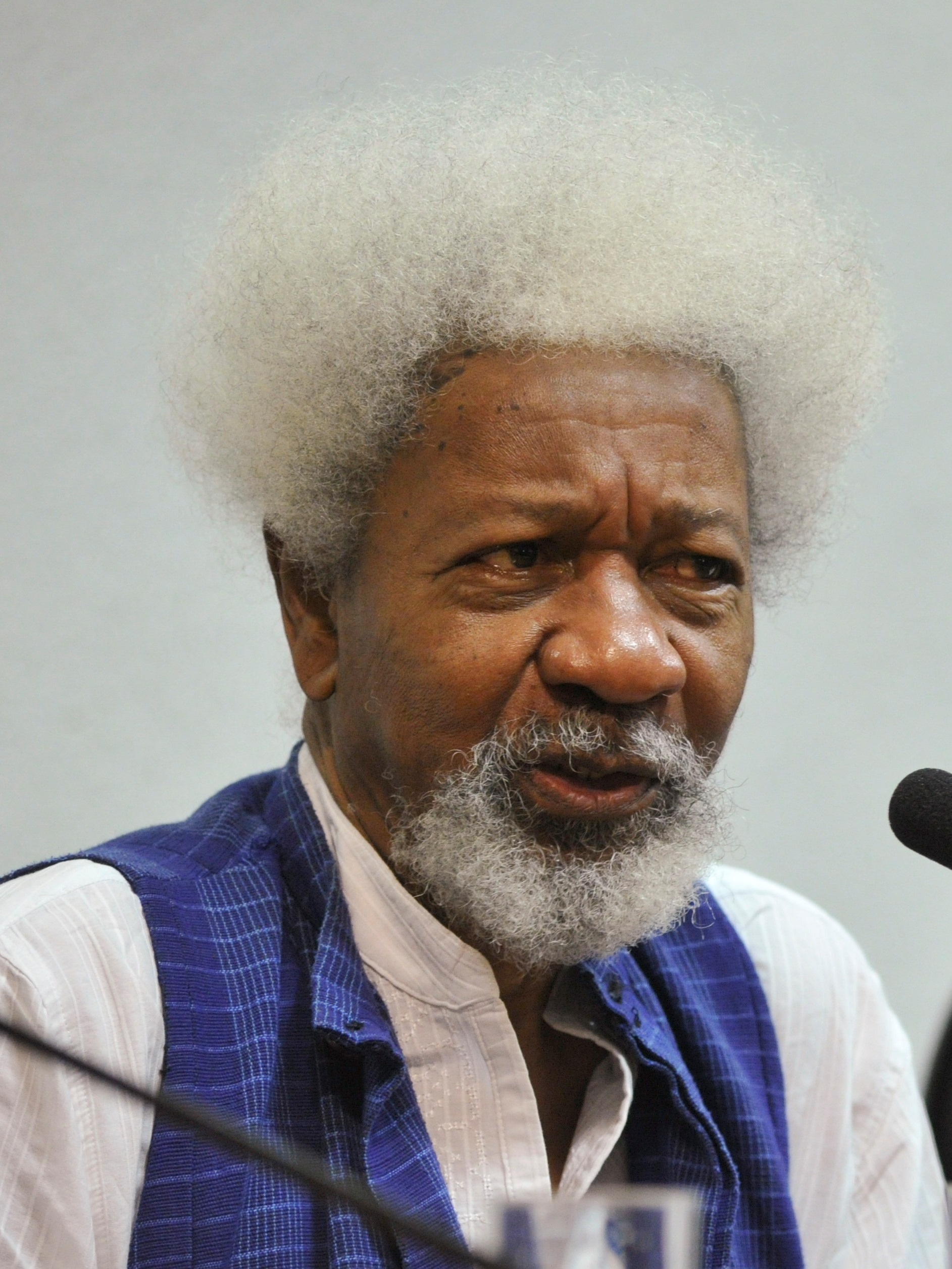
Wole Soyinka

In his pioneering study of Yoruba theatre, Joel Adedeji traced its origins to the masquerade of the Egungun (the "cult of the ancestor"). The traditional ceremony culminates in the essence of the masquerade where it is deemed that ancestors return to the world of the living to visit their descendants. In addition to its origin in ritual, Yoruba theatre can be "traced to the 'theatrogenic' nature of a number of the deities in the Yoruba pantheon, such as Obatala the arch divinity, Ogun the divinity of creativeness, as well as Iron and technology, and Sango the divinity of the storm", whose reverence is imbued "with drama and theatre and the symbolic overall relevance in terms of its relative interpretation."

The Aláàrìnjó theatrical tradition sprang from the Egungun masquerade in the 16th century. The Aláàrìnjó was a troupe of traveling performers whose masked forms carried an air of mystique. They created short, satirical scenes that drew on a number of established stereotypical characters. Their performances utilised mime, music and acrobatics. The Aláàrìnjó tradition influenced the popular traveling theatre, which was the most prevalent and highly developed form of theatre in Nigeria from the 1950s to the 1980s. In the 1990s, the popular traveling theatre moved into television and film and now gives live performances only rarely.

"Total theatre" also developed in Nigeria in the 1950s. It utilised non-Naturalistic techniques, surrealistic physical imagery, and exercised a flexible use of language. Playwrights writing in the mid-1970s made use of some of these techniques, but articulated them with "a radical appreciation of the problems of society."

Traditional performance modes have strongly influenced the major figures in contemporary Nigerian theatre. The work of Hubert Ogunde (sometimes referred to as the "father of contemporary Yoruban theatre") was informed by the Aláàrìnjó tradition and Egungun masquerades. Wole Soyinka, who is "generally recognized as Africa's greatest living playwright", gives the divinity Ogun a complex metaphysical significance in his work. In his essay "The Fourth Stage" (1973), Soyinka contrasts Yoruba drama with classical Athenian drama, relating both to the 19th-century German philosopher Friedrich Nietzsche's analysis of the latter in The Birth of Tragedy (1872). Ogun, he argues, is "a totality of the Dionysian, Apollonian and Promethean virtues."

The proponents of the travelling theatre in Nigeria include Duro Ladipo and Moses Olaiya (a popular comic act). These practitioners contributed much to the field of African theatre during the period of mixture and experimentation of the indigenous with the Western theatre.

=== African Diaspora theatre ===
==== African-American theatre ====
The history of African-American theatre has a dual origin. The first is rooted in local theatre where African Americans performed in cabins and parks. Their performances (folk tales, songs, music, and dance) were rooted in the African culture before being influenced by the American environment. After seeing this American environment African-American theatre slowly started to adapt their shows and add certain aspects of theatre that we know of today like scripts and staging to complement the things that they already had (folk tales, songs music, and dance). African Grove Theatre was the first African-American theatre established in 1821 by William Henry Brown. This was unfortunately a short lived establishment due to protests, noise complaints, racism, assault, and many other things. But in his theatre he did many productions of Shakespeare but he also made his own play, The Drama of King Shotaway which was the first of many playwrights to write plays about topics such as slavery and resistance, but this "surge" of playwriting and plays didn't start happening till about a century later, in the 1930s. Though he no longer had a theatre, he still continued with his plays by making an acting troupe named African Theatre (acting troupe) that moved quite often to escape all of the assaults and fighting that came from those who did not want to see shows put on by African-Americans.

While African-American theatre was widely known in America due to the African Grove Theatre, there were many actors that made the theatre art style known internationally such as Ira Aldridge. He left America due to there not being a lot of opportunities after the short lived African Grove Theatre. In England, he made a name for himself by being the first black man to play lead roles in plays like Shakespeare. These lead roles were as Othello, Macbeth, King Lear, Hamlet, Richard III, Shylock, and Aaron the Moor. He helped popularize African-American theatre by being the one the break the color barrier of theatre and being the one of many famous actors of that time (including Hyers Sisters, Sissieretta Jones, and Aida Overton Walker) to speak against newly formed plays called the Minstrel show.

== Asian theatre ==
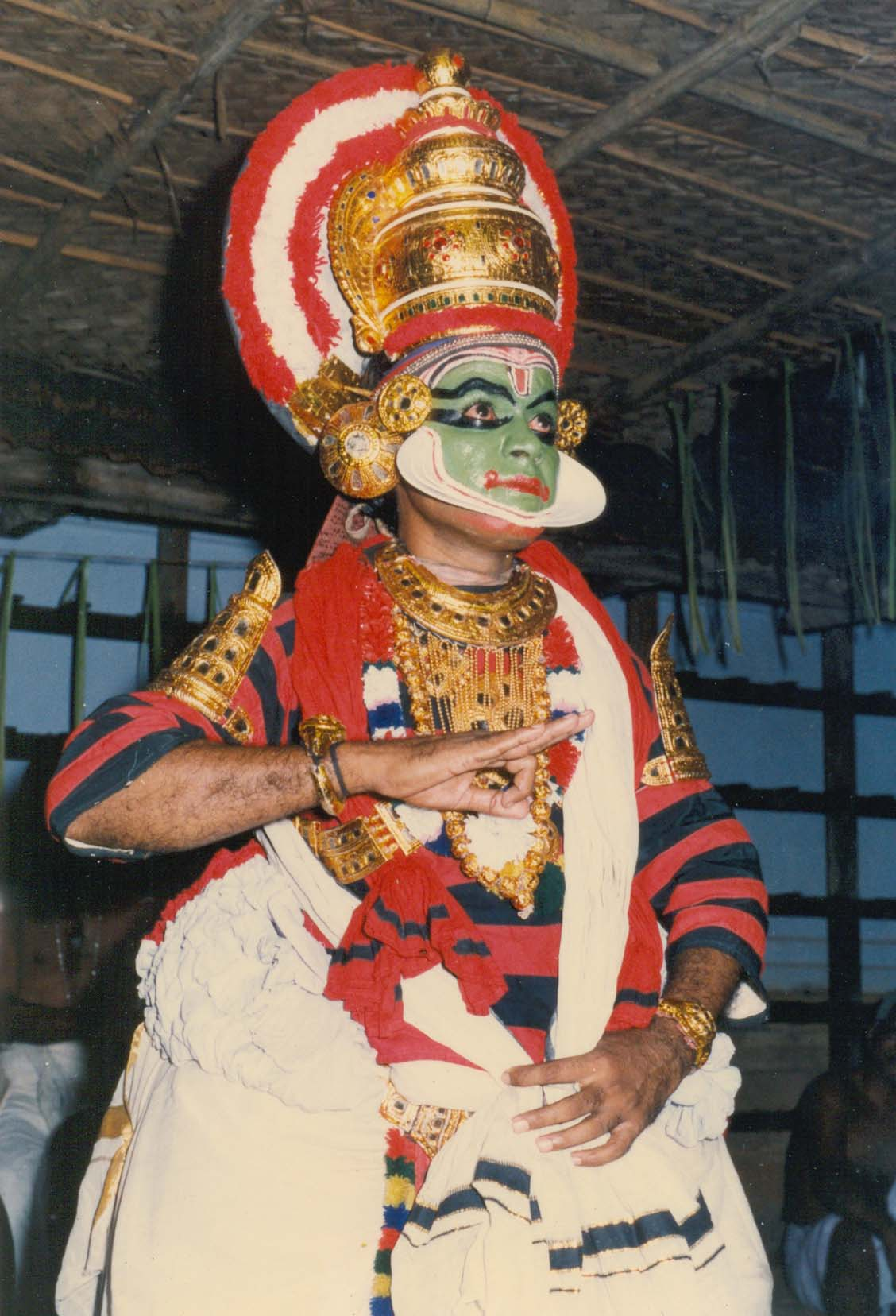
Mani Damodara Chakyar as King Udayana in Bhasa's Swapnavasavadattam Koodiyattam-the only surviving ancient Sanskrit theatre.

=== Indian theatre ===
==== Overview of Indian theatre ====
The earliest form of Indian theatre was the Sanskrit theatre. It emerged sometime between the 15th century BC and the 1st century and flourished between the 1st century and the 10th, which was a period of relative peace in the history of India during which hundreds of plays were written. Vedic texts such as the Rigveda provide evidence of drama plays being enacted during Yajna ceremonies. The dialogues mentioned in the texts range from one person monologue to three-person dialogue, for instance, the dialogue between Indra, Indrani and Vrishakapi. The dialogues are not only religious in their context but also secular for instance one rigvedic monologue is about a gambler whose life is ruined because of it and has estranged his wife and his parents also hate him. Panini in 5th century BC mentions a dramatic text Natasutra written by two Indian dramatists Shilalin and Krishashva. Patanjali also mentions the name of plays which have been lost such as kemsavadha and Balibandha. Sitabenga caves dating back to 3rd century BC and Khandagiri caves from 2nd century BC are the earliest examples of theatre architecture in India. With the Islamic conquests that began in the 10th and 11th centuries, theatre was discouraged or forbidden entirely. Later, in an attempt to re-assert indigenous values and ideas, village theatre was encouraged across the subcontinent, developing in a large number of regional languages from the 15th to the 19th centuries. Modern Indian theatre developed during the period of colonial rule under the British Empire, from the mid-19th century until the mid-20th.

==== Sanskrit theatre ====
The earliest-surviving fragments of Sanskrit drama date from the 1st century. The wealth of archaeological evidence from earlier periods offers no indication of the existence of a tradition of theatre. The Vedas (the earliest Indian literature, from between 1500 and 600 BC) contain no hint of it; although a small number of hymns are composed in a form of dialogue, the rituals of the Vedic period do not appear to have developed into theatre. The Mahābhāṣya by Patañjali contains the earliest reference to what may have been the seeds of Sanskrit drama. This treatise on grammar from 140 BC provides a feasible date for the beginnings of theatre in India.

However, although there are no surviving fragments of any drama prior to this date, it is possible that early Buddhist literature provides the earliest evidence for the existence of Indian theatre. The Pali suttas (ranging in date from the 5th to 3rd centuries BCE) refer to the existence of troupes of actors (led by a chief actor), who performed dramas on a stage. It is indicated that these dramas incorporated dance, but were listed as a distinct form of performance, alongside dancing, singing, and story recitations. (According to later Buddhist texts, King Bimbisara, a contemporary of Gautama Buddha, had a drama performed for another king. This would be as early as the 5th century BCE, but the event is only described in much later texts, from the 3rd-4th centuries CE.)

The major source of evidence for Sanskrit theatre is A Treatise on Theatre (Nātyaśāstra), a compendium whose date of composition is uncertain (estimates range from 200 BC to 200 AD) and whose authorship is attributed to Bharata Muni. The Treatise is the most complete work of dramaturgy in the ancient world. It addresses acting, dance, music, dramatic construction, architecture, costuming, make-up, props, the organisation of companies, the audience, competitions, and offers a mythological account of the origin of theatre. In doing so, it provides indications about the nature of actual theatrical practices. Sanskrit theatre was performed on sacred ground by priests who had been trained in the necessary skills (dance, music, and recitation) in a [hereditary process]. Its aim was both to educate and to entertain.

Under the patronage of royal courts, performers belonged to professional companies that were directed by a stage manager (sutradhara), who may also have acted. This task was thought of as being analogous to that of a puppeteer—the literal meaning of "sutradhara" is "holder of the strings or threads". The performers were trained rigorously in vocal and physical technique. There were no prohibitions against female performers; companies were all-male, all-female, and of mixed gender. Certain sentiments were considered inappropriate for men to enact, however, and were thought better suited to women. Some performers played character their own age, while others played those different from their own (whether younger or older). Of all the elements of theatre, the Treatise gives most attention to acting (abhinaya), which consists of two styles: realistic (lokadharmi) and conventional (natyadharmi), though the major focus is on the latter.

Its drama is regarded as the highest achievement of Sanskrit literature. It utilised stock characters, such as the hero (nayaka), heroine (nayika), or clown (vidusaka). Actors may have specialised in a particular type. Kālidāsa in the 1st century BC, is arguably considered to be ancient India's greatest Sanskrit dramatist. Three famous romantic plays written by Kālidāsa are the Mālavikāgnimitram (Mālavikā and Agnimitra), Vikramuurvashiiya (Pertaining to Vikrama and Urvashi), and Abhijñānaśākuntala (The Recognition of Shakuntala). The last was inspired by a story in the Mahabharata and is the most famous. It was the first to be translated into English and German. Śakuntalā (in English translation) influenced Goethe's Faust (1808–1832).

The next great Indian dramatist was Bhavabhuti (c. 7th century). He is said to have written the following three plays: Malati-Madhava, Mahaviracharita and Uttar Ramacharita. Among these three, the last two cover between them the entire epic of Ramayana. The powerful Indian emperor Harsha (606–648) is credited with having written three plays: the comedy Ratnavali, Priyadarsika, and the Buddhist drama Nagananda.

==== Traditional Indian theatre ====
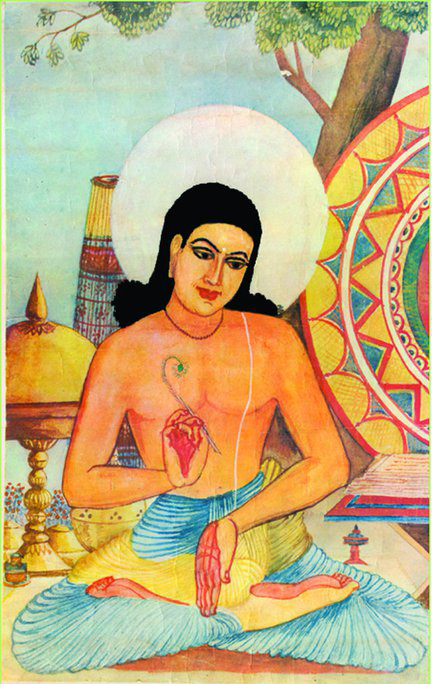
Sankardev

Kutiyattam is the only surviving specimen of the ancient Sanskrit theatre, thought to have originated around the beginning of the Common Era, and is officially recognised by UNESCO as a Masterpiece of the Oral and Intangible Heritage of Humanity. In addition, many forms of Indian folk theatre abound. Bhavai (strolling players) is a popular folk theatre form of Gujarat, said to have arisen in the 14th century AD. Bhaona and Ankiya Nats have been practicing in Assam since the early 16th century which were created and initiated by Mahapurusha Srimanta Sankardeva. Jatra has been popular in Bengal and its origin is traced to the Bhakti movement in the 16th century. Another folk theatre form popular in Haryana, Uttar Pradesh and Malwa region of Madhya Pradesh is Swang, which is dialogue-oriented rather than movement-oriented and is considered to have arisen in its present form in the late 18th – early 19th centuries. Yakshagana is a very popular theatre art in Karnataka and has existed under different names at least since the 16th century. It is semi-classical in nature and involves music and songs based on carnatic music, rich costumes, storylines based on the Mahabharata and Ramayana. It also employs spoken dialogue in-between its songs that gives it a folk art flavour. Kathakali is a form of dance-drama, characteristic of Kerala, that arose in the 17th century, developing from the temple-art plays Krishnanattam and Ramanattam.

==== Kathakali ====
Kathakali is a highly stylised classical Indian dance-drama noted for the attractive make-up of characters, elaborate costumes, detailed gestures, and well-defined body movements presented in tune with the anchor playback music and complementary percussion. It originated in the country's present-day state of Kerala during the 17th century and has developed over the years with improved looks, refined gestures and added themes besides more ornate singing and precise drumming.

==== Modern Indian theatre ====
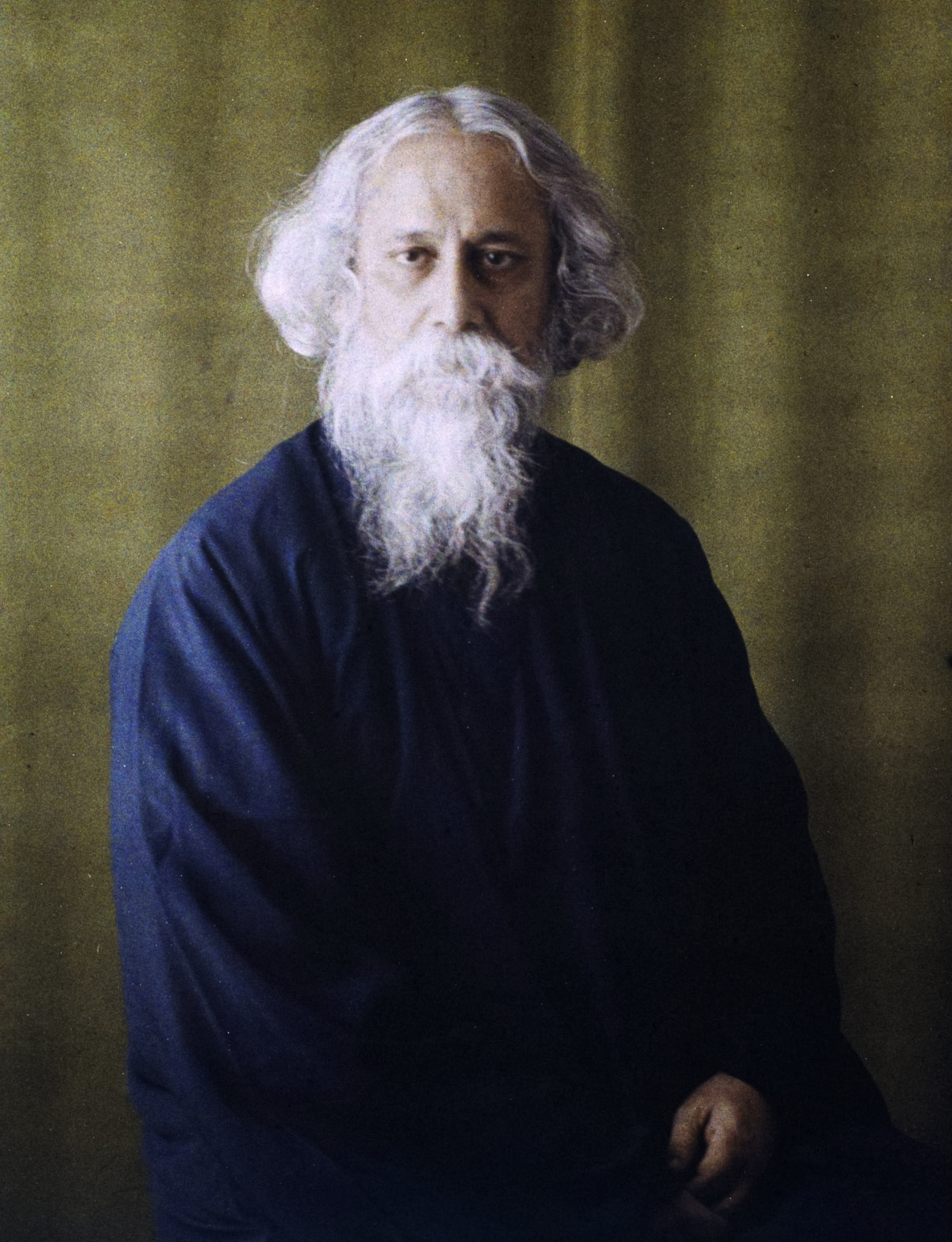
Rabindranath Tagore

Rabindranath Tagore was a pioneering modern playwright who wrote plays noted for their exploration and questioning of nationalism, identity, spiritualism and material greed. His plays are written in Bengali and include Chitra (Chitrangada, 1892), The King of the Dark Chamber (Raja, 1910), The Post Office (Dakghar, 1913), and Red Oleander (Raktakarabi, 1924).

Another pioneering playwright in Bengali Theatre, who was deservedly the successor of Rabindranath Tagore, was Natyaguru Nurul Momen. While his predecessor, Tagore, ushered in modernism in Bengali Literature in the 19th Century; Nurul Momen held the baton of modernism handed down by him & took it to height of World class Theatre in the 20th Century, through his debut plays, "Rupantar" & Nemesis (Momen play).

=== Chinese theatre ===
==== Shang theatre ====
There are references to theatrical entertainments in China as early as 1500 BC during the Shang dynasty; they often involved music, clowning and acrobatic displays.

==== Han and Tang theatre ====
During the Han dynasty, shadow puppetry first emerged as a recognized form of theatre in China. There were two distinct forms of shadow puppetry, Cantonese southern and Pekingese northern. The two styles were differentiated by the method of making the puppets and the positioning of the rods on the puppets, as opposed to the type of play performed by the puppets. Both styles generally performed plays depicting great adventure and fantasy, rarely was this very stylized form of theatre used for political propaganda. Cantonese shadow puppets were the larger of the two. They were built using thick leather which created more substantial shadows. Symbolic color was also very prevalent; a black face represented honesty, a red one bravery. The rods used to control Cantonese puppets were attached perpendicular to the puppets' heads. Thus, they were not seen by the audience when the shadow was created. Pekingese puppets were more delicate and smaller. They were created out of thin, translucent leather usually taken from the belly of a donkey. They were painted with vibrant paints, thus they cast a very colorful shadow. The thin rods which controlled their movements were attached to a leather collar at the neck of the puppet. The rods ran parallel to the bodies of the puppet then turned at a ninety degree angle to connect to the neck. While these rods were visible when the shadow was cast, they laid outside the shadow of the puppet; thus they did not interfere with the appearance of the figure. The rods attached at the necks to facilitate the use of multiple heads with one body. When the heads were not being used, they were stored in a muslin book or fabric lined box. The heads were always removed at night. This was in keeping with the old superstition that if left intact, the puppets would come to life at night. Some puppeteers went so far as to store the heads in one book and the bodies in another, to further reduce the possibility of reanimating puppets. Shadow puppetry is said to have reached its highest point of artistic development in the 11th century before becoming a tool of the government.

The Tang dynasty is sometimes known as 'The Age of 1000 Entertainments'. During this era, Emperor Xuanzong formed an acting school known as the Children of the Pear Garden to produce a form of drama that was primarily musical.

==== Song and Yuan theatre ====
In the Song dynasty, there were many popular plays involving acrobatics and music. These developed in the Yuan dynasty into a more sophisticated form with a four- or five-act structure.

Yuan drama spread across China and diversified into numerous regional forms, the best known of which is Beijing Opera, which is still popular today.

=== Indonesian theatre ===
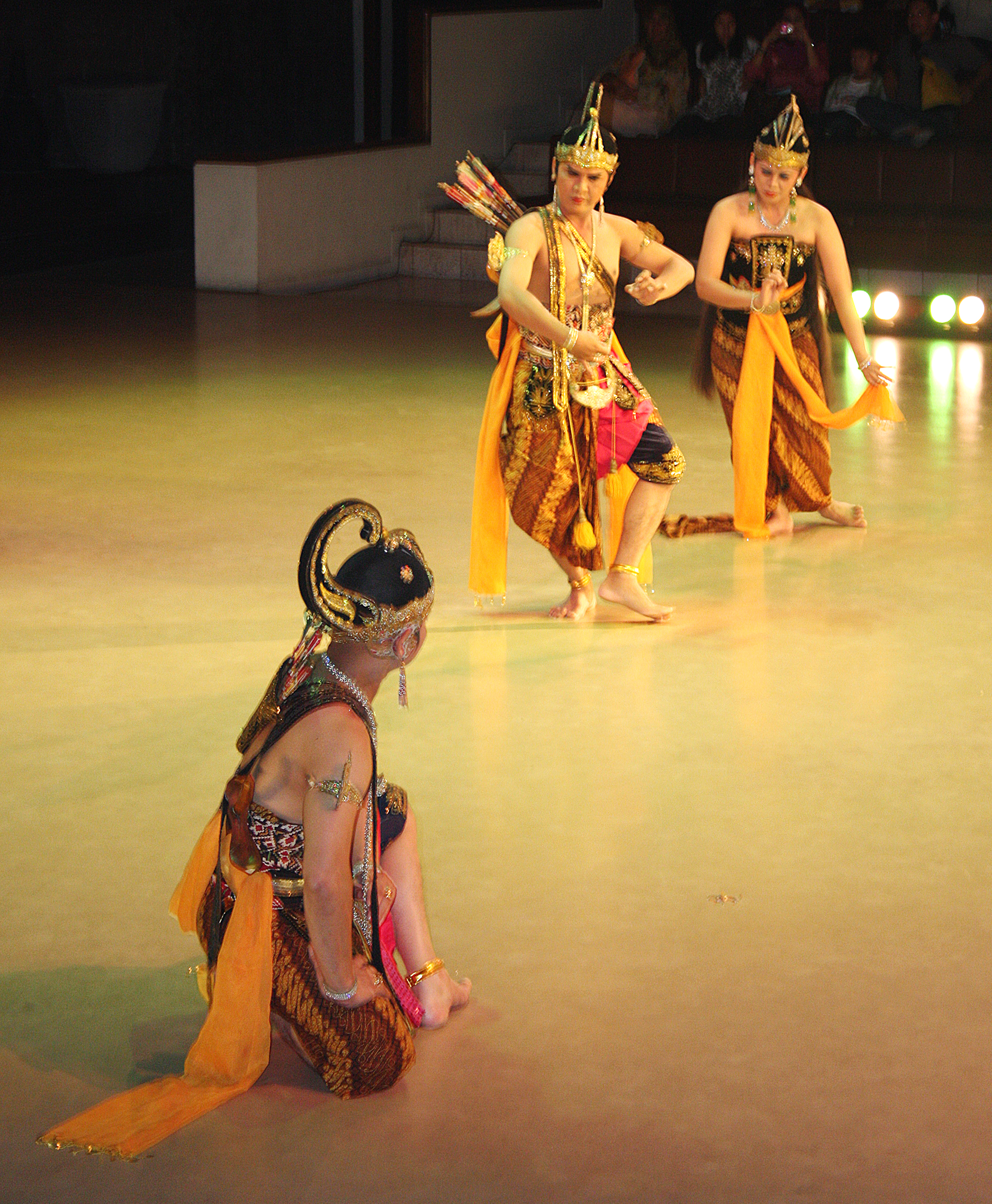
Wayang Wong theatre performance near Prambanan temple complex

Indonesian theatre has become an important part of local culture, theater performances in Indonesia have been developed for hundreds of years. Most of Indonesia's older theatre forms are linked directly to local literary traditions (oral and written). The prominent puppet theatres — wayang golek (wooden rod-puppet play) of the Sundanese and wayang kulit (leather shadow-puppet play) of the Javanese and Balinese—draw much of their repertoire from indigenized versions of the Ramayana and Mahabharata. These tales also provide source material for the wayang wong (human theatre) of Java and Bali, which uses actors. Wayang wong is a type of classical Javanese dance theatrical performance with themes taken from episodes of the Ramayana or Mahabharata. The bas relief panels on the 9th-century of Prambanan temple show episodes of the Ramayana epic. The adaptation of Mahabharata episodes has been integrated in the Javanese literature tradition since the Kahuripan and Kediri era, with notable examples such as Arjunawiwaha, composed by Mpu Kanwa in the 11th century. The Penataran temple in East Java depicts themes from the Ramayana and Mahabharata in its bas reliefs. Wayang wong was a performance in the style of wayang kulit (the shadow theatre of Central Java) wherein actors and actresses took the puppets' roles. The first written reference to the form is on the stone inscription Wimalarama from East Java dated 930 CE. The genre is currently done in masked and unmasked variations in Central Java, Bali, and Cirebon, as well as in Sundanese (West Java).

=== Khmer theatre ===
In Cambodia, at the ancient capital Angkor Wat, stories from the Indian epics Ramayana and Mahabharata have been carved on the walls of temples and palaces.

=== Thai theatre ===
In Thailand, it has been a tradition from the Middle Ages to stage plays based on plots drawn from Indian epics. In particular, the theatrical version of Thailand's national epic Ramakien, a version of the Indian Ramayana, remains popular in Thailand even today.

=== Philippine theatre ===
During the 333-year reign of the Spanish government, they introduced into the islands the Catholic religion and the Spanish way of life, which gradually merged with the indigenous culture to form the “lowland folk culture” now shared by the major ethnolinguistic groups. Today, the dramatic forms introduced or influenced by Spain continue to live in rural areas all over the archipelago. These forms include the komedya, the playlets, the sinakulo, the sarswela, and the drama. In recent years, some of these forms have been revitalized to make them more responsive to the conditions and needs of a developing nation.

=== Japanese theatre ===
==== Noh ====
During the 14th century, there were small companies of actors in Japan who performed short, sometimes vulgar comedies. A director of one of these companies, Kan'ami (1333–1384), had a son, Zeami Motokiyo (1363–1443) who was considered one of the finest child actors in Japan. When Kan'ami's company performed for Ashikaga Yoshimitsu (1358–1408), the Shōgun of Japan, he implored Zeami to have a court education for his arts. After Zeami succeeded his father, he continued to perform and adapt his style into what is today Noh. A mixture of pantomime and vocal acrobatics, this style has fascinated the Japanese for hundreds of years.

==== Bunraku ====
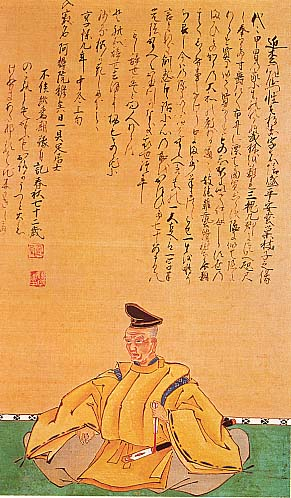
Chikamatsu Monzaemon

Japan, after a long period of civil wars and political disarray, was unified and at peace primarily due to shōgun Tokugawa Ieyasu (1543–1616). However, alarmed at increasing Christian growth, he cut off contact from Japan to Europe and China and outlawed Christianity. When peace did come, a flourish of cultural influence and growing merchant class demanded its own entertainment. The first form of theatre to flourish was Ningyō jōruri (commonly referred to as Bunraku). The founder of and main contributor to Ningyō jōruri, Chikamatsu Monzaemon (1653–1725), turned his form of theatre into a true art form. Ningyō jōruri is a highly stylized form of theatre using puppets, today about 1/3d the size of a human. The men who control the puppets train their entire lives to become master puppeteers, when they can then operate the puppet's head and right arm and choose to show their faces during the performance. The other puppeteers, controlling the less important limbs of the puppet, cover themselves and their faces in a black suit, to imply their invisibility. The dialogue is handled by a single person, who uses varied tones of voice and speaking manners to simulate different characters. Chikamatsu wrote thousands of plays during his career, most of which are still used today. They wore masks instead of elaborate makeup. Masks define their gender, personality, and moods the actor is in.

==== Kabuki ====
Kabuki began shortly after Bunraku, legend has it by an actress named Okuni, who lived around the end of the 16th century. Most of Kabuki's material came from Nõ and Bunraku, and its erratic dance-type movements are also an effect of Bunraku. However, Kabuki is less formal and more distant than Nõ, yet very popular among the Japanese public. Actors are trained in many varied things including dancing, singing, pantomime, and even acrobatics. Kabuki was first performed by young girls, then by young boys, and by the end of the 16th century, Kabuki companies consisted of all men. The men who portrayed women on stage were specifically trained to elicit the essence of a woman in their subtle movements and gestures.

==== Butoh ====
Butoh is the collective name for a diverse range of activities, techniques and motivations for dance, performance, or movement inspired by the Ankoku-Butoh (暗黒舞踏, ankoku butō) movement. It typically involves playful and grotesque imagery, taboo topics, extreme or absurd environments, and is traditionally performed in white body makeup with slow hyper-controlled motion, with or without an audience. There is no set style, and it may be purely conceptual with no movement at all. Its origins have been attributed to Japanese dance legends Tatsumi Hijikata and Kazuo Ohno. Butoh appeared first in Japan following World War II and specifically after student riots. The roles of authority were now subject to challenge and subversion. It also appeared as a reaction against the contemporary dance scene in Japan, which Hijikata felt was based on the one hand on imitating the West and on the other on imitating the Noh. He critiqued the current state of dance as overly superficial.

=== Turkish theatre ===
1st mention of theatre plays in Ottoman Empire connected with appear of Spanish Jews there in the end of fifteenth - sixteenth centuries. Later other minorities, like Roma, Greeks, and Armenian became involved in the field. Afterwards Turkish equivalent of the Italian Commedia dell'arte - the Orta oyunu became very popular all over the Empire.

=== Persian and Iranian theatre ===
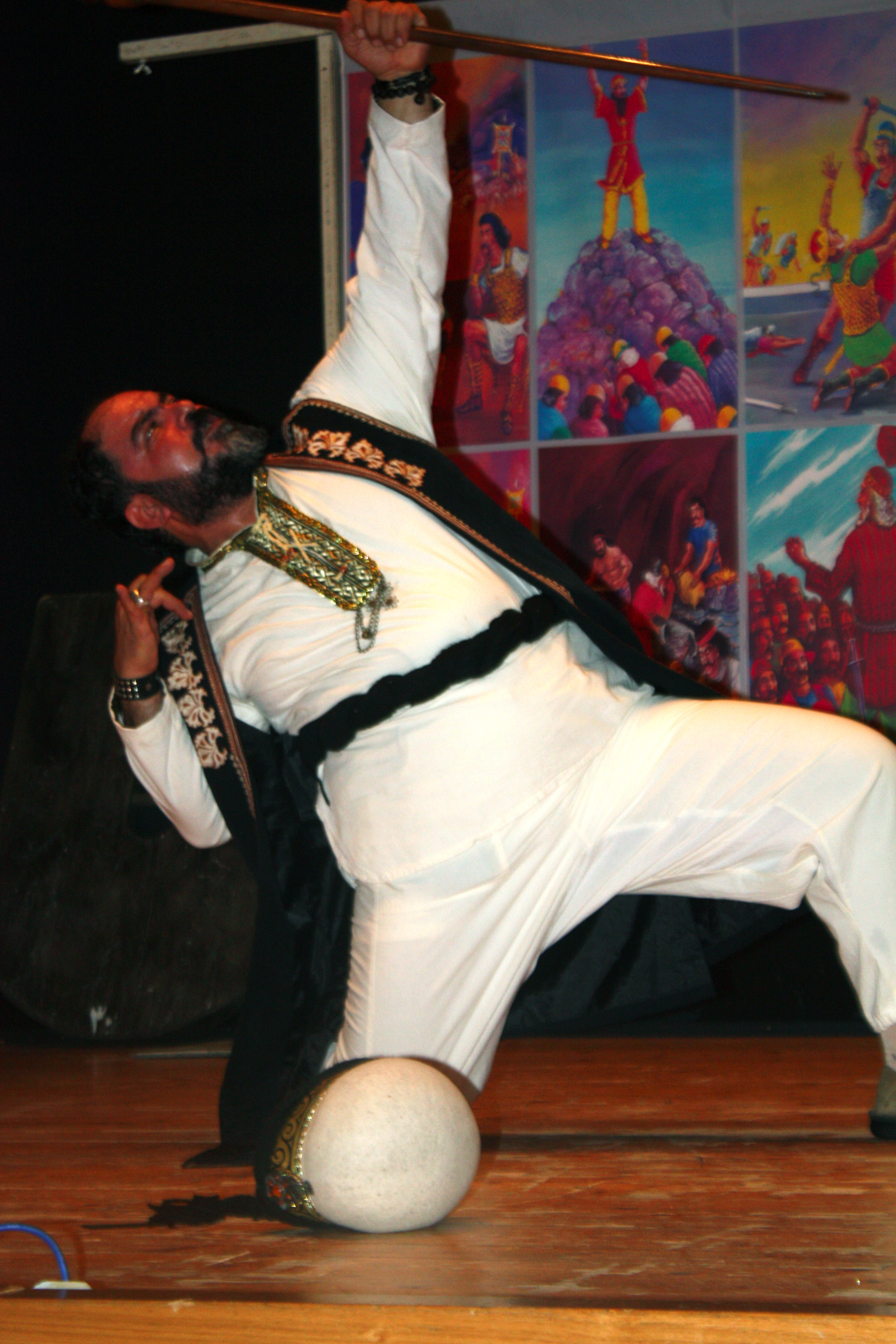
Iranian actor doing Naqqāli

==== Persian theater ====
Persian theater (Persian: تئاتر ایرانی) goes back to antiquity. The first initiation of theater and phenomena of acting can be traced in ceremonial theaters to glorify national heroes and legends and to humiliate the enemy, as in the classics "Soug Sivash" and "Mogh Koshi" (Megakhouni). Ancient Persian theatre and dance was significantly researched by the Greek historian Herodotus of Halikarnassos, who lived during the Persian rule in Greece. In his work Book IX (Calliope), he describes the history of Asian empires and also the Persian wars until 478 BC.

==== Iranian theater ====
The contemporary theatre seen today in Iran is largely alike Western traditions of performance that developed during the twentieth century. The most influential among these are modernism, Theatre of the Absurd, the poor theater, and postmodernism. While contemporary Iranian theatre builds off these movements, modern theatre artists have created a unique, culturally-specific style of theatre that blends Western styles with traditional modes of Persian performance.

=== Medieval Islamic theatre ===
The most popular forms of theatre in the medieval Islamic world were puppet theatre (which included hand puppets, shadow plays and marionette productions) and live passion plays known as ta'ziyehs, in which actors re-enact episodes from Muslim history. In particular, Shia Islamic plays revolved around the shaheed (martyrdom) of Ali's sons Hasan ibn Ali and Husayn ibn Ali. Secular plays known as akhraja were recorded in medieval adab literature, though they were less common than puppetry and ta'ziya theatre.

== See also ==
- Antitheatricality
- The Cambridge History of British Theatre
- Development of musical theatre
- History of art
- History of dance
- History of figure skating
- History of film
- History of literature
- History of opera
- History of professional wrestling
- History of television
- Play (theatre)
- Radio drama
- Pierre Beaumesnil

== Sources ==
- Adejeji, Joel. 1969. "Traditional Yoruba Theatre." African Arts 3.1 (Spring): 60–63. JSTOR 3334461
- Banham, Martin, ed. 1995. The Cambridge Guide to Theatre. Rev. ed. Cambridge: Cambridge UP. ISBN 978-0-521-43437-9.
- Banham, Martin, Errol Hill, and George Woodyard, eds. 2005. The Cambridge Guide to African and Caribbean Theatre. Cambridge: Cambridge UP. ISBN 978-0-521-61207-4.
- Baumer, Rachel Van M., and James R. Brandon, eds. 1981. Sanskrit Theatre in Performance. Delhi: Motilal Banarsidass, 1993. ISBN 978-81-208-0772-3.
- Beacham, Richard C. 1996. The Roman Theatre and Its Audience. Cambridge, MA: Harvard UP. ISBN 978-0-674-77914-3.
- Benedetti, Jean. 1999. Stanislavski: His Life and Art. Revised edition. Original edition published in 1988. London: Methuen. ISBN 0-413-52520-1.
- ––. 2005. The Art of the Actor: The Essential History of Acting, From Classical Times to the Present Day. London: Methuen. ISBN 0-413-77336-1.
- Brandon, James R. 1981. Introduction. In Baumer and Brandon (1981, xvii–xx).
- ––, ed. 1997. The Cambridge Guide to Asian Theatre. 2nd, rev. ed. Cambridge: Cambridge UP. ISBN 978-0-521-58822-5.
- Brinton, Crane, John B Christopher, and Robert Lee Wolff. 1981. Civilization in the West: Part 1 Prehistory to 1715. 4th ed. Englewood Cliffs, NJ: Prentice-Hall. ISBN 978-0-13-134924-7.
- Brockett, Oscar G. and Franklin J. Hildy. 2003. History of the Theatre. Ninth edition, International edition. Boston: Allyn and Bacon. ISBN 0-205-41050-2.
- Brown, Andrew. 1995. "Ancient Greece." In Banham (1995, 441–447).
- Cartledge, Paul. 1997. "'Deep Plays': Theatre as Process in Greek Civic Life." In Easterling (1997, 3–35).
- Cohen, Robert, and Donovan Sherman. 2020. "Chapter 7: Theatre Traditions." Theatre: Brief Edition. Twelfth ed. New York, NY. ISBN 978-1-260-05738-6. OCLC 1073038874.
- Counsell, Colin. 1996. Signs of Performance: An Introduction to Twentieth-Century Theatre. London and New York: Routledge. ISBN 978-0-415-10643-6.
- Davidson, John. 2005. "Theatrical Production." In Gregory (2005, 194–211).
- Duffy, Eamon. 1992. The Stripping of the Altars: Traditional Religion in England, 1400–1580. New Haven: Yale UP. ISBN 978-0-300-06076-8.
- Easterling, P. E., ed. 1997. The Cambridge Companion to Greek Tragedy. Cambridge Companions to Literature ser. Cambridge: Cambridge UP. ISBN 0-521-42351-1.
- Falossi, F. and Mastropasqua, F. "L'Incanto Della Maschera." Vol. 1 Prinp Editore, Torino:2014 www.prinp.com ISBN 978-88-97677-50-5
- Finley, Moses I. 1991. The Ancient Greeks: An Introduction to their Life and Thought. London: Penguin. ISBN 978-0-14-013707-1.
- Goldhill, Simon. 1997. "The Audience of Athenian Tragedy." In Easterling (1997, 54–68).
- ––. 1999. "Programme Notes." In Goldhill and Osborne (2004, 1–29).
- ––. 2008. "Generalizing About Tragedy." In Felski (2008b, 45–65).
- Goldhill, Simon, and Robin Osborne, eds. 2004. Performance Culture and Athenian Democracy. New edition. Cambridge: Cambridge UP. ISBN 978-0-521-60431-4.
- Gregory, Justina, ed. 2005. A Companion to Greek Tragedy. Blackwell Companions to the Ancient World ser. Malden, MA and Oxford: Blackwell. ISBN 1-4051-7549-4.
- Grimsted, David. 1968. Melodrama Unveiled: American Theatre and Culture, 1800–50. Chicago: U of Chicago P. ISBN 978-0-226-30901-9.
- Gurr, Andrew. 1992. The Shakespearean Stage 1574–1642. Third ed. Cambridge: Cambridge University Press. ISBN 0-521-42240-X.
- Hume, Robert D. 1976. The Development of English Drama in the Late Seventeenth Century. Oxford: Clarendon Press. ISBN 978-0-19-811799-5.
- Janko, Richard, trans. 1987. Poetics with Tractatus Coislinianus, Reconstruction of Poetics II and the Fragments of the On Poets. By Aristotle. Cambridge: Hackett. ISBN 0-87220-033-7.
- Kovacs, David. 2005. "Text and Transmission." In Gregory (2005, 379–393).
- Ley, Graham. 2006. A Short Introduction to the Ancient Greek Theater. Rev. ed. Chicago and London: U of Chicago P. ISBN 978-0-226-47761-9.
- –. 2007. The Theatricality of Greek Tragedy: Playing Space and Chorus. Chicago and London: U of Chicago P. ISBN 978-0-226-47757-2.
- McCullough, Christopher, ed. 1998. Theatre Praxis: Teaching Drama Through Practice. New Directions in Theatre Ser. London: Macmillan. ISBN 978-0-333-64996-1. New York: St Martin's P. ISBN 978-0-312-21611-5.
- ––. 1996. Theatre and Europe (1957–1996). Intellect European Studies ser. Exeter: Intellect. ISBN 978-1-871516-82-1.
- McDonald, Marianne. 2003. The Living Art of Greek Tragedy. Bloomington: Indiana UP. ISBN 978-0-253-21597-0.
- McKay, John P., Bennett D. Hill, and John Buckler. 1996. A History of World Societies. 4th ed. Boston: Houghton Mifflin. ISBN 978-0-395-75377-4.
- Milhous, Judith 1979. Thomas Betterton and the Management of Lincoln's Inn Fields 1695–1708. Carbondale, Illinois: Southern Illinois UP. ISBN 978-0-8093-0906-1.
- Milling, Jane, and Graham Ley. 2001. Modern Theories of Performance: From Stanislavski to Boal. Basingstoke, Hampshire and New York: Palgrave. ISBN 978-0-333-77542-4.
- Moreh, Shmuel. 1986. "Live Theater in Medieval Islam." In Studies in Islamic History and Civilization in Honour of Professor David Ayalon. Ed. Moshe Sharon. Cana, Leiden: Brill. 565–601. ISBN 978-965-264-014-7.
- Mortimer, Ian. 2012. "The Time-Traveller's Guide To Elizabethan England." London: The Bodley Head. ISBN 978-1-84792-114-7.
- Munby, Julian, Richard Barber, and Richard Brown. 2007. Edward III's Round Table at Windsor: The House of the Round Table and the Windsor Festival of 1344. Arthurian Studies ser. Woodbridge: Boydell P. ISBN 978-1-84383-391-8.
- Noret, Joël. 2008. "Between Authenticity and Nostalgia: The Making of a Yoruba Tradition in Southern Benin." African Arts 41.4 (Winter): 26–31.
- Pavis, Patrice. 1998. Dictionary of the Theatre: Terms, Concepts, and Analysis. Trans. Christine Shantz. Toronto and Buffalo: U of Toronto P. ISBN 978-0-8020-8163-6.
- Pelling, Christopher. 2005. "Tragedy, Rhetoric, and Performance Culture." In Gregory (2005, 83–102).
- Rehm, Rush. 1992. Greek Tragic Theatre. Theatre Production Studies ser. London and New York: Routledge. ISBN 0-415-11894-8.
- Richmond, Farley. 1995. "India." In Banham (1995, 516–525).
- Richmond, Farley P., Darius L. Swann, and Phillip B. Zarrilli, eds. 1993. Indian Theatre: Traditions of Performance. U of Hawaii P. ISBN 978-0-8248-1322-2.
- Soyinka, Wole. 1973. "The Fourth Stage: Through the Mysteries of Ogun to the Origin of Yoruba Tragedy." In The Morality of Art: Essays Presented to G. Wilson Knight by his Colleagues and Friends. Ed. Douglas William Jefferson. London: Routledge and Kegan Paul. 119–134. ISBN 978-0-7100-6280-2.
- Styan, J. L. 2000. Drama: A Guide to the Study of Plays. New York: Peter Lang. ISBN 978-0-8204-4489-5.
- Taplin, Oliver. 2003. Greek Tragedy in Action. Second edition. London and New York: Routledge. ISBN 978-0-7486-1987-0.
- Taxidou, Olga. 2004. Tragedy, Modernity and Mourning. Edinburgh: Edinburgh UP. ISBN 0-7486-1987-9.
- Thornbrough, Emma Lou. 1996. The Ancient Greeks. Acton, MA: Copley. ISBN 978-0-87411-860-5.
- Tsitsiridis, Stavros, "Greek Mime in the Roman Empire (P.Oxy. 413: Charition and Moicheutria", Logeion 1 (2011) 184–232.
- Vernant, Jean-Pierre, and Pierre Vidal-Naquet. 1988. Myth and Tragedy in Ancient Greece. Trans. Janet Lloyd. New York: Zone Books, 1990.
- Walton, J. Michael. 1997. Introduction. In Plays VI. By Euripides. Methuen Classical Greek Dramatists ser. London: Methuen. vii–xxii. ISBN 0-413-71650-3.
- Williams, Raymond. 1966. Modern Tragedy. London: Chatto & Windus. ISBN 0-7011-1260-3.
- Zarrilli, Phillip B. 1984. The Kathakali Complex: Actor, Performance and Structure. [S.l.]: South Asia Books. ISBN 978-0-391-03029-9.
