= Konstantin Stanislavski =

Russian actor and theatre director (1863–1938)

Konstantin Stanislavski Константин Станиславский
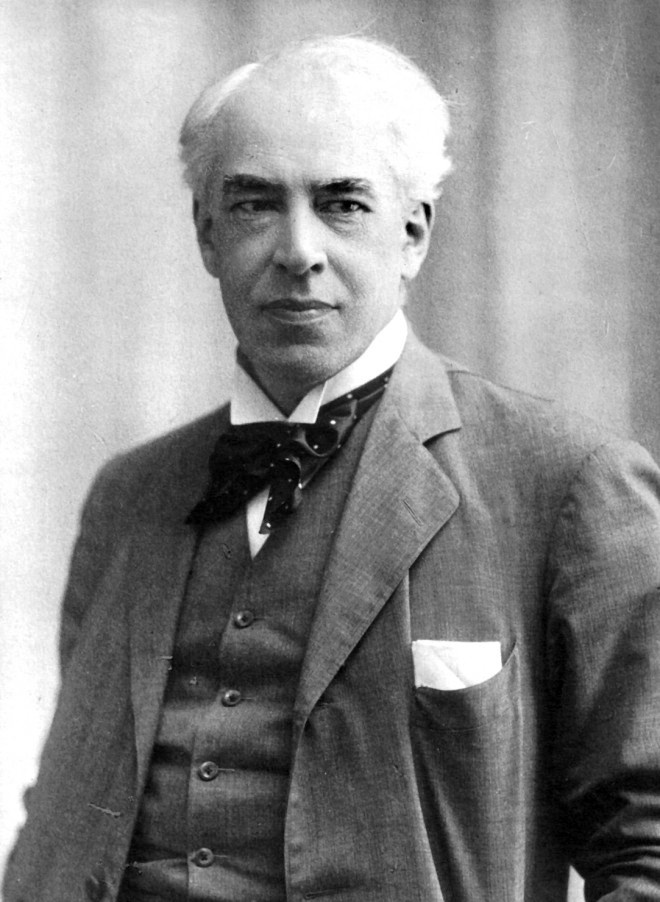
- Born: Konstantin Sergeyevich Alekseyev; 17 January [O.S. 5 January] 1863 (Note: For dates before the Soviet state's switch from the Julian calendar to the Gregorian calendar in February 1918, this article gives the date in the New Style (Gregorian) date-format first, followed by the same day in the Old Style (Julian) date-format (which appears in square brackets and slightly smaller); this is to facilitate comparison between primary and secondary sources. The difference between the two is 12 days for Julian dates before 1 March 1900 [Gregorian 14 March] and 13 days for Julian dates on or after 1 March 1900. Thus, Stanislavski was born on 17 January according to the Gregorian calendar that is in use today, while his birthday was 5 January according to the Julian calendar that was in use at the time. For more information on the difference between the two systems, see the article Adoption of the Gregorian calendar. Dates after 1 February 1918 are presented as normal.); Moscow, Russia
- Died: 7 August 1938 (aged 75); Moscow, Soviet Union
- Resting place: Novodevichy Cemetery, Moscow
- Occupations: Actor; theatre director; theatre theorist
- Spouse: Maria Lilina (m. 1889)
- Writing career
- Notable works: An Actor's Work; An Actor's Work on a Role; My Life in Art
- Movements: Naturalism; symbolism; psychological realism; socialist realism
- Known for: Founder of the MAT; Stanislavski's system

Konstantin Sergeyevich Stanislavski (Note: Stanislavski's first name is also transliterated as Constantin, while his surname is also transliterated as Stanislavsky and Stanislavskii. As discussed below, Stanislavski is a stage name.) (/stænɪˈslævski/; Russian: Константин Сергеевич Станиславский, IPA: [kənstɐnʲˈtʲin sʲɪrˈɡʲejɪvʲɪtɕ stənʲɪˈslafskʲɪj]; né Alekseyev; (Note: Russian: Алексеев) 17 January [O.S. 5 January] 1863 – 7 August 1938) was a seminal Russian and Soviet theatre practitioner. He was widely recognized as an outstanding character actor, and the many productions that he directed garnered him a reputation as one of the leading theatre directors of his generation. His principal fame and influence, however, rests on his "system" of actor training, preparation, and rehearsal technique.

Stanislavski (his stage name) performed and directed as an amateur until the age of 33, when he co-founded the world-famous Moscow Art Theatre (MAT) company with Vladimir Nemirovich-Danchenko, following a legendary 18-hour discussion. Its influential tours of Europe (1906) and the US (1923–24), and its landmark productions of The Seagull (1898) and Hamlet (1911–12), established his reputation and opened new possibilities for the art of the theatre. By means of the MAT, Stanislavski was instrumental in promoting the new Russian drama of his day—principally the work of Anton Chekhov, Maxim Gorky, and Mikhail Bulgakov—to audiences in Moscow and around the world; he also staged acclaimed productions of a wide range of classical Russian and European plays.

He collaborated with the director and designer Edward Gordon Craig and was formative in the development of several other major practitioners, including Vsevolod Meyerhold (whom Stanislavski considered his "sole heir in the theatre"), Yevgeny Vakhtangov, and Michael Chekhov. At the MAT's 30th anniversary celebrations in 1928, a massive heart attack on-stage put an end to his acting career (though he waited until the curtain fell before seeking medical assistance). He continued to direct, teach, and write about acting until his death a few weeks before the publication of the first volume of his life's great work, the acting manual An Actor's Work (1938). He was awarded the Order of the Red Banner of Labour and the Order of Lenin and was the first to be granted the title of People's Artist of the USSR.

Stanislavski wrote that "there is nothing more tedious than an actor's biography" and that "actors should be banned from talking about themselves". At the request of a US publisher, however, he reluctantly agreed to write his autobiography, My Life in Art (first published in English in 1924 and a revised, Russian-language edition in 1926), though its account of his artistic development is not always accurate. Three English-language biographies have been published: David Magarshack's Stanislavsky: A Life (1950); Jean Benedetti's Stanislavski: His Life and Art (1988, revised and expanded 1999). and Nikolai M Gorchakov's "Stanislavsky Directs" (1954). (Note: This article draws substantially on these books.) An out-of-print English translation of Elena Poliakova's 1977 Russian biography of Stanislavski was also published in 1982.

== Overview of the system ==
Stanislavski subjected his acting and direction to a rigorous process of artistic self-analysis and reflection. His system (Note: Stanislavski began developing a "grammar" of acting in 1906; his initial choice to call it his System struck him as too dogmatic, so he wrote it as his "system" (without the capital letter and in inverted commas) to indicate the provisional nature of the results of his investigations—modern specialist scholarship and the standard edition of Stanislavski's works follow that practice; see Benedetti (1999a, 169), Gauss (1999, 3–4), Milling and Ley (2001, 1), and Stanislavski (1938) and (1957).) of acting developed out of his persistent efforts to remove the blocks that he encountered in his performances, beginning with a major crisis in 1906. He produced his early work using an external, director-centred technique that strove for an organic unity of all its elements—in each production he planned the interpretation of every role, blocking, and the mise-en-scène in detail in advance. He also introduced into the production process a period of discussion and detailed analysis of the play by the cast. Despite the success that this approach brought, particularly with his Naturalistic stagings of the plays of Anton Chekhov and Maxim Gorky, Stanislavski remained dissatisfied.

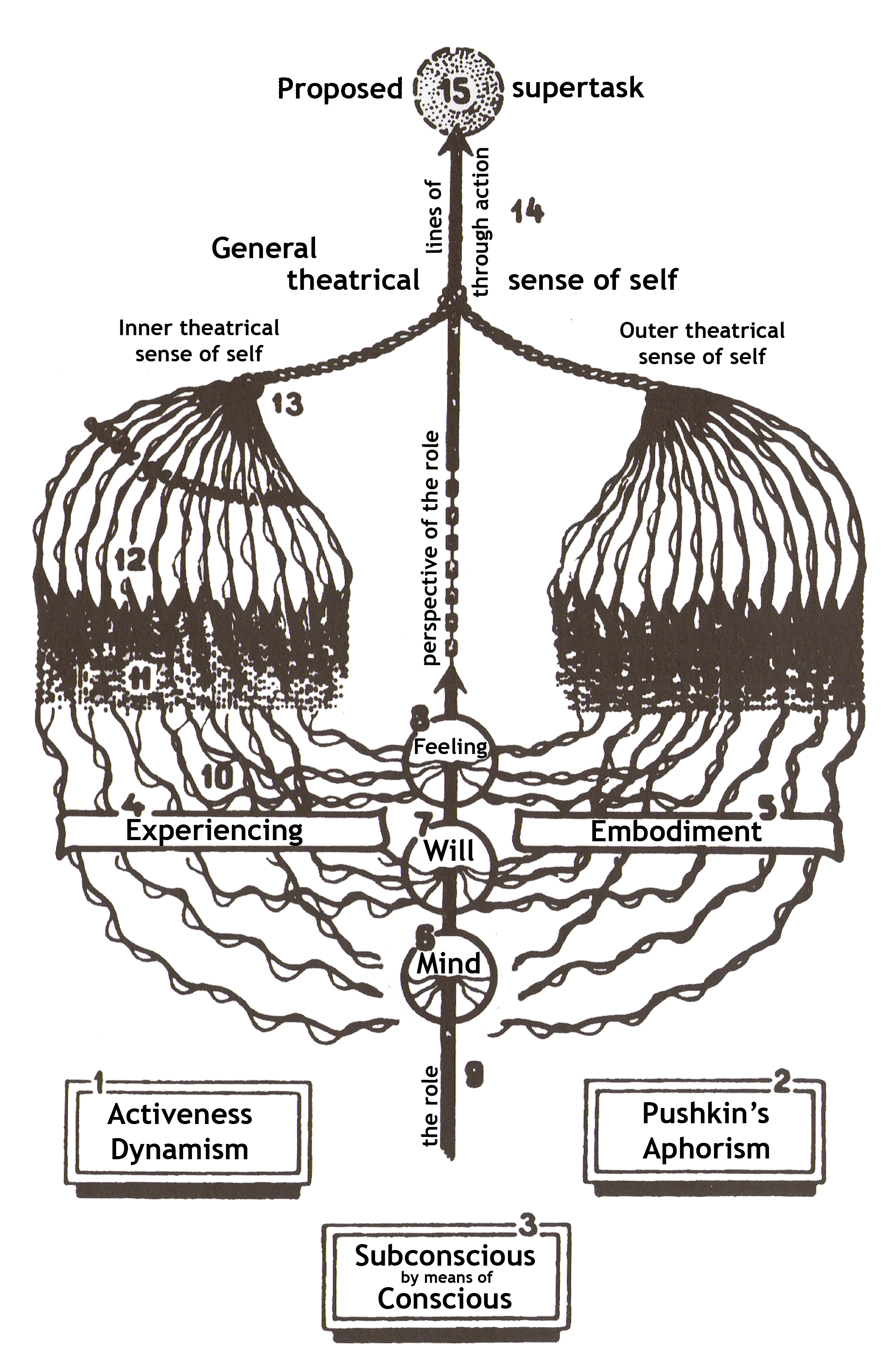
Diagram of Stanislavski's system, based on his "Plan of Experiencing" (1935), showing the inner (left) and outer (right) aspects of a role uniting in the pursuit of a character's overall "supertask" (top) in the drama.

Both his struggles with Chekhov's drama (out of which his notion of subtext emerged) and his experiments with Symbolism encouraged a greater attention to "inner action" and a more intensive investigation of the actor's process. He began to develop the more actor-centred techniques of "psychological realism" and his focus shifted from his productions to rehearsal process and pedagogy. He pioneered the use of theatre studios as a laboratory in which to innovate actor training and to experiment with new forms of theatre. Stanislavski organised his techniques into a coherent, systematic methodology, which built on three major strands of influence: (1) the director-centred, unified aesthetic and disciplined, ensemble approach of the Meiningen company; (2) the actor-centred realism of the Maly; and (3) the Naturalistic staging of Antoine and the independent theatre movement.

The system cultivates what Stanislavski calls the "art of experiencing" (to which he contrasts the "art of representation"). It mobilises the actor's conscious thought and will to activate other, less-controllable psychological processes—such as emotional experience and subconscious behaviour—sympathetically and indirectly. In rehearsal, the actor searches for inner motives to justify action and the definition of what the character seeks to achieve at any given moment (a "task"). Stanislavski's earliest reference to his system appears in 1909, the same year that he first incorporated it into his rehearsal process. The MAT adopted it as its official rehearsal method in 1911.

Later, Stanislavski further elaborated the system with a more physically grounded rehearsal process that came to be known as the "Method of Physical Action". Minimising at-the-table discussions, he now encouraged an "active analysis", in which the sequence of dramatic situations is improvised. "The best analysis of a play", Stanislavski argued, "is to take action in the given circumstances."

Just as the First Studio, led by his assistant and close friend Leopold Sulerzhitsky, had provided the forum in which he developed his initial ideas for the system during the 1910s, he hoped to secure his final legacy by opening another studio in 1935, in which the Method of Physical Action would be taught. The Opera-Dramatic Studio embodied the most complete implementation of the training exercises described in his manuals. Meanwhile, the transmission of his earlier work via the students of the First Studio was revolutionising acting in the West. With the arrival of Socialist realism in the USSR, the MAT and Stanislavski's system were enthroned as exemplary models.

== Family background and early influences ==
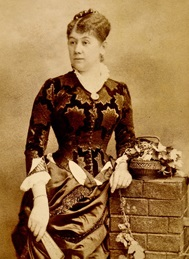
Glikeriya Fedotova, a student of Shchepkin, encouraged Stanislavski to reject inspiration, embrace training and observation, and to "look your partner straight in the eyes, read his thoughts in his eyes, and reply to him in accordance with the expression of his eyes and face."

Stanislavski had a privileged youth, growing up in one of the richest families in Russia, the Alekseyevs. He was born Konstantin Sergeyevich Alekseyev—he adopted the stage name "Stanislavski" in 1884 to keep his performance activities secret from his parents. Up until the communist revolution in 1917, Stanislavski often used his inherited wealth to fund his experiments in acting and directing. His family's discouragement meant that he appeared only as an amateur until he was thirty three.

As a child, Stanislavski was interested in the circus, the ballet, and puppetry. Later, his family's two private theatres provided a forum for his theatrical impulses. After his debut performance at one in 1877, he started what would become a lifelong series of notebooks filled with critical observations on his acting, aphorisms, and problems—it was from this habit of self-analysis and critique that Stanislavski's system later emerged. Stanislavski chose not to attend university, preferring to work in the family business.

Increasingly interested in "experiencing the role", Stanislavski experimented with maintaining a characterization in real life. In 1884, he began vocal training under Fyodor Komissarzhevsky, with whom he also explored the coordination of body and voice. A year later, Stanislavski briefly studied at the Moscow Theatre School but, disappointed with its approach, he left after little more than two weeks. Instead, he devoted particular attention to the performances of the Maly Theatre, the home of Russian psychological realism (as developed in the 19th century by Alexander Pushkin, Nikolai Gogol and Mikhail Shchepkin).

Shchepkin's legacy included a disciplined, ensemble approach, extensive rehearsals, and the use of careful observation, self-knowledge, imagination, and emotion as the cornerstones of the craft. Stanislavski called the Maly his "university". One of Shchepkin's students, Glikeriya Fedotova, taught Stanislavski; she instilled in him the rejection of inspiration as the basis of the actor's art, stressed the importance of training and discipline, and encouraged the practice of responsive interaction with other actors that Stanislavski came to call "communication". As well as the artists of the Maly, performances given by foreign stars influenced Stanislavski. The effortless, emotive, and clear playing of the Italian Ernesto Rossi, who performed major Shakespearean tragic protagonists in Moscow in 1877, particularly impressed him. So too did Tommaso Salvini's 1882 performance of Othello.

== Amateur work as an actor and director ==
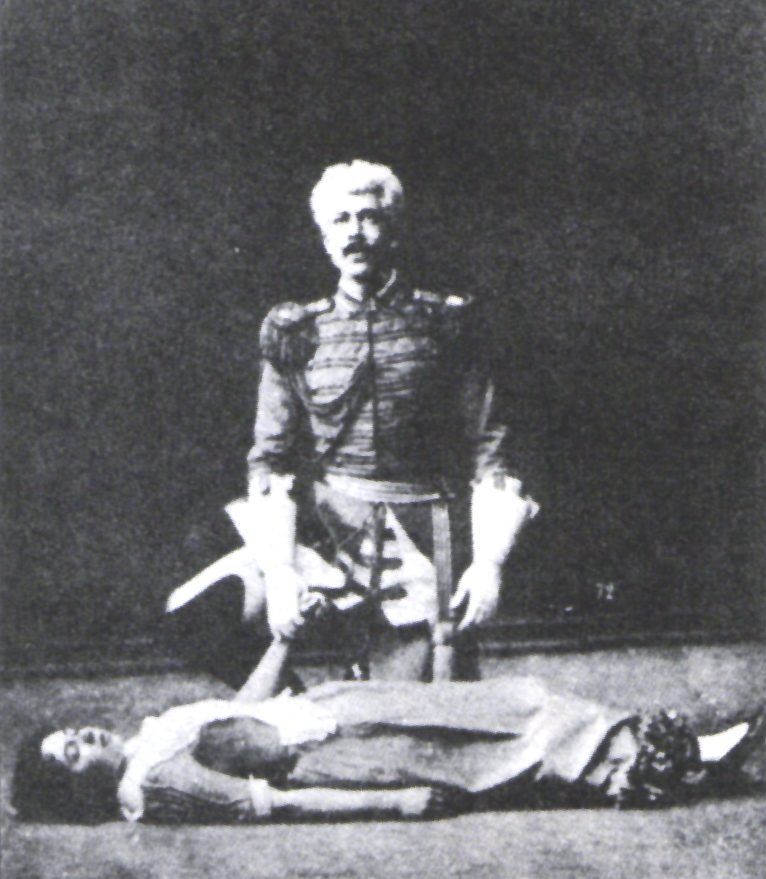
Stanislavski with his soon-to-be wife Maria Lilina in 1889 in Schiller's Intrigue and Love.

By now well known as an amateur actor, at the age of twenty-five, Stanslavski co-founded a Society of Art and Literature. Under its auspices, he performed in plays by Molière, Schiller, Pushkin, and Ostrovsky, as well as gaining his first experiences as a director. He became interested in the aesthetic theories of Vissarion Belinsky, from whom he took his conception of the role of the artist.

On 5 July [O.S. 23 June] 1889, Stanislavski married Maria Lilina (the stage name of Maria Petrovna Perevostchikova). Their first child, Xenia, died of pneumonia in May 1890, less than two months after she was born. Their second daughter, Kira, was born on 2 August [O.S. 21 July] 1891. In January 1893, Stanislavski's father died. Their son Igor was born on 26 September [O.S. 14 September] 1894.

In February 1891, Stanislavski directed Leo Tolstoy's The Fruits of Enlightenment for the Society of Art and Literature, in what he later described as his first fully independent directorial work. But it was not until 1893 he first met the great realist novelist and playwright that became another important influence on him. Five years later, the MAT would be his response to Tolstoy's demand for simplicity, directness, and accessibility in art.

Stanislavski's directorial methods at this time were closely modelled on the disciplined, autocratic approach of Ludwig Chronegk, the director of the Meiningen Ensemble. In My Life in Art (1924), Stanislavski described this approach as one in which the director is "forced to work without the help of the actor". From 1894 onward, Stanislavski began to assemble detailed prompt-books that included a directorial commentary on the entire play and from which not even the smallest detail was allowed to deviate.

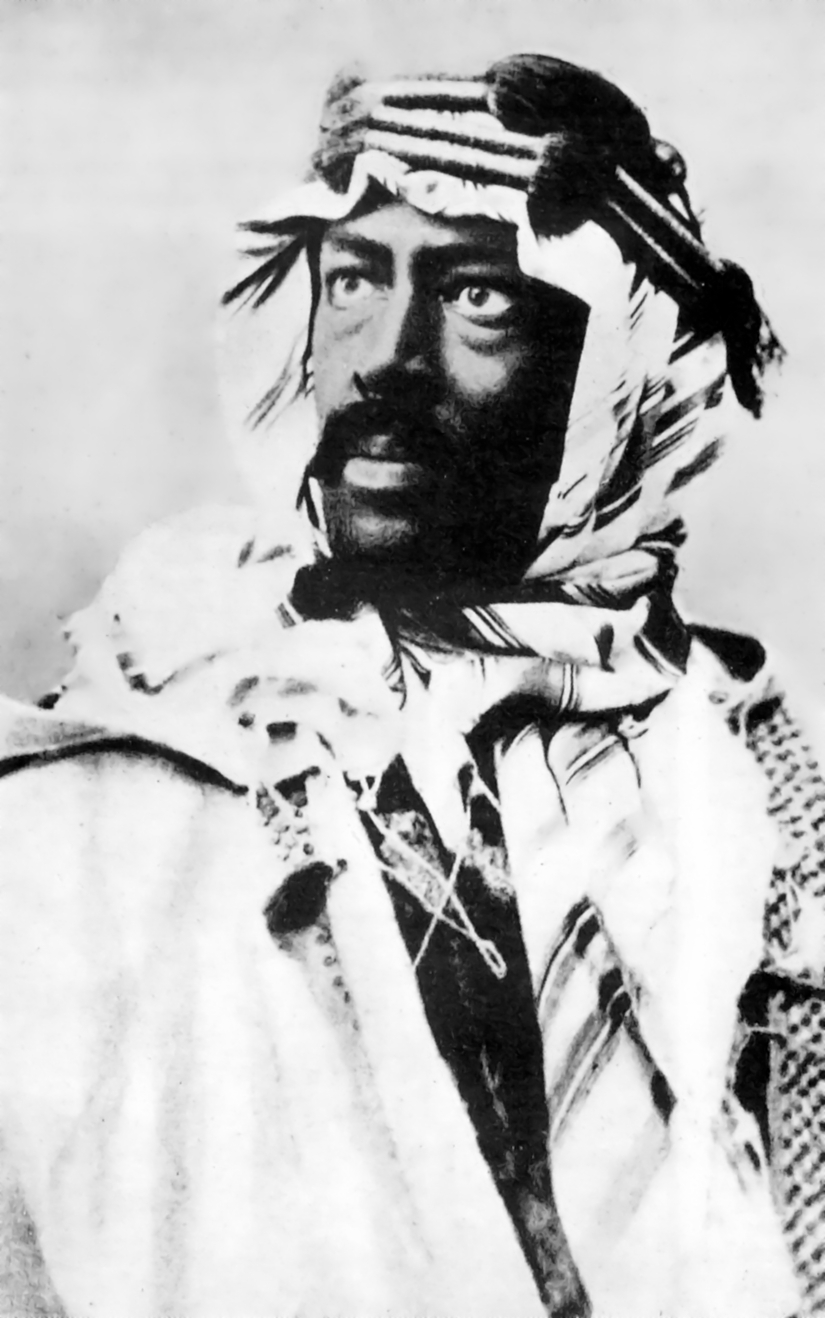
Stanislavski as Othello in 1896.

Whereas the Ensemble's effects tended toward the grandiose, Stanislavski introduced lyrical elaborations through the mise-en-scène that dramatised more mundane and ordinary elements of life, in keeping with Belinsky's ideas about the "poetry of the real". Using his rigid and detailed control of all theatrical elements, including the strict choreography of the actors' every gesture, in Stanislavski's words "the inner kernel of the play was revealed by itself". Analysing the Society's production of Othello (1896), Jean Benedetti observes that:

Stanislavski uses the theatre and its technical possibilities as an instrument of expression, a language, in its own right. The dramatic meaning is in the staging itself. [...] He went through the whole play in a completely different way, not relying on the text as such, with quotes from important speeches, not providing a 'literary' explanation, but speaking in terms of the play's dynamic, its action, the thoughts and feelings of the protagonists, the world in which they lived. His account flowed uninterruptedly from moment to moment.

Benedetti argues that Stanislavski's task at this stage was to unite the realistic tradition of the creative actor inherited from Shchepkin and Gogol with the director-centred, organically unified Naturalistic aesthetic of the Meiningen approach. That synthesis would emerge eventually, but only in the wake of Stanislavski's directorial struggles with Symbolist theatre and an artistic crisis in his work as an actor. "The task of our generation", Stanislavski wrote as he was about to found the Moscow Art Theatre and begin his professional life in the theatre, is "to liberate art from outmoded tradition, from tired cliché and to give greater freedom to imagination and creative ability."

== Creation of the Moscow Art Theatre ==
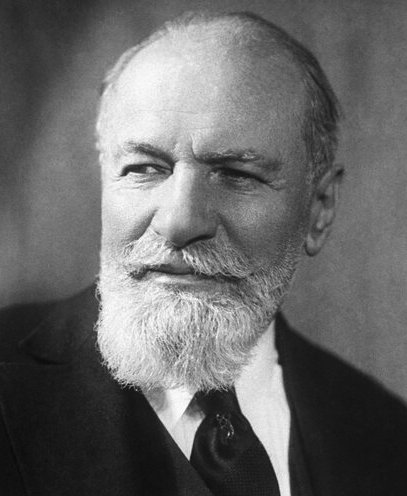
Vladimir Nemirovich-Danchenko, co-founder of the MAT, in 1916.

Stanislavski's historic meeting with Vladimir Nemirovich-Danchenko on 4 July [O.S. 22 June] 1897 led to the creation of what was called initially the "Moscow Public-Accessible Theatre", but which came to be known as the Moscow Art Theatre (MAT). Their eighteen-hour-long discussion has acquired a legendary status in the history of theatre.

Nemirovich was a successful playwright, critic, theatre director, and acting teacher at the Philharmonic School who, like Stanislavski, was committed to the idea of a popular theatre. Their abilities complemented one another: Stanislavski brought his directorial talent for creating vivid stage images and selecting significant details; Nemirovich, his talent for dramatic and literary analysis, his professional expertise, and his ability to manage a theatre. Stanislavski later compared their discussions to the Treaty of Versailles, their scope was so wide-ranging; they agreed on the conventional practices they wished to abandon and, on the basis of the working method they found they had in common, defined the policy of their new theatre.

Stanislavski and Nemirovich planned a professional company with an ensemble ethos that discouraged individual vanity; they would create a realistic theatre of international renown, with popular prices for seats, whose organically unified aesthetic would bring together the techniques of the Meiningen Ensemble and those of André Antoine's Théâtre Libre (which Stanislavski had seen during trips to Paris). Nemirovich assumed that Stanislavski would fund the theatre as a privately owned business, but Stanislavski insisted on a limited, joint stock company. Viktor Simov, whom Stanislavski had met in 1896, was engaged as the company's principal designer.

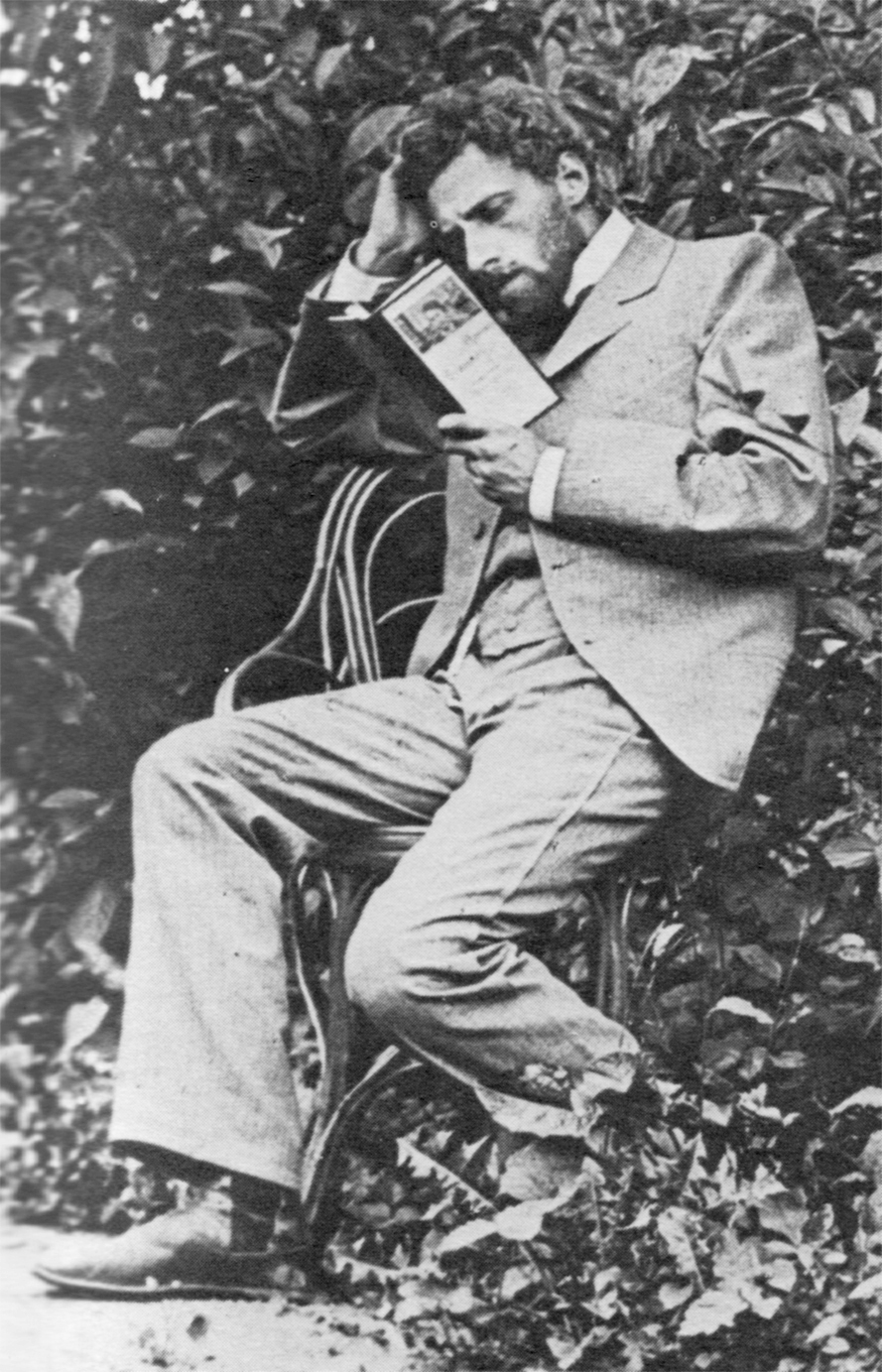
Vsevolod Meyerhold prepares for his role as Konstantin to Stanislavski's Trigorin in the MAT's 1898 production of Anton Chekhov's The Seagull.

In his opening speech on the first day of rehearsals, 26 June [O.S. 14 June] 1898, Stanislavski stressed the "social character" of their collective undertaking. In an atmosphere more like a university than a theatre, as Stanislavski described it, the company was introduced to his working method of extensive reading and research and detailed rehearsals in which the action was defined at the table before being explored physically. Stanislavski's lifelong relationship with Vsevolod Meyerhold began during these rehearsals; by the end of June, Meyerhold was so impressed with Stanislavski's directorial skills that he declared him a genius.

== Naturalism at the MAT ==
The lasting significance of Stanislavski's early work at the MAT lies in its development of a Naturalistic performance mode. In 1898, Stanislavski co-directed with Nemirovich the first of his productions of the work of Anton Chekhov. The MAT production of The Seagull was a crucial milestone for the fledgling company that has been described as "one of the greatest events in the history of Russian theatre and one of the greatest new developments in the history of world drama." Despite its 80 hours of rehearsal—a considerable length by the standards of the conventional practice of the day—Stanislavski felt it was under-rehearsed. The production's success was due to the fidelity of its delicate representation of everyday life, its intimate, ensemble playing, and the resonance of its mood of despondent uncertainty with the psychological disposition of the Russian intelligentsia of the time.

Stanislavski went on to direct the successful premières of Chekhov's other major plays: Uncle Vanya in 1899 (in which he played Astrov), Three Sisters in 1901 (playing Vershinin), and The Cherry Orchard in 1904 (playing Gaev). Stanislavski's encounter with Chekhov's drama proved crucial to the creative development of both men. His ensemble approach and attention to the psychological realities of its characters revived Chekhov's interest in writing for the stage, while Chekhov's unwillingness to explain or expand on the text forced Stanislavski to dig beneath its surface in ways that were new in theatre.

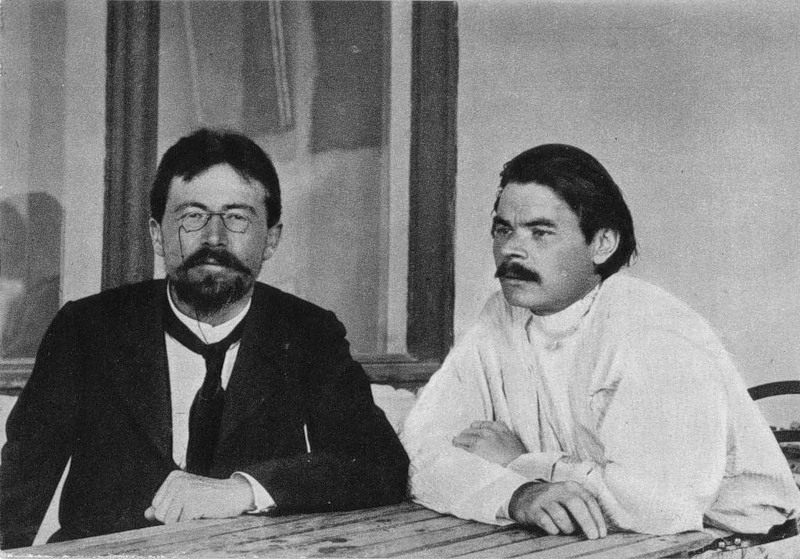
Anton Chekhov (left), who in 1900 introduced Stanislavski to Maxim Gorky (right).

In response to Stanislavski's encouragement, Maxim Gorky promised to launch his playwrighting career with the MAT. In 1902, Stanislavski directed the première productions of the first two of Gorky's plays, The Philistines and The Lower Depths. As part of the rehearsal preparations for the latter, Stanislavski took the company to visit Khitrov Market, where they talked to its down-and-outs and soaked up its atmosphere of destitution. Stanislavski based his characterisation of Satin on an ex-officer he met there, who had fallen into poverty through gambling. The Lower Depths was a triumph that matched the production of The Seagull four years earlier, though Stanislavski regarded his performance as external and mechanical.

The productions of The Cherry Orchard and The Lower Depths remained in the MAT's repertoire for decades. Along with Chekhov and Gorky, the drama of Henrik Ibsen formed an important part of Stanislavski's work at this time—in its first two decades, the MAT staged more plays by Ibsen than any other playwright. In its first decade, Stanislavski directed Hedda Gabler (in which he played Løvborg), An Enemy of the People (playing Dr Stockmann, his favorite role), The Wild Duck, and Ghosts. "More's the pity I was not a Scandinavian and never saw how Ibsen was played in Scandinavia," Stanislavski wrote, because "those who have been there tell me that he is interpreted as simply, as true to life, as we play Chekhov". He also staged other important Naturalistic works, including Gerhart Hauptmann's Drayman Henschel, Lonely People, and Michael Kramer and Leo Tolstoy's The Power of Darkness.

== Symbolism and the Theatre-Studio ==
In 1904, Stanislavski finally acted on a suggestion made by Chekhov two years earlier that he stage several one-act plays by Maurice Maeterlinck, the Belgian Symbolist. Despite his enthusiasm, however, Stanislavski struggled to realise a theatrical approach to the static, lyrical dramas. When the triple bill consisting of The Blind, Intruder, and Interior opened on 15 October [O.S. 2 October] 1904, the experiment was deemed a failure.

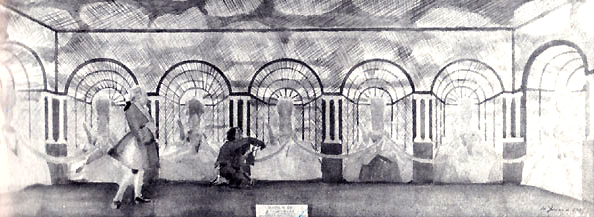
Design (by Nikolai Ulyanov) for Meyerhold's planned 1905 production of Hauptmann's Schluck and Jau at the Theatre-Studio he founded with Stanislavski, which relocated the play to a stylised abstraction of France under Louis XIV. Around the edge of the stage, ladies-in-waiting embroider an improbably long scarf with huge ivory needles. Stanislavski was particularly delighted by this idea.

Meyerhold, prompted by Stanislavski's positive response to his new ideas about Symbolist theatre, proposed that they form a "theatre studio" (a term which he invented) that would function as "a laboratory for the experiments of more or less experienced actors." The Theatre-Studio aimed to develop Meyerhold's aesthetic ideas into new theatrical forms that would return the MAT to the forefront of the avant-garde and Stanislavski's socially conscious ideas for a network of "people's theatres" that would reform Russian theatrical culture as a whole. Central to Meyerhold's approach was the use of improvisation to develop the performances.

When the studio presented a work-in-progress, Stanislavski was encouraged; when performed in a fully equipped theatre in Moscow, however, it was regarded as a failure, and the studio folded. Meyerhold drew an important lesson: "one must first educate a new actor and only then put new tasks before him", he wrote, adding that "Stanislavski, too, came to such a conclusion." Reflecting in 1908 on the Theatre-Studio's demise, Stanislavski wrote that "our theatre found its future among its ruins." Nemirovich disapproved of what he described as the malign influence of Meyerhold on Stanislavski's work at this time.

Stanislavski engaged two important new collaborators in 1905: Liubov Gurevich became his literary advisor, and Leopold Sulerzhitsky became his personal assistant. Stanislavski revised his interpretation of the role of Trigorin (and Meyerhold reprised his role as Konstantin) when the MAT revived its production of Chekhov's The Seagull on 13 October [O.S. 30 September] 1905.

This was the year of the abortive revolution in Russia. Stanislavski signed a protest against the violence of the secret police, Cossack troops, and the right-wing extremist paramilitary "Black Hundreds", which was submitted to the Duma on the 3 November [O.S. 21 October] 1905. Rehearsals for the MAT's production of Alexander Griboyedov's classic verse comedy Woe from Wit were interrupted by gun-battles on the streets outside. Stanislavski and Nemirovich closed the theatre and embarked on the company's first tour outside of Russia.

== European tour and artistic crisis ==
The MAT's first European tour began on 23 February [O.S. 10 February] 1906 in Berlin, where they played to an audience that included Max Reinhardt, Gerhart Hauptmann, Arthur Schnitzler, and Eleonora Duse. "It's as though we were the revelation", Stanislavski wrote of the rapturous acclaim they received. The success of the tour provided financial security for the company, garnered an international reputation for their work, and made a significant impact on European theatre. The tour also provoked a major artistic crisis for Stanislavski that had a significant impact on his future direction. From his attempts to resolve this crisis, his system would eventually emerge.

Sometime in March 1906, Jean Benedetti suggests that it was during An Enemy of the People—Stanislavski became aware that he was acting without a flow of inner impulses and feelings and that as a consequence his performance had become mechanical. He spent June and July in Finland on holiday, where he studied, wrote, and reflected. With his notebooks on his own experience from 1889 onwards, he attempted to analyze "the foundation stones of our art" and the actor's creative process in particular. He began to formulate a psychological approach to controlling the actor's process in a Manual on Dramatic Art.

== Productions as research into working methods ==
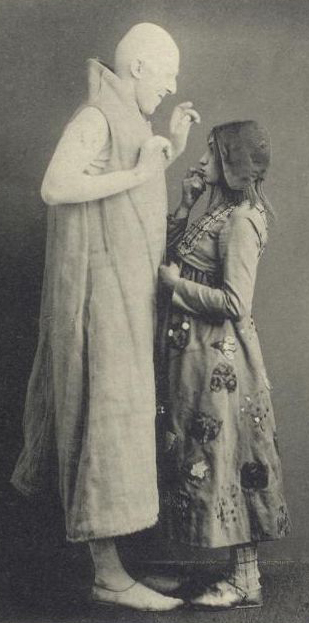
Sugar and Mytyl from Stanislavski's production of The Blue Bird (1908).

Stanislavski's activities began to move in a very different direction: his productions became opportunities for research, he was more interested in the process of rehearsal than its product, and his attention shifted away from the MAT towards its satellite projects—the theatre studios—in which he would develop his system. On his return to Moscow, he explored his new psychological approach in his production of Knut Hamsun's Symbolist play The Drama of Life. Nemirovich was particularly hostile to his new methods, and their relationship continued to deteriorate in this period. In a statement made on 9 February [O.S. 27 January] 1908, Stanislavski marked a significant shift in his directorial method and stressed the crucial contribution he now expected from a creative actor:

The committee is wrong if it thinks that the director's preparatory work in the study is necessary, as previously, when he alone decided the whole plan and all the details of the production, wrote the mise-en-scène and answered all the actors' questions for them. The director is no longer king, as before, when the actor possessed no clear individuality. [...] It is essential to understand this—rehearsals are divided into two stages: the first stage is one of experiment when the cast helps the director, the second is creating the performance when the director helps the cast.

Stanislavski's preparations for Maeterlinck's The Blue Bird (which was to become his most famous production to-date) included improvisations and other exercises to stimulate the actors' imaginations; Nemirovich described one in which the cast imitated various animals. In rehearsals he sought ways to encourage his actors' will to create afresh in every performance. He focused on the search for inner motives to justify action and the definition of what the characters are seeking to achieve at any given moment (what he would come to call their "task"). This use of the actor's conscious thought and will was designed to activate other, less-controllable psychological processes—such as emotional experience and subconscious behaviour—sympathetically and indirectly.

Noting the importance to great actors' performances of their ability to remain relaxed, he discovered that he could abolish physical tension by focusing his attention on the specific action that the play demanded; when his concentration wavered, his tension returned. "What fascinates me most", Stanislavski wrote in May 1908, "is the rhythm of feelings, the development of affective memory and the psycho-physiology of the creative process." His interest in the creative use of the actor's personal experiences was spurred by a chance conversation in Germany in July that led him to the work of French psychologist Théodule-Armand Ribot. His "affective memory" contributed to the technique that Stanislavski would come to call "emotion memory".

Together, these elements formed a new vocabulary with which he explored a "return to realism" in a production of Gogol's The Government Inspector as soon as The Blue Bird had opened. At a theatre conference on 21 March [O.S. 8 March] 1909, Stanislavski delivered a paper on his emerging system that stressed the role of his techniques of the "magic if" (which encourages the actor to respond to the fictional circumstances of the play "as if" they were real) and emotion memory. He developed his ideas about three trends in the history of acting, which were to appear eventually in the opening chapters of An Actor's Work: "stock-in-trade" acting, the art of representation, and the art of experiencing (his own approach).

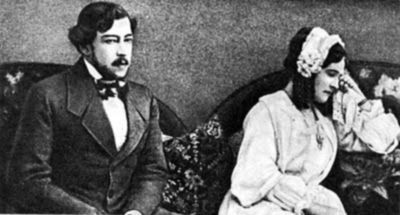
Stanislavski and Olga Knipper as Rakitin and Natalya in Ivan Turgenev's A Month in the Country (1909).

Stanislavski's production of A Month in the Country (1909) was a watershed in his artistic development. Breaking the MAT's tradition of open rehearsals, he prepared Turgenev's play in private. They began with a discussion of what he would come to call the "through-line" for the characters (their emotional development and the way they change over the course of the play). This production is the earliest recorded instance of his practice of analysing the action of the script into discrete "bits".

At this stage in the development of his approach, Stanislavski's technique was to identify the emotional state contained in the psychological experience of the character during each bit and, through the use of the actor's emotional memory, to forge a subjective connection to it. Only after two months of rehearsals were the actors permitted to physicalise the text. Stanislavski insisted that they should play the actions that their discussions around the table had identified. Having realised a particular emotional state in a physical action, he assumed at this point in his experiments, the actor's repetition of that action would evoke the desired emotion. As with his experiments in The Drama of Life, they also explored non-verbal communication, whereby scenes were rehearsed as "silent études" with actors interacting "only with their eyes". The production's success when it opened in December 1909 seemed to prove the validity of his new methodology.

Late in 1910, Gorky invited Stanislavski to join him in Capri, where they discussed actor training and Stanislavski's emerging "grammar". Inspired by a popular theatre performance in Naples that employed the techniques of the commedia dell'arte, Gorky suggested that they form a company, modeled on the medieval strolling players, in which a playwright and group of young actors would devise new plays together using improvisation. Stanislavski would develop this use of improvisation in his work with his First Studio.

== Staging the classics ==
In his treatment of the classics, Stanislavski believed that it was legitimate for actors and directors to ignore the playwright's intentions for a play's staging. One of his most important—a collaboration with Edward Gordon Craig on a production of Hamlet—became a landmark of 20th-century theatrical modernism. Stanislavski hoped to prove that his recently developed system for creating internally justified, realistic acting could meet the formal demands of a classic play. Craig envisioned a Symbolist monodrama in which every aspect of production would be subjugated to the protagonist: it would present a dream-like vision as seen through Hamlet's eyes.

Despite these contrasting approaches, the two practitioners did share some artistic assumptions; the system had developed out of Stanislavski's experiments with Symbolist drama, which had shifted his attention from a Naturalistic external surface to the characters' subtextual, inner world. Both had stressed the importance of achieving a unity of all theatrical elements in their work. Their production attracted enthusiastic and unprecedented worldwide attention for the theatre, placing it "on the cultural map for Western Europe", and it has come to be regarded as a seminal event that revolutionised the staging of Shakespeare's plays. It became "one of the most famous and passionately discussed productions in the history of the modern stage."

Increasingly absorbed by his teaching, in 1913 Stanislavski held open rehearsals for his production of Molière's The Imaginary Invalid as a demonstration of the system. As with his production of Hamlet and his next, Goldoni's The Mistress of the Inn, he was keen to assay his system in the crucible of a classical text. He began to inflect his technique of dividing the action of the play into bits with an emphasis on improvisation; he would progress from analysis, through free improvisation, to the language of the text:

I divide the work into large bits clarifying the nature of each bit. Then, immediately, in my own words, I play each bit, observing all the curves. Then I go through the experiences of each bit ten times or so with its curves (not in a fixed way, not being consistent). Then I follow the successive bits in the book. And finally, I make the transition, imperceptibly, to the experiences as expressed in the actual words of the part.

Stanislavski's struggles with both Molière and Goldoni comedies revealed the importance of an appropriate definition of what he calls a character's "super-task" (the core problem that unites and subordinates the character's moment-to-moment tasks). This impacted particularly on the actors' ability to serve the plays' genre, because an unsatisfactory definition produced tragic rather than comic performances.

Other European classics directed by Stanislavski include: Shakespeare's The Merchant of Venice, Twelfth Night, and Othello, an unfinished production of Molière's Tartuffe, and Beaumarchais' The Marriage of Figaro. Other classics of the Russian theatre directed by Stanislavki include: several plays by Ivan Turgenev, Griboyedov's Woe from Wit, Gogol's The Government Inspector, and plays by Tolstoy, Ostrovsky, and Pushkin.

== Studios and the search for a system ==
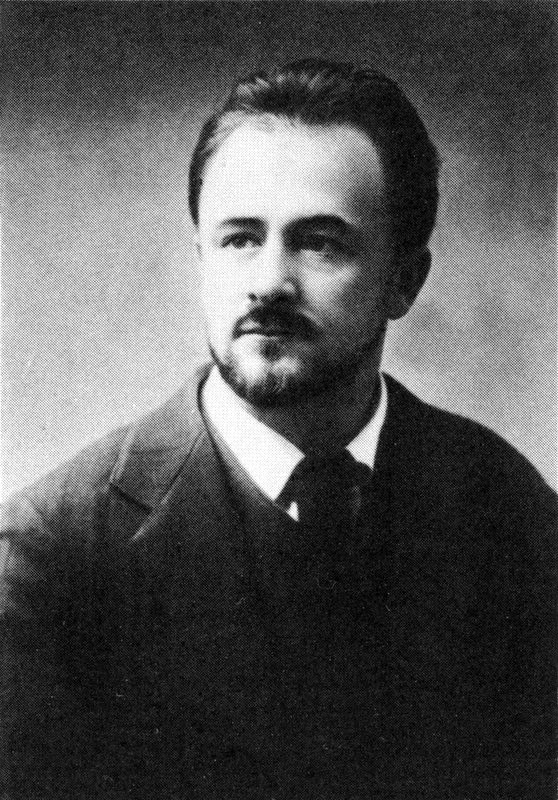
Leopold Sulerzhitsky in 1910, who led the First Studio and taught the elements of the system there.

Following the success of his production of A Month in the Country, Stanislavski made repeated requests to the board of the MAT for proper facilities to pursue his pedagogical work with young actors. Gorky encouraged him not to found a drama school to teach inexperienced beginners, but rather—following the example of the Theatre-Studio of 1905—to create a studio for research and experiment that would train young professionals.

Stanislavski created the First Studio on 14 September [O.S. 1 September] 1912. Its founding members included Yevgeny Vakhtangov, Michael Chekhov, Richard Boleslawski, and Maria Ouspenskaya, all of whom would exert a considerable influence on the subsequent history of theatre. Stanislavski selected Suler (as Gorky had nicknamed Sulerzhitsky) to lead the studio. In a focused, intense atmosphere, their work emphasised experimentation, improvisation, and self-discovery. Following Gorky's suggestions about devising new plays through improvisation, they searched for "the creative process common to authors, actors and directors".

Stanislavski created the Second Studio of the MAT in 1916, in response to a production of Zinaida Gippius' The Green Ring that a group of young actors had prepared independently. With a greater focus on pedagogical work than the First Studio, the Second Studio provided the environment in which Stanislavski developed the training techniques that would form the basis for his manual An Actor's Work (1938).

A significant influence on the development of the system came from Stanislavski's experience teaching and directing at his Opera Studio, which was founded in 1918. He hoped that the successful application of his system to opera, with its inescapable conventionality and artifice, would demonstrate the universality of his approach to performance and unite the work of Mikhail Shchepkin and Feodor Chaliapin. From this experience, Stanislavski's notion of "tempo-rhythm" emerged. He invited Serge Wolkonsky to teach diction and Lev Pospekhin to teach expressive movement and dance, and attended both of their classes as a student.

== From the First World War to the October Revolution ==
Stanislavski spent the summer of 1914 in Marienbad where, as he had in 1906, he researched the history of theatre and theories of acting to clarify the discoveries that his practical experiments had produced. When the First World War broke out, Stanislavski was in Munich. "It seemed to me", he wrote of the atmosphere at the train station in an article detailing his experiences, "that death was hovering everywhere."

The train was stopped at Immenstadt, where German soldiers denounced him as a Russian spy. Held in a room at the station with a large crowd with "the faces of wild beasts" baying at its windows, Stanislavski believed he was to be executed. He remembered that he was carrying an official document that mentioned having played to Kaiser Wilhelm during their tour of 1906 that, when he showed it to the officers, produced a change of attitude towards his group. They were placed on a slow train to Kempten. Gurevich later related how during the journey Stanislavski surprised her when he whispered that:

[E]vents of recent days had given him a clear impression of the superficiality of all that was called human culture, bourgeois culture, that a completely different kind of life was needed, where all needs were reduced to the minimum, where there was work—real artistic work—on behalf of the people, for those who had not yet been consumed by this bourgeois culture.

In Kempten they were again ordered into one of the station's rooms, where Stanislavski overheard the German soldiers complain of a lack of ammunition; it was only this, he understood, that prevented their execution. The following morning they were placed on a train and eventually returned to Russia via Switzerland and France.

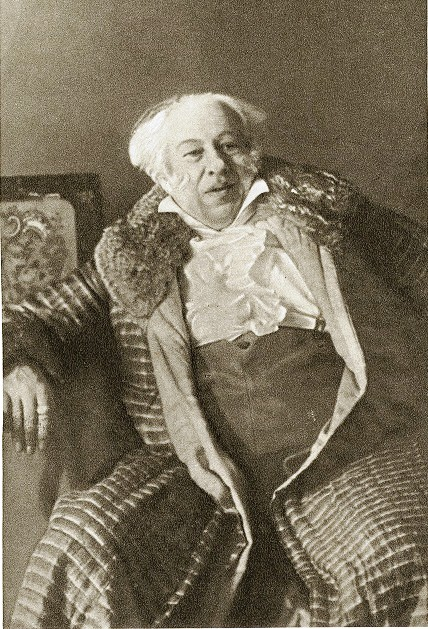
Stanislavski as Famusov in the 1914 revival of Griboyedov's Woe from Wit.

Turning to the classics of Russian theatre, the MAT revived Griboyedov's comedy Woe from Wit and planned to stage three of Pushkin's "little tragedies" in early 1915. Stanislavski continued to develop his system, explaining at an open rehearsal for Woe from Wit his concept of the state of "I am being". This term marks the stage in the rehearsal process when the distinction between actor and character blurs (producing the "actor/role"), subconscious behavior takes the lead, and the actor feels fully present in the dramatic moment. He stressed the importance to achieving this state of a focus on action ("What would I do if ...") rather than emotion ("How would I feel if ..."): "You must ask the kinds of questions that lead to dynamic action." Instead of forcing emotion, he explained, actors should notice what is happening, attend to their relationships with the other actors, and try to understand "through the senses" the fictional world that surrounds them.

When he prepared for his role in Pushkin's Mozart and Salieri, Stanislavski created a biography for Salieri in which he imagined the character's memories of each incident mentioned in the play, his relationships with the other people involved, and the circumstances that had impacted on Salieri's life. When he attempted to render all of this detail in performance, however, the subtext overwhelmed the text; overladen with heavy pauses, Pushkin's verse was fragmented to the point of incomprehensibility. His struggles with this role prompted him to attend more closely to the structure and dynamics of language in drama; to that end, he studied Serge Wolkonsky's The Expressive Word (1913).

The French theatre practitioner Jacques Copeau contacted Stanislavski in October 1916. As a result of his conversations with Edward Gordon Craig, Copeau had come to believe that his work at the Théâtre du Vieux-Colombier shared a common approach with Stanislavski's investigations at the MAT. On 30 December [O.S. 17 December] 1916, Stanislavski's assistant and closest friend, Leopold Sulerzhitsky, died from chronic nephritis. Reflecting on their relationship in 1931, Stanislavski said that Suler had understood him completely and that no one, since, had replaced him.

== Revolutions of 1917 and the Civil War years ==
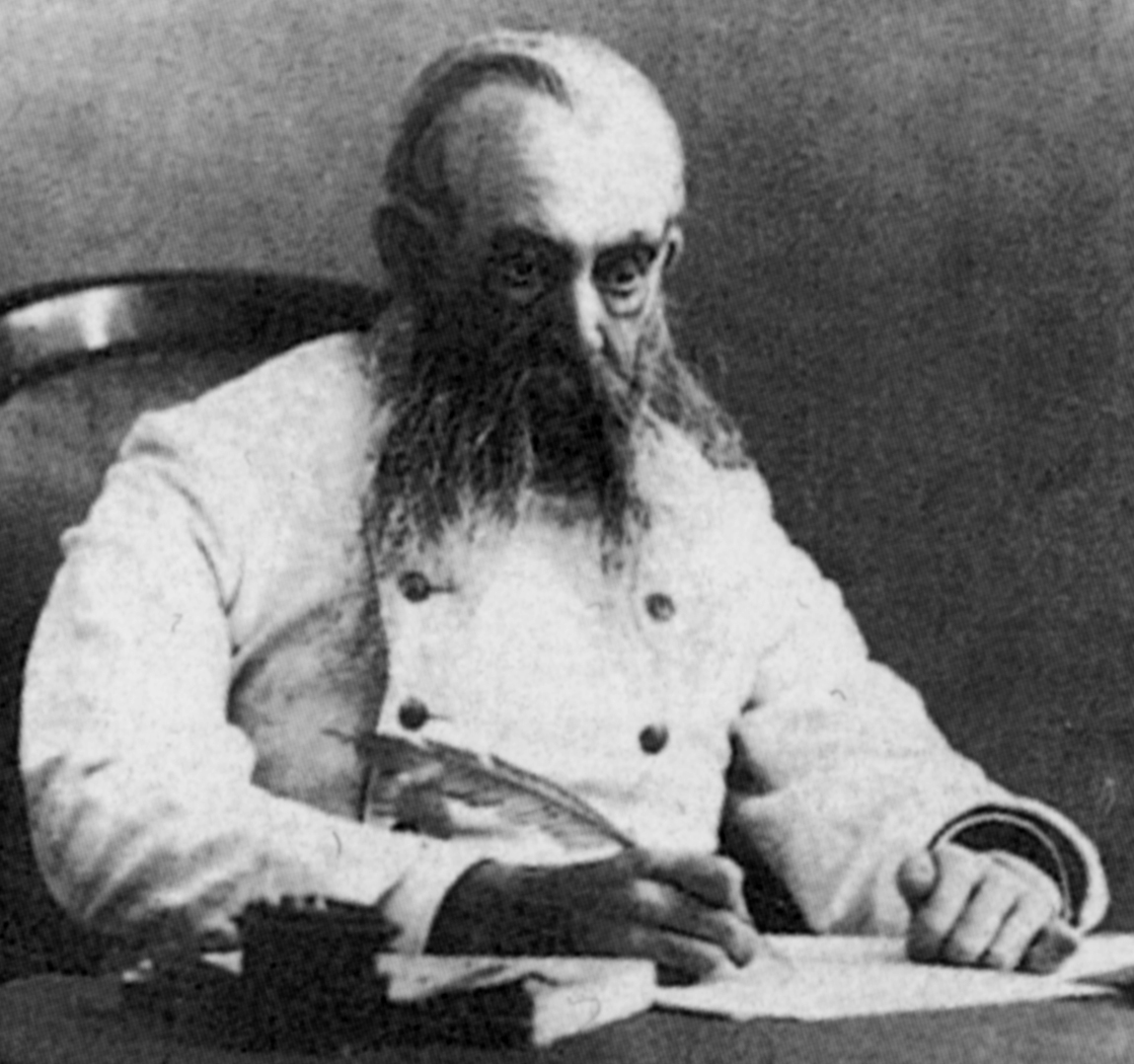
Stanislavski as General Krititski in Ostrovsky's Enough Stupidity in Every Wise Man. His performance was particularly admired by Lenin.

Stanislavski welcomed the February Revolution of 1917 and its overthrow of the absolute monarchy as a "miraculous liberation of Russia". With the October Revolution later in the year, the MAT closed for a few weeks and the First Studio was occupied by revolutionaries. Stanislavski thought that the social upheavals presented an opportunity to realize his long-standing ambitions to establish a Russian popular theatre that would provide, as the title of an essay he prepared that year put it, "The Aesthetic Education of the Popular Masses".

Vladimir Lenin, who became a frequent visitor to the MAT after the revolution, praised Stanislavski as "a real artist" and indicated that, in his opinion, Stanislavski's approach was "the direction the theatre should take." The revolutions of that year brought about an abrupt change in Stanislavski's finances when his factories were nationalized, which left his wage from the MAT as his only source of income. On 29 August 1918 Stanislavski, along with several others from the MAT, was arrested by the Cheka, though he was released the following day.

During the years of the Civil War, Stanislavski concentrated on teaching his system, directing (both at the MAT and its studios), and bringing performances of the classics to new audiences (such as factory workers and the Red Army). Several articles on Stanislavski and his system were published, but none were written by him. On 5 March 1921, Stanislavski was evicted from his large house on Carriage Row, where he had lived since 1903. Following the personal intervention of Lenin (prompted by Anatoly Lunacharsky), Stanislavski was rehoused at 6 Leontievski Lane, not far from the MAT. He was to live there until his death in 1938. On 29 May 1922, Stanislavski's favourite pupil, the director Yevgeny Vakhtangov, died of cancer.

== MAT tours in Europe and the United States ==
In the wake of the temporary withdrawal of the state subsidy to the MAT that came with the New Economic Policy in 1921, Stanislavski and Nemirovich planned a tour to Europe and the US to augment the company's finances. The tour began in Berlin, where Stanislavski arrived on 18 September 1922, and proceeded to Prague, Zagreb, and Paris, where he was welcomed at the station by Jacques Hébertot, Lugné-Poe, and Jacques Copeau. In Paris, he also met André Antoine, Louis Jouvet, Isadora Duncan, Firmin Gémier, and Harley Granville-Barker. He discussed with Copeau the possibility of establishing an international theatre studio and attended performances by Ermete Zacconi, whose control of his performance, economic expressivity, and ability both to "experience" and "represent" the role impressed him.

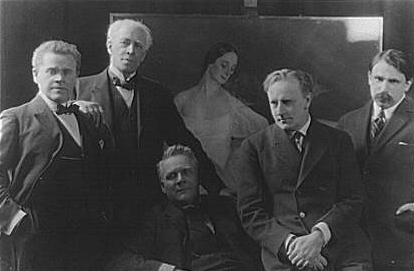
From left to right: Ivan Moskvin, Stanislavski, Feodor Chaliapin, Vasily Kachalov, Saveli Sorine, in the US in 1923.

The company sailed to New York City and arrived on 4 January 1923. When reporters asked about their repertoire, Stanislavski explained that "America wants to see what Europe already knows." David Belasco, Sergei Rachmaninoff, and Feodor Chaliapin attended the opening night performance. Thanks in part to a vigorous publicity campaign that the American producer, Morris Gest, orchestrated, the tour garnered substantial critical praise, although it was not a financial success.

As actors (among whom was the young Lee Strasberg) flocked to the performances to learn from the company, the tour made a substantial contribution to the development of American acting. Richard Boleslawski presented a series of lectures on Stanislavski's system (which were eventually published as Acting: The First Six Lessons in 1933). A performance of Three Sisters on 31 March 1923 concluded the season in New York, after which they travelled to Chicago, Philadelphia, and Boston.

At the request of a US publisher, Stanislavski reluctantly agreed to write his autobiography, My Life in Art, since his proposals for an account of the system or a history of the MAT and its approach had been rejected. He returned to Europe during the summer where he worked on the book and, in September, began rehearsals for a second tour. The company returned to New York on 7 November and went on to perform in Philadelphia, Boston, New Haven, Hartford, Washington, D.C., Brooklyn, Newark, Pittsburgh, Chicago, and Detroit. On 20 March 1924, Stanislavski met President Calvin Coolidge at the White House. They were introduced by a translator, Elizabeth Hapgood, with whom he would later collaborate on An Actor Prepares. The company left the US on 17 May 1924.

== Soviet productions ==
On his return to Moscow in August 1924, Stanislavski began with the help of Gurevich to make substantial revisions to his autobiography, in preparation for a definitive Russian-language edition, which was published in September 1926. He continued to act, reprising the role of Astrov in a new production of Uncle Vanya (his performance of which was described as "staggering"). With Nemirovich away touring with his Music Studio, Stanislavski led the MAT for two years, during which time the company thrived.

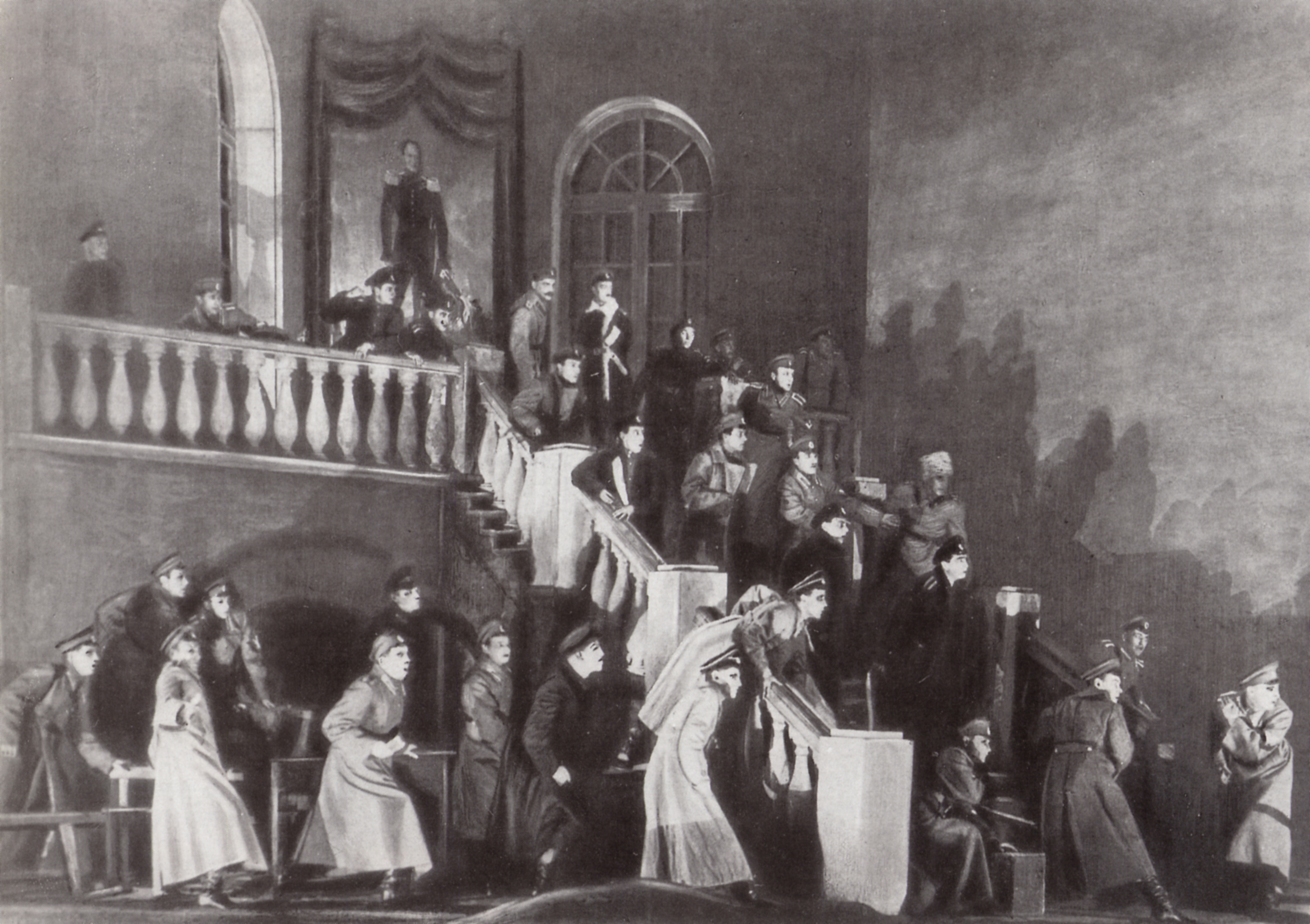
Stanislavski's production of Mikhail Bulgakov's The Days of the Turbins (1926), with scenic design by Aleksandr Golovin.

With a company fully versed in his system, Stanislavski's work on Mikhail Bulgakov's The Days of the Turbins focused on the tempo-rhythm of the production's dramatic structure and the through-lines of action for the individual characters and the play as a whole. "See everything in terms of action," he advised them. Aware of the disapproval of Bulgakov felt by the Repertory Committee (Glavrepertkom) of the People's Commissariat for Education, Stanislavski threatened to close the theatre if the play was banned. Despite substantial hostility from the press, the production was a box-office success.

In an attempt to render a classic play relevant to a contemporary Soviet audience, Stanislavski re-located the action in his fast and free-flowing production of Pierre Beaumarchais' 18th-century comedy The Marriage of Figaro to pre-Revolutionary France and emphasised the democratic point of view of Figaro and Susanna, in preference to that of the aristocratic Count Almaviva. His working methods contributed innovations to the system: the analysis of scenes in terms of concrete physical tasks and the use of the "line of the day" for each character.

In preference to the tightly controlled, Meiningen-inspired scoring of the mise-en-scène with which he had choreographed crowd scenes in his early years, he now worked in terms of broad physical tasks: actors responded truthfully to the circumstances of scenes with sequences of improvised adaptations that attempted to solve concrete, physical problems. For the "line of the day," an actor elaborates in detail the events that supposedly occur to the character "off-stage", in order to form a continuum of experience (the "line" of the character's life that day) that helps to justify his or her behaviour "on-stage". This means that the actor develops a relationship to where (as a character) he has just come from and to where he intends to go when leaving the scene. The production was a great success, garnering ten curtain calls on opening night. Thanks to its cohesive unity and rhythmic qualities, it is recognised as one of Stanislavski's major achievements.

With a performance of extracts from its major productions—including the first act of Three Sisters in which Stanislavski played Vershinin—the MAT celebrated its 30-year jubilee on 29 October 1928. While performing Stanislavski suffered a massive heart attack, although he continued until the curtain call, after which he collapsed. With that, his acting career came to an end.

== A manual for actors ==
While on holiday in August 1926, Stanislavski began to develop what would become An Actor's Work, his manual for actors written in the form of a fictional student's diary. Ideally, Stanislavski felt, it would consist of two volumes: the first would detail the actor's inner experiencing and outer, physical embodiment; the second would address rehearsal processes. Since the Soviet publishers used a format that would have made the first volume unwieldy, however, in practice this became three volumes—inner experiencing, outer characterisation, and rehearsal—each of which would be published separately, as it became ready.

The danger that such an arrangement would obscure the mutual interdependence of these parts in the system as a whole would be avoided, Stanislavski hoped, by means of an initial overview that would stress their integration in his psycho-physical approach; as it turned out, however, he never wrote the overview and many English-language readers came to confuse the first volume on psychological processes—published in a heavily abridged version in the US as An Actor Prepares (1936)—with the system as a whole.

The two editors—Hapgood with the American edition and Gurevich with the Russian—made conflicting demands on Stanislavski. Gurevich became increasingly concerned that splitting An Actor's Work into two books would not only encourage misunderstandings of the unity and mutual implication of the psychological and physical aspects of the system, but would also give its Soviet critics grounds on which to attack it: "to accuse you of dualism, spiritualism, idealism, etc." Frustrated with Stanislavski's tendency to tinker with details in preference to addressing more important missing sections, in May 1932 she terminated her involvement. Hapgood echoed Gurevich's frustration.

In 1933, Stanislavski worked on the second half of An Actor's Work. By 1935, a version of the first volume was ready for publication in America, to which the publishers made significant abridgements. A significantly different and far more complete Russian edition, An Actor's Work on Himself, Part I, was not published until 1938, just after Stanislavski's death. The second part of An Actor's Work on Himself was published in the Soviet Union in 1948; an English-language variant, Building a Character, was published a year later. The third volume, An Actor's Work on a Role, was published in the Soviet Union in 1957; its nearest English-language equivalent, Creating a Role, was published in 1961. The differences between the Russian and English-language editions of volumes two and three were even greater than those of the first volume. In 2008, an English-language translation of the complete Russian edition of An Actor's Work was published, with one of An Actor's Work on a Role following in 2010.

== Development of the Method of Physical Action ==
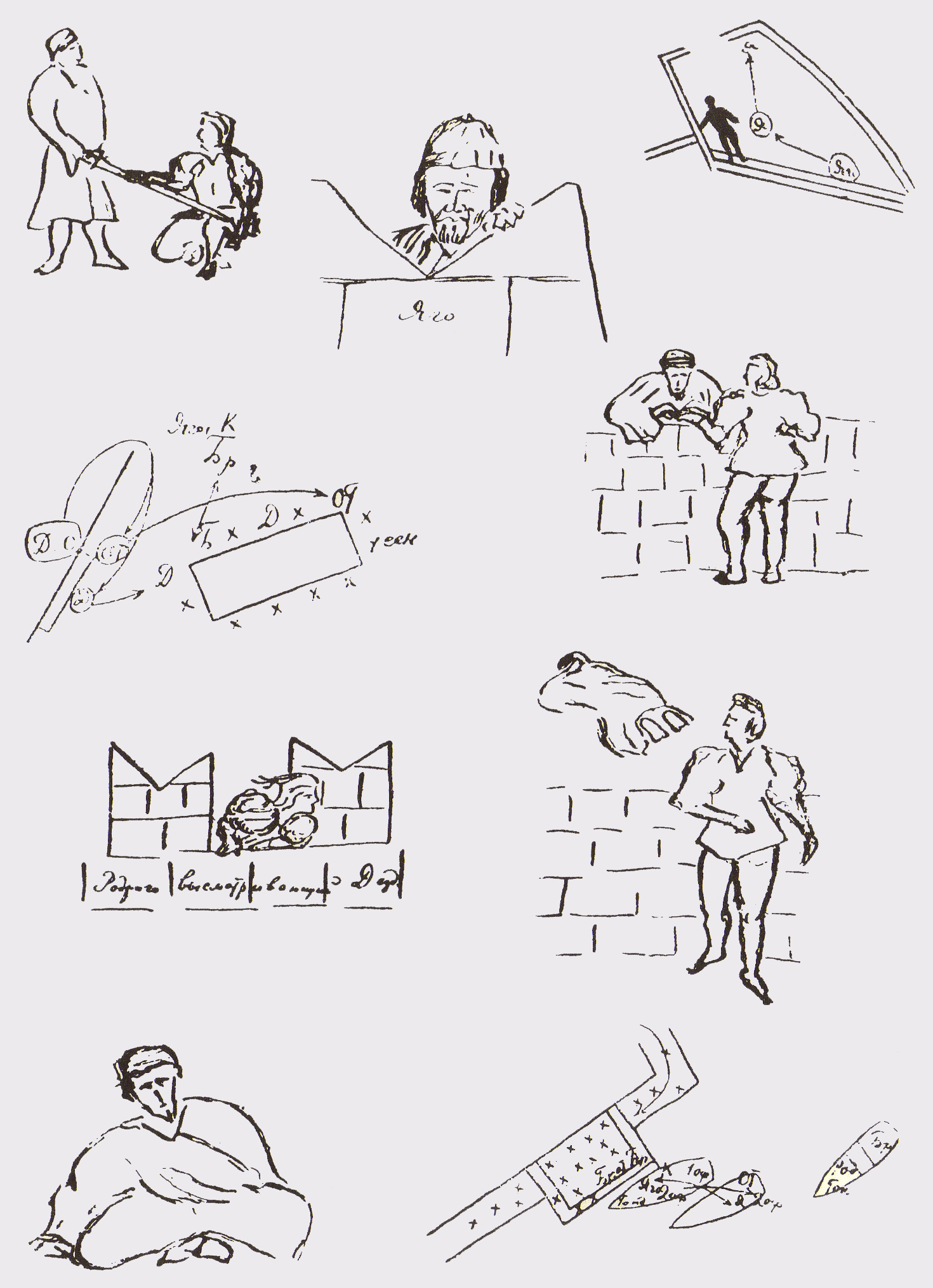
Sketches by Stanislavski in his 1929–1930 production plan for Othello, which offers the first exposition of what came to be known as his Method of Physical Action rehearsal process.

While recuperating in Nice at the end of 1929, Stanislavski began a production plan for Shakespeare's Othello. Hoping to use this as the basis for An Actor's Work on a Role, his plan offers the earliest exposition of the rehearsal process that became known as his Method of Physical Action. He first explored this approach practically in his work on Three Sisters and Carmen in 1934 and Molière in 1935.

In contrast to his earlier method of working on a play—which involved extensive readings and analysis around a table before any attempt to physicalise its action—Stanislavski now encouraged his actors to explore the action through its "active analysis". He felt that too much discussion in the early stages of rehearsal confused and inhibited the actors. Instead, focusing on the simplest physical actions, they improvised the sequence of dramatic situations given in the play. "The best analysis of a play", he argued, "is to take action in the given circumstances." If the actor justified and committed to the truth of the actions (which are easier to shape and control than emotional responses), Stanislavski reasoned, they would evoke truthful thoughts and feelings.

Stanislavski's attitude to the use of emotion memory in rehearsals (as distinct from its use in actor training) had shifted over the years. Ideally, he felt, an instinctive identification with a character's situation should arouse an emotional response. The use of emotion memory in lieu of that had demonstrated a propensity for encouraging self-indulgence or hysteria in the actor. Its direct approach to feeling, Stanislavski felt, more often produced a block than the desired expression. Instead, an indirect approach to the subconscious via a focus on actions (supported by a commitment to the given circumstances and imaginative "Magic Ifs") was a more reliable means of luring the appropriate emotional response.

This shift in approach corresponded both with an increased attention to the structure and dynamic of the play as a whole and with a greater prominence given to the distinction between the planning of a role and its performance. In performance the actor is aware of only one step at a time, Stanislavski reasoned, but this focus risks the loss of the overall dynamic of a role in the welter of moment-to-moment detail. Consequently, the actor must also adopt a different point of view in order to plan the role in relation to its dramatic structure; this might involve adjusting the performance by holding back at certain moments and playing full out at others. A sense of the whole thereby informs the playing of each episode. Borrowing a term from Henry Irving, Stanislavski called this the "perspective of the role".

Every afternoon for five weeks during the summer of 1934 in Paris, Stanislavski worked with the American actress Stella Adler, who had sought his assistance with the blocks she had confronted in her performances. Given the emphasis that emotion memory had received in New York City, Adler was surprised to find that Stanislavski rejected the technique except as a last resort. The news that this was Stanislavski's approach would have significant repercussions in the US; Lee Strasberg angrily rejected it and refused to modify his version of the system.

== Political fortunes under Stalin ==
Following his heart attack in 1928, for the last decade of his life Stanislavski conducted most of his work writing, directing rehearsals, and teaching in his home on Leontievski Lane. In line with Joseph Stalin's policy of "isolation and preservation" towards certain internationally famous cultural figures, Stanislavski lived in a state of internal exile in Moscow. This protected him from the worst excesses of Stalin's "Great Terror".

A number of articles critical of the terminology of Stanislavski's system appeared in the run-up to a RAPP conference in early 1931, at which the attacks continued. The system stood accused of philosophical idealism, of a-historicism, of disguising social and political problems under ethical and moral terms, and of "biological psychologism" (or "the suggestion of fixed qualities in nature"). In the wake of the first congress of the Union of Soviet Writers (chaired by Maxim Gorky in August 1934), however, Socialist realism was established as the official party line in aesthetic matters. While the new policy would have disastrous consequences for the Soviet avant-garde, the MAT and Stanislavski's system were enthroned as exemplary models.

== Final work at the Opera-Dramatic Studio ==
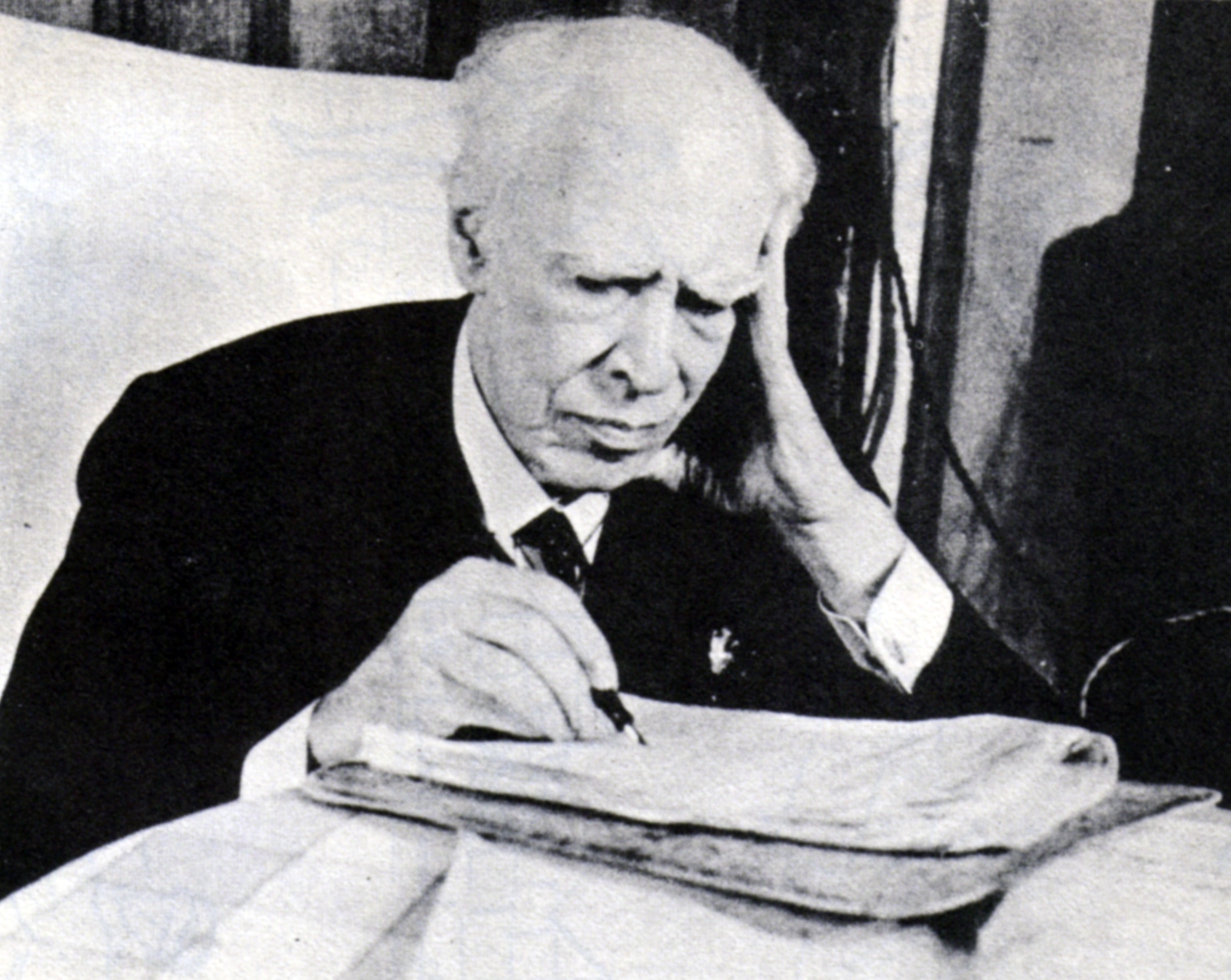
Stanislavski at work in the final year of his life.

Given the difficulties he had with completing his manual for actors, Stanislavski decided that he needed to found a new studio if he was to ensure his legacy. "Our school will produce not just individuals," he wrote, "but a whole company". In June 1935, he began to instruct a group of teachers in the training techniques of the system and the rehearsal processes of the Method of Physical Action. Twenty students (out of 3,500 auditionees) were accepted for the dramatic section of the Opera-Dramatic Studio, where classes began on 15 November. Stanislavski arranged a curriculum of four years of study that focused exclusively on technique and method—two years of the work detailed later in An Actor's Work and two of that in An Actor's Work on a Role.

Once the students were acquainted with the training techniques of the first two years, Stanislavski selected Hamlet and Romeo and Juliet for their work on roles. He worked with the students in March and April 1937, focusing on their sequences of physical actions, on establishing their through-lines of action, and on rehearsing scenes anew in terms of the actors' tasks. By June 1938, the students were ready for their first public showing, at which they performed a selection of scenes to a small number of spectators. The Opera-Dramatic Studio embodied the most complete implementation of the training exercises that Stanislavski described in his manuals.

From late 1936 onwards, Stanislavski began to meet regularly with Vsevolod Meyerhold, with whom he discussed the possibility of developing a common theatrical language. In 1938, they made plans to work together on a production and discussed a synthesis of Stanislavski's Method of Physical Action and Meyerhold's biomechanical training. On 8 March, Meyerhold took over the rehearsals for Rigoletto, the staging of which he completed after Stanislavski's death. On his deathbed, Stanislavski declared to Yuri Bakhrushin that Meyerhold was "my sole heir in the theatre—here or anywhere else". Stalin's police tortured and killed Meyerhold in February 1940.

Stanislavski died in his home at 3:45 pm on 7 August 1938, having probably suffered another heart attack five days earlier. Thousands of people attended his funeral. Three weeks after his death, his widow, Lilina, received an advanced copy of the Russian-language edition of the first volume of An Actor's Work—the "labour of his life", as she called it. Stanislavski was buried in the Novodevichy Cemetery in Moscow, not far from the grave of Anton Chekhov.

== See also ==
- Stella Adler
- Ion Cojar
- Ivana Chubbuck
- Sanford Meisner
- Psycho-physical Awareness
- Lee Strasberg

== Sources ==
=== Primary sources ===
- Stanislavski, Konstantin. 1936. An Actor Prepares. London: Methuen, 1988. ISBN 0-413-46190-4.
- Stanislavski, Konstantin. 1938. An Actor's Work: A Student's Diary. Trans. and ed. Jean Benedetti. London and New York: Routledge, 2008. ISBN 0-415-42223-X.
- Stanislavski, Konstantin. 1950. Stanislavsky on the Art of the Stage. Trans. David Magarshack. London: Faber, 2002. ISBN 0-571-08172-X.
- Stanislavski, Konstantin. 1957. An Actor's Work on a Role. Trans. and ed. Jean Benedetti. London and New York: Routledge, 2010. ISBN 0-415-46129-4.
- Stanislavski, Konstantin. 1961. Creating a Role. Trans. Elizabeth Reynolds Hapgood. London: Mentor, 1968. ISBN 0-450-00166-0.
- Stanislavski, Konstantin. 1963. An Actor's Handbook: An Alphabetical Arrangement of Concise Statements on Aspects of Acting. Ed. and trans. Elizabeth Reynolds Hapgood. London: Methuen, 1990. ISBN 0-413-63080-3.
- Stanislavski, Konstantin. 1968. Stanislavski's Legacy: A Collection of Comments on a Variety of Aspects of an Actor's Art and Life. Ed. and trans. Elizabeth Reynolds Hapgood. Revised and expanded edition. London: Methuen, 1981. ISBN 0-413-47770-3.
- Stanislavski, Constantin, and Pavel Rumyantsev. 1975. Stanislavski on Opera. Trans. Elizabeth Reynolds Hapgood. London: Routledge, 1998. ISBN 0-87830-552-1.

=== Secondary sources ===
- Allen, David. 2000. Performing Chekhov. London: Routledge. ISBN 978-0-415-18935-4.
- Bablet, Denis. 1962. The Theatre of Edward Gordon Craig. Trans. Daphne Woodward. London: Methuen, 1981. ISBN 978-0-413-47880-1.
- Banham, Martin, ed. 1998. The Cambridge Guide to Theatre. Cambridge: Cambridge UP. ISBN 0-521-43437-8.
- Benedetti, Jean. 1989. Stanislavski: An Introduction. Revised edition. Original edition published in 1982. London: Methuen. ISBN 0-413-50030-6.
- Benedetti, Jean. 1998. Stanislavski and the Actor. London: Methuen. ISBN 0-413-71160-9.
- Benedetti, Jean. 1999a. Stanislavski: His Life and Art. Revised edition. Original edition published in 1988. London: Methuen. ISBN 0-413-52520-1.
- Benedetti, Jean. 1999b. "Stanislavsky and the Moscow Art Theatre, 1898–1938". In Leach and Borovsky (1999, 254–277).
- Benedetti, Jean. 2005. The Art of the Actor: The Essential History of Acting, From Classical Times to the Present Day. London: Methuen. ISBN 0-413-77336-1.
- Benedetti, Jean. 2008a. Foreword. In Stanislavski (1938, xv–xxii).
- Benedetti, Jean. 2008b. "Stanislavski on Stage". In Dacre and Fryer (2008, 6–9).
- Botting, Gary. 1972. The Theatre of Protest in America (Edmonton, Harden House, 1972), Introduction.
- Braun, Edward. 1982. "Stanislavsky and Chekhov". The Director and the Stage: From Naturalism to Grotowski. London: Methuen. ISBN 0-413-46300-1. p. 59–76.
- Braun, Edward. 1988. Introduction. In Plays: 1. By Maxim Gorky. Methuen World Classics ser. London: Methuen. xv–xxxii. ISBN 0-413-18110-3.
- Braun, Edward. 1995. Meyerhold: A Revolution in Theatre. Rev. 2nd ed. London: Methuen. ISBN 0-413-72730-0.
- Carnicke, Sharon M. 1998. Stanislavsky in Focus. Russian Theatre Archive Ser. London: Harwood Academic Publishers. ISBN 90-5755-070-9.
- Carnicke, Sharon M. 2000. "Stanislavsky's System: Pathways for the Actor". In Hodge (2000, 11–36).
- Clark, Katerina et al., ed. 2007. Soviet Culture and Power: A History in Documents, 1917–1953. Annals of Communism ser. New Haven: Yale UP. ISBN 0-300-10646-7.
- Counsell, Colin. 1996. Signs of Performance: An Introduction to Twentieth-Century Theatre. London and New York: Routledge. ISBN 0-415-10643-5.
- Dacre, Kathy, and Paul Fryer, eds. 2008. Stanislavski on Stage. Sidcup, Kent: Stanislavski Centre, Rose Bruford College. ISBN 1-903454-01-8.
- Gauss, Rebecca B. 1999. Lear's Daughters: The Studios of the Moscow Art Theatre 1905–1927. American University Studies ser. 26 Theatre Arts, vol. 29. New York: Peter Lang. ISBN 0-8204-4155-4.
- Golub, Spencer. 1998a. "Stanislavsky, Konstantin (Sergeevich)". In Banham (1998, 1032–1033).
- Golub, Spencer. 1998b. "Shchepkin, Mikhail (Semyonovich)". In Banham (1998, 985–986).
- Gordon, Marc. 2000. "Salvaging Strasberg at the Fin de Siècle". In Krasner (2000, 43–60).
- Gordon, Robert. 2006. The Purpose of Playing: Modern Acting Theories in Perspective. Ann Arbor: U of Michigan P. ISBN 0-472-06887-3.
- Hodge, Alison, ed. 2000. Twentieth-Century Actor Training. London and New York: Routledge. ISBN 0-415-19452-0.
- Houghton, Norris. 1973. "Russian Theatre in the 20th Century". The Drama Review 17.1 (T-57, March): 5–13.
- Innes, Christopher, ed. 2000. A Sourcebook on Naturalist Theatre. London and New York: Routledge. ISBN 0-415-15229-1.
- Krasner, David, ed. 2000. Method Acting Reconsidered: Theory, Practice, Future. New York: St. Martin's P. ISBN 978-0-312-22309-0.
- Leach, Robert. 1989. Vsevolod Meyerhold. Directors in perspective ser. Cambridge: Cambridge UP. ISBN 0-521-31843-2.
- Leach, Robert. 2004. Makers of Modern Theatre: An Introduction. London: Routledge. ISBN 0-415-31241-8.
- Leach, Robert, and Victor Borovsky, eds. 1999. A History of Russian Theatre. Cambridge: Cambridge UP. ISBN 0-521-43220-0.
- Magarshack, David. 1950. Stanislavsky: A Life. London and Boston: Faber, 1986. ISBN 0-571-13791-1.
- Markov, Pavel Aleksandrovich. 1934. The First Studio: Sullerzhitsky-Vackhtangov-Tchekhov. Trans. Mark Schmidt. New York: Group Theatre.
- Meyerhold, Vsevolod. 1991. Meyerhold on Theatre. Ed. and trans. Edward Braun. Revised edition. London: Methuen. ISBN 0-413-38790-9.
- Milling, Jane, and Graham Ley. 2001. Modern Theories of Performance: From Stanislavski to Boal. Basingstoke, Hampshire and New York: Palgrave. ISBN 0-333-77542-2.
- Poliakova, Elena I[vanovna]. 1982. Stanislavsky. Trans. Liv Tudge. Moscow: Progress. . Trans. of Stanislavskii. Moscow: Iskusstvo, 1977.
- Ribot, Théodule-Armand. 2006. The Diseases of the Will. Trans. Merwin-Marie Snell. London: Kessinger Publishing's Legacy Reprints. ISBN 1-4254-8998-2. Online edition available.
- Ribot, Théodule-Armand. 2007. Diseases of Memory: An Essay in the Positive Psychology. London: Kessinger Publishing's Legacy Reprints. ISBN 1-4325-1164-5. Online edition available.
- Roach, Joseph R. 1985. The Player's Passion: Studies in the Science of Acting. Theater:Theory/Text/Performance Ser. Ann Arbor: U of Michigan P. ISBN 0-472-08244-2.
- Rudnitsky, Konstantin. 1981. Meyerhold the Director. Trans. George Petrov. Ed. Sydney Schultze. Revised translation of Rezhisser Meierkhol'd. Moscow: Academy of Sciences, 1969. ISBN 0-88233-313-5.
- Rudnitsky, Konstantin. 1988. Russian and Soviet Theatre: Tradition and the Avant-Garde. Trans. Roxane Permar. Ed. Lesley Milne. London: Thames and Hudson. Rpt. as Russian and Soviet Theater, 1905–1932. New York: Abrams. ISBN 0-500-28195-5.
- Schuler, Catherine A. 1996. Women in Russian Theatre: The Actress in the Silver Age. London and New York: Routledge. ISBN 0-415-11105-6.
- Taxidou, Olga. 1998. The Mask: A Periodical Performance by Edward Gordon Craig. Contemporary Theatre Studies ser. volume 30. Amsterdam: Harwood Academic Publishers. ISBN 978-90-5755-046-1.
- Toporkov, Vasily Osipovich. 2001. Stanislavski in Rehearsal: The Final Years. Trans. Jean Benedetti. London: Methuen. ISBN 0-413-75720-X.
- Whyman, Rose. 2008. The Stanislavsky System of Acting: Legacy and Influence in Modern Performance. Cambridge: Cambridge UP. ISBN 978-0-521-88696-3.
- Worrall, Nick. 1996. The Moscow Art Theatre. Theatre Production Studies ser. London and NY: Routledge. ISBN 0-415-05598-9.
