= Yevgeny Vakhtangov =

Russian actor and theatre director

- Евгений Вахтангов
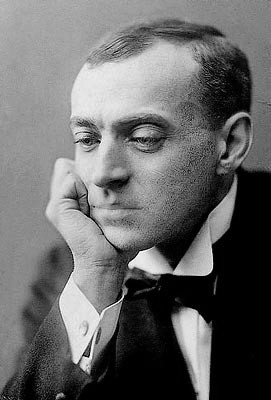
- Born: Yevgeny Bagrationovich Vakhtangov; 1 February 1883; Vladikavkaz, Terek Oblast, Russian Empire
- Died: 29 May 1922 (aged 39); Moscow, Russian SFSR
- Occupations: Actor; theatre director
- Years active: 1911–1922

Yevgeny Bagrationovich Vakhtangov (also spelled Evgeny or Eugene; Russian: Евге́ний Багратио́нович Вахта́нгов; 13 February 1883 – 29 May 1922) was a Russian actor and theatre director who founded the Vakhtangov Theatre. He was a friend and mentor of Michael Chekhov. He is known for his distinctive style of theatre, his most notable production being Princess Turandot in 1922.

== Early life and education ==
Vakhtangov was born to an Armenian father and a Russian mother in Vladikavkaz, Terek Oblast (now the capital of Northern Ossetia). He was educated at Moscow State University for a short time before joining the Moscow Art Theatre in 1911.

== Career ==
Vakhtangov rose in the ranks at the Moscow Art Theatre, and by 1920 he was in charge of his own theatre studio. Four years after his death, the studio was named Vakhtangov Theatre in his honor.

=== Technique ===
Vakhtangov was greatly influenced both by the theatrical experiments of Vsevolod Meyerhold and the more psychological techniques of his teachers, Konstantin Stanislavski and Leopold Sulerzhitsky, and the co-founder of the MAT Vladimir Nemirovich-Danchenko. His productions incorporated masks, music, dance, abstract costume, avant-garde sets as well as a detailed analysis of the texts of plays and the psychological motivations of its characters.

On the Actors Studio webpage, Lee Strasberg is quoted as saying: "If you examine the work of the Stanislavski System as made use of by Stanislavski, you see one result. If you examine it in the work of one of his great pupils, Vakhtangov — who influenced our thinking and activity — you will see a completely different result. Vakhtangov's work was skillfully done, his use of the Method even more brilliant and more imaginative than Stanislavski’s, and yet Vakhtangov achieved totally different results."

The German theatre practitioner Bertolt Brecht argued that Vakhtangov's approach was "the Stanislavski-Meyerhold complex before the split rather than its reconciliation". Brecht outlined the main aspects of Vakhtangov's work as:

1. Theatre is theatre.
2. The how, not the what.
3. More composition.
4. Greater inventiveness and imagination.

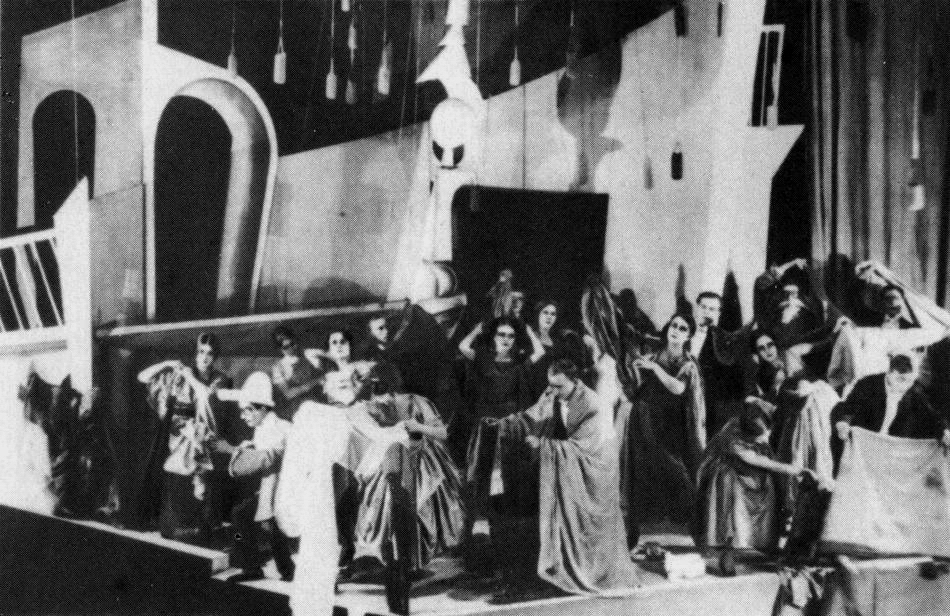
Carlo Gozzi´s Princess Turandot, performance by Yevgeny Vakhtangov (1922)

He identifies a commonality with his own 'demonstrating' element in acting, but argues that Vakhtangov's method lacks the social insight and pedagogical function of Brecht's own Gestic form: "when Vakhtangov's actor says 'I'm not laughing, I'm demonstrating laughter', one still doesn't learn anything from his demonstration".

=== Notable productions ===
His most notable production was Princess Turandot, based on the play Turandot by Carlo Gozzi, which has played at the Vakhtangov Theatre ever since 1922 (the year of his death).

Another famous production directed by Vakhtangov in the same year was S. An-sky's The Dybbuk with the Habimah theater troupe.

== Death and legacy ==
Vakhtangov died of cancer. The later part of his career took place at a high point of Russian theatre, amidst the Bolshevik Revolution and Civil War.

In 2017, film director Qmars Mootab made a documentary film about him, Vakhtangov.

== Bibliography ==
- Евгений Вахтангов. Документы и свидетельства: В 2 т. / Ред.-сост В.В. Иванов; ред. М.В. Львова, М.В. Хализева. М.: Индрик, 2011. Т. 1 – 519 с., илл.; Т. 2 – 686 с., илл.
- Евгений Вахтангов в театральной критике / Ред.-сост. В.В. Иванов. М.: Театралис, 2016. – 703 с.; илл.

== See also ==
- Vsevolod Meyerhold State Theatre
