= Ellen Franz =

- Helene; Freifrau von Heldburg
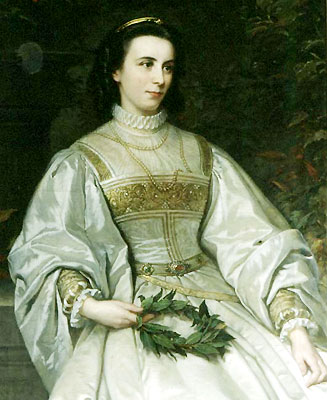
- Portrait by Oskar Begas, 1870
- Born: 30 May 1839; Naumburg
- Died: 24 March 1923 (aged 83); Meiningen
- Burial: Meininger Park Churchyard
- Spouse: Georg II, Duke of Saxe-Meiningen (m. 1873; died 1914)
- Father: Hermann Franz
- Mother: Sarah Grant

Ellen Franz, also known as Helene, Baroness von Heldburg (30 May 1839 – 24 March 1923) was a German pianist and actress.

== Biography ==
=== Early life ===
She was born in Berlin. According to Friedrich Martin von Bodenstedt, Ellen Franz made her first appearance in the Hoftheater of Meiningen in 1867.

=== Marriage ===
On 18 March 1873 she married, as his third wife, Georg II, Duke of Saxe-Meiningen, in the Villa Feodora in Bad Liebenstein. Because of her bourgeois origin, the Duke ennobled her shortly before their marriage, as Baroness von Heldburg, the title by which she was henceforth known. This morganatic marriage annoyed the German Emperor Wilhelm II so much that because of his aversion towards Helene he decided not to visit the Schloss Altenstein after the reconstruction undertaken by Georg II and completed in 1889.

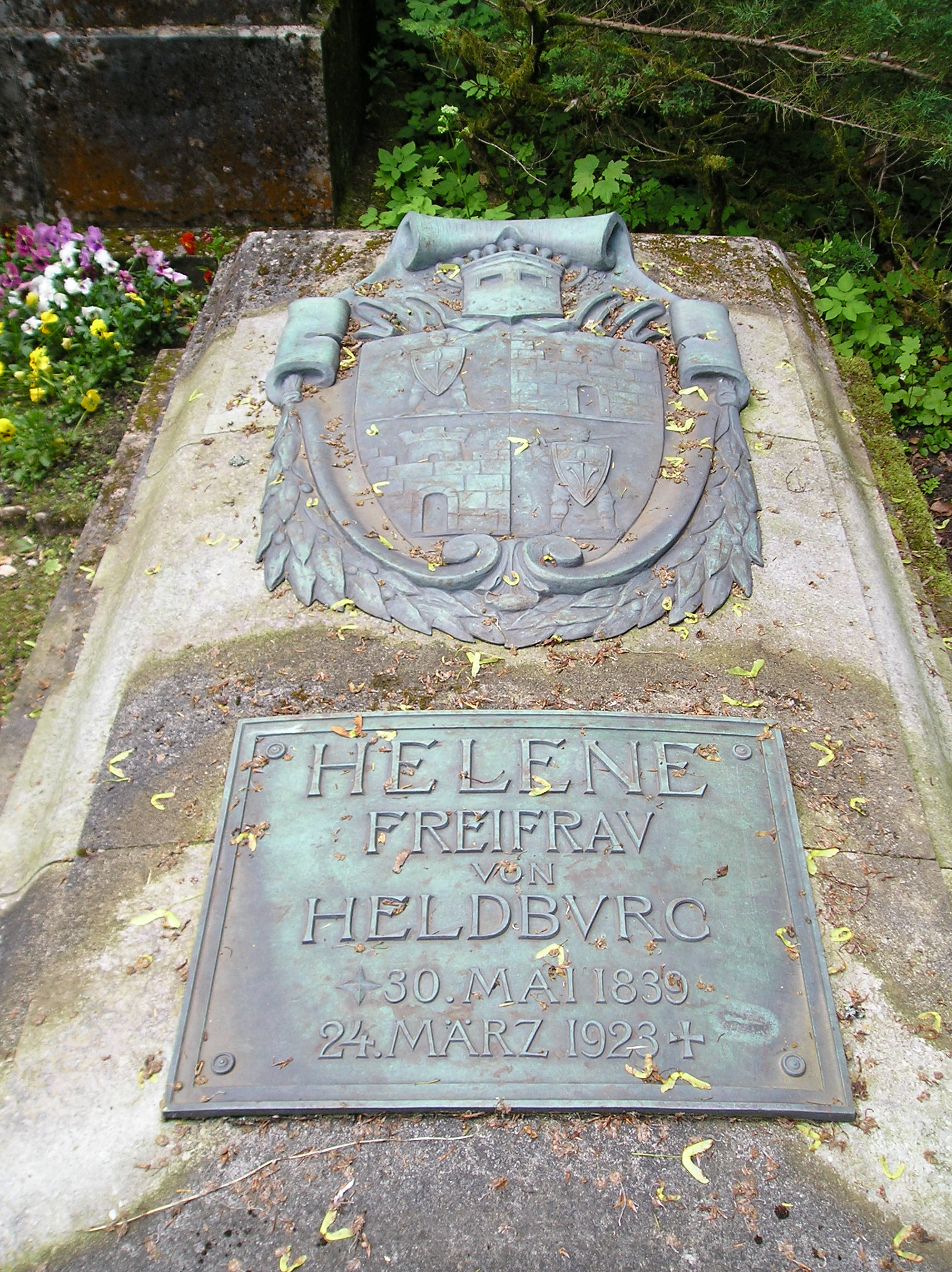
Tombstone of Freifrau Helene of Heldburg at Meininger Park Churchyard.

=== Development of Meiningen Theatre ===
The Duke and she, together with the Director Ludwig Chronegk, established the "Meiningen Principles" (Meininger Prinzipien), a profound reform in theatrical practice, and created what would become the world-famous Meiningen Ensemble (Meininger Hoftheater). Helene also implemented major changes in the dramaturgy, as well as being responsible for commitment and cast decisions and the education of young students. Her husband Georg II together with Chronegk undertook the direction, and decided on the appropriate scenery and costumes.

After the death of her husband in 1914, Helene retired to her country seat, the Veste Heldburg. From 1918 she lived in the palace "Helenenstift", her widow's residence built in 1891/92. She died in the year 1923, aged eighty-three, in Meiningen. She was buried near the Duke Georg II in a common grave arrangement in the Meininger Park Churchyard (Meininger Parkfriedhof).

== Bibliography ==
- Ludwig Eisenberg: Großes biographisches Lexikon der Deutschen Bühne im XIX. Jahrhundert. edited by Paul List, Leipzig 1903, p. 279. online
- Eva Hoffmann-Aleith: Ellen Franz, Evangelische Verlagsanstalt Berlin, 1989, ISBN 3-374-00808-9
- Hans Knudsen (1961). "Franz, Ellen". Neue Deutsche Biographie (in German). Vol. 5. Berlin: Duncker & Humblot. pp. 374–374. (full text online).
- Kuratorium Meiningen (ed): Lexikon zur Stadtgeschichte Meiningen. Bielsteinverlag, Meiningen 2008, ISBN 978-3-9809504-4-2.
- Norbert Klaus Fuchs: Das Heldburger Land–ein historischer Reiseführer; ed. Rockstuhl, Bad Langensalza 2013, ISBN 978-3-86777-349-2
