= Meiningen Ensemble =

Influential 19th Century German theatre company

The Meiningen Ensemble, also known as the Meiningen Company, was a troupe of actors led by the Duke of Saxe-Meiningen, his wife Ellen Franz, and Ludwig Chronegk. The group operated from about 1860 to 1890. The Meininger company had great influence in the Western World as it developed theatrical realism, the creative and interpretive role of the director, and the use of ensemble acting.

Meiningen company productions used the approach of Gesamtkunstwerk, or "total work of art," which involves an expanded creative process that unifies disciplines, such as sets, lighting, acting, music, song, and dance, into a dynamic whole.

In 1874, the Meininger company appeared in Berlin. It performed at London's Drury Lane in Julius Caesar, Twelfth Night, and The Winter's Tale during 1881. The company toured widely until 1890, when Chronegk's health failed.

The company's methodology had a great influence on Ibsen, Antoine, and Stanislavski.
