= Leopold Sulerzhitsky =

Russian theatre director, painter and pedagogue (1872–1916)

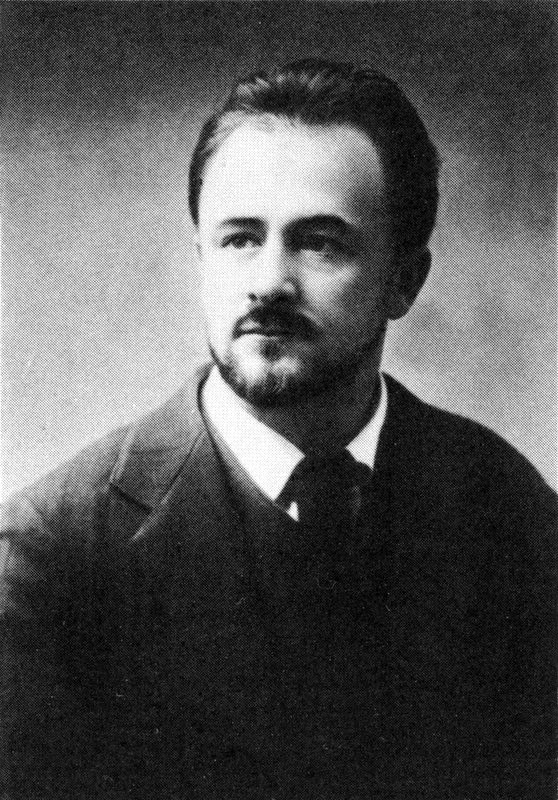
Leopold Sulerzhitsky (or "Suler" as Gorky nicknamed him) in 1910. Suler led the MAT's First Studio and taught the elements of the 'system' to its members.

Leopold Antonovich Sulerzhitsky (Russian: Леопольд Антонович Сулержицкий; 27 September 1872 – 30 December 1916) was a Russian theatre director, painter and pedagogue of Polish descent. He is associated with the Moscow Art Theatre and the household of Leo Tolstoy. Among his many students were Yevgeny Vakhtangov and Michael Chekhov.

== Biography ==
A native of Zhitomir, Sulerzhitsky pursued study of the visual arts in Kiev. As a schoolboy, he was involved in decorating the Cathedral of Saint Vladimir in Kiev, working under the likes of Mikhail Vrubel and Viktor Vasnetsov. In 1890, he joined the Stroganov Art School in Moscow but dropped out four years later, due to his "anti-government escapades." Sulerzhitsky, always a colourful personality, turned his attention to theatre and soon became a fixture of Moscow artistic life.

Tatyana Tolstaya, one of his schoolmates, introduced him to her famous father. Sulerzhitsky grew fascinated with Leo Tolstoy's ideas of pacifism and anarchism and decided to dedicate his life to their dissemination. He became one of the most loyal Tolstoyans. His diary kept track of early Doukhobor life before, during, and just after the Doukhobor's migration to Canada at the beginning of the twentieth century. The published diary is called To America with the Doukhobors.

Sulerzhitsky contributed greatly to the construction of one of the most successful actor training techniques in the world. He worked with Konstantin Stanislavski for many years. In his book on Stanislavski's 'system', Mel Gordon attributes its founding to Stanislavski's nine-year relationship with Suler. He was well versed in Eastern-influenced religious practices, informing Stanislavski about yoga, meditation and the nature of Prana. From its founding in 1912 until Sulerzhitsky's death in December 1916, the First Studio of the Moscow Art Theatre, led by Sulerzhitsky, developed Stanislavski's ideas through classes, workshops, and rehearsals.
