= Psycho-physical Awareness =

Psycho-physical Awareness is a popular acting technique used in many schools and universities in the U.S. and Europe. This technique works on the relationship between the mind and the body and at developing an actor’s conscious awareness. In other words, recognizing the resulting sensory and mental states in reaction to physical stimuli. The pioneer of this technique is Konstantin Stanislavski who sought to overcome the divisions between “mind from body, knowledge from feeling, analysis from action” through psychophysical training or the method of physical action, but it was Michael Chekhov who further developed an original and dependable method of what we now know to be psycho-physical awareness.

== History ==
Based on the ideas of Konstantin Stanislavski, Michael Chekhov developed the technique in order to achieve the highest creative potential by developing extreme sensitivity of the body to the psychological creative impulses. He felt this was imperative in becoming an ‘ideal’ actor.

Chekhov developed a series of exercises influenced in part by Rudolf Steiner, which explore a psychophysical approach to training and performing. “If the actor is engaged in the process of imagining through the body, then their sense of ‘self’ is forgotten, and the embodied imagination alters the psycho physicality to be or become that of the character.”

Other notable pioneers and practitioners in this field include Phillip B. Zarrilli and Jerzy Grotowski.

Zarilli’s most recent book, Psychophysical Acting: An Intercultural Approach after Stanislavski (2008) has been selected for the 2010 Outstanding Book award for the Association for Theatre in Higher Education (ATHE). Zarilli developed a system of training though yoga and Asian martial arts that heightens sensory awareness, dynamic energy, and in which body and mind become one.

Jerzy Grotowski is known for using yoga as well as plastiques (a series of strenuous postures, gesture and tumbles) and the use of the whole body as a vocal resonator. He later found that adding human interaction (working with partners) loosened creativity and challenged the body more psychologically. Solo yoga postures he found to be limiting and isolating.

An example of plastiques involves the vertebra extracted from Grotowski’s Towards a Poor Theatre, clarifies the connection between emotional and physical states of the actor. The energy must first start physically within for it to find its way out through expression, thereby engaging the need for psycho-physical awareness.

The vertebral column is the center of expression. The driving impulse, however stems from the loins. Every live impulse begins in this region, even if it is invisible from the outside.

Other physical acting training techniques relative to personal awareness, but not limited to, can be found in the exercises of Moshe Feldenkrais, Kristin Linklater, Cicely Berry and Frederick Matthias Alexander.
