= Theatre practitioner =

Person involved with theatre performance and/or theory

A theatre practitioner is someone who creates theatrical performances and/or produces a theoretical discourse that informs their practical work. A theatre practitioner may be a director, dramatist, actor, designer or a combination of these traditionally separate roles. Theatre practice describes the collective work that various theatre practitioners do.

The term was not ordinarily applied to theatre-makers before the rise of modernism in the theatre. Instead, theatre praxis from Konstantin Stanislavski's development of his system is described through Vsevolod Meyerhold's biomechanics, Antonin Artaud's Theatre of cruelty, Bertolt Brecht's epic, and Jerzy Grotowski's poor theatre. Contemporary theatre practitioners include Augusto Boal with his Theatre of the Oppressed, Dario Fo's popular theatre, Eugenio Barba's theatre anthropology, Jacques Lecoq's physical theatre, Philippe Gaulier's 'le jeu' and theatre of pleasure, and Anne Bogart's viewpoints.
