= Guy Gillette (photographer) =

American photojournalist (1922–2013)

- Born: October 22, 1922; Minneapolis, US
- Died: August 19, 2013 (aged 90); New York City
- Education: autodidact
- Known for: Photography
- Spouse: Doris Porter Gillette (m. 1942; died 2012)

Guy Gillette (October 22, 1922 – August 19, 2013) was an American 20th century photojournalist.

== Early life ==
Gillette was born in Minneapolis, and his youthful years were peripatetic because of his father's occupation. Initially he studied acting under Michael Chekhov, a Russian-American theatre practitioner and was in several Broadway plays. Drafted in 1942, but not in action in World War 2, he later photographed for the Red Cross for three months at the front during the Korean War, achieving the Missouri School of Journalism award for best picture story for the work. He documented the Civil rights movement and the anti-Vietnam War demonstrations in the 1960s.

While working at a restaurant in New York City, Gillette met Doris Porter, a fashion design student of Lovelady, daughter of V. H. "Hoyt" and Lucy Porter. He took photographs in the 1940s at the Porter Place, the ranch his future in-laws owned near Crockett in East Texas, documenting cattle farming, the family, and small-town life. The pictures provided Gillette with an entree into journalism and he continued to photograph at the ranch throughout his career.

His first work was published in 1947 in trade journals, including Sales Management, before being included in more prestigious publications The New York Times and magazines including Fortune, Life, Look, Theater Arts, Dance Magazine, Harper's Bazaar and Collier's. He was a contestant in LIFE's 1951 photo contest, in which he won an Honorable Mention.

Edward Steichen included his image of a father and two sons sitting at the counter in Arnold's Café, Lovelady, Texas in the Museum of Modern Art's world-touring 1955 exhibition, The Family of Man which was seen by 10 million visitors.

In 1957, Jacob Deschin, camera editor of The New York Times, remarked that Gillette's "pictures were made with conviction. He photographed an important event rich in dramatic sidelights on every hand, including that most important of all elements in the photographer's attitude—personal involvement in the photographic experience itself." From editorial work he moved later in life to commercial photography.

== Portraits ==
In the course of his magazine photography Gillette photographed Elvis Presley, Audrey Hepburn, Elizabeth II, Dwight D. Eisenhower, Agnes de Mille, Lillian and Dorothy Gish, Sarah Vaughan, Johnny Cash, Jacqueline Susann, Marian Anderson, Henri Cartier-Bresson and Jacqueline Kennedy Onassis.

== Death and legacy ==
Gillette died aged 90 on August 19, 2013, predeceased the year before by his wife of 70 years, Doris (née Porter), and survived by his sons Guy and Pipp. He saw an advance copy of the book, A Family of the Land: The Texas Photography of Guy Gillette, published through the University of Oklahoma Press, but died before its publication. Gillette's photographs continue to be published.

== Exhibitions ==
- 1955, January 24 – May 8: The Family of Man. The Museum of Modern Art, New York
- 2006: Guy Gillette. Hudson River Museum
- 2010, January: On the Town. Monroe Gallery, Santa Fe, New Mexico
- 2016, July 1 – September 18: The American Family Album: Wanderlust and encounters of the American family in pictures. Monroe Gallery, Santa Fe, New Mexico
- June 17, 2022 – September 3, 2023: Order/ Reorder: Experiments with Collections. Hudson River Museum

== Collections ==
- The Museum of Modern Art, New York
- Hudson River Museum
- Monroe Gallery, Santa Fe, New Mexico
- Holden Luntz Gallery
