= Ludwig Chronegk =

German actor and director (1837–1891)

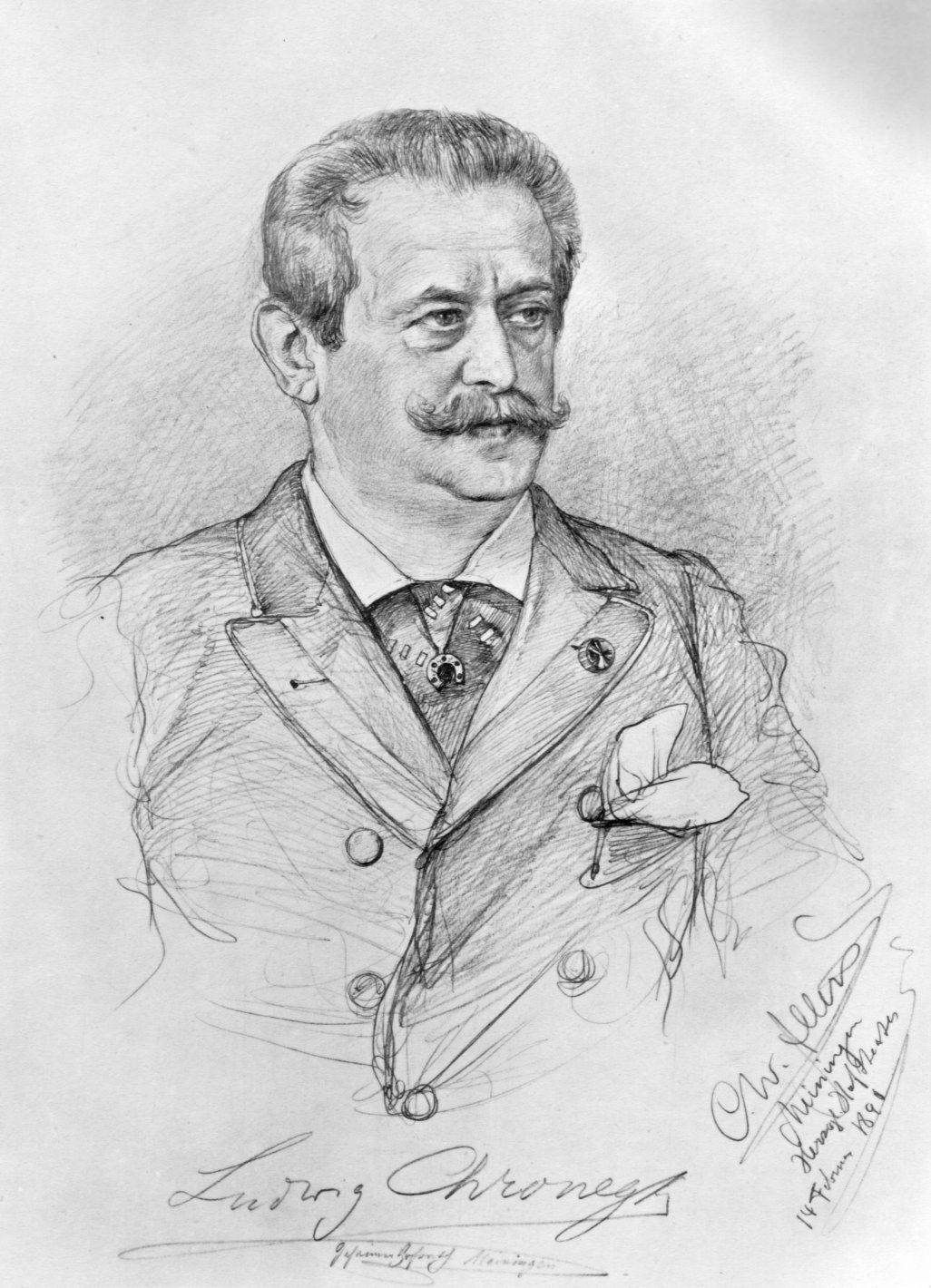
Ludwig Chronegk, 1890, by C.W.Allers

Ludwig Chronegk (3 November 1837, Brandenburg an der Havel – 8 July 1891, Meiningen) was a German actor and director. He headed the Meiningen Ensemble and reformed theatre direction principles.

== Life ==
Chronegk came from a mercantile family and was educated in the gymnasiums in Berlin and Potsdam before going to study the French theatre in Paris for a year. On his return to Germany, he was inspired to begin a career on the stage by Karl August Görner. He acted his first role in 1856 at the Krollschen Theater in Berlin. A member of the Meininger Hoftheater until 1866, Chronegk also appeared in or at Liegnitz and Görlitz, various theatres in Berlin, the Hamburg Thalia, the theatres in Pest, Breslau, Königsberg and the Leipzig Stadttheater.

In 1874 Chronegk officially began work as a director. He gave up his acting work in 1877 – he had been seen in all the comic roles - to devote himself to being a director. That same year he became Chief Director and Head (and, from 1884, Intendant) of the Meininger Hoftheater. With artistically-ambitious duke Georg II and his wife Ellen Franz, Chronegk created the 'Meiningen principles', leading to a profound reform of the art of direction. Under his leadership, he took the Hoftheater company on many tours across Europe as the Meiningen Ensemble, making his reforms known throughout the continent and making them the foundations of reforms in the rest of Europe. In 1886 Chronegk fell seriously ill and had to limit his direction of the tours, which finally ended in 1890. A street was named after him in the centre of Meiningen in 1901.

== Bibliography ==
- (in German) Alfred Erck: Geschichte des Meininger Theaters, Das Meininger Theater 2006.
