= Eva Hoffmann-Aleith =

- Born: Renate Eva Olga Aleith; 26 October 1910; Bergfeld, Posen, Germany
- Died: 24 February 2004 (aged 93); Kloster Marienfließ (Prignitz), Brandenburg, Germany
- Occupations: Protestant pastor theologian author
- Spouse(s): 1. Wilhelm Hoffmann; 2. Fritz Hempel

Eva Hoffmann-Aleith (26 October 1910 - 24 February 2004) was a German evangelical pastor, teacher and author. As a woman pastor undertaking what was widely seen as a man's job she became a pioneer and a role model for successor generations.

== Life ==
Renate Eva Olga Aleith was born in Bergfeld, a small town in the Bromberg district of what was at that time the Prussian Province of Posen. She grew up in Berlin, where she attended the Friedrich-Wilhelms-Universität, embarking on a degree in Philosophy. She quickly switched to Evangelical Theology. She passed the necessary exams and went on to receive her doctorate by 1937 for a piece of work on church history. Her dissertation was supervised by Hans Lietzmann and concerned understanding of the Apostle, Paul, during the first and second centuries. It might have been assumed that she would now progress her career as an academic, but in the event she completed a practical term as a trainee pastor even though, in the context of the time and place, there was no prospect of a woman being appointed by the church to take charge of a parish. Even fully qualified women pastors were restricted, under the regulations, to looking after the pastoral needs of "women, girls and children".

In 1938 she married Wilhelm Hoffmann, and together they moved to his new parish at Hohenwerbig (Fläming), a rural parish to the south-west of Berlin. The marriage remained childless.

War broke out in September 1939. Wilhelm Hoffmann was conscripted into the army in June 1940. His young wife stayed behind in the parish as his "pastoral assistant" ("geistliche Hilfskraft"). Shortly after this Wilhelm Hoffmann was transferred, in his absence, to Stüdenitz, another rural parish not too far from Berlin. Eva moved into the rectory with her parents and took on the pastoral duties which her husband would have undertaken in more normal times. After initial uncertainty over how she should be addressed, the parishioners took to addressing her respectfully as "Frau Doktor" (literally "Mrs. Doctor"). Along with her pastoral work she also taught at the village school as did her father. Her situation was far from unique: by 1943 she was one of ten qualified female pastors working in parishes in Brandenburg.

The Confessional Church ("Bekennende Kirche"), which had emerged during the 1930s as a response to government attempts to take over the churches, remained conflicted on gender issues. In 1942 it enacted a "regulation on women pastors" ("Vikarinnengesetz") which purported to create a separate and restricted category for women pastors. Kurt Scharf, a youthful but already prominent churchman (who later became the evangelical Bishop of Berlin-Brandenburg), reacted by ordaining Ilse Härter and Hannelotte Reiffen, two female theologians serving in community-based jobs. Eva Hoffmann-Aleith remained on the edge of the controversy. "I'm representing my husband" ("Ich vertrete meinen Mann") was her statement, quoted in 1942 in the journal "Die Theologin" ("The female Theologian").

The war ended in May 1945, leaving the entire central portion of Germany - including the Hoffmanns' home region of Brandenburg - administered as the Soviet occupation zone. Within the church many of the special arrangements that had operated during the war were rolled back. At the same time, the slaughter of war had left the country desperately short of men of working age, which affected the church just as it affected other sectors. In the Soviet zone the worker shortage was exacerbated by large numbers relocating to the western occupation zones, a trend which accelerated towards the end of the 1940s as the economic and political situations on what were becoming the "two halves of Germany" diverged more starkly. Wilhelm Hoffmann had been captured, and was held as a prisoner of war till 1947. In Stüdenitz Eva Hoffmann-Aleith accordingly continued to perform pastoral duties on his behalf during the postwar period. Pastor Wilhelm Hoffmann resumed his ministry in 1948, but later the same year he was suspended from his duties on account of "wartime offences". He crossed over to the west at around the same time that the Soviet occupation zone was relaunched as the Soviet sponsored German Democratic Republic (East Germany). The marriage between Wilhelm Hoffmann and Eva Hoffmann-Aleith ended in divorce, formally in 1950.

Meanwhile, it was Eva Hoffmann-Aleith who continued to perform the pastoral duties in the parish. From the outset she preached from the pulpit, as a "normal" male pastor would have done, rather than from the step in front of the altar. In the early days she dressed for services in a simple black dress with a short jacket, but in or before 1952 she was appearing in a more overtly clerical gown ("Talar"). Little by little church regulations in East Germany caught up with reality, progressively bringing the formal roles of male and female pastors closer together. There was a new set of regulations covering women pastors in 1952, to be followed by a "pastoral ordinance" in 1962. In 1952 the church "general superintendent"Walter Braun (1892–1973), a long time proponent of "women in the pulpits", formally ordained her in the newly redefined post of "woman pastor", and her role was accordingly "reconsecrated".

In 1953 she published a booklet under the title "Woman in the pulpit" ("Die Frau auf der Kanzel?"), a "plea for women in pastoral office". She published articles in newspapers and magazines on the same theme around this time. She pointed out that in the provinces there was no longer anything remarkable about women appearing in pulpits, especially in times of crisis. Persistent resistance from within the church hierarchy to female theologians entering the ministry came not from the bible, and the key to addressing it was to build up male self-knowledge. The habit of writing lasted. Between 1940- and 1998she published around a dozen historical biographies: most but not all of them were about women.

Eva Hoffmann-Aleith remarried in 1962/63. Her new husband, Fritz Hempel, was a theologian from Berlin. Initially he was a regular visitor to the rectory, but the couple never lived together on a long-term basis, and fairly soon the visits stopped. The two nevertheless remained formally married till Hempel's death in 1989. In her public life she rarely used the name "Hempel", and for her books and other writings she continued to publish under the name "Hoffmann-Aleith". Around the time she married Hempel she also, for the first time, obtained a driving license. From now on she made her way to services not in a traditional horse-cart but in her "company car", a Trabant. She gave the car a name, calling it "Herr Philippus" ("Mr. Philip"), after Philip Melanchthon, a prominent sixteenth century Protestant reformer about whom she published a book in 1961.

The gaunt "Frau Doktor" was respected in her parish, for her scholarship, for her austere domestic arrangements and for her notably assertive approach. "As a child I found her a very cold and unapproachable pastor", a former parishioner, Christiane Möbius, later asserted, recalling the ill-concealed coldness bordering on disapproval emanating from the pastor when performing a "house christening" at the Möbius family home. "But later I found her a very warm woman, especially in her own house ... when you rang the doorbell the first thing you heard was the dog snuffling, followed by gentle humming or singing as she came to the door".

Eva Hoffmann-Aleith formally retired in 1974 but continued to live at the rectory in Stüdenitz till shortly before her death in 2002. She spent her final months in a nearby retirement home.

== Publications (selection) ==
=== Historical biographies ===
- Amalie Sieveking. Vandenhoeck & Ruprecht, Göttingen 1940 (about Amalie Sieveking (1794–1859), die Gründerin des ersten Vereins für weibliche Krankenpflege).
- Tusnelda von Saldern, Vandenhoeck & Ruprecht, Göttingen 1940 (about Thusnelda von Saldern (1837–1910), Oberin des Oberlinhauses in Potsdam-Nowawes (Potsdam-Babelsberg)).
- Anna Melanchthon. Evangelische Verlagsanstalt, Berlin 1954; 8th edition 1983 (about Anna Melanchthon (1522–1547), daughter of the reformer Philipp Melanchthon).
- Herr Philippus. Erzählungen um Melanchthon. Evangelische Verlagsanstalt, Berlin 1960; 2. Auflage 1961 (about Philipp Melanchthon (1497–1560) reformer and backer of Martin Luther).
- Der Freiherr. Luther Verlag, Witten 1960 (about Carl Hildebrand von Canstein (1667–1719), founder of the Halleschen Bibelanstalt).
- Wege zum Lindenhof. Evangelische Verlagsanstalt, Berlin 1967; 4. Auflage 1985 (about Philipp and Marie Nathusius, founders of the Neinstedter Anstalten).
- Teufelszwirn. Evangelische Verlagsanstalt, Berlin 1970 (über einen Streit zwischen Pfarrer und Gutsherrn im Bautzener Land ums Wissebier und ums Tanzen).
- Frau von Friedland. Evangelische Verlagsanstalt, Berlin 1978; 2. Auflage 1981; Neuauflage: Förderkreis Barnim-Oderbruch e.V., Bad Freienwalde 1994 (about Helene Charlotte von Friedland (1754–1803), Progressive landowner-farmer).
- Johanne. Evangelische Verlagsanstalt, Berlin 1980; 2. Auflage 1987 (about Johanne Nathusius (1828–1885), sister of Philipp von Nathusius, founder of the Elisabeth-Stifts and other establishments in Neinstedt).
- Leuchtende Stunde. Evangelische Verlagsanstalt, Berlin 1984 (about the youth of the painter Julius Schnorr von Carolsfeld (1794–1872), who belonged to the „Lukasbrüder“ artists' circle - later known as the „Nazarenes“).
- Ellen Franz, Evangelische Verlagsanstalt, Berlin 1989 (über Ellen Franz (1839–1923), pianist and actress, later Freewoman of Heldburg).
- Ein Fräulein aus Weissenfels. Haag und Herchen, Frankfurt/Main 1992, ISBN 3-89228-777-5; 2. Aufl. 2007 (about Marie Louise von François (1817–1893), authoress in Weißenfels).
- Licht in der Nacht. Haag und Herchen, Frankfurt/Main 1998, ISBN 3-86137-666-0 (about the blind poet Ludwig Wucke (1807–1883) from Bad Salzungen).

=== Other works ===
- Das Paulusverständnis in der alten Kirche. de Gruyter, Berlin 1937.
- Tiere und Menschen, 11 Erzählungen, Verlag Haag und Herchen, Frankfurt/Main 1992.
- Statt Blumen, 15 Erzählungen, Verlag Haag und Herchen, Frankfurt/Main 1996.
- Eine Kanne Wasser. In: Mehr Frieden ist kein Wintermärchen, Anthologie, Verlag Haag und Herchen, Frankfurt/Main 1994.

A directory of her publications, which also include numerous articles and other contributions to church publications, from the period 1936 - 1995, has been compiled by Uwe Czubatynski and can be found in Archivbericht Nummer 6 / November 1996 (Archive report Number 6 / November 1996), published by the Evangelical Church in Berlin-Brandenburg ("Evangelische Kirche in Berlin-Brandenburg") (ed. Jürgen Stenzel) pp. 78–81.
