= Biomechanics (Meyerhold) =

System of actor training

Biomechanics was a system of actor training developed by Vsevolod Meyerhold. Its purpose was to widen the emotional potential of a theater piece and express thoughts and ideas that could not be easily presented through the naturalistic theater of the period.

The techniques of biomechanics were developed during the rehearsals of a series of plays directed by Meyerhold in the 1920s and 1930s when Socialist Realism was at its height in Russia. Biomechanics is a precursor to and influence on much of the 20th century's physical theatre.

Despite a lack of scenery in many of Meyerhold's plays, “if the actor remains on the bare stage, the greatness of the theater stays with him”. In a similar vein, Markov claims that the constructivists saw the stage “merely as a platform for showing off the external technique of the actor”. This facilitated Meyerhold's use of biomechanics, an acting system which relied on motion rather than language or illusion. Opposing the Stanislavsky System, which Meyerhold believed “over emphasized the 'spirit' and 'psychologizing'”, biomechanics emphasized “elementary laws of reflexes”. In addition to the scenery facilitating this technique, the costumes were also integral. In constructivist fashion, the costumes were not extravagant, but drastically simplified, which allowed the actors to easily perform using biomechanics and without hiding mistakes. This method of acting lends itself very well to the constructivist style of being basic and as straightforward as possible.

Meyerhold's success with biomechanics played a large role in the introduction of “physical training into the curriculum of every Soviet drama school”. Physical training for actors is an aspect that is still employed today, especially for actors who participate in dance numbers and musicals.
