= Art of representation =

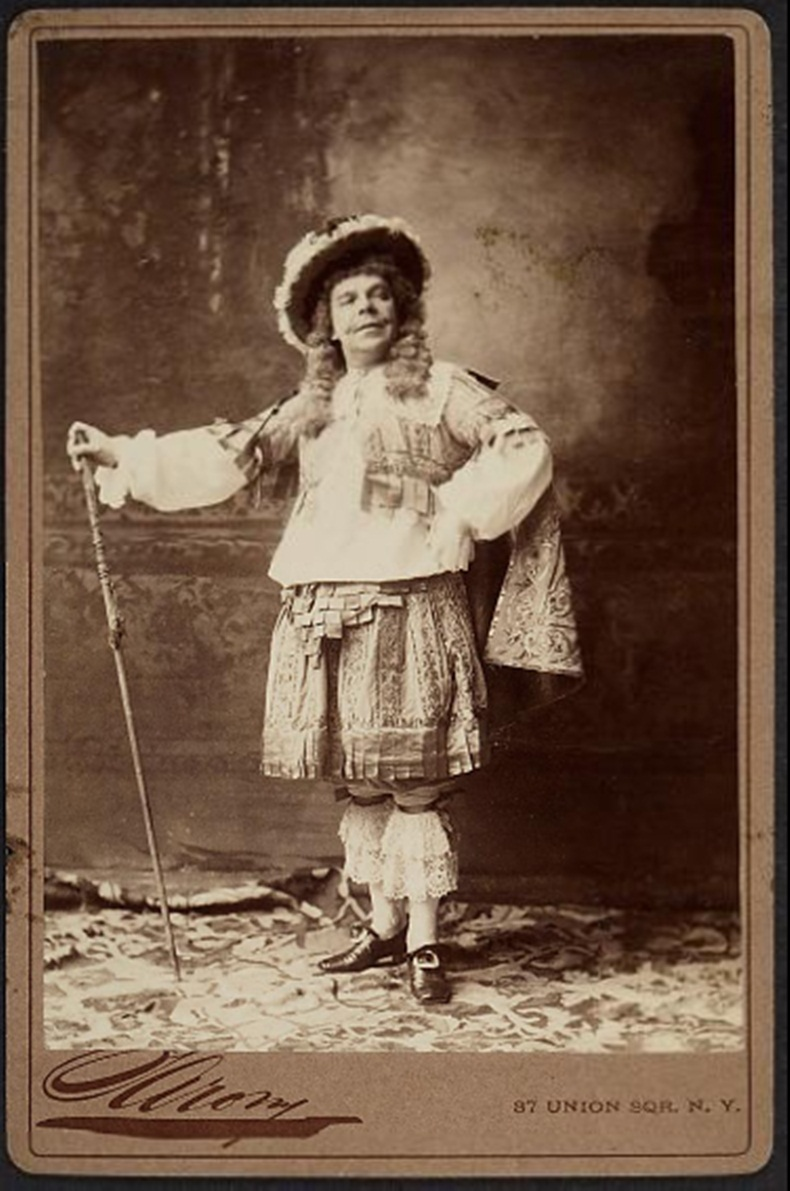
Stanislavski considered the French actor Coquelin (1841–1909) to be one of the best examples of "an artist of the school of representation".

The "art of representation" (Russian: представление, romanized: predstavlenie) is a critical term used by the seminal Russian theatre practitioner Konstantin Stanislavski to describe a method of acting. It comes from his acting manual An Actor Prepares (1936). Stanislavski defines his own approach to acting as "experiencing the role" and contrasts it with the "art of representation". It is on the basis of this formulation that the American Method acting teacher Uta Hagen defines her recommended Stanislavskian approach as 'presentational' acting, as opposed to 'representational' acting. This use, however, directly contradicts mainstream critical use of these terms. Despite the distinction, Stanislavskian theatre, in which actors 'experience' their roles, remains 'representational' in the broader critical sense.

== 'Experiencing' and 'representing' ==
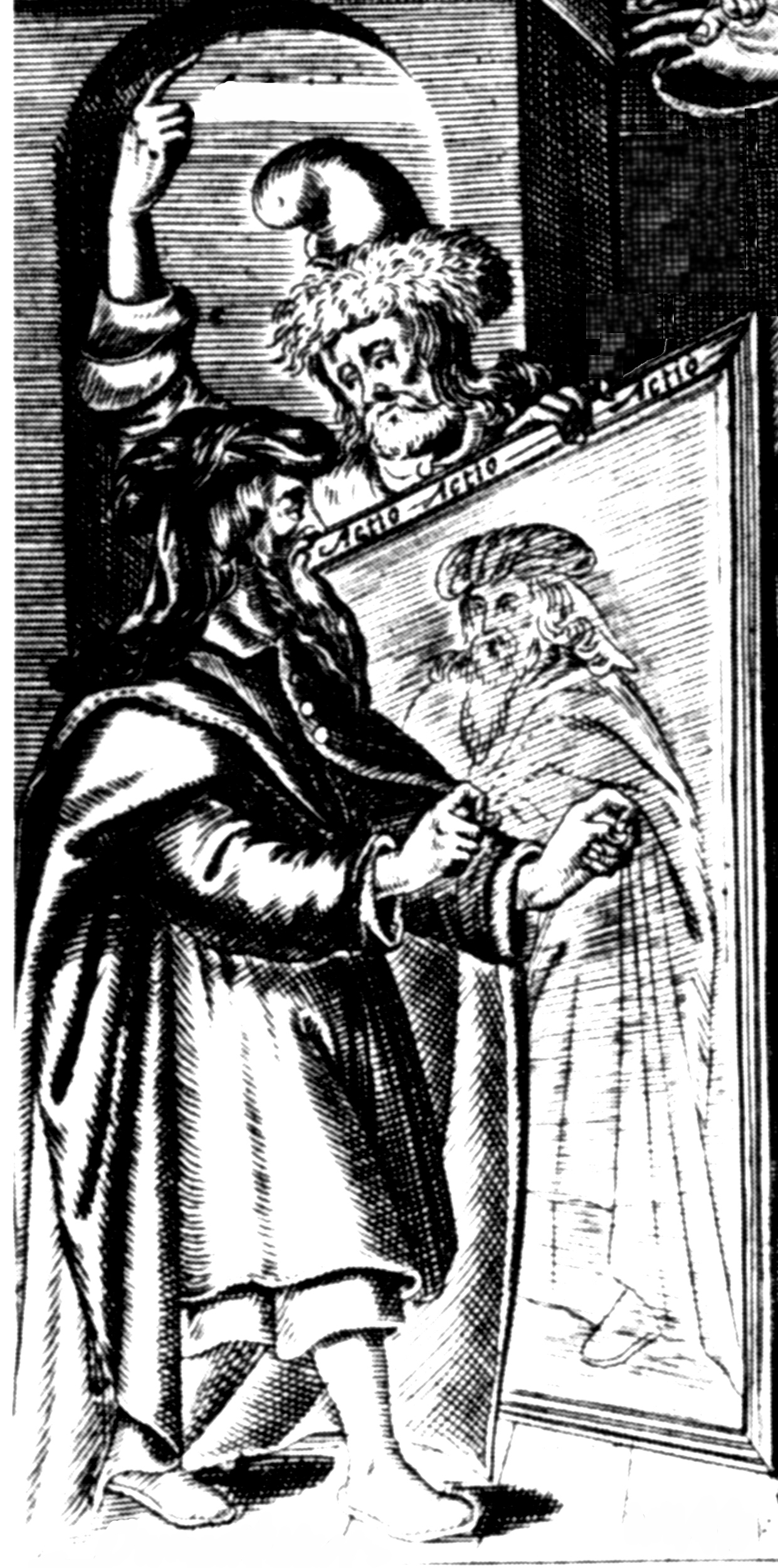
Preparing a rhetorical performance before a mirror. The 'inner' experience may be supplemented by an 'outside' perspective on the role in the 'art of representation' approach to acting.

In "When Acting is an Art", having watched his students' first attempts at a performance, Stanislavski's fictional persona Tortsov offers a series of critiques, during the course of which he defines different forms and approaches to acting. They are: 'forced acting', 'overacting', 'the exploitation of art', 'mechanical acting', 'art of representation', and his own 'experiencing the role'. One symptom of the recurrent myopic ideological bias displayed by commentators schooled in the American Method is their frequent confusion of the first five of these categories with one another; Stanislavski, however, goes to some lengths to insist that two of them deserve to be evaluated as 'Art' (and only two of them): his own approach of 'experiencing the role' and that of the 'art of representation'.

In Stanislavski's estimation, the crucial difference between the two approaches that are worthy to be considered 'Art' lies not in what an actor does when preparing for a role during the rehearsal process but rather what they do during their performance of that role before an audience.

During rehearsals, Stanislavski argues, both approaches make use of a process of 'living the part', in which the actor becomes "completely carried away by the play ..., not noticing how he [sic] feels, not thinking about what he does, and it all moves of its own accord, subconsciously and intuitively." The actor immerses themselves in the character's experience of the fictional reality in the play. In a state of absorption, the actor responds 'naturally' and 'organically' to that situation and the events that proceed from it (a 'natural' and 'organic' response conceived along lines originating from Pavlovian behaviourism and James-Lang via Ribot Psychophysiology). The two approaches diverge in the way this work relates to what an actor does during a performance.

In Stanislavski's own 'experiencing the role' approach, "you must live the part every moment that you are playing it, and every time. Each time it is recreated it must be lived afresh and incarnated afresh." As the repeated use of 'afresh' suggests, Stanislavski's approach retains a quality of improvisation in performance and strives to enable the actor to experience the emotions of the character on-stage (though emphatically not by means of focusing on those emotions).

In contrast, the approach that Stanislavski calls the 'art of representation' uses 'living the role' during rehearsals as "but one of the preparatory stages for further artistic work." The actor integrates the results of their 'living the part' from their rehearsal process into a finished artistic form (in contrast to the improvisatory quality of Stanislavski's approach). "The portrait ready, it needs only to be framed; that is, put on the stage." In performance, Stanislavski continues (quoting Coquelin), "the actor does not live, he plays. He remains cold toward the object of his acting but his art must be perfection." The actor does not focus on 'experiencing the role' afresh, but, instead, on its accuracy and artistic finish. This conception of the actor's work originates in the philosopher and dramatist Diderot's Paradox of Acting.

The distinction between Stanislavski's 'experiencing the role' and Coquelin's 'representing the part' turns on the relationship that the actor establishes with their character during the performance. In Stanislavski's approach, by the time the actor reaches the stage, they no longer experience a distinction between themselves and the character. The actor has created a third being, or a combination of the actor's personality and the role. (In Russian, Stanislavski calls this creation artisto-rol.) In the art of representation approach, while on-stage the actor experiences the distinction between the two. (Diderot describes this psychological duality as the actor's paradox.)
