= Robert Henderson (actor) =

American actor and director (1904–1985)

Robert Henderson (December 19, 1904 – September 9, 1985) was an American actor and director. He was known for Superman (1978), Superman III (1983), and Phase IV (1974).

Henderson was born in Ann Arbor, Michigan. His father was dean at the University of Michigan (UM).

He played an important role in the early career of Sean Connery. On a 2003 episode of Michael Parkinson's talk show, Sean Connery told Parkinson, and guests Boris Johnson and actor Ricky Tomlinson, that when he was touring as a chorus member in South Pacific, "An American actor in the cast, Robert Henderson, said to me 'Don't you want to be an actor,' and I said 'Me, an actor? What would I have to do?' And he said, 'First of all, you're totally illiterate. You will have to give yourself an education,' which I never had. So he gave me ten titles, that included all the plays of George Bernard Shaw, all of Shakespeare, An Actor Prepares, The Count of Monte Cristo, My Life in Art, Remembrance of Things Past. I read them all." (The full interview is available on YouTube).

In the fall of 1932, Henderson became manager of the Detroit Civic Theatre. In the early 1930s he began the Ann Arbor Festival, which began with one week of plays presented in the Lydia Mendelssohn Theater on the UM campus. By its fourth year it had expanded to five weeks. Actors, including those from Broadway, went to the campus to present plays.

Henderson directed a production of The Merry Wives of Windsor in Hollywood in 1937, and in 1938 he directed plays at His Majesty's Theatre in Montreal, Canada. On Broadway, he acted in The Tyrant (1930), Electra (1932), I Loved You Wednesday (1932), Strangers at Home (1934), and Tomorrow's Harvest (1934). Broadway productions that he produced, staged, or both included The Merry Wives of Windsor (1938), Wuthering Heights (1939), When We Are Married (1939), First Stop to Heaven (1941), The Duke in Darkness (1944), and It's a Gift (1945).

Henderson died in London, England.

== Filmography ==
Year	Title	Role	Notes
1950	Dance Hall	Special Dancer	Film debut
1952	Penny Princess	Macy's Staff Manager	Uncredited
1953	Never Let Me Go	U.S. Ambassador	
1953	36 Hours	Pop, the pilot	Uncredited
1955	Man of the Moment	American General	Uncredited
1957	The New Adventures of Charlie Chan	Herbert Stevenson	Episode: The Expatriate
1958	Orders to Kill	Col. Snyder	
1958	A Night to Remember	Mr. Harris	Uncredited
1960	Too Young to Love	Kellerer	
1964	Danger Man	Albert	Episode: Fish on the Hook
1969	Midas Run	The Dean	
1971	Moviemakers		
1974	Mousey	Attorney	TV movie
1974	Phase IV	Clete	
1978	Superman	2nd Editor (Daily Planet)	
1980	Oppenheimer	Scientist	Miniseries
1981	Ragtime	Elderly Man	
1983	Superman III	Mr. Simpson	
1985	Morons from Outer Space	Diner Customer	Final film
1985	Sherlock Holmes	American Millionaire	Episode: The Final Problem
