= HB Studio =

Herbert Berghof Studio
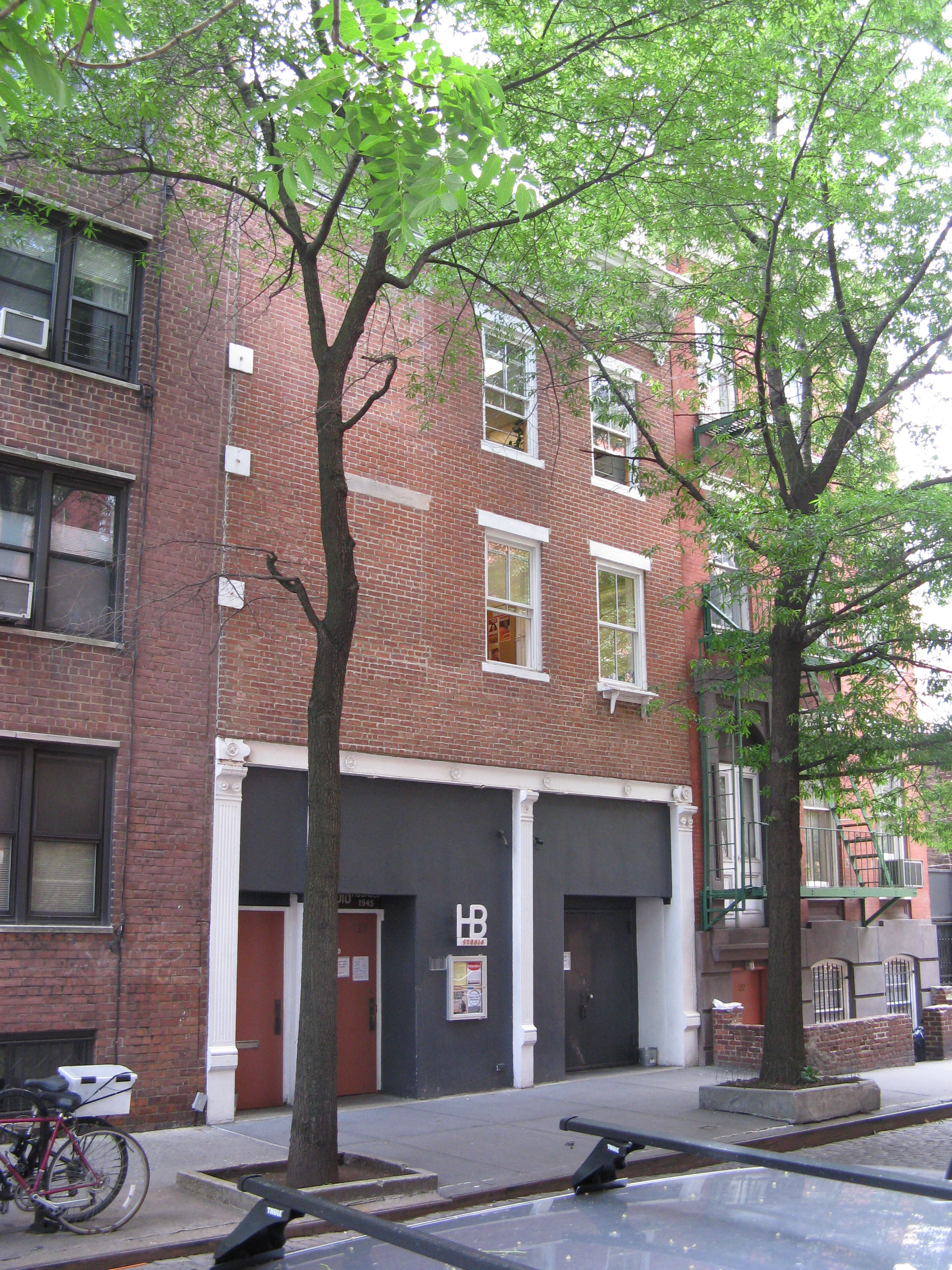

Location
- 120 Bank Street; Greenwich Village, New York City 10014; United States; 40°44′10.4″N 74°0′27.2″W

Information
- School type: Acting studio
- Founded: 1945; 81 years ago
- Founder: Herbert Berghof
- Website: www.hbstudio.org

HB Studio (Herbert Berghof Studio) is a non-profit 501(c)(3) organization offering professional training in the performing arts through classes, workshops, free lectures, theater productions, theater rentals, a theater artist residency program, as well as full-time study through their International Student Program and Uta Hagen Institute.

Located in Greenwich Village, New York City, HB Studio offers training and development to aspiring and professional artists in acting, directing, playwriting, musical theatre, movement and the body, dialect study (speech and voice), scene study analysis, screenwriting and classes for young people. Selected classes require an audition for admission.

== History ==
Founded in 1945 by Viennese-born American actor/director Herbert Berghof, HB Studio is one of the original New York acting studios, providing training and practice in the performing arts.

In 1948, Uta Hagen joined the Studio as Berghof's artistic partner, and the two wed ten years later. Her master classes led to the writing of her books Respect for Acting and A Challenge for the Actor.

In 2010, HB Studio founded the Uta Hagen Institute, which offers full-time immersion in the practical approach to acting craft that characterized Uta Hagen's master classes and classic acting texts. Its two key programs, The Hagen Summer Intensive and The Hagen Core Training, are highly structured, integrated courses for students with serious professional and artistic intent.

Past faculty members include William Hickey and Jack Hofsiss.

== Notable alumni ==
Notable alumni include:

=== A–G ===
- Caroline Aaron
- Christopher Abbott
- F. Murray Abraham
- Debbie Allen
- Rae Allen
- Mary Anthony
- Matthew Arkin
- Kerry Armstrong
- Blanche Baker
- Carroll Baker
- Bob Balaban
- Anne Bancroft
- Susan Batson
- Orson Bean
- Bonnie Bedelia
- Joy Behar
- Candice Bergen
- Emily Bergl
- Shelley Berman
- Felicia Montealegre Bernstein
- Clarice Blackburn
- Pamela Blair
- Stephen Bogardus
- Peter Boyle
- Matthew Broderick
- Leslie Browne
- Gary Burghoff
- K Callan
- Peggy Cass
- Justin Chambers
- Stockard Channing
- Dana Claxton
- Jill Clayburgh
- James Coco
- Kevin Conway
- James Cromwell
- Lindsay Crouse
- Billy Crystal
- Joseph Culp
- Robert Culp
- Claire Danes
- Hope Davis
- Drea de Matteo
- Robert De Niro
- Sandy Dennis
- Dena Dietrich
- Faye Dunaway
- Griffin Dunne
- Scott Ellis
- Laura Esterman
- Eva Evdokimova
- Barbara Feldon
- Tovah Feldshuh
- Katie Finneran
- Ellen Foley
- Constance Ford
- Victor Garber
- Rita Gardner
- Linda Geiser
- Whoopi Goldberg
- Tony Goldwyn
- Lee Grant
- Charles Grodin
- Kathryn Grody
- Stephen Adly Guirgis

=== H–M ===
- Desmond Harrington
- Kathryn Harrold
- Eileen Heckart
- Dan Hedaya
- David Hedison
- William Hickey
- Gerald Hiken
- George Roy Hill
- Pat Hingle
- Judd Hirsch
- Hal Holbrook
- Earle Hyman
- Anne Jackson
- Salome Jens
- Arnold Johnson
- Carol Kane
- Lainie Kazan
- Harvey Keitel
- Lisa Kirk
- Shirley Knight
- Juliane Köhler
- Harvey Korman
- Jane Krakowski
- Christine Lahti
- Zohra Lampert
- Jessica Lange
- Linda Lavin
- John Leguizamo
- Jack Lemmon
- Robert Sean Leonard
- Romulus Linney
- Joe Lisi
- Kenneth Lonergan
- Karen Ludwig
- Lorna Luft
- William H. Macy
- Lori March
- Nancy Marchand
- Marsha Mason
- Sheila McCarthy
- Paul McCrane
- Dylan McDermott
- Darren McGavin
- Donna McKechnie
- Steve McQueen
- Peter McRobbie
- Anne Meara
- Dina Merrill
- Bette Midler
- Penelope Ann Miller
- Liza Minnelli
- Alfred Molina
- Garrett Morris
- Jack Mullaney
- Tony Musante

=== N–Z ===
- Leonardo Nam
- Alfredo Narciso
- Kenneth Nelson
- Cynthia Nixon
- Jill O'Hara
- Rochelle Oliver
- Dael Orlandersmith
- Al Pacino
- Geraldine Page
- Betsy Palmer
- Joe Pantoliano
- Corey Parker
- Sarah Jessica Parker
- Amanda Peet
- Austin Pendleton
- Barry Primus
- Francesco Quinn
- Ellis Rabb
- Sheryl Lee Ralph
- Christopher Reeve
- Charles Nelson Reilly
- Carl Reindel
- Lee Richardson
- Peter Riegert
- Jason Robards
- Sam Robards
- Doris Roberts
- Suzzy Roche
- Paul Roebling
- Herbert Ross
- Mercedes Ruehl
- David Saint
- Eva Marie Saint
- James Saito
- Jaime Sánchez
- Prunella Scales
- Martha Schlamme
- Annabella Sciorra
- Kyra Sedgwick
- George Segal
- David Serero
- Molly Shannon
- Ray Sharkey
- Wallace Shawn
- Ron Silver
- Victor Slezak
- Anna Sokolow
- Gus Solomons Jr.
- June Squibb
- Maureen Stapleton
- Rod Steiger
- Daniel Stern
- Fisher Stevens
- Jerry Stiller
- Barbra Streisand
- Elaine Stritch
- Carol Ann Susi
- Kevin Sussman
- Marlo Thomas
- Lily Tomlin
- Tom Troupe
- Jo Van Fleet
- Betsy von Furstenberg
- Dee Wallace
- Emma Walton
- Jennifer Warren
- James Waterston
- Fritz Weaver
- Sigourney Weaver
- Peter Weller
- Jane White
- Mary Louise Wilson
- Gene Wilder
- Kelly Wolf
- Scott Wolf
- Rachel York
