= List of acting techniques =

The following is a partial list of major acting techniques.

== Techniques ==
- Classical acting is an umbrella term for a philosophy of acting that integrates the expression of the body, voice, imagination, personalizing, improvisation, external stimuli, and script analysis. It is based on the theories and systems of select classical actors and directors including Konstantin Stanislavski and Michel Saint-Denis.
- In Stanislavski's system, also known as Stanislavski's method, actors draw upon their own feelings and experiences to convey the "truth" of the character they are portraying. The actor puts themselves in the mindset of the character finding things in common in order to give a more genuine portrayal of the character.
- Method acting is a range of techniques used to assist acting persons in understanding, relating to and the portrayal of their character(s), as formulated by Lee Strasberg. Strasberg's method is based upon the idea that in order to develop an emotional and cognitive understanding of their roles, actors should use their own experiences to identify personally with their characters. It is based on aspects of Stanislavski's system. Other acting techniques are also based on Stanislavski's ideas, such as those of Stella Adler and Sanford Meisner, but these are not considered "method acting".
- Michael Chekhov developed an acting technique, a ‘psycho-physical approach’, in which transformation, working with impulse, imagination and inner and outer gesture are central. It offers clear and practical tools in working with imagination, feelings and atmosphere. This Creative Individuality allows the artist actor to use parts of themselves that are not just the smaller meaner more banal elements that make up their daily life, but rather parts of their unconscious, where dwell more universal and archetypal images. His acting technique has been used by actors such as Jack Nicholson, Clint Eastwood, Marilyn Monroe, and Yul Brynner.
- Meisner technique requires the actor to focus totally on the other actor as though they are real and they only exist in that moment. This is a method that makes the actors in the scene seem more authentic to the audience. It is based on the principle that acting finds its expression in people's response to other people and circumstances. It is based on Stanislavski's system.
- The Stella Adler technique is founded on an actor's ability to imagine a character's world. Adler believed that over-reliance on personal, emotional memories limited an actor's range. Her technique encourages actors to expand their understanding of the world, in order to create compelling performances. Adler taught her actors to deliberately observe the textures, aesthetics, and sounds of everyday life, enabling them to conjure detailed and realistic mental images on stage. Adler also stressed on the actor's "size" by encouraging actors to fully commit to their performances and adding some sort of intensity to their roles.
- Practical Aesthetics is an acting technique originally conceived by David Mamet and William H. Macy, based on the teachings of Stanislavski, Sanford Meisner, and the Stoic philosopher Epictetus. Some key features of the method include a particular method of script analysis, adaptability, and repetition exercises similar to those in Meisner technique.
- In the Brechtian Method, Bertolt Brecht developed an "epic drama" style that relies on the audience's reflective detachment rather than emotional involvement.
- Ion Cojar founded a unique method that revolutionised the Romanian school of acting.
- Uta Hagen - See Respect for Acting
- Viola Spolin - See also Theatre games
- The Ivana Chubbuck technique features 12 steps of script analysis, and using emotion not as an end goal but as a means of attaining a character's objective.
