= Classical acting =

Traditional type of acting

Classical acting is a traditional type of acting which is centered around the external behavior of the performer. Classical acting differs from newer styles of acting, as it is developed around the ideas of the actor themselves which includes their expression of the body, voice, imagination, personalizing, improvisation, external stimuli, and script analysis. This further places emphasis on an actor's psychological relationship with their part as they 'live' their role in order to create realism.

The origin of classical acting stems from techniques developed on the European stage between the 5th and 16th centuries.

== Education ==
Classical acting today is available for study in universities, drama conservatories, and acting studios across the world. Schools that are attached to or affiliated with a professional classical theatre company give students exposure and opportunity beyond simply the education. Examples of schools or studios with classical acting programs include:

- University of London's Drama Conservatoire: Draws on theories of Michel Saint-Denis with training of the body, voice, and imagination. There is an emphasis on re-interpretation and re-imagining, with equal parts of art and craft in the education. Classical texts of Greek tragedy and Shakespeare are utilized, as well as modern plays.
- CNSAD France's national drama academy located in Paris.
- The Juilliard School Drama Division in New York: There is both vocal and physical training, with script and word analysis, style work, and risk taking with imagination.
- Montreal's National Theatre School of Canada: Learns the craft and art of acting through the contemporary theatre, applying techniques of voice, singing, and movement. The School ascribes to the philosophies of Michel Saint-Denis, which includes exploration, writing, studio presentations, imagination, improvisation, "the mask", and audition preparation.
- The Berg Studios in Los Angeles: Explores classical acting technique and imagination, including developing of a repeatable acting system, script analysis, physical movement, self-discovery through imagination, and illuminating the dialogue through subtext.
- Yale School of Drama in New Haven, Connecticut: Actors are given extensive production work opportunities, working with director, dramaturgs, and playwrights to create theatre pieces and learn from the collaborative process. Using the body as a source of inspiration and expression of work is a focus of the first year training.
- The Bristol Old Vic Theatre School in Bristol, United Kingdom
- Italia Conti Academy of Theatre Arts: Offers training in classical acting, including Shakespeare

== Classically trained actors ==
Many world-renowned actors and actresses are students of Classical Acting, including Laurence Olivier, Vivien Leigh, Dame Maggie Smith and Ralph Fiennes and Oscar winners Eddie Redmayne and Cate Blanchett.

Some well-known classically trained actors include:

- Peggy Ashcroft
- Richard Attenborough
- Hayley Atwell
- Ethel Barrymore
- John Barrymore
- Lionel Barrymore
- Angela Bassett
- Alan Bates
- Cate Blanchett
- Dirk Bogarde
- Kenneth Branagh
- Ben Browder
- Richard Burton
- James Cagney
- Gwendoline Christie
- Frances Conroy
- Tom Courtenay
- Brian Cox
- Benedict Cumberbatch
- Timothy Dalton
- Bette Davis
- Viola Davis
- Judi Dench
- Robert Donat
- James Drury
- John Dunsworth
- Chiwetel Ejiofor
- Edith Evans
- Joseph Fiennes
- Ralph Fiennes
- Albert Finney
- Kate Fleetwood
- John Gielgud
- Alec Guinness
- Richard Harris
- Rex Harrison
- Katharine Hepburn
- Tom Hiddleston
- Ian Holm
- Anthony Hopkins
- John Hurt
- Jeremy Irons
- Derek Jacobi
- Felicity Jones
- James Earl Jones
- Dame Celia Johnson
- Boris Karloff
- Ben Kingsley
- Elsa Lanchester
- Angela Lansbury
- Charles Laughton
- Vivien Leigh
- John Lithgow
- Richard Madden
- James Mason
- James McAvoy
- Audra McDonald
- Ian McKellen
- Helen Mirren
- Eve Myles
- Lupita Nyong'o
- Laurence Olivier
- David Oyelowo
- Christopher Plummer
- Pete Postlethwaite
- Sreejith Ramanan
- Basil Rathbone
- Corin Redgrave
- Lynn Redgrave
- Michael Redgrave
- Vanessa Redgrave
- Eddie Redmayne
- Ralph Richardson
- Alan Rickman
- Geoffrey Rush
- Margaret Rutherford
- Mark Rylance
- Alastair Sim
- Paul Scofield
- William Shatner
- Dame Maggie Smith
- Donald Sutherland
- Timothy Spall
- Patrick Stewart
- David Tennant
- Emma Thompson
- Sybil Thorndike
- Luke Treadaway
- Peter O'Toole
- Polly Walker
- David Warner
- Orson Welles
- May Whitty

== See also ==
- List of acting techniques
- Stanislavski's system
- Method acting
- Konstantin Stanislavski
- Lee Strasberg
- Sanford Meisner
- Ion Cojar
- Ivana Chubbuck
