= Presentational and representational acting =

Styles of acting

Presentational acting and the related representational acting are opposing ways of sustaining the actor–audience relationship. With presentational acting, the actor acknowledges the audience. With representational acting, the audience is studiously ignored and treated as voyeurs.

In terms of the actor-character relationship, the type of theatre that uses 'presentational acting' in the actor-audience sense is often associated with a performer using 'representational acting' as their actor-character methodology. Conversely, the type of theatre that uses 'representational acting' in the actor-audience sense is often associated with a performer using a 'presentational acting' methodology.

== The actor–audience relationship ==
In every theatrical performance the manner in which each individual actor treats the audience establishes, sustains or varies a particular kind of actor-audience relationship between them.

In some plays all of the actors may adopt the same attitude towards the audience (for example, the entire cast of a production of a Chekhovian drama will usually ignore the audience until the curtain call); in other plays the performers create a range of different relationships towards the audience (for example, most Shakespearean dramas have certain characters who frequently adopt a downstage 'platea' playing position that is in direct contact with the audience, while other characters behave as if unaware of the audience's presence).

=== Presentational acting ===
Conventionalized presentational devices include the apologetic prologue and epilogue, the induction (much used by Ben Jonson and by Shakespeare in The Taming of the Shrew), the play-within-the-play, the aside directed to the audience, and other modes of direct address. These premeditated and 'composed' forms of actor-audience persuasion are in effect metadramatic and metatheatrical functions, since they bring attention to bear on the fictional status of the characters, on the very theatrical transaction (in soliciting the audience's indulgence, for instance), and so on. They appear to be cases of 'breaking frame', since the actor is required to step out of his role and acknowledge the presence of the public, but in practice they are licensed means of confirming the frame by pointing out the pure facticity of the representation.

Keir Elam, The Semiotics of Theatre and Drama, p. 90

'Presentational acting', in this sense, refers to a relationship that acknowledges the audience, whether directly by addressing them, or indirectly through a general attitude or specific use of language, looks, gestures or other signs that indicate that the character or actor is aware of the audience's presence. (Shakespeare's use of punning and wordplay, for example, often has this function of indirect contact.)

=== Representational acting ===
'Representational acting', in this sense, refers to a relationship in which the audience is studiously ignored and treated as 'peeping tom' voyeurs by an actor who remains in-character and absorbed in the dramatic action. The actor behaves as if a fourth wall were present, which maintains an absolute autonomy of the dramatic fiction from the reality of the theatre.

Robert Weimann argues that:

Each of these theatrical practices draws upon a different register of imaginary appeal and "puissance" and each serves a different purpose of playing. While the former derives its primary strength from the immediacy of the physical act of histrionic delivery, the latter is vitally connected with the imaginary product and effect of rendering absent meanings, ideas, and images of artificial persons' thoughts and actions. But the distinction is more than epistemological and not simply a matter of poetics; rather it relates to the issue of function.

== The actor–character relationship ==
The use of these critical terms (in an almost directly opposed sense from the critical mainstream usage detailed above) to describe two different forms of the actor–character relationship within an actor's methodology originates from the American actor and teacher Uta Hagen. She developed this use from a far more ambiguous formulation offered by the Russian theatre practitioner Konstantin Stanislavski in chapter two of his acting manual An Actor's Work (1938).

=== Stanislavski's typology ===
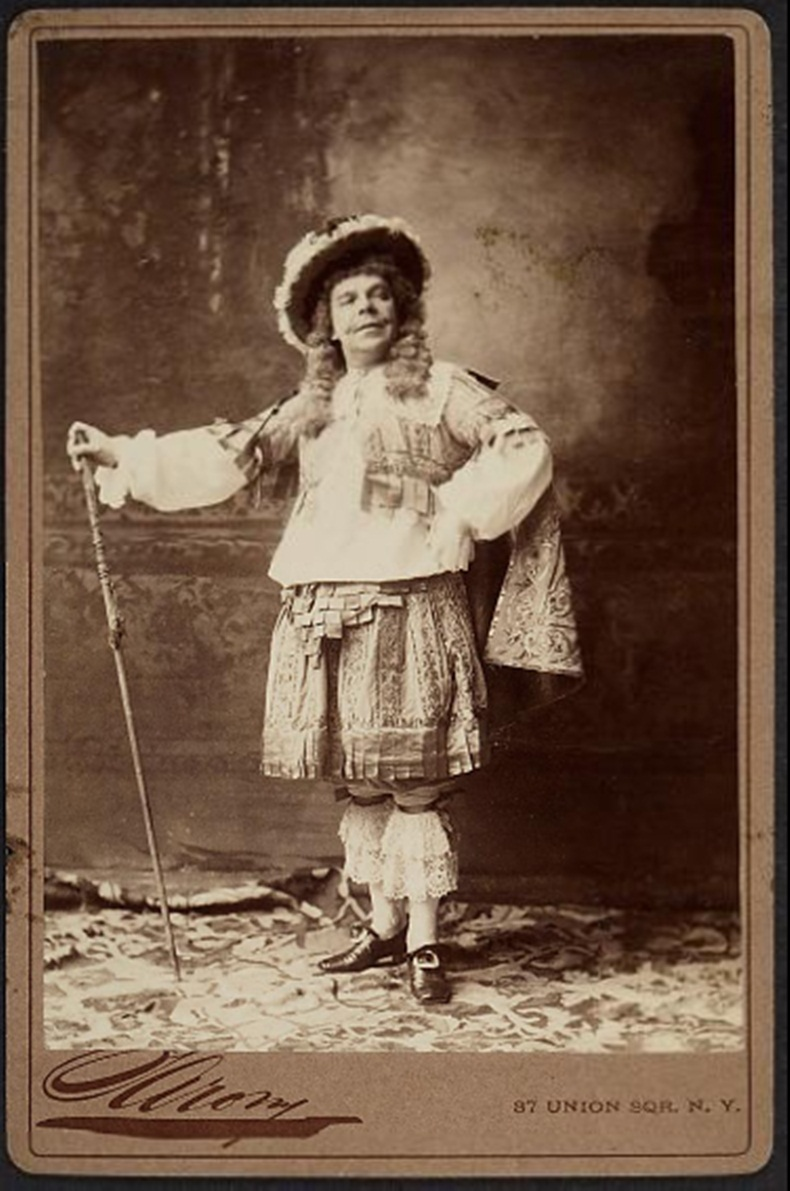
Stanislavski considered the French actor Coquelin (1841-1909) to be one of the best examples of "an artist of the school of representation".

In "When Acting is an Art", having watched his students' first attempts at a performance, Stanislavski's fictional persona Tortsov offers a series of critiques, during the course of which he defines different forms and approaches to acting. They are: 'forced acting', 'overacting', 'the exploitation of art', 'mechanical acting', 'art of representation', and his own 'experiencing the role'. One common misrepresentation of Stanislavski is the frequent confusion of the first five of these categories with one another; Stanislavski, however, goes to some lengths to insist that 'two of them deserve to be evaluated as 'art': his own approach of 'experiencing the role' and that of the 'art of representation'. He also makes the concession that so called "mechanical" acting can appear, when done well enough, to be almost the same as representation in the eyes of the audience, and is therefore occasionally artistic in quality.

The distinction between Stanislavski's 'experiencing the role' and 'representing the part' (which Stanislavski identifies with the French actor Coquelin) turns on the relationship that the actor establishes with their character during the performance. In Stanislavski's approach, by the time the actor reaches the stage, he or she no longer experiences a distinction between his or her self and the character; the actor has created a 'third being', or a combination of the actor's personality and the role (in Russian, Stanislavski calls this creation artisto-rol). In the art of representation approach, whilst on-stage the actor experiences the distinction between the two (the philosopher and dramatist Diderot calls this psychological duality the actor's 'paradox'). Both approaches use 'living the role' or identifying with the character during rehearsals; Stanislavski's approach undertakes this process at all times onstage, while the 'art of representation' incorporates the results of the rehearsal process in a "finished" form.

== Confusion of terms ==
Because the same terms have been applied to certain approaches to acting in ways that contradict the broader theatrical definitions, the terms have acquired often overtly contradictory senses. In the most common sense (that which relates the specific dynamics of theatre to the broader aesthetic category of 'representational art' or 'mimesis' in drama and literature), the terms describe two contrasting functional relationships between the actor and the audience that a performance can create.

In the other (more specialized) sense, the terms describe two contrasting methodological relationships between the actor and his or her character in performance.

The collision of these two senses can cause confusion. The type of theatre that uses 'presentational acting' in the first sense (of the actor-audience relationship) is often associated with a performer using 'representational acting' in the second sense (of their methodology). Conversely, the type of theatre that uses 'representational acting' in the first sense is often associated with a performer using 'presentational acting' in the second sense. Although common, these chiastic correspondences do not apply in all cases of theatrical performance.

Stanislavski's choice of the phrase 'art of representation' to describe an artistic approach that diverges from his own has led to some confusion, given that the theatre that is often associated with his own 'experiencing the role' approach (realistic, not acknowledging the audience) is 'representational' in the wider critical sense. Uta Hagen's decision to use 'presentational' as a synonym for Stanislavski's 'experiencing the role' served to compound the confusion, which was part of the reason she preferred to refer to them instead as "formalistic acting" and "realistic acting".

=== Presentational versus representational acting ===
In their textbooks for actors, both Stanislavski and Hagen adhere to a mode of theatrical performance that starts with the subjective experience of the actor, who takes action under the circumstances of the character, and trusts that a form will follow. They deem it more useful for the actor to focus exclusively on the fictional, subjective reality of the character (via the actor's "emotional memory" or "transferences" from his own life), without concerning himself with the external realities of the theatre. Both teachers were fully aware of the 'outside' to the dramatic fiction, but they believed that from the actor's perspective these considerations do not help the performance, and only lead to false, mechanical acting.

Uta Hagen exemplifies the techniques :

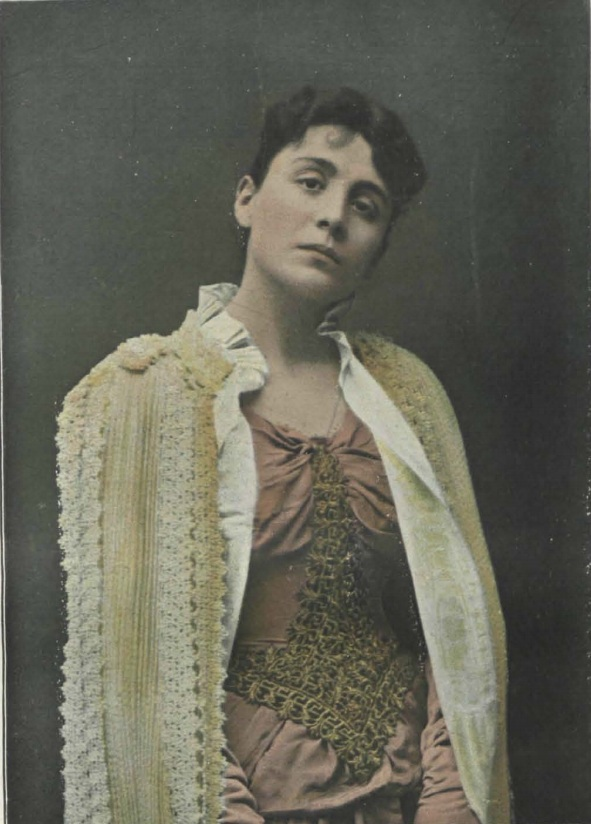
Eleonora Duse

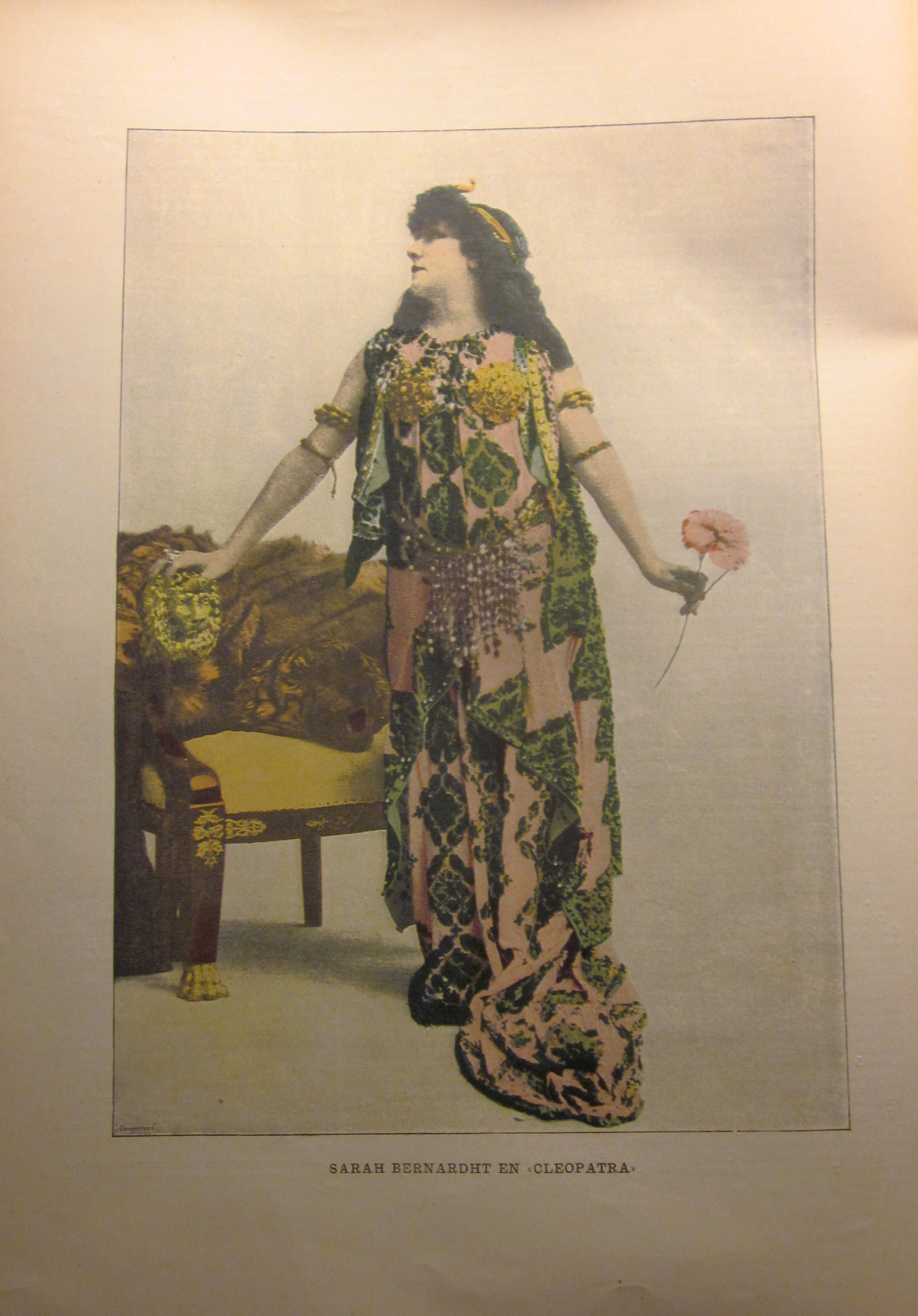
Sarah Bernhardt

For an example of the above, let me again refer to Sarah Bernhardt and Eleonora Duse. Each, in her native tongue, had played the same popular melodrama of the time, the high point of which was the moment when the wife, accused of infidelity by her husband, swore her virtue. "Je jure, je jure, JE JUUUUURE!" Berhardt proclaimed in a rising vibrato of passion. Her audience stood to scream and shout its admiration. Duse swore her virtue softly and only twice. She never spoke the third oath, but placed her hand on her young son's head as she looked directly at her husband. Duse's audience wept."

Many types of drama in the history of theatre do make use of the presentational 'outside' and its many possible interactions with the representational 'inside', including Shakespeare, Restoration comedy, and Brecht. However, both Stanislavski and Hagen applied their processes of acting to these types of drama as well, aware of their particular requirements with regard to the audience. Hagen stated that style is a label given to the "final product" by critics, scholars, and audience members, and that the "creator" (actor) need only explore the subjective content of the playwright's world. She saw definitions of "style" as something applied by others to the result, having nothing to do with the actor's process.

Shakespearean drama assumed a natural, direct and often renewed contact with the audience on the part of the performer. 'Fourth wall' performances foreclose the complex layerings of theatrical and dramatic realities that result from this contact and that are built into Shakespeare's dramaturgy. An example is the line spoken by Cleopatra in act five of Antony and Cleopatra (1607), when she contemplates her humiliation in Rome at the hands of Octavius Caesar; she imagines mocking theatrical renditions of her own story: "And I shall see some squeaking Cleopatra boy my greatness in the posture of a whore" (5.2.215-217). That this was to be spoken by a boy in a dress in a theatre is an integral part of its dramatic meaning. Opponents of the Stanislavski/Hagen approach have argued that this complexity is unavailable to a purely 'naturalistic' treatment that recognizes no distinction between actor and character nor acknowledges the presence of the actual audience. They also argue that it is not only a matter of the interpretation of individual moments; the presentational dimension is a structural part of the meaning of the drama as a whole. This structural dimension is most visible in Restoration comedy through its persistent use of the aside, though there are many other meta-theatrical aspects in operation in these plays.

In Brecht, the interaction between the two dimensions—representational and presentational—forms a major part of his 'epic' dramaturgy and receives theoretical elaboration through his conception of the relation between mimesis and Gestus. How to play Brecht with regard to presentational versus representational acting has been a controversial subject of much critical and practical discussion. Hagen's opinion (supported by conversations with Brecht himself and the actress who was directed by him in the original production of Mother Courage) was that, for the actor, Brecht always intended it to be about the character's subjective reality, including the direct audience addresses. In her view, the structure of the play was enough to accomplish his desired "alienation".

== See also ==
=== Related terms and concepts ===
- Defamiliarization effect
- Dramatic convention
- Figurative art
- Viewpoints
- Meta-reference and metatheatre
- Mimesis and diegisis
- The fourth wall

=== Related practitioners and dramatic genres ===
==== Representational actor–audience relations ====
- Konstantin Stanislavski
- Stanislavski's 'system'
- Method acting
- Meisner technique
- André Antoine
- Otto Brahm
- J. T. Grein
- Naturalism
- Psychological realism

==== Presentational actor–audience relations ====
- Bertolt Brecht
- Epic theater
- Vsevolod Meyerhold
- Erwin Piscator
- Joan Littlewood and theatre workshop
- Augusto Boal and Theatre of the Oppressed
- Dario Fo and Franca Rame
- Elizabethan Theatre
- Restoration comedy

== Works cited ==
- Counsell, Colin. 1996. Signs of Performance: An Introduction to Twentieth-Century Theatre. London and New York: Routledge. ISBN 0-415-10643-5.
- Elam, Keir. 1980. The Semiotics of Theatre and Drama. New Accents Ser. London and New York: Methuen. ISBN 0-416-72060-9.
- Hagen, Uta. 1973. Respect for Acting. New York: Macmillan. ISBN 0-02-547390-5.
- Hagen, Uta 1991. A Challenge for the Actor. New York: Scribner's. ISBN 0-684-19040-0
- Roach, Joseph R. 1985. The Player's Passion: Studies in the Science of Acting. Theater:Theory/Text/Performance Ser. Ann Arbor: University of Michigan Press. ISBN 0-472-08244-2.
- Stanislavski, Constantin. 1936. An Actor Prepares. London: Methuen, 1988. ISBN 0-413-46190-4.
- Weimann, Robert. 1978. Shakespeare and the Popular Tradition in the Theater: Studies in the Social Dimension of Dramatic Form and Function. Baltimore and London: The Johns Hopkins University Press. ISBN 0-8018-3506-2.
- ---. 2000. Author's Pen and Actor's Voice: Playing and Writing in Shakespeare's Theatre. Ed. Helen Higbee and William West. Cambridge Studies in Renaissance Literature and Culture. Cambridge: Cambridge University Press. ISBN 0-521-78735-1.
