= Paradox of the Actor =

18th-century French essay by Denis Diderot

Paradox of the Actor (French: Paradoxe sur le comédien) is a dramatic essay by French writer Denis Diderot. It was written between 1770 and 1778 but first published after the death of the author in 1830. The work elucidates a theory of acting in which it is argued that great actors do not experience the emotions they are displaying.

His theory was further developed by Russian theatre practitioner Konstantin Stanislavski as the art of representation. It contradicts the view of Horace with regard to the use of emotion in rhetoric: Si vis me flere, primium tibi flendum est ('If you wish me to weep you must first weep yourself'), itself further developed as Stanislavski's system and method acting.

== Content ==
The essay consists of a dialogue between two speakers in which the first speaker espouses the views of Diderot on acting. The first speaker argues that the great actor is characterized by a complete absence of any feeling; and that the art of the great actor consists of displaying the illusion of feeling. The reason is that if the great actor were to become emotional he would not be able to play the same part in the theater in repeat performances with the same success. Also, those actors who depend on feeling when performing usually give unpredictable or uneven performances. The great actor is thus guided by his intelligence, and not by his emotion. Once the great actor has studied and conceptualized his part through intelligence, he will be able to give repeat performances successfully irrespective of what is going on in his personal life.

Occasionally, the character being played, as conceptualized by the great actor, transcends the character conceptualized by the author. Diderot gives the example of Mlle. Clairon, who once played a character in a play authored by Voltaire; Voltaire, who was in the audience, had cried out "Did I write that?" on seeing her magnificent performance. Diderot accepts that a great actor like Mlle. Clairon could experience emotion when portraying the character for the first time; but in repeat performances she would be in complete control of her emotions. Diderot also gives an example of the great actor's theatrical discipline:

I myself saw what I am going to tell you. Garrick stuck his head out of a door, and, within four or five seconds his face changed from delirious joy to moderate cheerfulness, from this cheerfulness to serenity, from serenity to surprise, from surprise to astonishment, from astonishment to sadness, from sadness to dejection, from dejection to fear, from fear to horror, from horror to despondency, and from this last emotion back up the ladder to the first.

The essay is also of note for being where the term l'esprit de l'escalier (or l'esprit d'escalier) (UK: /lɛˌspriː d(ə l)ɛˈskæljeɪ/, US: /lɛˌspriː d(ə ˌl)ɛskəˈljeɪ/, French: [lɛspʁi d(ə l)ɛskalje]; lit. 'the staircase mind') comes from. It is a French term used in English for the predicament of thinking of the perfect reply too late. As noted in the essay, during a dinner at the home of statesman Jacques Necker, a remark was made to Diderot which left him speechless at the time, because, he explains, "a sensitive man, such as myself, overwhelmed by the argument levelled against him, becomes confused and [can only think clearly again when he] finds himself at the bottom of the stairs" (l'homme sensible, comme moi, tout entier à ce qu'on lui objecte, perd la tête et ne se retrouve qu'au bas de l'escalier).

In this case, "the bottom of the stairs" refers to the architecture of the kind of hôtel particulier or mansion to which Diderot had been invited. In such houses, the reception rooms were on the étage noble, one floor above the ground floor. To have reached the bottom of the stairs means to have definitively left the gathering.

== Critical reception ==
=== Binet's counter-thesis (1896) ===
Diderot's thesis was systematically challenged by the psychologist Alfred Binet in an article published in L'Année psychologique in 1896. Drawing on surveys conducted with actors of his time, Binet rehabilitates emotional sensitivity against Diderot's doctrine of insensibility. The philosopher Martine Chifflot, who analyses this controversy in detail, highlights that the testimonies gathered by Binet reveal lived experiences too varied and complex to be reduced to the thesis of cold-blooded control.

Among the actors interviewed by Binet, Paul Mounet attests that the days when emotion is absent, one does not reach the desired power, and one plays merely with one's talent — that is to say, with one's reasoning and one's craft. Madame Bartet, by contrast, defends an intermediate position: she acknowledges emotion as real and genuinely felt, but asserts that she remains its master, able to summon or extinguish it at will, which paradoxically brings her close to Diderot's thesis while also nuancing it. Mounet-Sully, for his part, describes not the copying of a model but a voluntary haunting by the character: one evokes, constructs, and lets oneself be haunted by him, surrendering body and soul.

These testimonies reveal that the debate is less between sensitivity and insensibility than between two regimes of control: that of an emotion one commands, and that of an emotion which inhabits one without overwhelming one.

=== Diderot's two metaphors ===
Chifflot also analyses the internal tension between the two metaphors Diderot himself uses to describe the actor's work: the phantom (an inner model that haunts the actor) and the wicker mannequin (an outer structure the actor inhabits). These two images imply almost contrary operations — haunting on the one hand, inhabitation on the other — and it is precisely this unresolved tension that accounts for the complexity of the interpretive act that the Paradox seeks to theorise.

=== Legacy: Brecht and Artaud ===
The Paradox has durably shaped thinking on the art of acting. Bertolt Brecht, a declared admirer of Diderot, redeployed most of his theses within a historical materialist framework: he advocated for Verfremdungseffekt (the alienation effect), which forbids the actor from complete transformation into the character. He nonetheless concedes identification as a legitimate psychological act — but only in rehearsal, never in performance.

Antonin Artaud represents the opposing response: rejecting any reduction of performance to mechanics or critical distance, he posits in the actor an "athlete of the heart," capable of mobilising an "affective musculature" that acts directly upon the spectator's body. This conception, inspired by Balinese theatre, reconnects with a psychophysical efficacy that Indian aesthetic traditions (the rasa) had theorised, yet which Western theatre had failed to assimilate into its own heritage.

== Appreciation ==
Lee Strasberg commented that Diderot's analysis in Paradox of the Actor "has remained to this day the most significant attempt to deal with the problem of acting."

In the early 20th century, the influential stage director Theodore Komisarjevsky was quoted as criticizing Diderot's view that a good actor should "watch himself" during the performance, as his experience suggested that this led to an unhelpful self-consciousness. He agreed that an actor should not directly experience the emotions being portrayed, but recommended that they imaginatively engage with the creative setting, rather than intellectually focus on their own performance.
