= Building a Character =

Book by Konstantin Stanislavski

- First English-language edition
- Author: Konstantin Stanislavski
- Original title: Работа актера над собой
- Translator: Elizabeth Reynolds Hapgood
- Language: Russian
- Subject: Acting
- Published: 1948; 1949 (Theatre Art Books)
- Publication place: Soviet Union
- Media type: Print
- Preceded by: An Actor Prepares
- Followed by: Creating a Role

Building a Character (Russian: Работа актера над собой) is the second of stage actor/director Konstantin Stanislavski's three books on his method for learning the art of acting. It was first published in Russian in 1948; Elizabeth Reynolds Hapgood's seminal English translation was published by Theatre Art Books of New York the following year.

In Stanislavski's most widely read work, An Actor Prepares, he describes a process by which an actor imagines the character he will become. In Building a Character, he explains that the outward expressions of character must flow from that character's inner life: his memories, beliefs, preoccupations, and so on. He then elaborates ways in which the actor's manner of speech, dress, and movement (gestures, facial expressions, etc.) evidence the character's inner experience.

Creating a Role, the final book in the trilogy, followed Building a Character in 1957.

== Contents ==
1. Toward a Physical Characterization
2. Dressing a Character
3. Characters and Types
4. Making the Body Expressive
5. Plasticity of Motion
6. Restraint and Control
7. Diction and Singing
8. Intonations and Pauses
9. Accentuation: The Expressive Word
10. Perspective in Character Building
11. Tempo-Rhythm in Movement
12. Speech Tempo-Rhythm
13. Stage Charm
14. Toward an Ethics for the Theatre
15. Patterns of Accomplishment
16. Some Conclusions on Acting

=== Overview ===
Building a Character is the third volume in a set of three volumes that Stanislavski wrote which crafted a method for actors to develop techniques, acting, and characters for the acting craft. The first volume, My Life in the Art outlines Stanislavski's experience acting in the Moscow Art Theater. The second volume, An Actor Prepares, explores how actors prepare and the internalized processes that actors undergo when preparing for the stage.

Following volume two is Building a Character. This volume examines the externalized body and mechanisms external to the body. Building a character in this work includes the inflection, diction, and tone of the voice. It also includes the gait and movement of the body, as well as the body's interaction with props and other bodies. This volume also extends to the usage and wearing of costumes, including how the actor wears them and uses them to enrich the character portrayed on stage.

Stanislavki's theory transformed ways of acting so much that his method, which is similar to control theory, is now just referred to as "method" or "the method."

== Reception ==
Critics tend to agree that Stanislavski's volumes are some of the most comprehensive and helpful books for actors trying to build their craft and stage characters. The series, especially Building a Character, focuses more on craft rather than literature and drama. Prior to the publication of Building a Character, there was a lack of reference works for actors in building a character for the stage through acting mechanics.

The book is historically influenced by Russian culture and theater, as well as European theater prior to World War I.

== See also ==
- Stanislavski's system
- Method acting
