= My Life in Art =

1924 autobiography by Konstantin Stanislavski

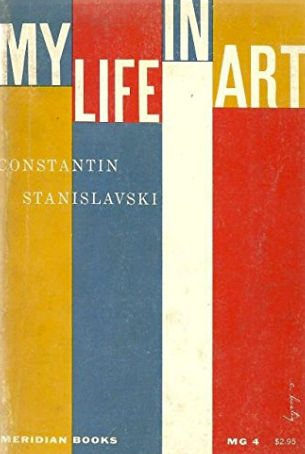
- Author: Konstantin Stanislavski
- Original title: Моя жизнь в искусстве
- Translator: J. J. Robbins (1924); Jean Benedetti (2008)
- Language: Russian
- Subject: Autobiography
- Publisher: Little, Brown and Company
- Publication place: United States
- English publication date: 1924
- Media type: Print
- OCLC: 614933
- LC Class: PN2728.S78 A32 1924
- Followed by: An Actor Prepares

My Life in Art is the autobiography of the Russian actor and theatre director Konstantin Stanislavski. It was first commissioned while Stanislavski was in the United States on tour with the Moscow Art Theatre, and was first published in Boston in English in 1924. It was later revised and published in a Russian-language edition in Moscow under the title Моя жизнь в искусстве. It is divided into 4 sections entitled: 1-Artistic Childhood, 2-Artistic Youth, 3-Artistic Adolescence and 4-Artistic Adulthood.

== Contents ==
Stanislavski divides the work into four sections representing different stages of his life: childhood, adolescence, youth, and adulthood.

=== Artistic Childhood ===
This section, comprising 11 chapters, begins with Stanislavski's birth in 1863 and ends in his early twenties. He first describes his family life and upbringing, discussing his early trips to the circus, the Italian opera, the ballet and his introduction to the Russian theatre. He describes the professional Puppet Show, which he and his siblings put on at home, as well as other events that shaped him early on as an artist. He describes his first experience acting, his experience as a director of the Moscow Musical Society and his brief and unsatisfying experience in the Maly Theatre drama school, from which he dropped out within three weeks.

=== Artistic Adolescence ===
In this brief three-chapter section, Stanislavski describes his fleeting endeavors with an amateur theatrical group called The Alekseyev Circle (Alekseyev was Stanislavski's real last name) put together by him and his siblings in the summer of 1884. Their goal was to put on operettas which were very popular at the time in Moscow. These endeavors lead him on to the beginning of his acting career. In this section he also talks about his obsession with ballet and his ambitions to become an opera singer, which were both short-lived.

=== Artistic Youth ===
"Artistic Youth", the largest section, comprises 41 chapters. It begins with the foundation of the Moscow Society of Art and Literature in the winter of 1888, which he founded at the age of 25 along with Russian director Aleksandr Fedotov and the group of actors Fedotov had put together, which included Stanislavski. Fedotov had directed Stanislavski in a play by Nikolai Gogol, called "The Players". Stanislavski considered Fedotov the first "truly talented director" he had ever worked with. In the first half of this section Stanislavski describes many of the plays put on by the group, beginning with their debut and ending with the events that led to the foundation of the Moscow Art Theatre on October 14, 1897. He discusses his breakthroughs in the art of acting that he achieved in those ten years, through his experience as an actor and a director. He also tells about his acquaintance and relationship with Leo Tolstoy. One of the events that led to the founding of the Moscow Art Theatre was Stanislavski's acquaintance with the theatre's co-director and co-founder Vladimir Nemirovich-Danchenko, who at the time was a well-known Russian playwright and director of the drama school of the Moscow Philharmonic Society. Among the school's graduates in the class of 1898 were Olga Knipper and Vsevolod Meyerhold. At the Moscow Art Theatre Stanislavski was in charge of the directing side of all productions and Nemirovich-Danchenko was in charge of the literary side. At least they agreed that each of them would have the power of veto in their area of expertise, whenever an agreement could not be made on a particular subject.

The second half of section three describes the first nine years of the Moscow Art Theatre's existence up until their first international tour in 1906, when they traveled to Berlin. Stanislavski spends most of this section describing in dramatic detail his relationship with Anton Chekhov and the productions of Chekhov's plays, beginning with their first production of "The Seagull", which had been originally staged in St. Petersburg, and ending with their production of "The Cherry Orchard" in 1904 and Chekhov's death that same year. He describes what it was like staging these plays with the aid of Chekhov himself, often through correspondence due to his tuberculosis which forced him to spend the winters in the Crimea. He discusses his breakthroughs in the art of acting that were found through working on these plays, which laid the foundations for "realism" in the theatre. Stanislavski felt that the reason why other contemporary theatre groups had no success with Chekhov's plays is because they were trying to perform them using the old school of acting, which consisted grand gestures and loud declamations that overpowered the simplicity in Chekhov's works. Stanislavski discovered that Chekhov's plays were most effective when the actors utilized stillness and silence on stage.

=== Artistic Adulthood ===
In this section, comprising 18 chapters, Stanislavski describes the beginnings of his work on formulating a "system" of teaching acting, which eventually led him to write his famous books on acting, which in English are called "An Actor Prepares", "Building a Character" and "Creating a Role". These books make up volumes 2, 3 and 4 of Stanislavski's Complete Works, which is an 8-volume set, published in Russia in 1954. "My Life in Art" is, of course, the first volume. Stanislavski's "system" was built on a compilation of material he had gathered over the course of two decades of work in the theatre, and was in a great effort to find the answers his many unanswered questions about the nature of acting as an art form. Work on this system, according to Stanislavski, started during the 1906/07 season of the Moscow Art Theatre. He began by experimenting on himself and other actors during rehearsals for plays and ended up using the actual productions for his experiments in using new techniques, such as relaxation and concentration on stage. It was in this period that he developed his principles of the "magic if" (when actors asks themselves the question, "If I, as the character, were in a particular situation, what would I do?) and "a sense of truth" (a sense that actors must develop that allows them sense whether or not their words and actions are believable). But Stanislavski eventually came to the conclusion that the theatre was not the place for such experiments, as it distracted from much of the work that needed to be done. This conclusion led him to open up the first Studio of the Moscow Art Theatre, which still exists today. The section also describes some of the Moscow Art Theatre's productions of various plays, including Ivan Turgenev's "A Month in the Country". He also talks about the Russian Revolution of 1917 and its effects on the Theatre. He ends the book with a chapter entitled "Conclusions and the Future", in which he discusses several of his conclusions about the art of acting and his "system", which as he states, consists of two parts: 1-an actor's internal and external work on himself ("An Actor Prepares"), 2- an actor's internal and external work on a role ("Building a Character" and "Creating a Role"). He ends by stating that he will divulge on this in his next book, which he does in the three volumes. Having written those three volumes, he continued to reinvent his "system" and reformulate many of his opinions on acting. It seems as though he never found the answers to all of his questions. But he certainly got closer than most people before him and after. He laid the foundation for many of those who came after him, namely teachers like Stella Adler, Lee Strasberg, and Sanford Meisner, who passed on his legacy to the next generation of stage and film actors.
