= Comic timing =

Use of timing to enhance a comedic purpose

A comically timed scene from Buster Keaton's 1920 film One Week

Comic timing or comedic timing is a performer's joke delivery as they interact with an audience using intonation, rhythm, cadence, tempo, and beat to guide the comedic narrative. The pacing of the delivery of a joke can have an impact on its effect or change its meaning. This can also be true in physical comedy.

== History ==
The use of comic timing can be seen in the plays of the ancient Greeks. Aristophanes indicated brief pauses in his works in order to cause laughter. William Shakespeare also used comic timing in plays. Cleopatra's interjections during Mark Antony's speech in Act 1 Scene 2 of Antony and Cleopatra, shift a serious scene to a comic one. George Bernard Shaw continued the use of comic timing. In his 1894 play Arms and the Man, Shaw uses it near the end of Act 2 through Nicola's losses of composure.

While the use of comic timing became more used on stage, by the mid-20th century, comic timing became used for comedy film, television and stand-up comedy. In movies, comedians such as Charlie Chaplin, Laurel and Hardy and Buster Keaton used it in their comedic performances through timing in films like One A.M., The Lucky Dog, and The Playhouse respectively. In television, Lucille Ball used comic timing in her show I Love Lucy. For example, in the episode "Lucy Does a TV Commercial" Ball acts out an advertisement within a fake television set, but ruins the illusion by a timed break of the TV's fourth wall. In stand-up, George Carlin's routine "Seven Words You Can't Say on Television" uses comedic timing through the difference between the delivery of the first 6 words and the 7th. Rowan Atkinson's routine "No One Called Jones" used comic timing in his list of students' names to reveal multiple double entendres.

== Beat ==
A beat is a pause taken for the purposes of comic timing, often to allow the audience time to recognize the joke and react, or to heighten suspense before delivering the expected punch line. For example, in Jack Benny’s radio and television sketches, he often used a prolonged pause after a setup line, such as responding to a question about his age with silence and a stare, amplifying the humor through audience anticipation. Dramatic pauses can also be used to distinguish subtext from what the speaker is thinking about.

== Pregnant pause ==
A pregnant pause (as in the classical definition, "many possibilities") is a technique of comic timing used to accentuate a comedy element, which uses pauses at the end of a phrase to build up suspense. It is often used at the end of an awkward statement or in the silence after a seemingly non-comic phrase to build up a comeback. Refined by Jack Benny, who introduced specific body language and a phrase in his pregnant pauses, the pregnant pause has become popular in stand-up comedy.

== Pacing ==
Pacing, e.g. slow-paced vs. fast-paced, can affect comedic timing. In some cases, fast dialogue can create a frantic and silly atmosphere.

== See also ==
- Comedic device
- L'esprit de l'escalier
- Timing (linguistics)
