= Substitution (theatre) =

In acting, substitution is the understanding of elements in the life of one's character by comparing them to elements in one's own life. For example, if an actor is portraying a character who is being blackmailed, they could think back to some embarrassing or private fact about their own life, and mentally superimpose that onto the character's secret.

In Respect for Acting, Uta Hagen compares acting to make believe, saying, "My strength as an actor rested in the unshakable faith I had in make-believe. I made myself believe the characters I was allowed to play and the circumstances of the characters' lives in the events of the play." And later in the book, "I use substitution in order to 'make believe' in its literal sense-- to make me believe [...], in order to send me into the moment-to-moment spontaneous action of my newly selected self on stage."

Hagen is clear that substitution is a means to further connect actors to their characters and the actions of the play, as opposed to, for instance, bringing on tears. "Substitution is not an end in itself, not an end to involve you for self-involvement's sake without consequent action. Let me state strongly, in case any of you have misunderstood, that substitution is the aspect of the work which strengthens your faith and your sense of reality in each stage of the total work on character. It is a way of bringing about justified, personal character actions."

Hagen also warns against confronting any traumatic experiences, believing it to be unhelpful. "There are teachers who actually force actors into dealing with something buried (their response to a death of a parent, or the trauma of a bad accident). What results is hysteria or worse, and is, in my opinion, anti-art. We are not pursuing psychotherapy. If you feel mentally sick or disturbed and in need of it, by all means go to a trained doctor or therapist, but not to an acting teacher."
