= Berg Studios =

Coordinates: 34.11589°N 118.25152°W

Berg Studios is an instructional, film and television acting studio and theatre space in Los Angeles, California. The Studio space is owned and run by acting instructor and Yale School of Drama graduate Gregory Berger-Sobeck, who has taught acting in Los Angeles since 1998.

== Instructional Approach ==
The technique and training is based on classical acting approaches of Constantin Stanislavski, with a physical acting approach and not solely from intellect. Spontaneity, honesty, and originality in working from subtext are all explored. The students are taught a repeatable system of work.

== Awards ==
Year	Award	Notes
2010	Favorite Scene Study Teacher: Gregory Berger-Sobeck	Backstage West
2010	Runner Up, Favorite Scene Study Teacher: Gregory Berger-Sobeck	Backstage West
2011	Runner Up, Favorite Private Acting Coach: Gregory Berger-Sobeck	Backstage West
2011	Runner Up, Favorite Scene Study Teacher: Gregory Berger-Sobeck	Backstage West
