= Theatre director =

Person overseeing the mounting of a theatre production

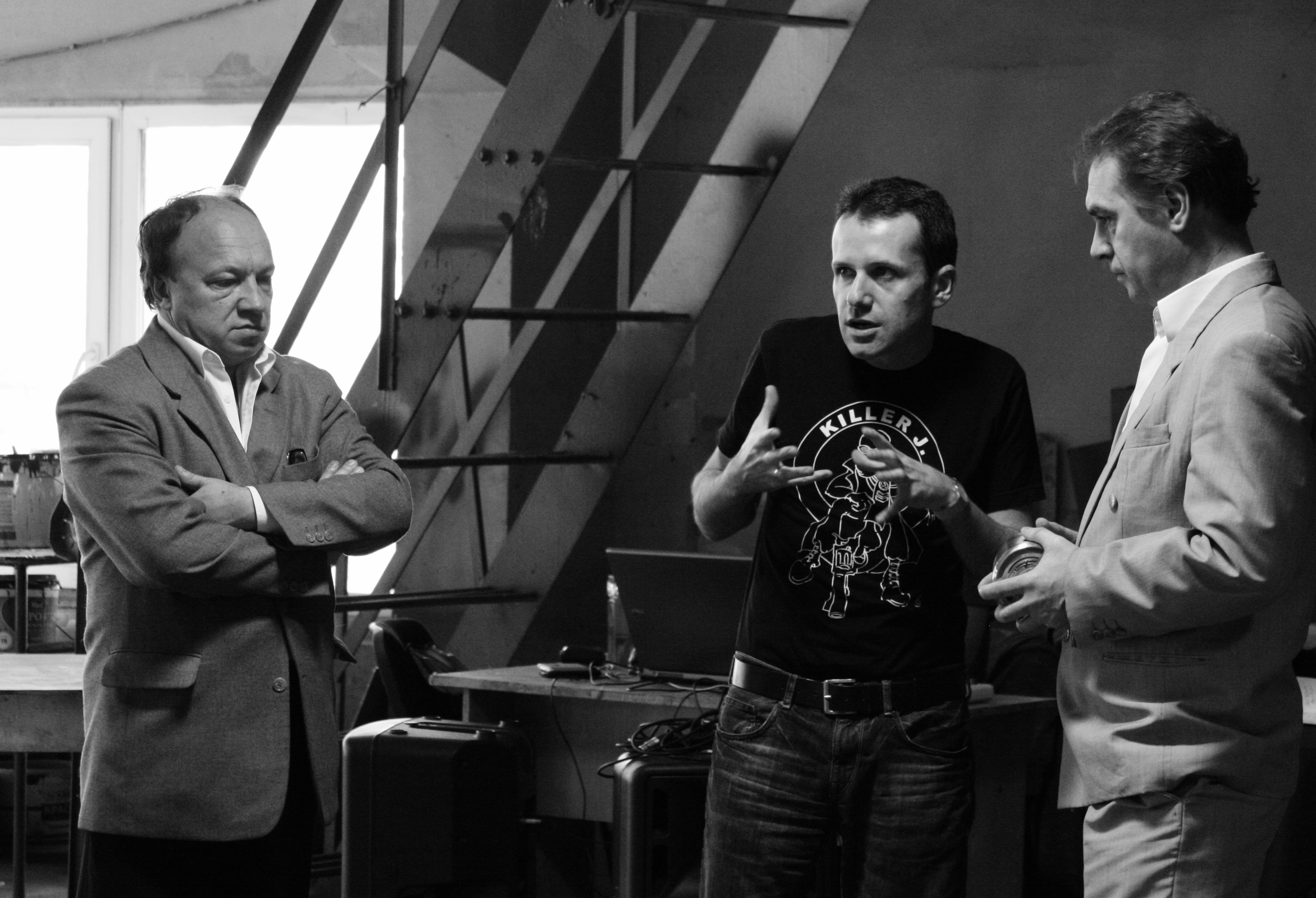
A director providing instruction

A theatre director or stage director is a professional in the theatre field who oversees and orchestrates the mounting of a theatre production such as a play, opera, dance, drama, musical theatre performance, etc. by unifying various endeavors and aspects of production. The director's function is to ensure the quality and completeness of the theatre production and to lead the members of the creative team into realizing their artistic vision for it. The director thereby collaborates with a team of creative individuals and other staff to coordinate research and work on all the aspects of the production which includes the technical and the performance aspects.

The technical aspects include: stagecraft, costume design, theatrical properties (props), lighting design, set design, and sound design for the production. The performance aspects include: acting, dance, orchestra, chants, and stage combat.

If the production is a new piece of writing or a (new) translation of a play, the director may also work with the playwright or a translator. In contemporary theatre, after the playwright, the director is generally the principle visionary, making decisions on the artistic conception and interpretation of the play and its staging. Different directors occupy different places of authority and responsibility, depending on the structure and philosophy of individual theatre companies. Directors use a wide variety of techniques, philosophies, and levels of collaboration.

== The director in theatre history ==
In ancient Greece, the birthplace of European drama, the writer bore principal responsibility for the staging of his plays. Actors were generally semi-professionals, and the director oversaw the mounting of plays from the writing process all the way through to their performance, often acting in them too, as Aeschylus for example did. The author-director would also train the chorus, sometimes compose the music, and supervise every aspect of production. The fact that the director was called didaskalos, the Greek word for "teacher," indicates that the work of these early directors combined instructing their performers with staging their work.

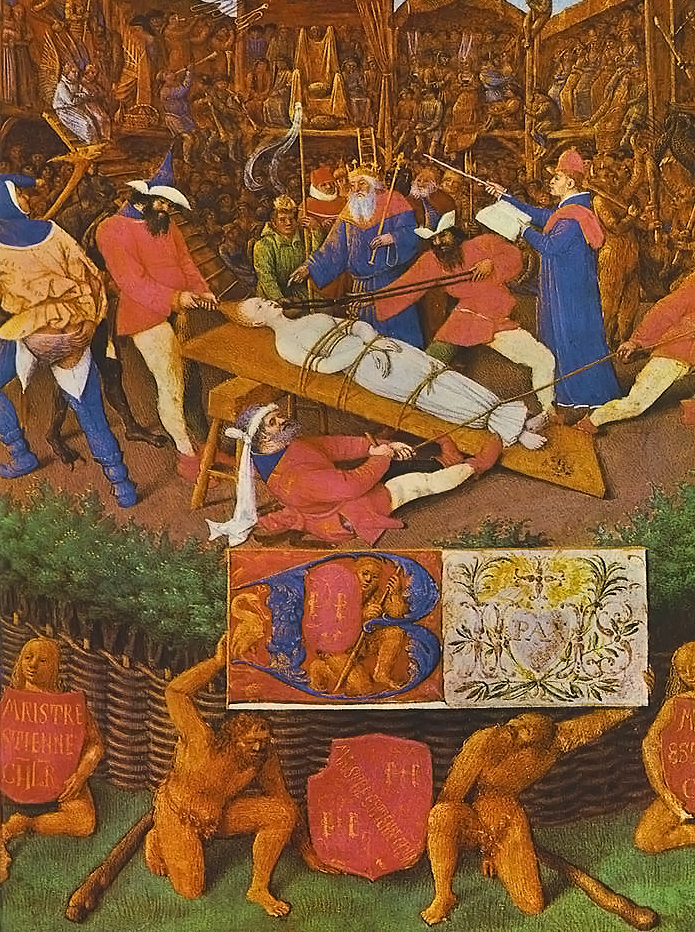
Jean Fouquet: The Martyrdom of St. Appollonia (1460), depicting the staging of a mystery play, led by a theatre director

In medieval times, the complexity of vernacular religious drama, with its large scale mystery plays that often included crowd scenes, processions and elaborate effects, gave the role of director (or stage manager or pageant master) considerable importance. A miniature by Jean Fouquet from 1460 (pictured) bears one of the earliest depictions of a director at work. Holding a prompt book, the central figure directs, with the aid of a long stick, the proceedings of the staging of a dramatization of the Martyrdom of Saint Apollonia. According to Fouquet, the director's tasks included overseeing the erecting of a stage and scenery (there were no permanent, purpose-built theatre structures at this time, and performances of vernacular drama mostly took place in the open air), casting and directing the actors (which included fining them for those that infringed rules), and addressing the audience at the beginning of each performance and after each intermission.

From Renaissance times up until the 19th century, the role of director was often carried by the actor-manager. This would usually be a senior actor in a troupe who took the responsibility for choosing the repertoire of work, staging it and managing the company. This was the case for instance with Commedia dell'arte companies and English actor-managers like Colley Cibber and David Garrick.

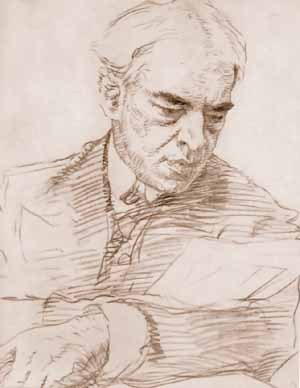
A portrait of Konstantin Stanislavski by Valentin Serov

The modern theatre director can be said to have originated in the staging of elaborate spectacles of the Meininger Company under George II, Duke of Saxe-Meiningen. The management of large numbers of extras and complex stagecraft matters necessitated an individual to take on the role of overall coordinator. This gave rise to the role of the director in modern theatre, and Germany would provide a platform for a generation of emerging visionary theatre directors, such as Erwin Piscator and Max Reinhardt. Simultaneously, Konstantin Stanislavski, principally an actor-manager, would set up the Moscow Art Theatre in Russia and similarly emancipate the role of the director as artistic visionary.

The French regisseur is also sometimes used to mean a stage director, most commonly in ballet. A more common term for theatre director in French is metteur en scène.

Post World War II, the actor-manager slowly started to disappear, and directing become a fully fledged artistic activity within the theatre profession. The director originating artistic vision and concept, and realizing the staging of a production, became the norm rather than the exception. Great forces in the emancipation of theatre directing as a profession were notable 20th-century theatre directors like Vladimir Nemirovich-Danchenko, Vsevolod Meyerhold, Yevgeny Vakhtangov, Michael Chekhov, Yuri Lyubimov (Russia), Orson Welles, Peter Brook, Peter Hall (Britain), Bertolt Brecht (Germany), Giorgio Strehler, and Franco Zeffirelli (Italy).

A cautionary note was introduced by the famed director Sir Tyrone Guthrie who said "the only way to learn how to direct a play, is ... to get a group of actors simple enough to allow you to let you direct them, and direct."

A number of seminal works on directing and directors include Toby Cole and Helen Krich's 1972 Directors on Directing: A Sourcebook of the Modern Theatre, Edward Braun's 1982 book The Director and the Stage: From Naturalism to Growtowski, and Will's The Director in a Changing Theatre (1976).

== Directing education ==
Because of the relatively late emergence of theatre directing as a performing arts profession when compared with for instance acting or musicianship, a rise of professional vocational training programmes in directing can be seen mostly in the second half of the 20th century. Most European countries nowadays know some form of professional directing training, usually at drama schools or conservatoires, or at universities. In Britain, the tradition that theatre directors emerge from degree courses (usually in English literature) at the Oxbridge universities has meant that for a long time, professional vocational training did not take place at drama schools or performing arts colleges, although an increase in training programmes for theatre directors can be witnessed since the 1970s and 1980s. In American universities, the seminal directing program at the Yale School of Drama produced a number of pioneering directors with D.F.A. (Doctor of Fine Arts) and M.F.A. degrees in Drama (rather than English) who contributed to the expansion of professional resident theaters in the 1960s and 1970s. In the early days such programmes typically led to the staging of one major thesis production in the third (final) year. At the University of California, Irvine, Keith Fowler (a Yale D.F.A. and ex-producer of two LORT companies) led for many years a graduate programme based on the premise that directors are autodidacts who need as many opportunities to direct as possible. Under Fowler, graduate student directors would stage between five and ten productions during their three-year residencies, with each production receiving detailed critiques.

As the cost of collegiate and university education has increased, service organizations and theaters have offered programs to assist directors in pathways to career success. In the United States, the largest of these is The Drama League, a service organization that offers fellowships, assistantships, residencies, and international exchanges to early and mid-career directors through its Directors Project. Stage Directors and Choreographers, the professional union of directors, also offers a number of observerships and fellowships.

As with many other professions in the performing arts, theatre directors would often learn their skills "on the job"; to this purpose, theatres often employ assistant directors or have in-house education schemes to train young theatre directors. Examples are the Royal National Theatre in London, which frequently organizes short directing courses, or the Orange Tree Theatre and the Donmar Warehouse on London's West End, which both employ resident assistant directors on a one-year basis for training purposes.

== Styles of directing ==
Directing is an art form that has grown with the development of theatre theory and theatre practice. With the emergence of new trends in theatre, so too have directors adopted new methodologies and engaged in new practices. Interpretation of the drama, by the late twentieth century, had become central to the director's work. Relativism and psychoanalytic theory influenced the work of innovative directors such as Peter Brook, Ingmar Bergman, Peter Hall, Peter Stein, and Giorgio Strehler.

Kimberly Senior, director of Disgraced on Broadway, explains her role as director by saying “I get to take things that were previously in one dimension and put them into three dimensions using my imagination and intellect and people skills.”

Once a show has opened (premiered before a regular audience), theatre directors are generally considered to have fulfilled their function. From that point forward the stage manager is left in charge of all essential concerns.

== See also ==
- Artistic director
- Dramaturge
- Improvisational theatre
- Method acting
- Presentational acting
- Regietheater
- List of film and television directors
- List of opera directors
- List of theatre directors
- Stage Directors and Choreographers Society (SDC)
