= L'esprit de l'escalier =

Thinking of the perfect reply too late

L'esprit de l'escalier or l'esprit d'escalier (UK: /lɛˌspriː d(ə l)ɛˈskæljeɪ/, US: /lɛˌspriː d(ə ˌl)ɛskəˈljeɪ/, French: [lɛspʁi d(ə l)ɛskalje]; lit. 'staircase wit') is a French term used in English for the predicament of thinking of the perfect reply too late.

== Origin ==
This name for the phenomenon comes from French encyclopedist and philosopher Denis Diderot's description of such a situation in his "Paradoxe sur le comédien" ("Paradox of the Actor"). During a dinner at the home of statesman Jacques Necker, a remark was made to Diderot which left him speechless at the time, because, he explains, "a sensitive man, such as myself, overwhelmed by the argument leveled against him, becomes confused and doesn't come to himself again until at the bottom of the stairs" ("l'homme sensible, comme moi, tout entier à ce qu'on lui objecte, perd la tête et ne se retrouve qu'au bas de l'escalier").

In this case, "the bottom of the stairs" refers to the architecture of the kind of hôtel particulier or mansion to which Diderot had been invited. In such houses, the reception rooms were on the étage noble, one floor above the ground floor. To have reached the bottom of the stairs means to have definitively left the gathering.

== In other languages ==
English speakers sometimes call this "escalator wit" or "staircase wit". An older English term that was sometimes used for this meaning is afterwit; it is used, for example, in James Joyce's Ulysses (Chapter 9).

The Yiddish trepverter 'staircase words' and the German loan translation Treppenwitz express the same idea as l'esprit de l'escalier. However, in contemporary German Treppenwitz has an additional meaning: it refers to events or facts that seem to contradict their own background or context. The frequently used phrase Treppenwitz der Weltgeschichte, 'staircase joke of world history', derives from the title of a book by that name by William Lewis Hertslet (1882; much expanded 1895) and means 'irony of history' or 'paradox of history'.

In Russian, the notion is close to the native Russian saying "задним умом крепки", zadnim umom krepki, 'our hindsight is strong'.

In Chinese, a close equivalent is "马后炮", mǎhòu pào, 'firing after the horse has passed', referring to remarks or actions that come too late to be useful.

== See also ==
- "The Comeback" (Seinfeld)
- Comic timing
- Epimetheus
- Hindsight
