= An Actor Prepares =

Book by Konstantin Stanislavski

- 1989 Routledge paperback edition
- Author: Constantin Stanislavski
- Original title: Работа актера над собой
- Translator: Elizabeth Reynolds Hapgood
- Language: English
- Subject: Acting
- Publication date: 1936
- Publication place: United States
- OCLC: 1090036
- LC Class: PN2065 .S713 1936
- Preceded by: My Life in Art
- Followed by: Building a Character

An Actor Prepares (Russian: Рабо́та актёра над собо́й, romanized: Rabóta aktyora nad sobóy, IPA: [rɐˈbotə ɐkˈtʲɵrə nət sɐˈboj]) is the first of Konstantin Stanislavski's books on acting, followed by Building a Character and Creating a Role. Stanislavski intended to publish the contents of An Actor Prepares and Building a Character as a single volume, and in the Russian language. However, An Actor Prepares was first published as a single volume in English, and World War II delayed the publication of Building a Character for more than ten years.

== Summary ==
An Actor Prepares is the diary of a fictional student named Kostya during his first year of training in Stanislavski's system. Kostya and his fellow students have little to no experience in acting. As they go through the class, Tortsov, their teacher and theatre director, addresses the many assumptions they have formed that do not coincide with the 'system'. Stanislavski relates his message with examples. He argues that his system is not a particular method, but a systematic analysis of the 'natural' order of theatrical truth.

The system that he describes is a means both of mastering the craft of acting and of stimulating the actor's individual creativeness and imagination. It has influenced the majority of performances we see on the stage or screen.

The book is autobiographical and deals with many different areas of acting skills, including action, imagination, concentration of attention, relaxation of muscles, units and objectives, faith and a sense of truth, emotion memory, communion, adaptation, inner motive forces, the unbroken line, the inner creative state, the super-objective and the subconscious mind. Tortsov, the Director, explains all these art forms in great detail, and thereby transforms An Actor Prepares into a type of textbook.

The book begins when Kostya and his fellow students are waiting for their first lesson with the Director. They are excited and nervous at the prospect of meeting him, and are surprised when he tells them that their first exercise is to put on a few scenes from a play. Kostya and one of his friends perform scenes from Othello, with Kostya taking the leading role. Afterwards, the Director tells them their mistakes.

At the end of the book, the students recall their first exercise: Sitting in a chair in a way that interests the audience, and searching for a brooch convincingly.

== Chapters ==
1. The First Test
2. When Acting Is an Art
3. Action
4. Imagination
5. Concentration of Attention
6. Relaxation of Muscles
7. Units and Objectives
8. Faith and a Sense of Truth
9. Emotion Memory
10. Adaptación
11. Inner Motive Forces
12. The Unbroken Line
13. The Inner Creative State
14. The Super-Objective
15. On the Threshold of the Subconscious

== See also ==
- Stanislavski's system
- Method acting
