= Creating a Role =

- Author: Konstantin Stanislavski
- Translator: Elizabeth Reynolds Hapgood
- Language: Russian
- Subject: Acting
- Published: 1957; 1961 (Theatre Art Books)
- Publication place: Soviet Union
- Media type: Print
- Preceded by: Building a Character

Creating a Role is theatre actor/director Constantin Stanislavski's third and final book on his method for learning the art of acting. It was first published in Russian in 1957; Theatre Art Books published an English-language edition, translated by Elizabeth Reynolds Hapgood, in 1961.

In the two preceding installments, An Actor Prepares (1936) and Building a Character (1948), Stanislavski describes ways in which an actor imagines the lived experience of their character, and then expresses that inner life and persona through speech and movement. Creating a Role applies these principles to rehearsal, in which the actor improves their understanding of the role, and how it fits the script.

== Contents ==
Part I: Griboyedov's Woe from Wit

1. The Period of Study
2. The Period of Emotional Experience
3. The Period of Physical Embodiment

Part II: Shakespeare's Othello

4. First Acquaintance
5. Creating the Physical Life of a Role
6. Analysis
7. Checking Work Done and Summing Up

Part III: Gogol's The Inspector General

8. From Physical Actions to Living Image

Appendices

1. Supplement to Creating a Role
2. Improvisations on Othello

== See also ==
- Stanislavski's system
- Method acting
