= Method acting =

Training and rehearsal techniques

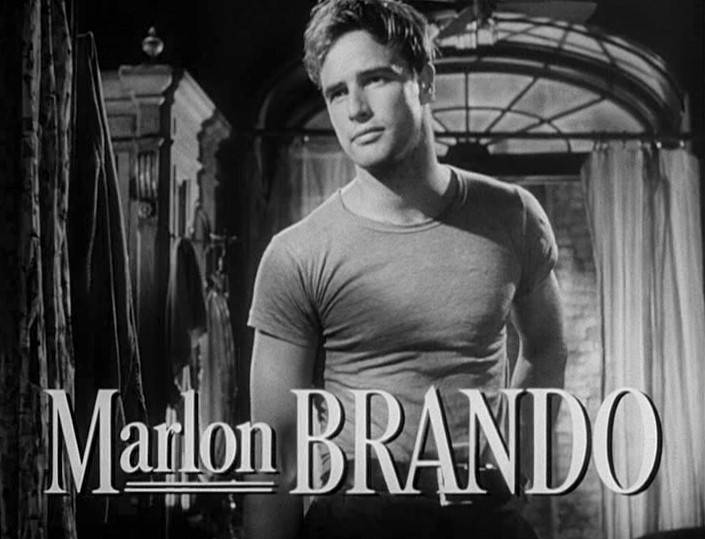
Marlon Brando's performance in Elia Kazan's A Streetcar Named Desire (1951) is an example of Stanislavski-based acting in cinema.

Method acting, known as the Method, is a group of rehearsal techniques that seek to encourage sincere and expressive performances through identifying with, understanding, and experiencing a character's inner motivation and emotions. Theatre practitioners built these techniques on Stanislavski's system, developed by the Russian and Soviet actor and director Konstantin Stanislavski and captured in his books An Actor Prepares, Building a Character, and Creating a Role.

The American version of this approach was developed and labeled "the Method" primarily by Lee Strasberg, who co-founded the Group Theatre in New York in 1931. Key members Stella Adler and Sanford Meisner eventually rejected aspects of Strasberg's technique and left the group. Adler was the only member of the Group Theatre to study with Stanislavski. Strasberg, Adler and Meisner all became noted acting teachers with differing approaches to the Method. Between them they helped train many prominent American stage and film actors of the post-World War II generation.

== History and development ==
"The Method" is an elaboration of the "system" of acting developed by the Russian theatre practitioner Konstantin Stanislavski (1863–1938). In the first three decades of the 20th century, Stanislavski organized his training, preparation, and rehearsal techniques into a coherent methodology. The "method" brought together and built on the director-centred unified aesthetic and disciplined ensemble approach of the Meiningen company; the actor-centred realism of the Maly Theatre; and the naturalistic staging of André Antoine and the independent theatre movement.

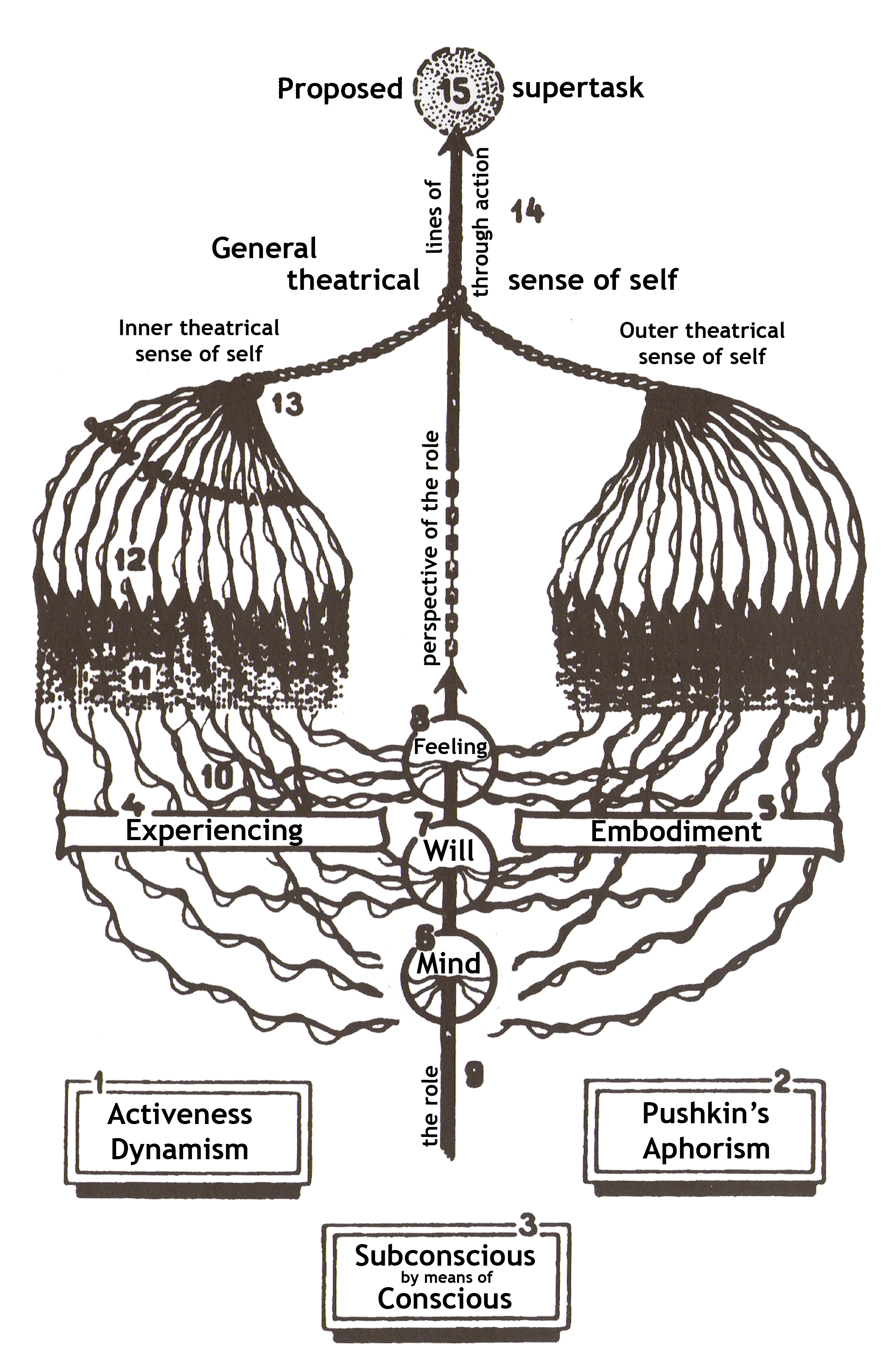
A diagram of Stanislavski's "system", based on his "Plan of Experiencing" (1935)

The "system" cultivates what Stanislavski calls the "art of experiencing", to which he contrasts the "art of representation". It mobilizes the actor's conscious thought and will to activate other, less-controllable psychological processes, such as emotional experience and subconscious behavior, sympathetically and indirectly. In rehearsal, the actor searches for inner motives to justify action and the definition of what the character seeks to achieve at any given moment (a "task").

Stanislavski later elaborated the "system" with a more physically grounded rehearsal process, the "Method of Physical Action". Minimizing at-the-table discussions, he began to encourage an "active analysis", in which the sequence of dramatic situations are improvised. "The best analysis of a play", Stanislavski argued, "is to take action in the given circumstances."

Another important influence on the Method were the ideas and techniques of Yevgeny Vakhtangov. Vakhtangov's "object exercises" were developed by Uta Hagen to train actors and maintain their skills. Strasberg attributed to Vakhtangov the distinction between Stanislavski's process of "justifying" behavior with the inner motivational forces that prompt that behavior in the character and the "motivating" behavior with imagined or recalled experiences relating to the actor and substituted for those relating to the character. Following this distinction, actors ask themselves, "What would motivate me, the actor, to behave in the way the character does?" The contrast is the Stanislavskian question, "Given the particular circumstances of the play, how would I behave, what would I do, how would I feel, how would I react?"

=== United States ===
In the United States, the transmission of the earliest phase of Stanislavski's work via the students of the First Studio of the Moscow Art Theatre (MAT) revolutionized acting in the West. When the MAT toured the US in the early 1920s, Richard Boleslawski, one of Stanislavski's students from the First Studio, presented a series of lectures on the "system" that were eventually published as Acting: The First Six Lessons (1933). The interest generated led to a decision by Boleslawski and Maria Ouspenskaya (another student at the First Studio who later became an acting teacher) to emigrate to the US and to establish the American Laboratory Theatre.

However, the version of Stanislavski's practice these students took to the US with them was that developed in the 1910s, rather than the more fully elaborated version of the "system" detailed in Stanislavski's acting manuals from the 1930s, An Actor's Work and An Actor's Work on a Role. The first half of An Actor's Work, which treated the psychological elements of training, was published in a heavily abridged and misleadingly translated version in the US as An Actor Prepares in 1936. English-language readers often confused the first volume on psychological processes with the "system" as a whole. Many of the American practitioners who came to be identified with the Method were taught by Boleslawski and Ouspenskaya at the American Laboratory Theatre. The approaches to acting subsequently developed by their students—including Lee Strasberg, Stella Adler, and Sanford Meisner—are often confused with Stanislavski's "system".

Stella Adler, an actress and acting teacher whose students included Marlon Brando, Warren Beatty, and Robert De Niro, also broke with Strasberg after she studied with Stanislavski. Her version of the method is based on the idea that actors should stimulate emotional experience by imagining the scene's "given circumstances", rather than recalling experiences from their own lives. Adler's approach also seeks to stimulate the actor's imagination through the use of "as ifs", which substitute more personally affecting imagined situations for the circumstances experienced by the character.

Alfred Hitchcock described his work with Montgomery Clift in I Confess as difficult "because you know, he was a method actor". He recalled similar problems with Paul Newman in Torn Curtain. Lillian Gish quipped: "It's ridiculous. How would you portray death if you had to experience it first?" Charles Laughton, who worked closely for a time with Bertolt Brecht, argued that "Method actors give you a photograph", while "real actors give you an oil painting."

During the filming of Marathon Man (1976), Laurence Olivier, who had lost patience with Marilyn Monroe over her Method acting two decades earlier while filming The Prince and the Showgirl (1957), was said to have quipped to Dustin Hoffman, after Hoffman stayed up all night to match his character's situation, that Hoffman should "try acting ... It's so much easier." In an interview on Inside the Actors Studio, Hoffman said that this story had been distorted: he had been up all night at a nightclub for personal rather than professional reasons and Olivier, who understood this, was joking.

Strasberg's students included many prominent American actors of the latter half of the 20th century, including Paul Newman, Al Pacino, George Peppard, Dustin Hoffman, James Dean, Marilyn Monroe, Jane Fonda, Jack Nicholson, and Mickey Rourke.

=== Henry Irving's dual consciousness system ===
The techniques used by the English actor Henry Irving, who died in 1905, are a precursor to the established ideas about method acting. These were described by Bram Stoker, author of Dracula, in two chapters of his book Personal Reminiscences of Henry Irving, published in 1907. Stoker had worked in close cooperation with Irving as the business manager of the Lyceum Theatre in London, which Irving owned.

In the book, Stoker wrote in particular:

Irving and I were alone together one hot afternoon in August 1889, crossing in the steamer from Southsea to the Isle of Wight, and were talking of that phase of Stage Art which deals with the conception and development of character. In the course of our conversation, whilst he was explaining to me the absolute necessity of an actor's understanding the prime qualities of a character in order that he may make it throughout consistent, he said these words: "If you do not pass a character through your own mind it can never be sincere". I was much struck with the phrase... Lest I should forget the exact words I wrote them then and there in my pocket-book. I entered them later in my diary. p. 244

Quoting Irving: "It is most important that an actor should learn that he is a figure in a picture, and that the least exaggeration destroys the harmony of the composition. All the members of the company should work toward a common end, with the nicest subordination of their individuality to the general purpose." p. 252

And quoting Irving again: "Has not the actor who can... make his feelings a part of his art an advantage over the actor who never feels, but makes his observations solely from the feelings of others? It is necessary to this art that the mind should have, as it were, a double consciousness, in which all the emotions proper to the occasion may have full swing, while the actor is all the time on the alert for every detail of his method... The actor who combines the electric force of a strong personality with a mastery of the resources of his art, must have a greater power over his audiences than the passionless actor who gives a most artistic simulation of the emotions he never experiences." p. 256

"For the purely monkey arts of life there is no future they stand only in the crude glare of the present, and there is no softness for them, in the twilight of either hope or memory. With the true artist the internal force is the first requisite the external appearance being merely the medium through which this is made known to others." p. 257.

"If an actor has to learn of others often primarily through his own emotions, it is surely necessary that he learn first to know himself. He need not take himself as a standard of perfection though poor human nature is apt to lean that way; but he can accept himself as something that he knows. If he cannot get that far he will never know anything. With himself then, and his self-knowledge as a foothold, he may begin to understand others." p. 258

It has been suggested that Bram Stoker used Irving's techniques to help him capture authenticity of tone while writing Dracula.

== Techniques ==
Among the concepts and techniques of Method acting are substitution, "as if", sense memory, affective memory, and animal work (all of which were first developed by Stanislavski). Contemporary Method actors sometimes seek help from psychologists in the development of their roles.

In Strasberg's approach, actors make use of experiences from their own lives to bring them closer to the experience of their characters. This technique, which Stanislavski came to call emotion memory (Strasberg tends to use the alternative formulation, "affective memory"), involves the recall of sensations involved in experiences that made a significant emotional impact on the actor. Without faking or forcing, actors allow those sensations to stimulate a response and try not to inhibit themselves.

Stanislavski also took great interest in Perezhivanie ("re-living," particularly emotional experiences) and how it could be utilized to create different characters. Perezhivanie was a term formerly used in psychology that became popularized when Stanislavski began using it as an acting approach. Stanislavski believed that actors needed to go beyond imitation and encouraged actors to explore their emotions heavily. He defended the idea that the actor needed to experience what the character was experiencing.

Stanislavski's approach rejected emotion memory except as a last resort and prioritized physical action as an indirect pathway to emotional expression. This can be seen in Stanislavki's notes for Leonidov in the production plan for Othello and in Benedetti's discussion of his training of actors at home and later abroad. Stanislavski confirmed this emphasis in his discussions with Harold Clurman in late 1935.

In training, as distinct from rehearsal process, the recall of sensations to provoke emotional experience and the development of a vividly imagined fictional experience remained a central part both of Stanislavski's and the various Method-based approaches that developed out of it.

While Strasberg focused on the memory-recall aspect of the method, Adler's approach centered on the idea that actors should find truth in the script, inner emotions, experiences, and circumstances of the character. Her teachings have been carried on through Larry Moss, a successor and student of Adler. Moss is the author of the acting textbook The Intent to Live, in which he maintains the basic training of Adler's techniques. The book introduces "given circumstances", which are the facts about the character given in the script, and "interpretation", which is the truths about the character not given in the script. This constitutes the actor's assumptions about the character they are playing.

According to Moss, there are three things that an actor needs to know about their character to find truth in their performance. These things are objectives, obstacles, and intentions. The "objective" is what a character needs to fulfill in a given scene. The "super objective" is the character's wishes or dreams throughout the entire story. "Obstacle" is what stands in the way of the character's objectives. "Intention" comprises the actions a character takes to overcome obstacles and achieve objectives. Moss advocates the position that if an actor understands these facts about their character, they will be able to find truth in their performance, creating a realistic presentation. Moss emphasizes this by claiming that the actor does not want to become the character, rather, the character lives through the actor's justification of the character's truths within themselves.

== Psychological effects ==
Method acting has been studied for the possible effects it has on the actor's physical and emotional well-being. Oftentimes, method actors delve into previous emotional experiences, be they joyful or traumatic. The psychological effects, like emotional fatigue, come when suppressed or unresolved raw emotions are dredged up to add to the character, not just from employing personal emotions in performance. On the other hand, it has been suggested that actors have stronger emotional regulation. This may be due to the actor's constant need to conjure up certain emotions and have control over them.

Fatigue, or emotional fatigue, comes mainly when actors "create dissonance between their actions and their actual feelings". A mode of acting referred to as "surface acting" involves only changing one's actions without altering the deeper thought processes. Method acting, when employed correctly, is mainly deep acting, or changing thoughts as well as actions, proven to generally avoid excessive fatigue. Surface acting is statistically "positively associated with a negative mood and this explains some of the association of surface acting with increased emotional exhaustion". This negative mood that is created leads to fear, anxiety, feelings of shame and sleep deprivation.

Raw emotion (unresolved emotions conjured up for acting) may result in sleep deprivation and the cyclical nature of the ensuing side effects. Sleep deprivation alone can lead to impaired function, causing some individuals to have "acute episodes of psychosis". Sleep deprivation initiates chemical changes in the brain that can lead to behavior similar to psychotic individuals. These episodes can lead to more lasting psychological damage. In cases where raw emotion that has not been resolved, or traumas have been evoked before closure has been reached by the individual, the emotion can result in greater emotional instability and an increased sense of anxiety, fear or shame.

However, method acting and acting as a whole can also pose a lot of benefits to the actor. Research has found that actors have a strong theory of mind (the capacity to understand other people by ascribing mental states to them), and that acting can improve one's skills in empathy (the capacity to understand other people's emotional states). It has been argued that children trained in the Method can better understand their own emotions and the emotions of others. Actors have also been found to have increased memory skills. A study found that when non-actors were taught the memorization techniques actors used, their memory increased significantly.

== Misconceptions ==
Method acting is frequently misunderstood in popular culture, often being reduced to extreme or sensationalized behaviors. One of the most common misconceptions is that method acting requires performers to remain in character at all times, including offstage or outside of filming. Woody Allen, in an early standup comedy routine, satirized this idea by describing himself method acting the role of God on the streets of New York. However, industry sources such as Backstage clarify that method acting is a structured set of techniques designed to help actors access emotional authenticity during performance, rather than a requirement for continuous immersion.

In his book A Dream of Passion, Strasberg wrote that Stanislavski, early in his directing career, "require[d] his actors to live 'in character' off stage", but that "the results were never fully satisfactory". Stanislavski did experiment with this approach in his own acting before he became a professional actor and founded the Moscow Art Theatre, though he soon abandoned it. Some Method actors employ this technique, such as Daniel Day-Lewis, but Strasberg did not include it as part of his teachings and it "is not part of the Method approach".

== See also ==
- Ivana Chubbuck
- Ion Cojar
- List of acting techniques
- Konstantin Stanislavski

== General and cited sources ==
=== Primary sources ===
- Adler, Stella. 2000. The Art of Acting. Ed. Howard Kissel. New York: Applause. ISBN 978-1-55783-373-0.
- Adler, Stella. 1990. The Technique of Acting. New York: Bantam. ISBN 978-0-553-34932-0.
- Hagen, Uta and Haskel Frankel. 1973. Respect for Acting. New York: Macmillan. ISBN 0-02-547390-5.
- Hagen, Uta. 1991. A Challenge for the Actor. New York: Scribner. ISBN 0-684-19040-0.
- Meisner, Sanford, and Dennis Longwell. 1987. Sanford Meisner on Acting. New York: Vintage. ISBN 978-0-394-75059-0.
- Stanislavski, Konstantin. 1936. An Actor Prepares. London: Methuen, 1988. ISBN 0-413-46190-4.
- Stanislavski, Konstantin. 1938. An Actor's Work: A Student's Diary. Trans. and ed. Jean Benedetti. London and New York: Routledge, 2008. ISBN 0-415-42223-X.
- Stanislavski, Konstantin. 1957. An Actor's Work on a Role. Trans. and ed. Jean Benedetti. London and New York: Routledge, 2010. ISBN 0-415-46129-4.
- Strasberg, Lee. 1965. Strasberg at the Actors Studio: Tape-Recorded Sessions. Ed. Robert H. Hethmon. New York: Theater Communications Group.
- Strasberg, Lee. 1987. A Dream of Passion: The Development of the Method. Ed. Evangeline Morphos. New York: Plume, 1988. ISBN 978-0-452-26198-3.
- Strasberg, Lee. 2010. The Lee Strasberg Notes. Ed. Lola Cohen. London: Routledge. ISBN 978-0-415-55186-1.

=== Secondary sources ===
- Abramson, Leslie H. 2015. Hitchcock and the Anxiety of Authorship.. New York: Palgrave. ISBN 978-1-137-30970-9.
- Banham, Martin, ed. 1998. The Cambridge Guide to Theatre. Cambridge: Cambridge UP. ISBN 0-521-43437-8.
- Benedetti, Jean. 1989. Stanislavski: An Introduction. Revised edition. Original edition published in 1982. London: Methuen. ISBN 0-413-50030-6.
- Benedetti, Jean. 1998. Stanislavski and the Actor. London: Methuen. ISBN 0-413-71160-9.
- Benedetti, Jean. 1999a. Stanislavski: His Life and Art. Revised edition. Original edition published in 1988. London: Methuen. ISBN 0-413-52520-1.
- Benedetti, Jean. 1999b. "Stanislavsky and the Moscow Art Theatre, 1898–1938". In Leach and Borovsky (1999, 254–277).
- Blum, Richard A. 1984. American Film Acting: The Stanislavski Heritage. Studies in Cinema 28. Ann Arbor, MI: UMI Press.
- Braun, Edward. 1982. "Stanislavsky and Chekhov". The Director and the Stage: From Naturalism to Grotowski. London: Methuen. ISBN 0-413-46300-1. p. 59–76.
- Carnicke, Sharon M. 1998. Stanislavsky in Focus. Russian Theatre Archive Ser. London: Harwood Academic Publishers. ISBN 90-5755-070-9.
- Carnicke, Sharon M. 2000. "Stanislavsky's System: Pathways for the Actor". In Hodge (2000, 11–36).
- Carnicke, Sharon M. 2009. Stanislavsky in Focus: An Acting Master for the Twenty-First Century. 2nd ed. of Carnicke (1998). Routledge Theatre Classics. London: Routledge. ISBN 978-0-415-77497-0.
- Counsell, Colin. 1996. Signs of Performance: An Introduction to Twentieth-Century Theatre. London and New York: Routledge. ISBN 0-415-10643-5.
- Daily Telegraph, The. 2013. "The Method Madness of Daniel Day-Lewis Archived 2024-02-22 at the Wayback Machine". The Daily Telegraph 23 January 2013. Web. Accessed 13 August 2016.
- Encyclopædia Britannica. 2013. "Stella Adler (American Actress) Archived 2024-06-11 at the Wayback Machine". Encyclopædia Britannica Online. Web. 27 October 2011.
- Flom, Eric L. 2009. Silent Film Stars on the Stages of Seattle: A History of Performances by Hollywood Notables. Jefferson, NC: McFarland. ISBN 978-0-7864-3908-9.
- French, Philip. 2008. "Philip French's Screen Legends: Charles Laughton". The Guardian. 21 September 2008. Web. Accessed 31 August 2016.
- Gallagher-Ross, Jacob. 2018. "Theaters of the Everyday". Evanston: Northwestern University Press.ISBN 978-0810136663.
- Golub, Spencer. 1998. "Stanislavsky, Konstantin (Sergeevich)". In Banham (1998, 1032–1033).
- Gordon, Marc. 2000. "Salvaging Strasberg at the Fin de Siècle". In Krasner (2000, 43–60).
- Gordon, Robert. 2006. The Purpose of Playing: Modern Acting Theories in Perspective. Ann Arbor: U of Michigan P. ISBN 0-472-06887-3.
- Gussow, Mel. 1982. "Obituary: Lee Strasberg of Actors Studio Dead Archived 2017-04-10 at the Wayback Machine". The New York Times 18 February 1982. Web. Accessed 4 March 2014.
- Hayward, Susan. 1996. Key Concepts in Cinema Studies. Key Concepts ser. London: Routledge. ISBN 978-0-415-10719-8.
- Hodge, Alison, ed. 2000. Twentieth-Century Actor Training. London and New York: Routledge. ISBN 0-415-19452-0.
- Hull, S. Loraine. 1985. Strasberg's Method as Taught by Lorrie Hull. Woodbridge, CN: Ox Bow. ISBN 0-918024-39-0.
- Innes, Christopher, ed. 2000. A Sourcebook on Naturalist Theatre. London and New York: Routledge. ISBN 0-415-15229-1.
- Kase, Larina. 2011. Clients, Clients, and More Clients!: Create an Endless Stream of New Business with the Power of Psychology. New York: McGraw–Hill. ISBN 0-07-177100-X.
- Krasner, David, ed. 2000a. Method Acting Reconsidered: Theory, Practice, Future. New York: St. Martin's P. ISBN 978-0-312-22309-0.
- Krasner, David. 2000b. "Strasberg, Adler, Meisner: Method Acting". In Hodge (2000, 129–150).
- Leach, Robert. 2004. Makers of Modern Theatre: An Introduction. London: Routledge. ISBN 0-415-31241-8.
- Leach, Robert, and Victor Borovsky, eds. 1999. A History of Russian Theatre. Cambridge: Cambridge UP. ISBN 0-521-43220-0.
- Lewis, Robert. 2003. Slings and Arrows: Theater in My Life. New York: Hal Leonard Corporation. ISBN 1-55783-244-7.
- Magarshack, David. 1950. Stanislavsky: A Life. London and Boston: Faber, 1986. ISBN 0-571-13791-1.
- Milling, Jane, and Graham Ley. 2001. Modern Theories of Performance: From Stanislavski to Boal. Basingstoke, Hampshire and New York: Palgrave. ISBN 0-333-77542-2.
- Roach, Joseph R. 1985. The Player's Passion: Studies in the Science of Acting. Theater:Theory/Text/Performance Ser. Ann Arbor: U of Michigan P. ISBN 0-472-08244-2.
- Skog, Jason. 2010. Acting: A Practical Guide to Pursuing the Art. Mankato, MN: Compass Point. ISBN 978-0-7565-4364-8.
- Toporkov, Vasily Osipovich. 2001. Stanislavski in Rehearsal: The Final Years. Trans. Jean Benedetti. London: Methuen. ISBN 0-413-75720-X.
- Whyman, Rose. 2008. The Stanislavsky System of Acting: Legacy and Influence in Modern Performance. Cambridge: Cambridge UP. ISBN 978-0-521-88696-3.
