= Respect for Acting =

1973 textbook by Uta Hagen

Respect for Acting is a textbook for use in acting classes written by Uta Hagen and published by Wiley Publishing in 1973. Hagen's instructions and examples guide the user through practical problems such as: "How do I talk to the audience?" and "How do I stay fresh in a long run?". She advocates the actor's use of substitution in informing and shaping the actions of the character the actor is playing.

Hagen later said that she "disassociated" herself from Respect for Acting. In a follow-up book, Challenge for the Actor (1991), she renamed "substitution" as "transference". Although Hagen wrote that the actor should "identify" the character they play with feelings and circumstances from their (the actor's) own life, she also makes it clear that "Thoughts and feelings are suspended in a vacuum unless they instigate and feed the selected actions, and it is the characters actions which reveals the true 'you'," as the character in the play.

== Critics Review ==
"Respect for Acting is a simple, lucid and sympathetic statement of actors' problems in the theatre and basic tenets for their training wrought from the personal experience of a fine actress and teacher of acting." —Harold Clurman, Theatre critic

"Uta Hagen's Respect for Acting is not only pitched on a high artistic level but it is full of homely, practical information by a superb craftswoman. An illuminating discussion of the standards and techniques of enlightened stage acting." —Brooks Atkinson, Theatre critic
