= Uta Hagen =

American actress and teacher (1919–2004)

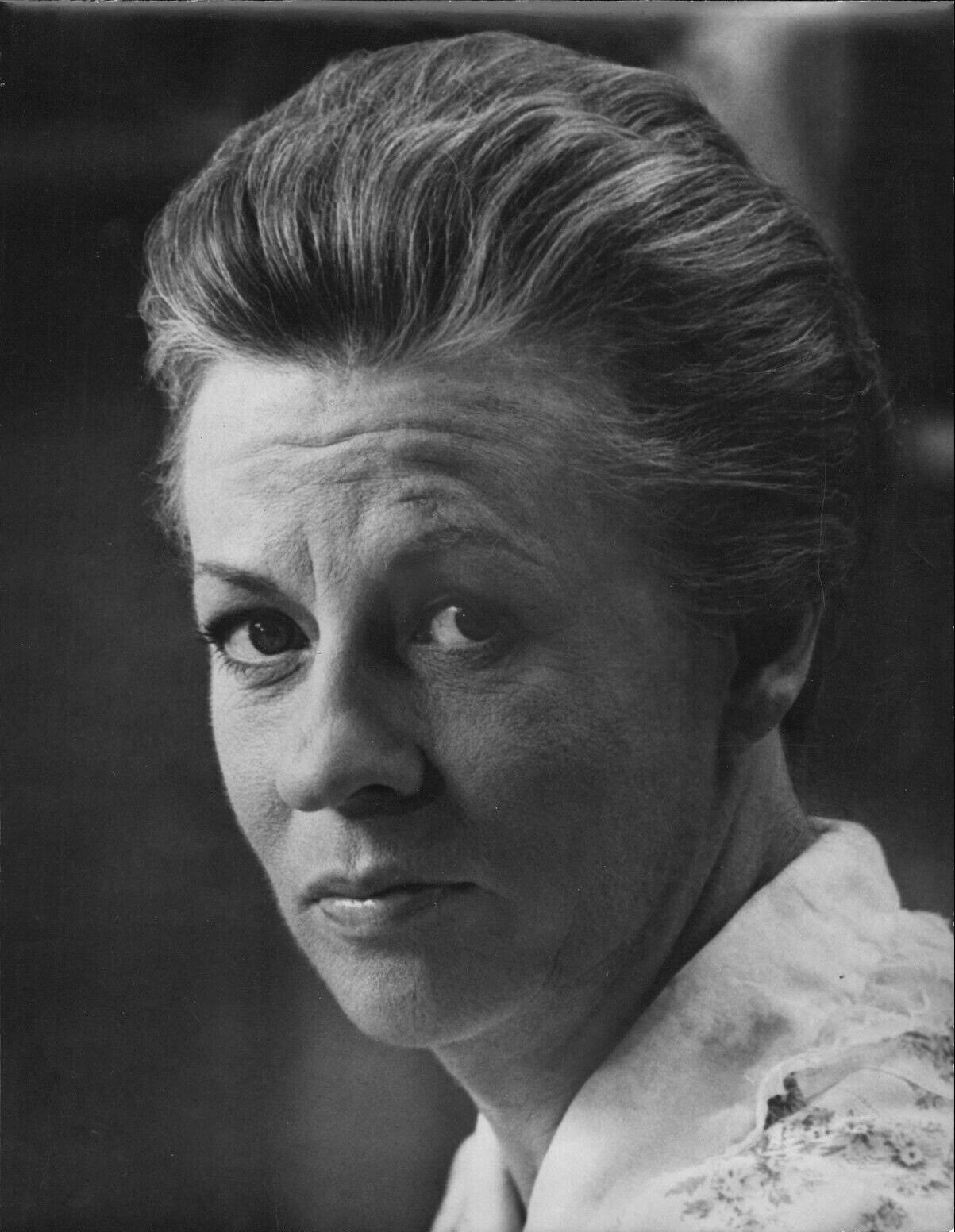
- Hagen in 1972
- Born: Uta Thyra Hagen; 12 June 1919; Göttingen, Germany
- Died: 14 January 2004 (aged 84); New York City, U.S.
- Education: University of Wisconsin–Madison, Royal Academy of Dramatic Art
- Occupations: Actress; author
- Years active: 1937–2001
- Spouses: José Ferrer (m. 1938; div. 1948) Herbert Berghof (m. 1957; died 1990)
- Children: 1

Uta Thyra Hagen (12 June 1919 – 14 January 2004) was a German and American actress and theatre practitioner. She originated the role of Martha in the 1962 Broadway premiere of Who's Afraid of Virginia Woolf? by Edward Albee, who called her "a profoundly truthful actress." Because Hagen was on the Hollywood blacklist, in part because of her association with Paul Robeson, her film opportunities dwindled and she focused her career on New York theatre.

She later became a highly influential acting teacher at New York's Herbert Berghof Studio and authored best-selling acting texts, Respect for Acting, with Haskel Frankel, and A Challenge for the Actor. Her most substantial contributions to theatre pedagogy were a series of "object exercises" that built on the work of Konstantin Stanislavski and Yevgeny Vakhtangov.

She was elected to the American Theater Hall of Fame in 1981. She twice won the Tony Award for Best Actress in a Play and received a Special Tony Award for Lifetime Achievement in 1999.

== Life and career ==
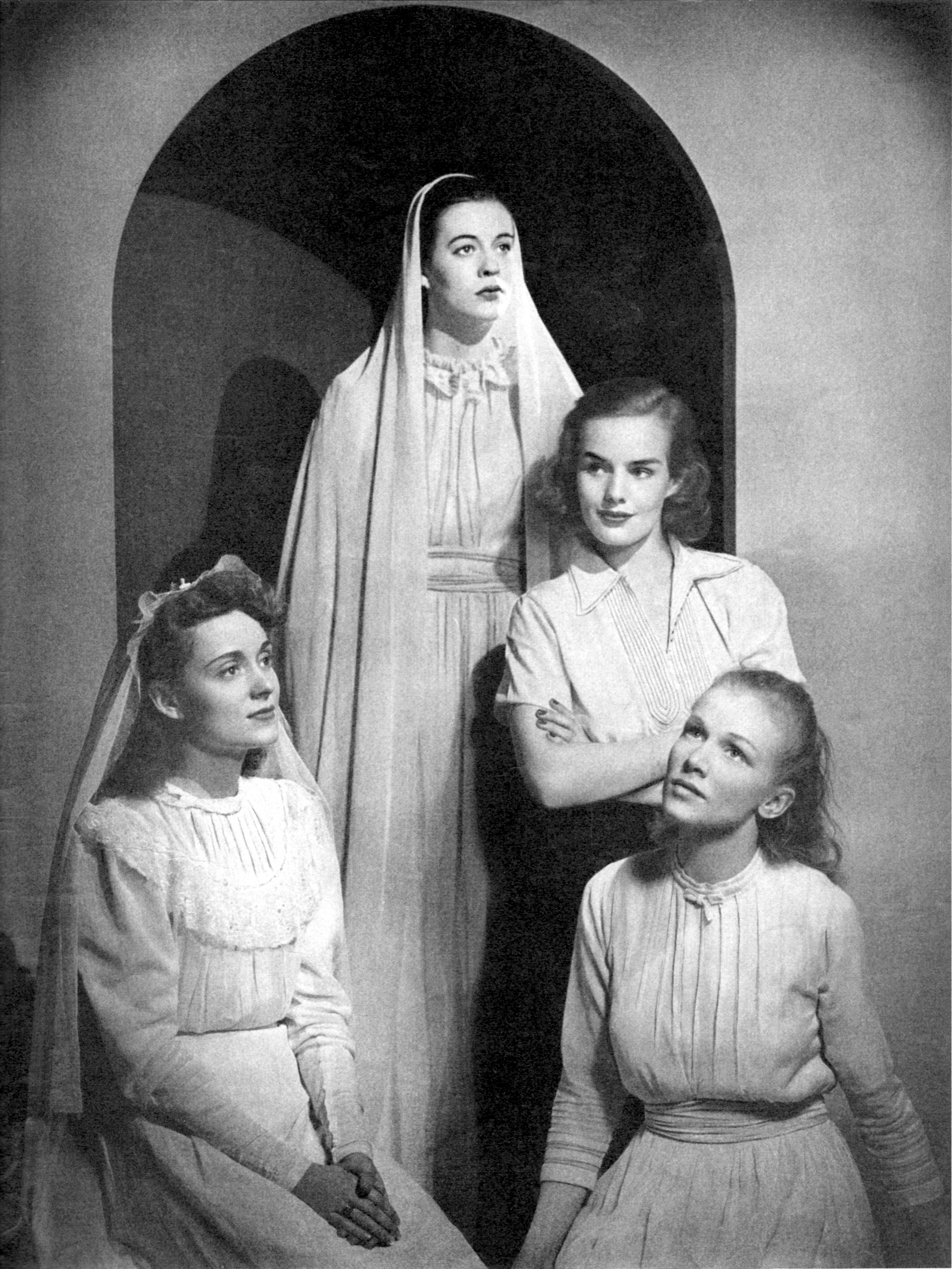
Left to right: Martha Scott, Uta Hagen, Frances Farmer, and Julie Haydon posed in Stage magazine, 1938

=== Early life ===
Born in Göttingen, Germany, daughter of Thyra A. (née Leisner), a trained opera singer, and Oskar Hagen, an art historian and musician, Hagen and her family emigrated to the United States in 1924. Uta was raised in Madison, Wisconsin; her father taught at the University of Wisconsin–Madison. Her early years in Germany were likely affected by the growing political changes in Europe, which would have added a layer of complexity to their decision to emigrate. She appeared in productions of the University of Wisconsin High School and in summer stock productions of the Wisconsin Players. She studied acting briefly at the Royal Academy of Dramatic Art in 1936. After spending one semester at the University of Wisconsin–Madison, where her father was the head of the department of art history, she left for New York City in 1937. Her first professional role was as Ophelia opposite Eva Le Gallienne in the title role of Hamlet in Dennis, Massachusetts, in 1936.

=== Career ===
Hagen was cast, early on, as Ophelia by the actress-manager Eva Le Gallienne. Hagen went on to play (at age 18) the leading ingénue role of Nina in a Broadway production of Anton Chekhov's The Seagull with Alfred Lunt and Lynn Fontanne. "The Lunts," she later stated, "were an enormous influence on my life." She admired "their passion for the theatre, and their discipline." The New York Times' critic Brooks Atkinson hailed her Nina as "grace and aspiration incarnate."

She played George Bernard Shaw's Saint Joan (1951) on Broadway, and Desdemona in a production which toured. Later she acted with Paul Robeson in Shakespeare's Othello; her then-husband José Ferrer was Iago. She took over the role of Blanche DuBois in A Streetcar Named Desire for the national tour, which was directed by Harold Clurman. In Respect for Acting, she credited her discoveries with Clurman as the springboard for what she would later explore with her husband Herbert Berghof: "how to find a true technique of acting, how to make a character flow through me." She played Blanche (on the road and on Broadway) opposite at least four different Stanley Kowalskis, including Anthony Quinn and Marlon Brando.

Primarily noted for stage roles, Hagen won her first Tony Award in 1951 for her performance as the self-sacrificing wife Georgie in Clifford Odets' The Country Girl. She won again in 1963 for originating the role of Martha in Edward Albee's Who's Afraid of Virginia Woolf?. In 1981 she was elected to the American Theater Hall of Fame and in 1999 received a "Special Lifetime Achievement Tony Award".

Although she appeared in some movies after 1972, the Hollywood blacklist limited her output in film and television. She would later comment about being blacklisted, "that fact kept me pure."

She was nominated for a Daytime Emmy Award as "Outstanding Supporting Actress in a Drama Series" for her performance on the television soap opera One Life to Live.

She taught at HB Studio, a New York City acting school. She began there in 1947, and married its co-founder, Herbert Berghof, on 25 January 1957. Hagen was an influential acting teacher who taught, among others, Matthew Broderick, Christine Lahti, Amanda Peet, Hope Davis, Jason Robards, Sigourney Weaver, Katie Finneran, Liza Minnelli, Whoopi Goldberg, Jack Lemmon, Charles Nelson Reilly, Manu Tupou, Debbie Allen, Herschel Savage, George Segal, Jon Stewart, and Al Pacino. She was a voice coach to Judy Garland, teaching her a German accent for the picture Judgment at Nuremberg. Garland's performance earned her an Academy Award nomination.

Later in life, Hagen returned to the stage, earning accolades for leading roles in Mrs. Warren's Profession (1985), Collected Stories, and Mrs. Klein. After Berghof's death in 1990, she became the school's chairperson.

She also wrote Respect for Acting (1973) and A Challenge for the Actor (1991), which advocate realistic (as opposed to "formalistic") acting. In her mode of realism, the actor puts his own psyche to use in finding identification with the role," trusting that a form will result. In Respect for Acting, Hagen credited director Harold Clurman with a turn-around in her perspective on acting:

In 1947, I worked in a play under the direction of Harold Clurman. He opened a new world in the professional theatre for me. He took away my 'tricks'. He imposed no line readings, no gestures, no positions on the actors. At first I floundered badly because for many years I had become accustomed to using specific outer directions as the material from which to construct the mask for my character, the mask behind which I would hide throughout the performance. Mr Clurman refused to accept a mask. He demanded ME in the role. My love of acting was slowly reawakened as I began to deal with a strange new technique of evolving in the character. I was not allowed to begin with, or concern myself at any time with, a preconceived form. I was assured that a form would result from the work we were doing.

Hagen later "disassociated" herself from Respect for Acting. In Challenge for the Actor, she redefined a term which she had initially called "substitution", an esoteric technique for mixing elements of an actor's life with his/her character work, calling it "transference" instead. Respect for Acting was used as a textbook for many college acting classes. She also wrote a 1976 cookbook, Love for Cooking. In 2002, she was awarded the National Medal of Arts by President George W. Bush at a ceremony held at the White House.

Harvey Korman talks about studying under her during his Archive of American Television interview in 2004. David Hyde Pierce worked with Hagen in the Richard Alfieri play Six Dance Lessons in Six Weeks, at the Geffen Playhouse in 2001. Pierce spoke at her 2004 memorial at Manhattan's Majestic Theater.

== Students of Uta Hagen ==
- Gene Wilder
- Robert De Niro
- Steve McQueen
- Tony Goldwyn
- Orson Bean
- Faye Dunaway
- James Cromwell
- Gene Hackman
- Laura Esterman
- Hal Holbrook
- Sandy Dennis
- Griffin Dunne
- Sally Kirkland
- Robert LuPone
- Barbara Feldon
- Tovah Feldshuh
- Michael Paré
- Katie Finneran
- Constance Ford
- Victor Garber
- Jerry Stiller
- Anne Meara
- Rita Gardner
- Charles Nelson Reilly
- Lee Grant
- Charles Grodin
- Eileen Heckart
- William Hickey
- Gerald Hiken
- Anne Jackson
- Harvey Korman
- Geraldine Page
- Jason Robards, Jr.
- Matthew Broderick
- Corey Parker
- Whoopi Goldberg
- Amanda Peet
- Jack Lemmon
- Lindsay Crouse
- Fritz Weaver
- Liza Minnelli
- Prunella Scales
- Kevin Sussman
- Rochelle Oliver
- Peter Boyle
- Amy Madigan
- Frances Fisher
- Elizabeth Berkley
- John Leguizamo

== Personal life ==
Uta Hagen was married to José Ferrer from 1938 until 1948. They had one child together, their daughter Leticia (born 15 October 1940). They divorced partly because of Hagen's long-concealed affair with Paul Robeson, her co-star in Othello. Hagen married Herbert Berghof on 25 January 1957, a union that lasted for 33 years until his death in 1990. Hagen died in Greenwich Village in 2004 after suffering a stroke in 2001.

=== In popular culture ===
- Her name was in the song "La Vie Bohème" from the 1996 rock opera Rent written and composed by Jonathan Larson: "To the stage, To Uta, To Buddha, Pablo Neruda too."
- In "Skipper Dan", a song that appeared on "Weird Al" Yankovic's 2009 EP Internet Leaks and 2011 album Alpocalypse, the title character, a frustrated actor working as a tour guide on the Jungle Cruise at Disneyland, states they "read my Uta Hagen and studied the Bard.

== Work ==
=== Stage ===
- The Seagull (1938)
- The Happiest Days (1939)
- Key Largo (1939)
- Vickie (1942)
- Othello (1943)
- The Whole World Over (1947)
- A Streetcar Named Desire (1947)
- The Country Girl (1950)
- Saint Joan (1951)
- In Any Language (1952)
- The Magic and The Loss (1954)
- Island of Goats (1955)
- Who's Afraid of Virginia Woolf? (1962)
- The Cherry Orchard (1968)
- You Never Can Tell (1986)
- Charlotte (1980)
- Mrs. Klein (1995)
- Collected Stories (1998)
- Six Dance Lessons in Six Weeks (2001)

=== Film ===
- The Other (1972) - Ada
- The Boys from Brazil (1978) - Frieda Maloney
- Reversal of Fortune (1990) - Maria
- Limón: A Life Beyond Words (2001) - Narrator

=== Television ===
- Victory (1945, TV Movie)
- A Month in the Country (1959) - Natalia Petrovna
- The Day Before Sunday (1970) - Annamae Whiteley
- Lou Grant (1982) - Sister Louise Frawley (segment "The Hunger")
- A Doctor's Story (1984, TV Movie) - Mrs. Hilda Reiner
- The Twilight Zone (1986) - Gloria (segment "The Library")
- Seasonal Differences (1987) - Omi
- The Sunset Gang (1991) - Sophie (segment "The Home")
- King of the Hill (1999) - Lillian (voice)
- Oz (1999) - Mama Rebadow

== Awards and nominations ==
- 1951 Tony Award, Actress—Play, The Country Girl
- 1963 Tony Award, Actress—Play, Who's Afraid of Virginia Woolf?
- 1979 Saturn Award, Best Supporting Actress, The Boys from Brazil (nominee)
- 1986 Daytime Emmy Award, Supporting Actress in a Drama Series, One Life to Live (nominee)
- 1988 Daytime Emmy Award, Outstanding Performer in Children's Programming, ABC Afterschool Specials - episode "Seasonal Differences" (nominee)
- 1999 Tony Award, Lifetime Achievement
- 1999 Fellow of the American Academy of Arts and Sciences
- 2002 National Medal of Arts

== Quotes ==
- "Once in a while, there's stuff that makes me say, 'That's what theatre's about'. It has to be a human event on the stage, and that doesn't happen very often."
- "Awards don't really mean much."

== Bibliography ==
- Hagen, Uta (1973). Respect for Acting. Macmillan. ISBN 978-0-470-22848-7.
- Hagen, Uta (1976). Love for Cooking. Macmillan. ISBN 978-0-025-47380-5.
- Hagen, Uta (1982). Sources: A Memoir. PAj Publications. ISBN 978-0-933-82654-0.
- Hagen, Uta (1991). A Challenge for the Actor. Scribner. ISBN 978-0-684-19040-2.
