= Stanislavski's system =

System to train actors

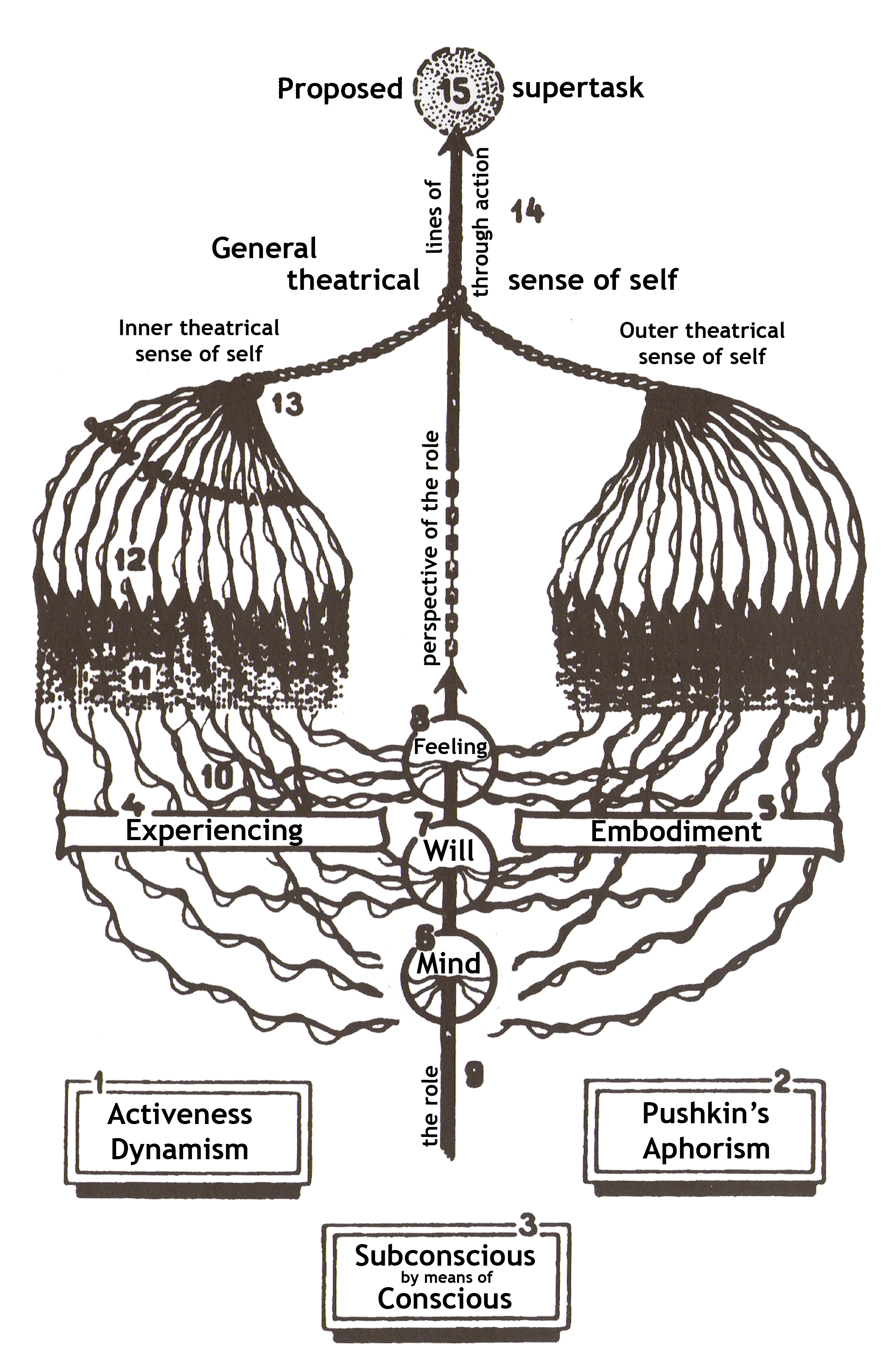
A diagram of Stanislavski's system, based on his "Plan of Experiencing" (1935), showing the inner (left) and outer (right) aspects of a role uniting in the pursuit of a character's overall "supertask" (top) in the drama.

Stanislavski's system is a systematic approach to training actors that the Russian theatre practitioner Konstantin Stanislavski developed in the first half of the twentieth century. Stanislavski's system cultivates what he calls the "art of experiencing" (with which he contrasts the "art of representation"). It mobilises the actor's conscious thought and will in order to activate other, less-controllable psychological processes—such as emotional experience and subconscious behaviour—sympathetically and indirectly. In rehearsal, the actor searches for inner motives to justify action and the definition of what the character seeks to achieve at any given moment (a "task").

Later, Stanislavski further elaborated what he called 'the System' with a more physically grounded rehearsal process that came to be known as the "Method of Physical Action". Minimising at-the-table discussions, he now encouraged an "active representative", in which the sequence of dramatic situations are improvised. "The best analysis of a play", Stanislavski argued, "is to take action in the given circumstances."

Thanks to its promotion and development by acting teachers who were former students and the many translations of Stanislavski's theoretical writings, his system acquired an unprecedented ability to cross cultural boundaries and developed a reach, dominating debates about acting in the West. According to one writer on twentieth-century theatre in London and New York, Stanislavski's ideas have become accepted as common sense so that actors may use them even without knowing.

== Stanislavski before his system ==
Having worked as an amateur actor and director until the age of 33, in 1898 Stanislavski co-founded the Moscow Art Theatre (MAT) with Vladimir Nemirovich-Danchenko and began his professional career. The two of them were resolved to institute a revolution in the staging practices of the time. Benedetti offers a vivid portrait of the poor quality of mainstream theatrical practice in Russia before the MAT:

The script meant less than nothing. Sometimes the cast did not even bother to learn their lines. Leading actors would simply plant themselves downstage centre, by the prompter's box, wait to be fed the lines then deliver them straight at the audience in a ringing voice, giving a fine display of passion and "temperament." Everyone, in fact, spoke their lines out front. Direct communication with the other actors was minimal. Furniture was so arranged as to allow the actors to face front.

Stanislavski's early productions were created without the use of his system. His first international successes were staged using an external, director-centred technique that strove for an organic unity of all its elements—in each production he planned the interpretation of every role, blocking, and the mise en scène in detail in advance. He also introduced into the production process a period of discussion and detailed analysis of the play by the cast. Despite the success that this approach brought, particularly with his Naturalistic stagings of the plays of Anton Chekhov and Maxim Gorky, Stanislavski remained dissatisfied.

Both his struggles with Chekhov's drama (out of which his notion of subtext emerged) and his experiments with Symbolism encouraged a greater attention to "inner action" and a more intensive investigation of the actor's process. He began to develop the more actor-centred techniques of "psychological realism" and his focus shifted from his productions to rehearsal process and pedagogy. He pioneered the use of theatre studios as a laboratory in which to innovate actor training and to experiment with new forms of theatre.

Throughout his career, Stanislavski subjected his acting and direction to a rigorous process of artistic self-analysis and reflection. His system of acting developed out of his persistent efforts to remove the blocks that he encountered in his performances, beginning with a major crisis in 1906.

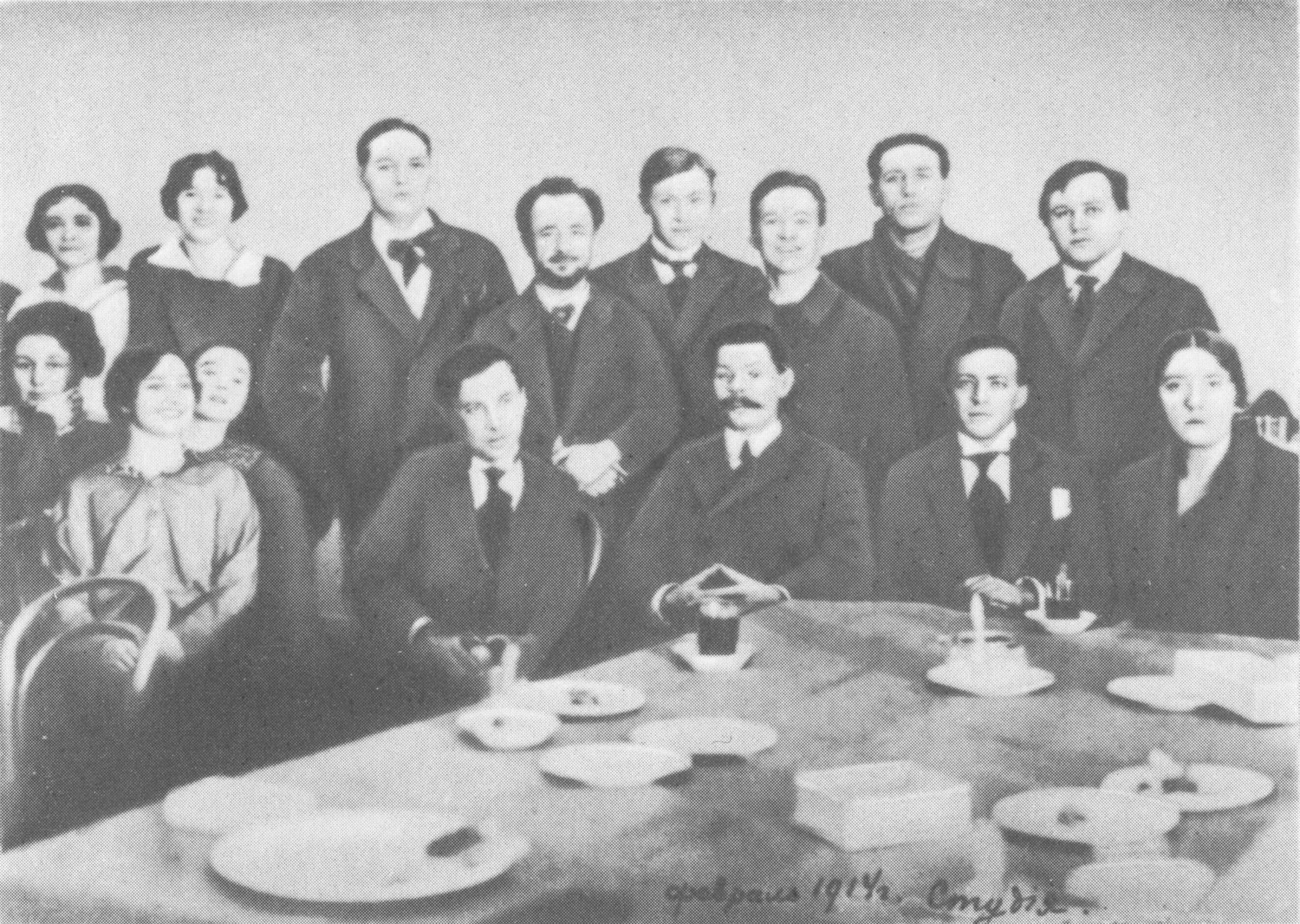
Gorky (seated, centre) with Vakhtangov (right of Gorky) and other members of the First Studio, an institution devoted to research and pedagogy, which emphasised experimentation, improvisation, and self-discovery.

Stanislavski eventually came to organise his techniques into a coherent, systematic methodology, which built on three major strands of influence: (1) the director-centred, unified aesthetic and disciplined, ensemble approach of the Meiningen company; (2) the actor-centred realism of the Maly; and (3) the Naturalistic staging of Antoine and the independent theatre movement. Stanislavski's earliest reference to his system appears in 1909, the same year that he first incorporated it into his rehearsal process. Olga Knipper and many of the other MAT actors in that production—Ivan Turgenev's comedy A Month in the Country—resented Stanislavski's use of it as a laboratory in which to conduct his experiments. At Stanislavski's insistence, the MAT went on to adopt his system as its official rehearsal method in 1911.

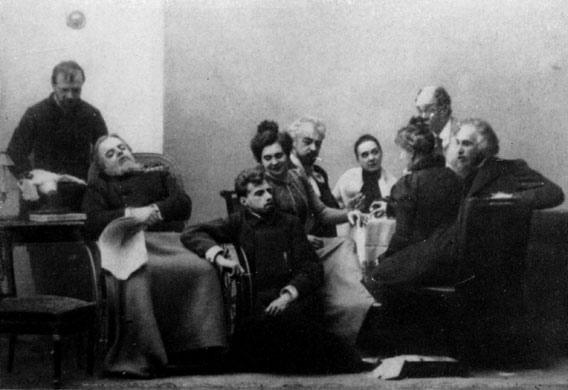
Stanislavski's production of Chekhov's The Seagull in 1898, which gave the MAT its emblem, was staged without the use of his system; Stanislavski as Trigorin (seated far right) and Meyerhold as Konstantin (on floor), with Knipper (behind).

== Experiencing the role ==
A rediscovery of the 'system' must begin with the realization that it is the questions which are important, the logic of their sequence and the consequent logic of the answers. A ritualistic repetition of the exercises contained in the published books, a solemn analysis of a text into bits and tasks will not ensure artistic success, let alone creative vitality. It is the Why? and What for? that matter and the acknowledgement that with every new play and every new role the process begins again.

— Jean Benedetti, acting teacher and Stanislavski's biographer.

This system is based on "experiencing a role." This principle demands that as an actor, you should "experience feelings analogous" to those that the character experiences "each and every time you do it." Stanislavski approvingly quotes Tommaso Salvini when he insists that actors should really feel what they portray "at every performance, be it the first or the thousandth."

Not all emotional experiences are appropriate, therefore, since the actor's feelings must be relevant and parallel to the character's experience. Stanislavski identified Salvini, whose performance of Othello he had admired in 1882, as the finest representative of the art of experiencing approach. Salvini had disagreed with the French actor Cocquelin over the role emotion ought to play—whether it should be experienced only in rehearsals when preparing the role (Cocquelin's position) or whether it ought to be felt in performance (Salvini's position).

On this basis, Stanislavski contrasts his own "art of experiencing" approach with what he calls the "art of representation" practised by Cocquelin (in which experiencing forms one of the preparatory stages only) and "hack" acting (in which experiencing plays no part). Stanislavski defines the actor's "experiencing" as playing "credibly", by which he means "thinking, wanting, striving, behaving truthfully, in logical sequence in a human way, within the character, and in complete parallel to it", such that the actor begins to feel "as one with" the role.

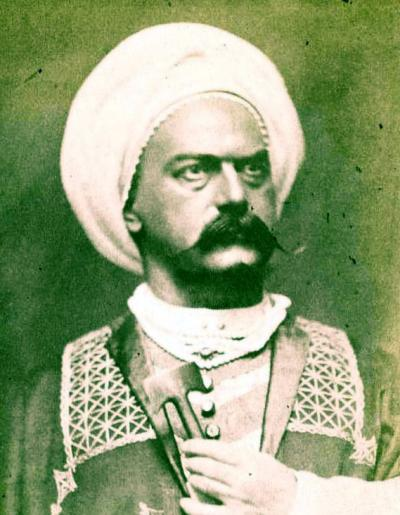
Stanislavski considered the Italian tragedian Salvini (pictured as Othello) to be the finest example of the "art of experiencing".

Stanislavski's approach seeks to stimulate the will to create afresh and to activate subconscious processes sympathetically and indirectly by means of conscious techniques. In this way, it attempts to recreate in the actor the inner, psychological causes of behaviour, rather than to present a simulacrum of their effects. Stanislavski recognised that in practice a performance is usually a mixture of the three trends (experiencing, representation, hack) but felt that experiencing should predominate.

The range of training exercises and rehearsal practices that are designed to encourage and support "experiencing the role" resulted from many years of sustained inquiry and experiment. Many may be discerned as early as 1905 in Stanislavski's letter of advice to Vera Kotlyarevskaya on how to approach the role of Charlotta in Anton Chekhov's The Cherry Orchard:

First of all you must live the role without spoiling the words or making them commonplace. Shut yourself off and play whatever goes through your head. Imagine the following scene: Pishchik has proposed to Charlotta, now she is his bride... How will she behave? Or: Charlotta has been dismissed but finds other employment in a circus of a café-chantant. How does she do gymnastics or sing little songs? Do your hair in various ways and try to find in yourself things which remind you of Charlotta. You will be reduced to despair twenty times in your search but don't give up. Make this German woman you love so much speak Russian and observe how she pronounces words and what are the special characteristics of her speech. Remember to play Charlotta in a dramatic moment of her life. Try to make her weep sincerely over her life. Through such an image you will discover all the whole range of notes you need.

Exercises such as these, though never seen directly onstage or screen, prepare the actor for a performance based on experiencing the role. Experiencing constitutes the inner, psychological aspect of a role, which is endowed with the actor's individual feelings and own personality. Stanislavski argues that this creation of an inner life should be the actor's first concern. He groups together the training exercises intended to support the emergence of experiencing under the general term "psychotechnique".

== Given circumstances and the Magic If ==
When I give a genuine answer to the if, then I do something, I am living my own personal life. At moments like that there is no character. Only me. All that remains of the character and the play are the situation, the life circumstances, all the rest is mine, my own concerns, as a role in all its creative moments depends on a living person, i.e., the actor, and not the dead abstraction of a person, i.e., the role.

— Konstantin Stanislavski.

Stanislavski's "Magic If" describes an ability to imagine oneself in a set of fictional circumstances and to envision the consequences of finding oneself facing that situation in terms of action. These circumstances are "given" to the actor principally by the playwright or screenwriter, though they also include choices made by the director, designers, and other actors. The ensemble of these circumstances that the actor is required to incorporate into a performance is called the "given circumstances". "It is easy," Carnicke warns, "to misunderstand this notion as a directive to play oneself." A human being's circumstances condition his or her character, this approach assumes. "Placing oneself in the role does not mean transferring one's own circumstances to the play, but rather incorporating into oneself circumstances other than one's own."

In preparation and rehearsal, the actor develops imaginary stimuli, which often consist of sensory details of the circumstances, in order to provoke an organic, subconscious response in performance. These "inner objects of attention" (often abbreviated to "inner objects" or "contacts") help to support the emergence of an "unbroken line" of experiencing through a performance, which constitutes the inner life of the role. An "unbroken line" describes the actor's ability to focus attention exclusively on the fictional world of the drama throughout a performance, rather than becoming distracted by the scrutiny of the audience, the presence of a camera crew, or concerns relating to the actor's experience in the real world offstage or outside the world of the drama. In a rehearsal process, at first, the "line" of experiencing will be patchy and broken; as preparation and rehearsals develop, it becomes increasingly sustained and unbroken.

When experiencing the role, the actor is fully absorbed by the drama and immersed in its fictional circumstances; it is a state that the psychologist Mihaly Csikszentmihalyi calls "flow." Stanislavski used the term "I am being" to describe it. He encouraged this absorption through the cultivation of "public solitude" and its "circles of attention" in training and rehearsal, which he developed from the meditation techniques of yoga. Stanislavski did not encourage complete identification with the role, however, since a genuine belief that one had become someone else would be pathological.

== Tasks and action ==
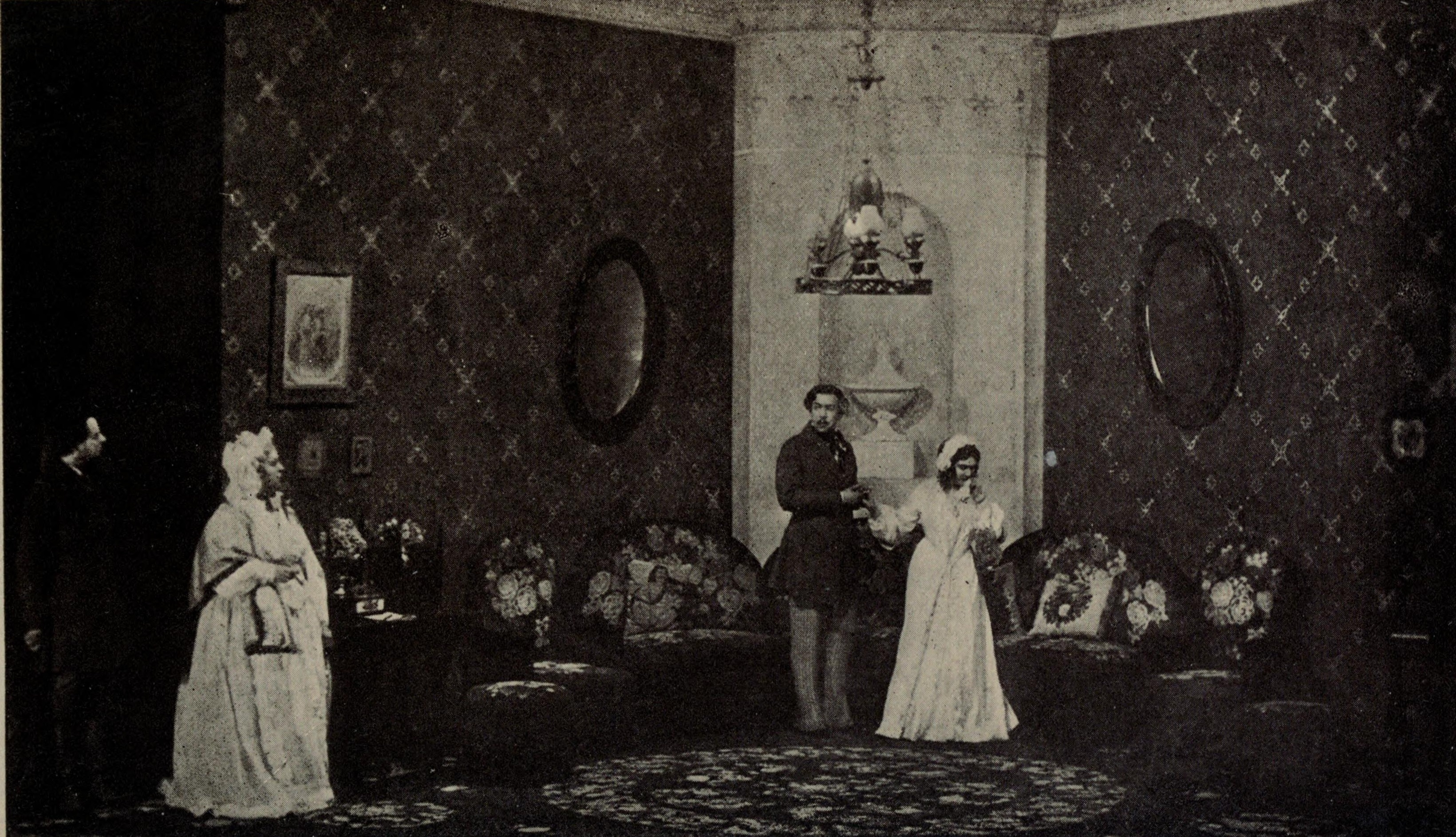
Stanislavski and Knipper (centre) in A Month in the Country (1909), the earliest recorded instance of the analysis of action in discrete "bits".

Action is the very basis of our art, and with it our creative work must begin.

— Konstantin Stanislavski.

An actor's performance is animated by the pursuit of a sequence of "tasks" (identified in Elizabeth Hapgood's original English translation as "objectives"). A task is a problem, embedded in the "given circumstances" of a scene, that the character needs to solve. This is often framed as a question: "What do I need to make the other person do?" or "What do I want?"

In preparing and rehearsing for a role, actors break up their parts into a series of discrete "bits", each of which is distinguished by the dramatic event of a "reversal point", when a major revelation, decision, or realisation alters the direction of the action in a significant way. (Each "bit" or "beat" corresponds to the length of a single motivation [task or objective]. The term "bit" is often mistranslated in the US as "beat", as a result of its pronunciation in a heavy Russian accent by Stanislavski's students who taught his system there.)

A task must be engaging and stimulating imaginatively to the actor, Stanislavski argues, such that it compels action:

One of the most important creative principles is that an actor's tasks must always be able to coax his feelings, will and intelligence, so that they become part of him, since only they have creative power. [...] The task must provide the means to arouse creative enthusiasm. Like a magnet, it must have great drawing power and must then stimulate endeavours, movements and actions. The task is the spur to creative activity, its motivation. The task is a decoy for feeling. [...] The task sparks off wishes and inner impulses (spurs) toward creative effort. The task creates the inner sources which are transformed naturally and logically into action. The task is the heart of the bit, that makes the pulse of the living organism, the role, beat.

Stanislavski's production of A Month in the Country (1909) was a watershed in his artistic development, constituting, according to Magarshack, "the first play he produced according to his system." Breaking the MAT's tradition of open rehearsals, he prepared Turgenev's play in private. The cast began with a discussion of what Stanislavski would come to call the "through-line" for the characters (their emotional development and the way they change over the course of the play). This production is the earliest recorded instance of his practice of analysing the action of the script into discrete "bits".

The pursuit of one task after another forms a through-line of action, which unites the discrete bits into an unbroken continuum of experience. This through-line drives towards a task operating at the scale of the drama as a whole and is called, for that reason, a "supertask" (or "superobjective"). A performance consists of the inner aspects of a role (experiencing) and its outer aspects ("embodiment") that are united in the pursuit of the supertask.

In his later work, Stanislavski focused more intently on the underlying patterns of dramatic conflict. He developed a rehearsal technique that he called "active analysis" in which actors would improvise these conflictual dynamics. In the American developments of Stanislavski's system—such as that found in Uta Hagen's Respect for Acting, for example—the forces opposing a characters' pursuit of their tasks are called "obstacles".

== Method of Physical Action ==
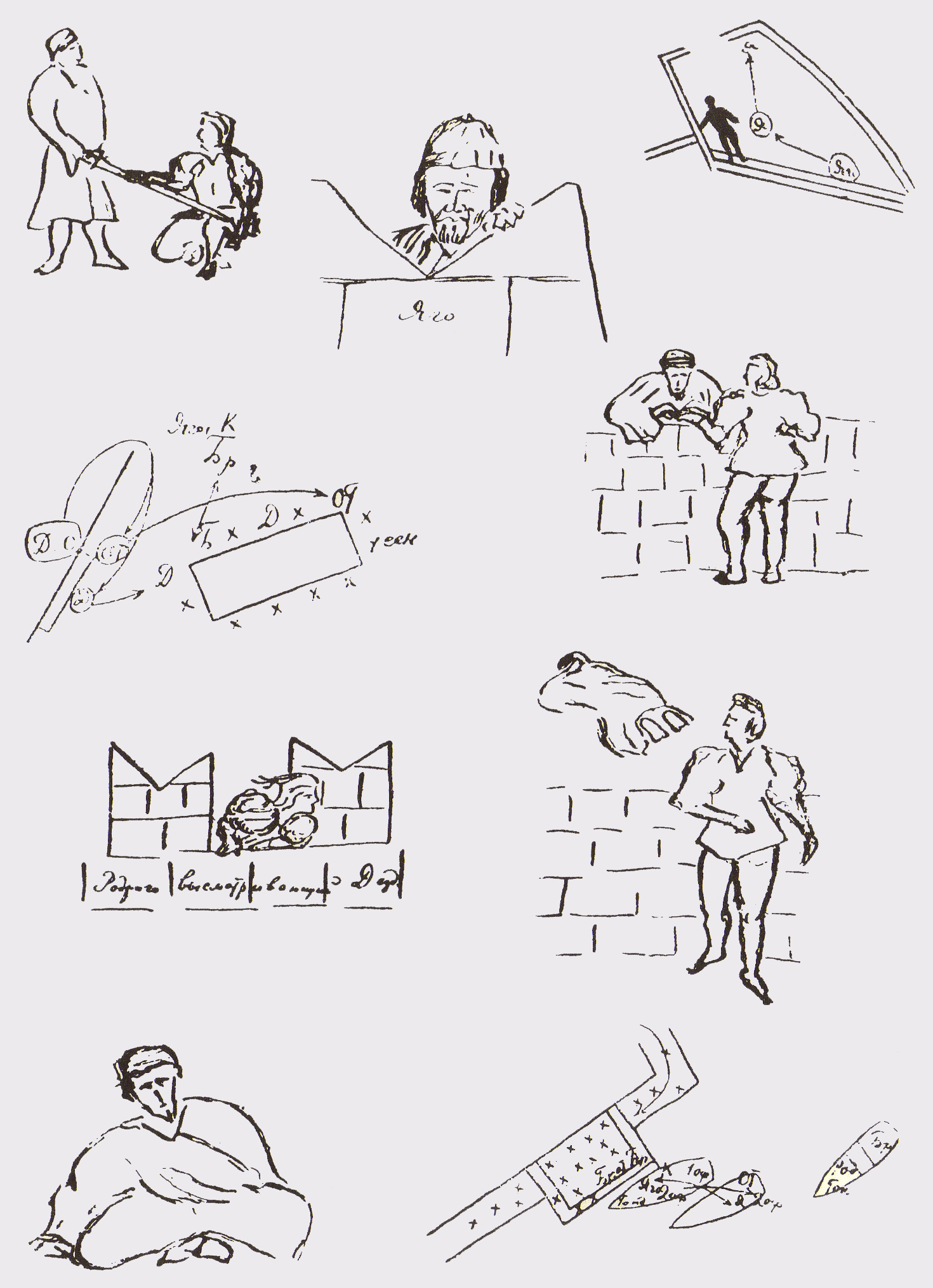
Sketches by Stanislavski in his 1929—1930 production plan for Othello, which offers the first exposition of what came to be known as his Method of Physical Action rehearsal process.

Stanislavski further elaborated his system with a more physically grounded rehearsal process that came to be known after his death as the "Method of Physical Action". Stanislavski had developed it since 1916, he first explored it practically in the early 1930s. The roots of the Method of Physical Action stretch back to Stanislavski's earliest work as a director (in which he focused consistently on a play's action) and the techniques he explored with Vsevolod Meyerhold and later with the First Studio of the MAT before the First World War (such as the experiments with improvisation and the practice of anatomising scripts in terms of bits and tasks).

Benedetti emphasises the continuity of the Method of Physical Action with Stanislavski's earlier approaches; Whyman argues that "there is no justification in Stanislavsky's [sic] writings for the assertion that the method of physical actions represents a rejection of his previous work". Stanislavski first explored the approach practically in his rehearsals for Three Sisters and Carmen in 1934 and Molière in 1935.

Minimising at-the-table discussions, he now encouraged an "active analysis", in which the sequence of dramatic situations is improvised. "The best analysis of a play", Stanislavski argued, "is to take action in the given circumstances." He continues:

For in the process of action the actor gradually obtains the mastery over the inner incentives of the actions of the character he is representing, evoking in himself the emotions and thoughts which resulted in those actions. In such a case, an actor not only understands his part, but also feels it, and that is the most important thing in creative work on the stage.

Just as the First Studio, led by his assistant and close friend Leopold Sulerzhitsky, had provided the forum in which he developed his initial ideas for his system during the 1910s, he hoped to secure his final legacy by opening another studio in 1935, in which the Method of Physical Action would be taught. The Opera-Dramatic Studio embodied the most complete implementation of the training exercises described in his manuals. Meanwhile, the transmission of his earlier work via the students of the First Studio was revolutionising acting in the West. With the arrival of Socialist realism in the USSR, the MAT and Stanislavski's system were enthroned as exemplary models.

Many actors routinely equate his system with the American Method, although the latter's exclusively psychological techniques contrast sharply with the multivariant, holistic and psychophysical approach of the "system", which explores character and action both from the 'inside out' and the 'outside in' and treats the actor's mind and body as parts of a continuum. In response to his characterisation work on Argan in Molière's The Imaginary Invalid in 1913, Stanislavski concluded that "a character is sometimes formed psychologically, i.e. from the inner image of the role, but at other times it is discovered through purely external exploration." In fact Stanislavski found that many of his students who were "method acting" were having many mental problems, and instead encouraged his students to shake off the character after rehearsing.

== Theatre studios and the development of Stanislavski's system ==
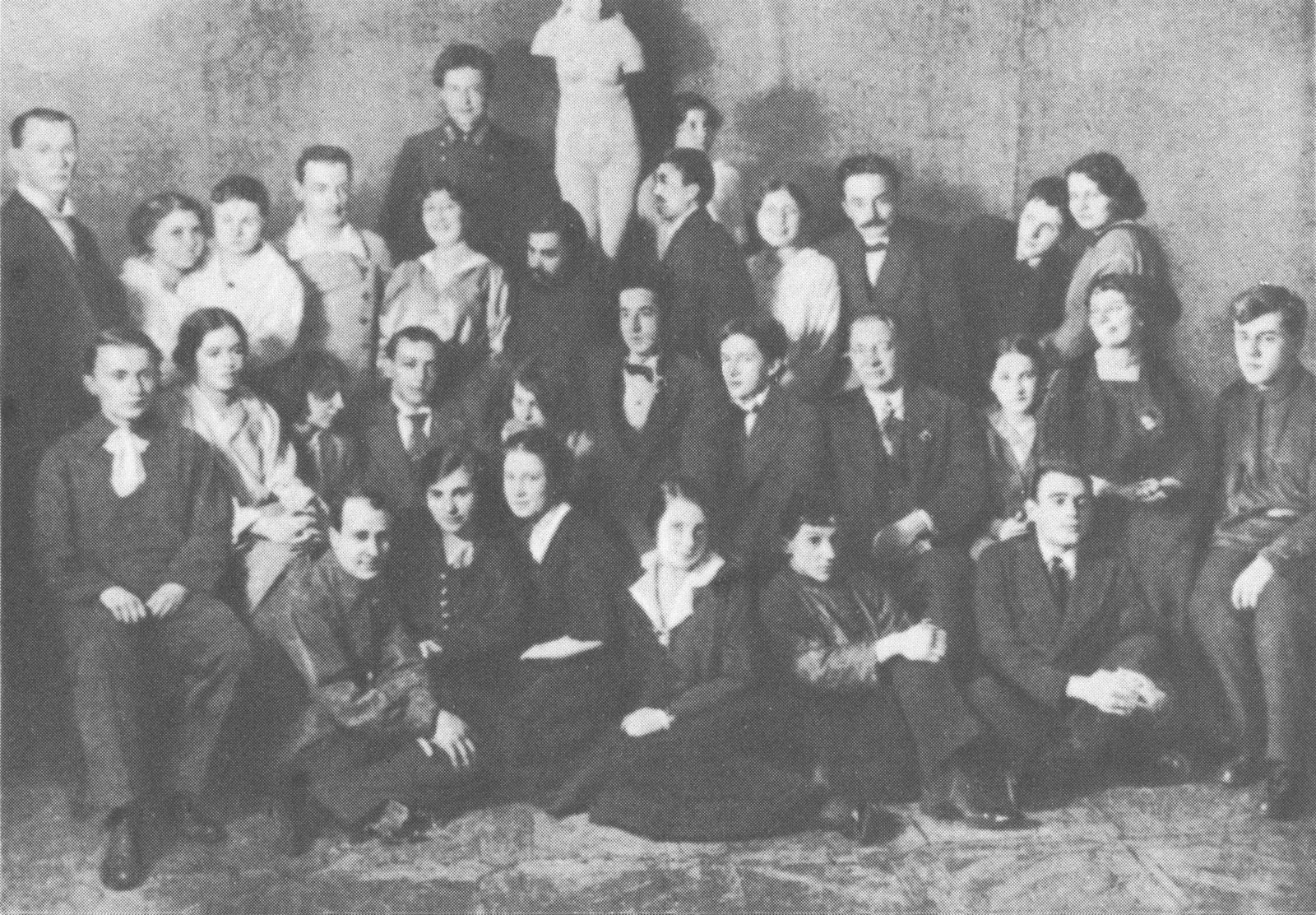
Members of Stanislavski's First Studio in 1915, a pedagogical institution in which elements of the system were first developed and taught.

I may add that it is my firm conviction that it is impossible today for anyone to become an actor worthy of the time in which he is living, an actor on whom such great demands are made, without going through a course of study in a studio.

— Konstantin Stanislavski.

=== First Studio ===
The First Studio of the Moscow Art Theatre (MAT) was a theatre studio that Stanislavski created in 1898 in order to research and develop his system. It was conceived as a space in which pedagogical and exploratory work could be undertaken in isolation from the public, in order to develop new forms and techniques. Stanislavski later defined a theatre studio as "neither a theatre nor a dramatic school for beginners, but a laboratory for the experiments of more or less trained actors." The First Studio's founding members included Yevgeny Vakhtangov, Michael Chekhov, Richard Boleslavsky, and Maria Ouspenskaya, all of whom would exert a considerable influence on the subsequent history of theatre.

Leopold Sulerzhitsky, who had been Stanislavski's personal assistant since 1905 and whom Maxim Gorky had nicknamed "Suler", was selected to lead the studio. In a focused, intense atmosphere, its work emphasised experimentation, improvisation, and self-discovery. Until his death in 1938, Suler taught the elements of Stanislavski's system in its germinal form: relaxation, concentration of attention, imagination, communication, and emotion memory. On becoming independent from the MAT in 1923, the company re-named itself the Second Moscow Art Theatre, though Stanislavski came to regard it as a betrayal of his principles.

=== Opera Studio ===
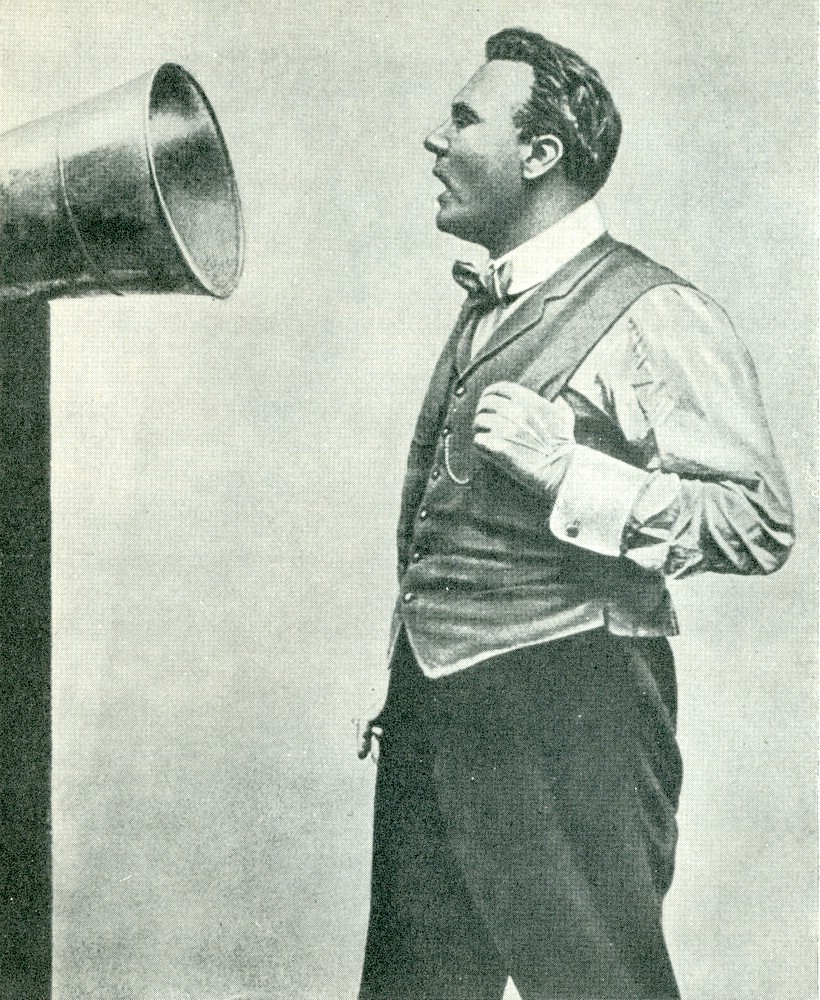
The Russian singer Feodor Chaliapin, whose approach Stanislavski hoped to combine with his system, in order to prove its universality in the crucible of the artifice and conventionality of opera.

Benedetti argues that a significant influence on the development of Stanislavski's system came from his experience teaching and directing at his Opera Studio. He created it in 1918 under the auspices of the Bolshoi Theatre, though it later severed its connection with the theatre. Stanislavski worked with his Opera Studio in the two rehearsal rooms of his house on Carriage Row (prior to his eviction in March 1921). His brother and sister, Vladimir and Zinaïda, ran the studio and also taught there. It accepted young members of the Bolshoi and students from the Moscow Conservatory. Stanislavski also invited Serge Wolkonsky to teach diction and Lev Pospekhin (from the Bolshoi Ballet) to teach expressive movement and dance.

By means of his system, Stanislavski aimed to unite the work of Mikhail Shchepkin and Feodor Chaliapin. He hoped that the successful application of his system to opera, with its inescapable conventionality, would demonstrate the universality of his methodology. From his experience at the Opera Studio he developed his notion of "tempo-rhythm", which he was to develop most substantially in part two of An Actor's Work (1938).

A series of thirty-two lectures that he delivered to this studio between 1919 and 1922 were recorded by Konkordia Antarova and published in 1939; they have been translated into English as On the Art of the Stage (1950). Pavel Rumiantsev—who joined the studio in 1920 from the Conservatory and sang the title role in its production of Eugene Onegin in 1922—documented its activities until 1932; his notes were published in 1969 and appear in English under the title Stanislavski on Opera (1975).

=== Opera—Dramatic Studio ===
Near the end of his life Stanislavski created an Opera—Dramatic Studio in his own apartment on Leontievski Lane (now known as "Stanislavski Lane"), under the auspices of which between 1935 and 1938 he offered a significant course in the system in its final form.

Given the difficulties he had with completing his manual for actors, in 1935 while recuperating in Nice Stanislavski decided that he needed to found a new studio if he was to ensure his legacy. "Our school will produce not just individuals," he wrote, "but a whole company." In June he began to instruct a group of teachers in the training techniques of the 'system' and the rehearsal processes of the Method of Physical Action. The teachers had some previous experience studying the system as private students of Stanislavski's sister, Zinaïda. His wife, Lilina, also joined the teaching staff. Twenty students (out of 3500 who had auditioned) were accepted for the dramatic section of the Opera—Dramatic Studio, where classes began on 15 November 1935. Its members included the future artistic director of the MAT, Mikhail Kedrov, who played Tartuffe in Stanislavski's unfinished production of Molière's play (which, after Stanislavski's death, he completed).

Jean Benedetti argues that the course at the Opera—Dramatic Studio is "Stanislavski's true testament." Stanislavski arranged a curriculum of four years of study that focused exclusively on technique and method—two years of the work detailed later in An Actor's Work on Himself and two of that in An Actor's Work on a Role. Once the students were acquainted with the training techniques of the first two years, Stanislavski selected Hamlet and Romeo and Juliet for their work on roles. He "insisted that they work on classics, because, 'in any work of genius you find an ideal logic and progression.'" He worked with the students in March and April 1937, focusing on their sequences of physical actions, on establishing their through-lines of action, and on rehearsing scenes anew in terms of the actors' tasks. "They must avoid at all costs," Benedetti explains, "merely repeating the externals of what they had done the day before."

== Heritage ==
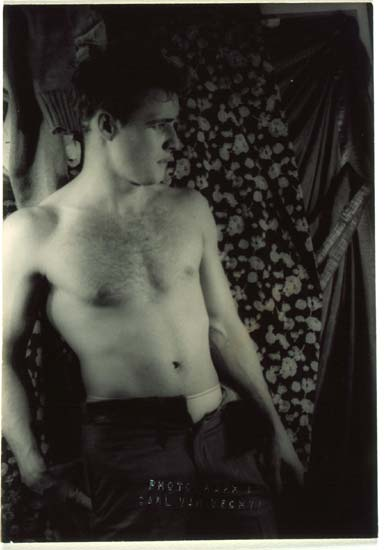
Marlon Brando's performance in A Streetcar Named Desire, directed by former Group Theatre member Elia Kazan, exemplified the power of method acting, the American development of Stanislavski's system, in the cinema of the 1950s.

Many of Stanislavski's former students taught acting in the United States, including Richard Boleslavsky, Maria Ouspenskaya, Michael Chekhov, Andrius Jilinsky, Leo Bulgakov, Varvara Bulgakov, Vera Solovyova, and Tamara Daykarhanova. Others—including Stella Adler and Joshua Logan—"grounded careers in brief periods of study" with him. Boleslavsky and Ouspenskaya went on to found the influential American Laboratory Theatre (1923—1933) in New York, which they modeled on the First Studio. Boleslavsky's manual Acting: The First Six Lessons (1933) played a significant role in the transmission of Stanislavski's ideas and practices to the West. In the Soviet Union, meanwhile, another of Stanislavski's students, Maria Knebel, sustained and developed his rehearsal process of "active analysis", despite its formal prohibition by the state.

In the United States, one of Boleslavsky's students, Lee Strasberg, went on to co-found the Group Theatre (1931—1940) in New York with Harold Clurman and Cheryl Crawford. Together with Stella Adler and Sanford Meisner, Strasberg developed the earliest of Stanislavski's techniques into what came to be known as "Method acting" (or, with Strasberg, more usually simply "the Method"), which he taught at the Actors Studio. Boleslavsky thought that Strasberg over-emphasised the role of Stanislavski's technique of "emotion memory" at the expense of dramatic action.

Every afternoon for five weeks during the summer of 1934 in Paris, Stanislavski worked with Adler, who had sought his assistance with the blocks she had confronted in her performances. Given the emphasis that emotion memory had received in New York, Adler was surprised to find that Stanislavski rejected the technique except as a last resort. He recommended an indirect pathway to emotional expression via physical action. Stanislavski confirmed this emphasis in his discussions with Harold Clurman in late 1935. The news that this was Stanislavski's approach would have significant repercussions in the US; Strasberg angrily rejected it and refused to modify his approach. Adler's most famous student was actor Marlon Brando. Later, many American and British actors inspired by Brando were also adepts of Stanislavski teachings, including James Dean, Julie Harris, Al Pacino, Robert De Niro, Harvey Keitel, Dustin Hoffman, Ellen Burstyn, Daniel Day-Lewis and Marilyn Monroe.

Meisner, an actor at the Group Theatre, went on to teach method acting at New York's Neighborhood Playhouse School of the Theatre, where he developed an emphasis on what Stanislavski called "communication" and "adaptation" in an approach that he branded the "Meisner technique". Among the actors trained in the Meisner technique are Robert Duvall, Tom Cruise, Diane Keaton, and Sydney Pollack.

Though many others have contributed to the development of method acting, Strasberg, Adler, and Meisner are associated with "having set the standard of its success", though each emphasised different aspects: Strasberg developed the psychological aspects, Adler, the sociological, and Meisner, the behavioral. While each strand of the American tradition vigorously sought to distinguish itself from the others, they all share a basic set of assumptions that allows them to be grouped together.

The relations between these strands and their acolytes, Carnicke argues, have been characterised by a "seemingly endless hostility among warring camps, each proclaiming themselves his only true disciples, like religious fanatics, turning dynamic ideas into rigid dogma." Stanislavski's Method of Physical Action formed the central part of Sonia Moore's attempts to revise the general impression of Stanislavski's system arising from the American Laboratory Theatre and its teachers.

Carnicke analyses at length the splintering of the system into its psychological and physical components, both in the US and the USSR. She argues instead for its psychophysical integration. She suggests that Moore's approach, for example, accepts uncritically the teleological accounts of Stanislavski's work (according to which early experiments in emotion memory were 'abandoned' and the approach 'reversed' with a discovery of the scientific approach of behaviourism). These accounts, which emphasised the physical aspects at the expense of the psychological, revised the system in order to render it more palatable to the dialectical materialism of the Soviet state. In a similar way, other American accounts re-interpreted Stanislavski's work in terms of the prevailing popular interest in Freudian psychoanalysis. Strasberg, for example, dismissed the "Method of Physical Action" as a step backwards. Just as an emphasis on action had characterised Stanislavski's First Studio training, so emotion memory continued to be an element of his system at the end of his life, when he recommended to his directing students:

One must give actors various paths. One of these is the path of action. There is also another path: you can move from feeling to action, arousing feeling first.

"Action, 'if', and 'given circumstances'", "emotion memory", "imagination", and "communication" all appear as chapters in Stanislavski's manual An Actor's Work (1938) and all were elements of the systematic whole of his approach, which resists easy schematisation.

Stanislavski's work made little impact on British theatre before the 1960s. Joan Littlewood and Ewan MacColl were the first to introduce Stanislavski's techniques there. In their Theatre Workshop, the experimental studio that they founded together, Littlewood used improvisation as a means to explore character and situation and insisted that her actors define their character's behaviour in terms of a sequence of tasks. The actor Michael Redgrave was also an early advocate of Stanislavski's approach in Britain. The first drama school in the country to teach an approach to acting based on Stanislavski's system and its American derivatives was Drama Centre London, where it is still taught today.

Many other theatre practitioners have been influenced by Stanislavski's ideas and practices. Jerzy Grotowski regarded Stanislavski as the primary influence on his own theatre work.

== Criticism of Stanislavski's theories ==
Mikhail Bulgakov, writing in the manner of a roman à clef, includes in his novel Black Snow (Театральный роман) satires of Stanislavski's methods and theories. In the novel, the stage director, Ivan Vasilyevich, uses acting exercises while directing a play, which is titled Black Snow. The playwright in the novel sees the acting exercises taking over the rehearsals, becoming madcap, and causing the playwright to rewrite parts of his play. The playwright is concerned that his script is being lost in all of this. When he finally sees the play performed, the playwright reflects that the director's theories would ultimately lead the audience to become so absorbed in the reality of the performances that they forget the play. Bulgakov had the actual experience, in 1926, of having a play that he had written, The White Guard, directed with great success by Stanislavski at the Moscow Arts Theatre.

== See also ==
- List of acting techniques
- Russian symbolism
- Russian avant-garde
- Twentieth-century theatre
- Ivana Chubbuck
- Ion Cojar

== Sources ==
- Bablet, Denis. 1962. The Theatre of Edward Gordon Craig. Trans. Daphne Woodward. London: Methuen, 1981. ISBN 978-0-413-47880-1.
- Banham, Martin, ed. 1998. The Cambridge Guide to Theatre. Cambridge: Cambridge University Press. ISBN 0-521-43437-8.
- Benedetti, Jean. 1989. Stanislavski: An Introduction. Revised edition. Original edition published in 1982. London: Methuen. ISBN 0-413-50030-6.
- Benedetti, Jean. 1998. Stanislavski and the Actor. London: Methuen. ISBN 0-413-71160-9.
- Benedetti, Jean. 1999a. Stanislavski: His Life and Art. Revised edition. Original edition published in 1988. London: Methuen. ISBN 0-413-52520-1.
- Benedetti, Jean. 1999b. "Stanislavsky and the Moscow Art Theatre, 1898–1938". In Leach and Borovsky (1999, 254–277).
- Benedetti, Jean. 2005. The Art of the Actor: The Essential History of Acting, From Classical Times to the Present Day. London: Methuen. ISBN 0-413-77336-1.
- Blum, Richard A. 1984. American Film Acting: The Stanislavski Heritage. Studies in Cinema 28. Ann Arbor, MI: UMI Press.
- Braun, Edward. 1982. "Stanislavsky and Chekhov". The Director and the Stage: From Naturalism to Grotowski. London: Methuen. ISBN 0-413-46300-1. 59–76.
- Bulgakov, Mikhail. Black Snow (Театральный роман). Trans. Michael Glenny. Melville House; Reprint edition, 2013. ISBN 978-1-61219-214-7
- Carnicke, Sharon M. 1998. Stanislavsky in Focus. Russian Theatre Archive Ser. London: Harwood Academic Publishers. ISBN 90-5755-070-9.
- Carnicke, Sharon M. 2000. "Stanislavsky's System: Pathways for the Actor". In Hodge (2000, 11–36).
- Carnicke, Sharon Marie. 2010. "The Knebel Technique: Active Analysis in Practice." Actor Training. Ed. Alison Hodge. 2nd ed. London: Routledge. 99—116. ISBN 0-415-47168-0.
- Counsell, Colin. 1996. Signs of Performance: An Introduction to Twentieth-Century Theatre. London and New York: Routledge. ISBN 0-415-10643-5.
- Gauss, Rebecca B. 1999. Lear's Daughters: The Studios of the Moscow Art Theatre 1905–1927. American University Studies ser. 26 Theatre Arts, vol. 29. New York: Peter Lang. ISBN 0-8204-4155-4.
- Golub, Spencer. 1998. "Stanislavsky, Konstantin (Sergeevich)". In Banham (1998, 1032–1033).
- Gordon, Robert. 2006. The Purpose of Playing: Modern Acting Theories in Perspective. Ann Arbor: University of Michigan Press. ISBN 0-472-06887-3.
- Hodge, Alison, ed. 2000. Twentieth-Century Actor Training. London and New York: Routledge. ISBN 0-415-19452-0.
- Knebel, Maria. 2016. "Active Analysis of the Play and the Role." In Thomas (2016).
- Krasner, David. 2000. "Strasberg, Adler and Meisner: Method Acting". In Hodge (2000, 129–150).
- Leach, Robert. 2004. Makers of Modern Theatre: An Introduction. London: Routledge. ISBN 0-415-31241-8.
- Leach, Robert, and Victor Borovsky, eds. 1999. A History of Russian Theatre. Cambridge: Cambridge University Press. ISBN 0-521-43220-0.
- Magarshack, David. 1950. Stanislavsky: A Life. London and Boston: Faber, 1986. ISBN 0-571-13791-1.
- Mekler, Eva. 1989. Masters of the Stage: British Acting Teachers Talk About Their Craft. New York: Grove Weidenfeld. ISBN 0-8021-3190-5.
- Milling, Jane, and Graham Ley. 2001. Modern Theories of Performance: From Stanislavski to Boal. Basingstoke, Hampshire and New York: Palgrave. ISBN 0-333-77542-2.
- Mirodan, Vladimir. 1997. "The Way of Transformation: The Laban—Malmgren System of Dramatic Character Analysis." Diss. University of London: Royal Holloway College.
- Moore, Sonia. 1968. Training an Actor: The Stanislavski System in Class. New York: The Viking Press. ISBN 0-670-00249-6.
- Postlewait, Thomas. 1998. "Meisner, Sanford". In Banham (1998, 719).
- Roach, Joseph R. 1985. The Player's Passion: Studies in the Science of Acting. Theater:Theory/Text/Performance Ser. Ann Arbor: University of Michigan Press. ISBN 0-472-08244-2.
- Rudnitsky, Konstantin. 1981. Meyerhold the Director. Trans. George Petrov. Ed. Sydney Schultze. Revised translation of Rezhisser Meierkhol'd. Moscow: Academy of Sciences, 1969. ISBN 0-88233-313-5.
- Stanislavski, Konstantin. 1938. An Actor's Work: A Student's Diary. Trans. and ed. Jean Benedetti. London and New York: Routledge, 2008. ISBN 0-415-42223-X.
- Stanislavski, Konstantin. 1950. Stanislavsky on the Art of the Stage. Trans. David Magarshack. London: Faber, 2002. ISBN 0-571-08172-X.
- Stanislavski, Konstantin. 1957. An Actor's Work on a Role. Trans. and ed. Jean Benedetti. London and New York: Routledge, 2010. ISBN 0-415-46129-4.
- Stanislavski, Konstantin. 1961. Creating a Role. Trans. Elizabeth Reynolds Hapgood. London: Mentor, 1968. ISBN 0-450-00166-0.
- Stanislavski, Konstantin. 1963. An Actor's Handbook: An Alphabetical Arrangement of Concise Statements on Aspects of Acting. Ed. and trans. Elizabeth Reynolds Hapgood. London: Methuen, 1990. ISBN 0-413-63080-3.
- Stanislavski, Konstantin. 1968. Stanislavski's Legacy: A Collection of Comments on a Variety of Aspects of an Actor's Art and Life. Ed. and trans. Elizabeth Reynolds Hapgood. Revised and expanded edition. London: Methuen, 1981. ISBN 0-413-47770-3.
- Stanislavski, Constantin, and Pavel Rumyantsev. 1975. Stanislavski on Opera. Trans. Elizabeth Reynolds Hapgood. London: Routledge, 1998. ISBN 0-87830-552-1.
- Strasberg, Lee. 2010. The Lee Strasberg Notes. Ed. Lola Cohen. London: Routledge. ISBN 978-0-415-55186-1.
- Thomas, James. 2016. A Director's Guide to Stanislavsky's Active Analysis. London: Methuen. ISBN 978-1-4742-5659-9.
- Toporkov, Vasily Osipovich. 2001. Stanislavski in Rehearsal: The Final Years. Trans. Jean Benedetti. London: Methuen. ISBN 0-413-75720-X.
- Whyman, Rose. 2008. The Stanislavsky System of Acting: Legacy and Influence in Modern Performance. Cambridge: Cambridge University Press.

ISBN 978-0-521-88696-3.

- Worrall, Nick. 1996. The Moscow Art Theatre. Theatre Production Studies ser. London and NY: Routledge. ISBN 0-415-05598-9.
