= Marina Karaseva =

Russian musicologist

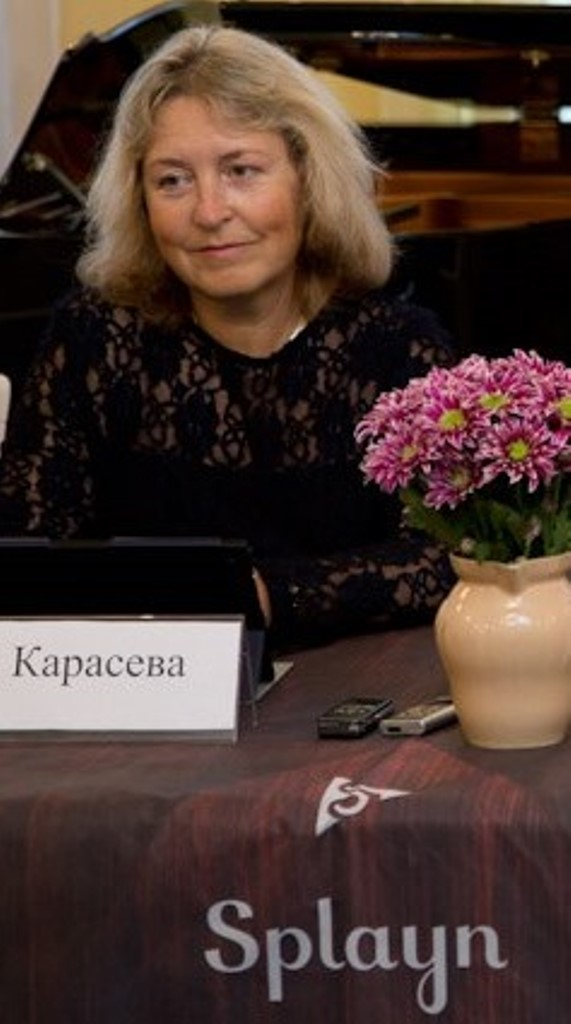
Marina Karaseva

Marina Valeryevna Karaseva (Russian: Марина Валериевна Карасёва; born 8 August 1958 in Moscow) is a Russian musicologist, Honoured Art Worker of the Russian Federation, Professor of Moscow Conservatory, Department of Music Theory, Grand Doctor in Art, Ph.D. in Musicology, Member of Russian Composers Union, Fulbright Scholar, Advisor to the Rector (since 2010).

== Pedagogical contribution ==
Karaseva is the author of a new approach to the modern ear training system. In the 1980s she created a complex methodological system of ear training using 20th century music. She has disclosed basic intonational patterns of modern post major-minor music (its melodics, new modal scales, chord system, rhythm, etc.) and has developed systematic ways for their study in ear-training courses - from music-school to conservatory level.

Karaseva's course combines the best features of the traditional Russian ear-training system with a new investigation into the area of modern harmony (particularly, her scientific teacher, Dr. Yuri Kholopov researches) as well as with a new psychological approach based on synesthetic listening training. This combination makes Karaseva's course an original one, unique in the world of contemporary music education.

The ear training system created by Karaseva allows students dealing with intonationally and rhythmically complicated music patterns of contemporary music to be able to clearly select by ear (not only by theoretical analysis) interrelationships between new modes, non-third chords, and new functional tonal system. This method improves sight-singing and listening of 20th century music.

Karaseva's course, "Modern solfeggio" in 3 Volumes (1st vol - music pattern selection and instructive exercises, 2nd - 20th century music examples, 3d Harmonical Solfeggio), was published in 1996. It is considered one of the most effective practical courses in ear training, and, worldwide, it is the first of its kind.

"Modern Solfeggio" has been approved for use throughout the Russian music educational system (colleges and conservatories) for more than 20 years. It has also been used abroad during Karaseva's seminars, master classes and conference papers in the US, Europe and Japan.

In 1999, Karaseva took up a Senior Fulbright Scholarship in the United States. Her Fulbright Program research project was entitled "Music Psychotechnology as a New Approach at the Cross-Roads of Sciences: Cognitive Musicology and Practical Psychology" (School of Music, University of Maryland, College Park, 1999–2000).

In the same year, she wrote a monograph, "Solfeggio - a Psychotechnique of Ear training" (371 pp.) where she explains the core of her methodology. This book became the first complex scientific investigation in the field of practical music cognition. Karaseva obtained a degree of Grand Doctor in Art (the highest academic degree in Russia) for this book in October 2000. A second edition was published in 2002. Her books and courses on Modern Solfeggio can be found in many libraries in the US, Europe, and Japan.

In 2005 she created a new course in music timbre dictations, which is published with a CD containing various natural and synthetic instrumental and vocal timbres.

The second area of Karaseva's innovative activities is the creation of interdisciplinary academic courses new to the Russian musical and academic system (in Russia music education is not part of the general university system). She has devised, and now delivers, an academic course on Social Psychology of Music for Moscow State University (Adjunct Professor of the MSU Department of Psychology, from 2001) and a course on "Music Sociology" at the Higher School of Economics (HSE) (Adjunct Professor of the Department of Sociology from 2006).

Karaseva's latest research is in the field of language learning. She is investigating the application of musical notation for the improvement of intonation in foreign-language study. She has written a course in the musical decoding of the intonation of Japanese and English speech. In 2006 her innovative interdisciplinary approach was approved at the Congress for Japanese Language Study in The Institute for Asian and African Studies affiliated with Moscow State University and at the International Congress of Asia TEFL Society in Fukuoka, Japan (her paper contribution was awarded by special TEFL grant).

== Professional biography ==
Karaseva undertook her basic professional music education at the Moscow Conservatory College (1973-1977), the Moscow Conservatory, Department of Music Theory and Composition (1977-1982) and then completed Postdoctoral-Fellowship study at the Moscow Conservatory (1982-1988).

The main subject of her undergraduate and doctoral research were contemporary systems of ear training around the world. This research was undertaken under the supervision of Yuri Kholopov. She completed an M.A. on: "Toward the Problem of Ear training and Sight Singing of the XX Century Music. The Systematization of Solfeggio Methods" (1982). Her Ph.D. thesis researched "The Theoretical Problems of the Modern Ear training" (1989).

In 1982 Karaseva became a teacher at the Central Music School of Moscow Conservatory (1982-1996, Music Theory, Harmony and Ear training) and a professor at the Moscow Conservatory (Department of Music Theory, from 1982 to present time, from 2002 - Full Professor position).

In 2004 she began studying Japanese and investigating methodological investigations on the problem of Japanese intonation and its music notation (at The Japan Embassy Cultural Center in Moscow). In 2005 and 2006 she obtained the JLPT Certificate (4th and 3rd level) from the Japan Foundation.

Dr. Karaseva participates in international musicological and interdisciplinary conferences in Russia, Europe, America, and Japan. She is the author of more than 50 books, manuals and methodological papers on music (music theory, ear training) and language education, music psychology and cultural policy.

== Selected publications ==
=== Selected books and methodological programs ===
- Japanese Solfeggio. Art of Melodic Intonation. 444 Exercises in Japanese Phrases Intoning. In Two Parts. Moscow:Kompozitor, 2008.
- Music in Two Voices. Etudes for Singing, Playing, and Music Dictations. Sound Timbre Dictations. Moscow: "Kompozitor" Publishing House, 2005.ISBN 5-85285-704-1.
- Methodological Programs in Ear training for majors in Musicology, Composition, and Choral conducting. Moscow: UMO, 2005.
- Program in Ear training methodology for conservatory majors in Musicology and Music theory. Moscow: UMO, 2001.
- Solfeggio — a Psychotechnique of Ear training. Moscow: Konservatoriya, 1999, ISBN 5-89598-065-1 OCLC 47012945; 2nd edition: Moscow: "Kompozitor" Publishing House, 2002, OCLC 53797074; 3rd edition: Moscow: Kompozitor, 2009. ISBN 5-85285-332-1, OCLC 609814537.
- Course of Modern Solfeggio: In 3 Volumes. Moscow: "Sovetskii Kompozitor" Publishing House, 1996. ISBN 5-86419-028-4 .
- Elementary Music Theory and Harmony: Express Course. Moscow: Konservatoriya, 1994. ISBN 5-86419-010-1.

=== Selected articles ===
- Sots Art starts and wins. "Kultura" Weekly Newspaper, No.41 (7602) Sept.18 - 24, 2007. P. 4.
- Solfeggio-21: between dreams and pragmatics. How to teach solfeggio in 21st century. Moscow: Klassika-21, P. 3–10. ISBN 5-89817-166-5.
- Power of music in music of power. Music and musician in the changing social-cultural area. Rostov on Don, 2005. P. 153–163. ISBN 5-7509-0275-7.
- Contemporary good ear for music and the new millennium challenges. Music and musician in the changing social-cultural area. Rostov on Don, 2005. P. 72–86. ISBN 5-7509-0275-7.
- Humanitarian and creative education in Russia and un the U.S. The Proceedings of the International Conference "Russian-American Interrelations in the Context of Globalization". Moscow, 2005. P. 73–80. ISBN 5-901745-07-8.
- The mystery of the 20th century music aversion: synesthetical associations as a psychological key factor of listener’s aural barriers. Horror Novitatis. Prague, 2005. P. 88-91 (in English). ISBN 80-86791-19-X.
- Learning Japanese melodically: language ear training methodology by means of music notation. Globalization and National Originality. Forum of Languages. Kazan, "Ekotsentr", 2004. P. 207–212.
- Steps in the snow: Meta-programs of the new Russian culture and their application in the field of music marketing. Professionals for Cooperation, Issue 6. Moscow, 2004. P. 197–228. ISBN 5-89655-021-9.
- Social psychocorrection by means of music. Musicology and Globalization: proceedings of the international congress in Shizuoka 2002: in celebration of the 50th anniversary of the Musicological Society of Japan / edited by the Musicological Society of Japan = Ongakugaku to gurobarizeshon: Nippon Ongaku Gakkai soritsu 50-shunen kinen kokusai taikai Shizuoka 2002 hokokusho / Nippon Ongaku Gakkai hen. 2004. P. 517-519 (in English).
- Russian solfeggio in postmodernism: or postmodernism in the mirror of methodology. Yuri Kholopov and his Scientific School. Moscow, 2003. P. 333–339. ISBN 5-89598-136-4.
- Diplomacy with the language of music: National anthem as a genre of multicultural communication. Professionals for Cooperation, Issue 5. Moscow, 2002. P. 196–206. ISBN 5-7913-0052-2.
- Gregory Voronov — Marina Karaseva: Strategies of the music creation. Music Academy. N 1. 2002. P. 39–49. ISSN 0869-4516.
- Musical ear in context of modern practical psychology. Music Academy. N 4. 1999. P. 172–185. ISSN 0869-4516.
- NLP and music therapy through the musician's look. NLP Revue. Modern Practical Psychology. N 1. Moscow, 1999. P. 125–153. ISBN 5-89692-018-0.
- Solfeggio — psychotechnique of modern professional ear training. Improvement of Musical Ear. N 4. Moscow, 1999. P. 67–85. ISBN 5-89598-043-0.
- What should be Modern Solfeggio? Laudamus. Moscow, 1992. P. 273–280. ISBN 5-85285-424-7.
