= Given circumstances =

Stanislavsky's System

The term given circumstances is a principle from Konstantin Stanislavski's methodology for actor training, formulated in the first half of the 20th century at the Moscow Art Theatre.

The term given circumstances is applied to the total set of environmental and situational conditions which influence the actions that a character in a drama undertakes. Although a character may make such choices unconsciously, the actor playing the character is aware of such conditions on a conscious level to help him or her deepen his or her understanding of the motivation behind the character's actions. Given circumstances include conditions of the character's world (e.g. specifics of time and place: in Hamlet for instance, being in Elsinore at a specific time in history is a given circumstance), elements from the history of the character's environment (e.g. Hamlet: the death of the old King Hamlet preceding the play's plot is a given circumstance), and elements from the character's personal situation (e.g. Hamlet: the character Hamlet is a crown prince).

In his own writing on his theatre practice, Stanislavski describes given circumstances as "The plot, the facts, the incidents, the period, the time and place of the action, the way of life. [...] The Given Circumstances, just like "if", are suppositions, "products of the imagination."
