= Psychotechnique =

Psychotechnique (A portmanteau of psychological technique) forms part of the 'system' of actor training, preparation, and rehearsal developed by the Russian theatre practitioner Konstantin Stanislavski. It describes the inner, psychological elements of training that support what he called "experiencing" a role in performance. In a rehearsal process, psychotechnique is interrelated with the "embodiment" of the role, in order to achieve a fully realised characterisation. Stanislavski describes the elements of psychotechnique in the first part of his manual An Actor's Work.

== List ==
- Relaxation
- Concentration on an object
- The "As if" (Also called "What if" or "Magic ''if")
- Affective memory (Also called "Emotional memory", or divided by Maria Ouspenskaya teaching in Analytical memory and the Memory of real feeling)
