= Acting =

Activity

Acting is an activity in which a story is told by means of its enacting by an actor who adopts a character—in theatre, television, film, radio, or any other medium that makes use of the mimetic mode.

Acting involves a broad range of skills, including a well-developed imagination, emotional facility, physical expressivity, vocal projection, clarity of speech, and the ability to interpret drama. Acting also demands an ability to employ dialects, accents, improvisation, observation and emulation, mime, and stage combat. Many actors train at length in specialist programs or colleges to develop these skills. The vast majority of professional actors have gone through extensive training. Actors and actresses will often have many instructors and teachers for a full range of training involving singing, scene-work, audition techniques, and acting for camera.

Most early sources in the West that examine the art of acting (Ancient Greek: ὑποκριτής, hupokritḗs) discuss it as part of rhetoric.

== History ==
One of the first known actors was an ancient Greek called Thespis of Icaria in Athens. Writing two centuries after the event, Aristotle in his Poetics (c. 335 BCE) suggests that Thespis stepped out of the dithyrambic chorus and addressed it as a separate character. Before Thespis, the chorus narrated (for example, "Dionysus did this, Dionysus said"). When Thespis stepped out from the chorus, he spoke as if he were the character (for example, "I am Dionysus, I did this"). To distinguish between these different modes of storytelling—enactment and narration—Aristotle uses the terms "mimesis" (via enactment) and "diegesis" (via narration). From the Greek actor Thespis' name derives the word "thespian".

== Training ==
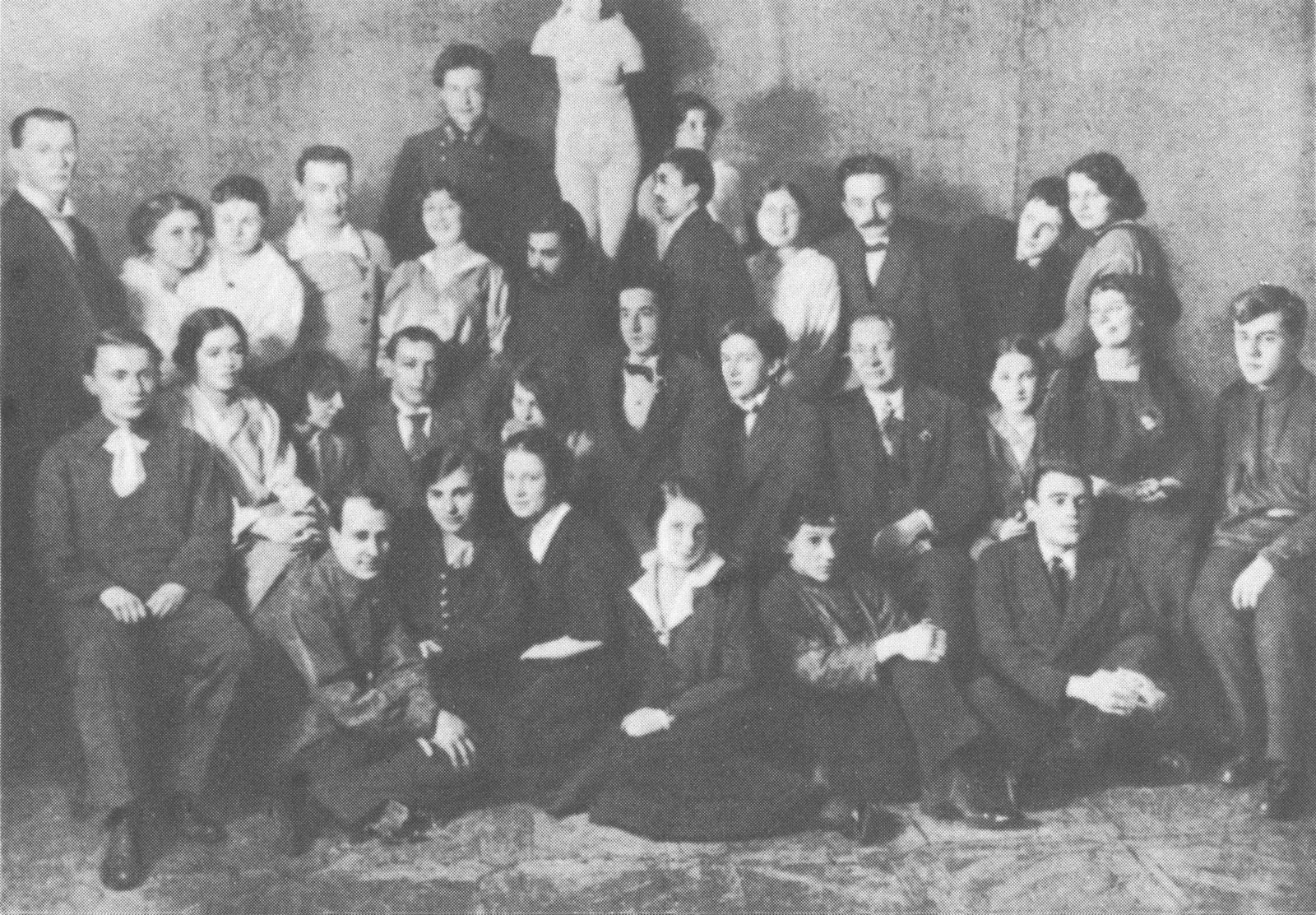
Members of the First Studio, with whom Stanislavski began to develop his 'system' of actor training, which forms the basis for most professional training in the West.

Conservatories and drama schools typically offer two- to four-year training on all aspects of acting. Universities mostly offer three- to four-year programs, in which a student is often able to choose to focus on acting, whilst continuing to learn about other aspects of theatre. Schools vary in their approach, but in North America the most popular method taught derives from the 'system' of Konstantin Stanislavski, which was developed and popularised in America as method acting by Lee Strasberg, Stella Adler, Sanford Meisner, and others.

Other approaches may include a more physically based orientation, such as that promoted by theatre practitioners as diverse as Anne Bogart, Jacques Lecoq, Jerzy Grotowski, or Vsevolod Meyerhold. Classes may also include psychotechnique, mask work, physical theatre, improvisation, and acting for camera.

Regardless of a school's approach, students should expect intensive training in textual interpretation, voice, and movement. Applications to drama programmes and conservatories usually involve extensive auditions. Anybody over the age of 18 can usually apply. Training may also start at a very young age. Acting classes and professional schools targeted at under-18s are widespread. These classes introduce young actors to different aspects of acting and theatre, including scene study.

Increased training and exposure to public speaking allows people to maintain a calmer and more relaxed physiology. Measuring a public speaker's heart rate is perhaps one of the easiest ways to assess changes in stress, as heart rate increases with anxiety. As actors increase their performances, heart rate and other signs of stress may decrease. This is very important in training actors, as adaptive strategies gained from increased exposure to public speaking can regulate implicit and explicit anxiety. By attending an institution that specializes in acting, the increased opportunity to act will lead to a more relaxed physiology and a decrease in stress and its effects on the body. These effects can range from hormonal to cognitive health that can impact quality of life and performance.

== Improvisation ==
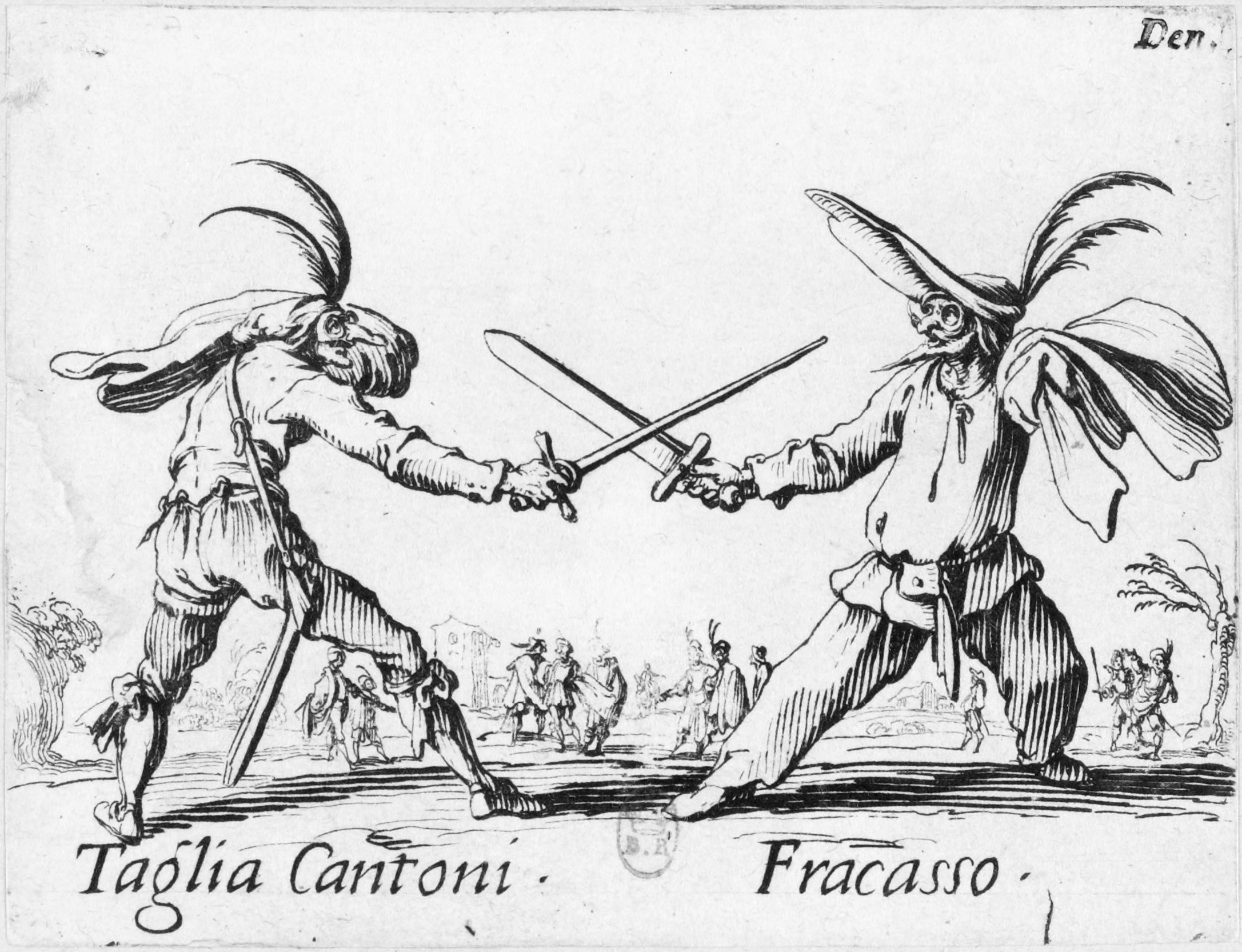
Two masked characters from the commedia dell'arte, whose "lazzi" involved a significant degree of improvisation.

Some classical forms of acting involve a substantial element of improvised performance. Most notable is its use by the troupes of the commedia dell'arte, a form of masked comedy that originated in Italy.

Improvisation as an approach to acting formed an important part of the Russian theatre practitioner Konstantin Stanislavski's 'system' of actor training, which he developed from the 1910s onwards. Late in 1910, the playwright Maxim Gorky invited Stanislavski to join him in Capri, where they discussed training and Stanislavski's emerging "grammar" of acting. Inspired by a popular theatre performance in Naples that utilised the techniques of the commedia dell'arte, Gorky suggested that they form a company, modelled on the medieval strolling players, in which a playwright and group of young actors would devise new plays together by means of improvisation. Stanislavski would develop this use of improvisation in his work with his First Studio of the Moscow Art Theatre. Stanislavski's use was extended further in the approaches to acting developed by his students, Michael Chekhov and Maria Knebel.

In the United Kingdom, the use of improvisation was pioneered by Joan Littlewood from the 1930s onwards and, later, by Keith Johnstone and Clive Barker. In the United States, it was promoted by Viola Spolin, after working with Neva Boyd at a Hull House in Chicago, Illinois (Spolin was Boyd's student from 1924 to 1927). Like the British practitioners, Spolin felt that playing games was a useful means of training actors and helped to improve an actor's performance. With improvisation, she argued, people may find expressive freedom, since they do not know how an improvised situation will turn out. Improvisation demands an open mind in order to maintain spontaneity, rather than pre-planning a response. A character is created by the actor, often without reference to a dramatic text, and a drama is developed out of the spontaneous interactions with other actors. This approach to creating new drama has been developed most substantially by the British filmmaker Mike Leigh, in films such as Secrets & Lies (1996), Vera Drake (2004), Another Year (2010), and Mr. Turner (2014).

Improvisation is also used to cover up if an actor or actress makes a mistake.

== Physiological effects ==
Acting in front of an audience many times can cause "stage fright", a form of stress in which someone becomes anxious in front of an audience. This is common among actors, especially new actors, and can cause symptoms such as increased heart rate, increased blood pressure, and sweating.

In a 2017 study on American university students, actors of various experience levels all showed similarly elevated heart rates throughout their performances; this agrees with previous studies on professional and amateur actors' heart rates. While all actors experienced stress, causing elevated heart rate, the more experienced actors displayed less heart rate variability than the less experienced actors in the same play. The more experienced actors experienced less stress while performing, and therefore had a smaller degree of variability than the less experienced, more stressed actors. The more experienced an actor is, the more stable their heart rate will be while performing, but will still experience elevated heart rates.

== Semiotics ==
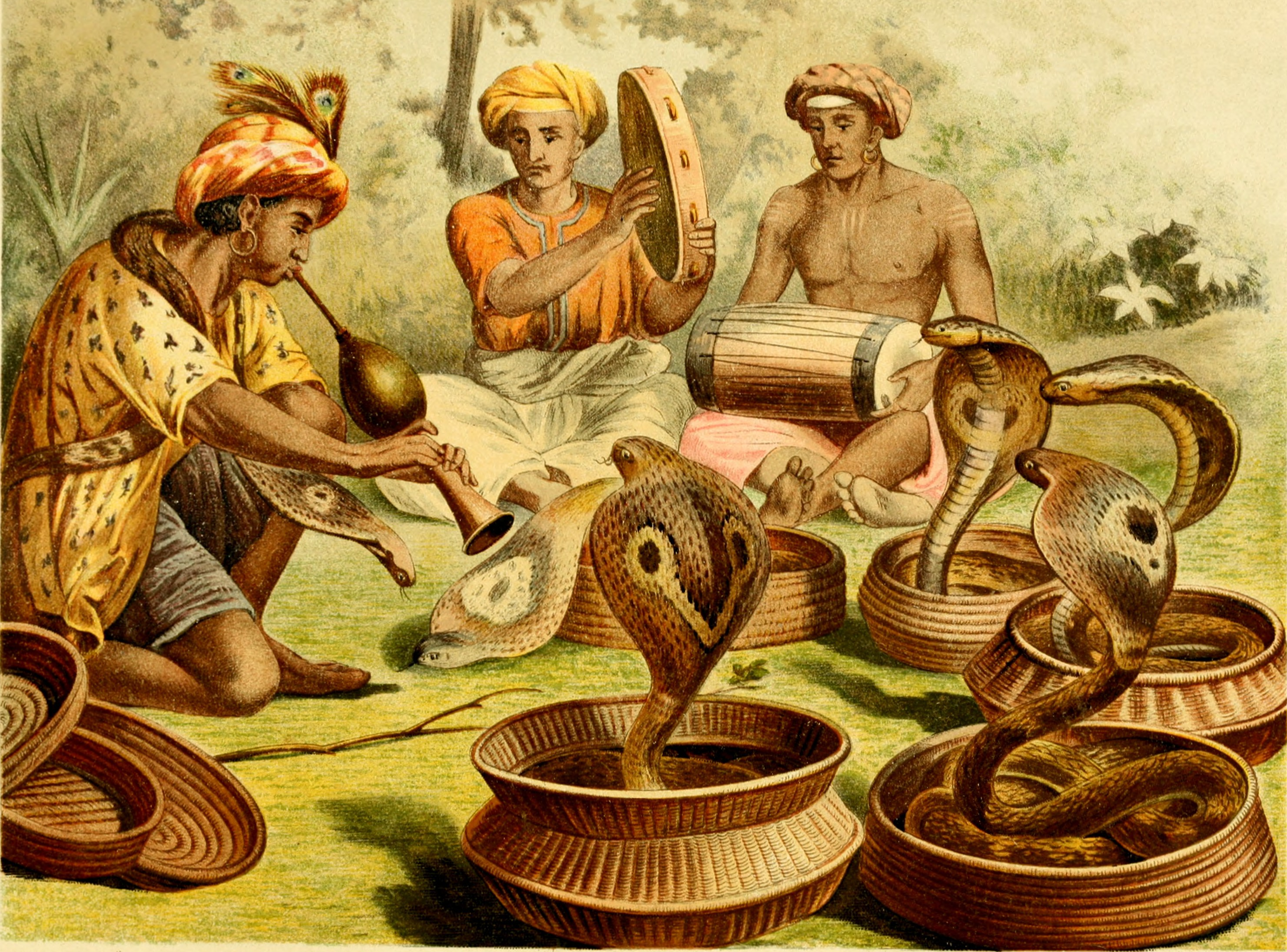
Antonin Artaud compared the effect of an actor's performance on an audience in his "Theatre of Cruelty" with the way in which a snake charmer affects snakes.

The semiotics of acting involves a study of the ways in which aspects of a performance come to operate for its audience as signs. This process largely involves the production of meaning, whereby elements of an actor's performance acquire significance, both within the broader context of the dramatic action and in the relations each establishes with the real world.

Film scholar Murray Pomerance notes that even children understand that the actors on screen are not actually the characters they are portraying and that the actors were getting paid to do this. Nevertheless, the audience accepts the false reality of what is being communicated on film. The audience is obligated to pretend that it is real for the scene to work. Nobody explains this obligation to the audience; the implicit obligation and the way in which to pretend appears to be innate.

Following the ideas proposed by the Surrealist theorist Antonin Artaud, however, it may also be possible to understand communication with an audience that occurs 'beneath' significance and meaning (which the semiotician Félix Guattari described as a process involving the transmission of "a-signifying signs"). In his The Theatre and its Double (1938), Artaud compared this interaction to the way in which a snake charmer communicates with a snake, a process which he identified as "mimesis"—the same term that Aristotle in his Poetics (c. 335 BCE) used to describe the mode in which drama communicates its story, by virtue of its embodiment by the actor enacting it, as distinct from "diegesis", or the way in which a narrator may describe it. These "vibrations" passing from the actor to the audience may not necessarily precipitate into significant elements as such (that is, consciously perceived "meanings"), but rather may operate by means of the circulation of "affects".

The approach to acting adopted by other theatre practitioners involve varying degrees of concern with the semiotics of acting. Konstantin Stanislavski, for example, addresses the ways in which an actor, building on what he calls the "experiencing" of a role, should also shape and adjust a performance in order to support the overall significance of the drama—a process that he calls establishing the "perspective of the role". The semiotics of acting plays a far more central role in Bertolt Brecht's epic theatre, in which an actor is concerned to bring out clearly the socio historical significance of behaviour and action by means of specific performance choices—a process that he describes as establishing the "not/but" element in a performed physical gestus within context of the play's overall fabel. Eugenio Barba argues that actors ought not to concern themselves with the significance of their performance behaviour; this aspect is the responsibility, he claims, of the director, who weaves the signifying elements of an actor's performance into the director's dramaturgical "montage".

The theatre semiotician Patrice Pavis, alluding to the contrast between Stanislavski's 'system' and Brecht's demonstrating performer—and, beyond that, to Denis Diderot's foundational essay on the art of acting, Paradox of the Actor (c. 1770–78)—argues that:

Acting was long seen in terms of the actor's sincerity or hypocrisy—should he believe in what he is saying and be moved by it, or should he distance himself and convey his role in a detached manner? The answer varies according to how one sees the effect to be produced in the audience and the social function of theatre.

Elements of a semiotics of acting include the actor's gestures, facial expressions, intonation and other vocal qualities, rhythm, and the ways in which these aspects of an individual performance relate to the drama and the theatrical event (or film, television programme, or radio broadcast, each of which involves different semiotic systems) considered as a whole. A semiotics of acting recognises that all forms of acting involve conventions and codes by means of which performance behaviour acquires significance—including those approaches, such as Stanislvaski's or the closely related method acting developed in the United States, that offer themselves as "a natural kind of acting that can do without conventions and be received as self-evident and universal." Pavis goes on to argue that:

Any acting is based on a codified system (even if the audience does not see it as such) of behaviour and actions that are considered to be believable and realistic or artificial and theatrical. To advocate the natural, the spontaneous, and the instinctive is only to attempt to produce natural effects, governed by an ideological code that determines, at a particular historical time, and for a given audience, what is natural and believable and what is declamatory and theatrical.

The conventions that govern acting in general are related to structured forms of play, which involve, in each specific experience, "rules of the game." This aspect was first explored by Johan Huizinga (in Homo Ludens, 1938) and Roger Caillois (in Man, Play and Games, 1958). Caillois, for example, distinguishes four aspects of play relevant to acting: mimesis (simulation), agon (conflict or competition), alea (chance), and ilinx (vertigo, or "vertiginous psychological situations" involving the spectator's identification or catharsis). This connection with play as an activity was first proposed by Aristotle in his Poetics, in which he defines the desire to imitate in play as an essential part of being human and our first means of learning as children:

For it is an instinct of human beings, from childhood, to engage in mimesis (indeed, this distinguishes them from other animals: man is the most mimetic of all, and it is through mimesis that he develops his earliest understanding); and equally natural that everyone enjoys mimetic objects. (IV, 1448b)

This connection with play also informed the words used in English (as was the analogous case in many other European languages) for drama: the word "play" or "game" (translating the Anglo-Saxon plèga or Latin ludus) was the standard term used until William Shakespeare's time for a dramatic entertainment—just as its creator was a "play-maker" rather than a "dramatist", the person acting was known as a "player", and, when in the Elizabethan era specific buildings for acting were built, they were known as "play-houses" rather than "theatres."

== Resumes and auditions ==
Actors and actresses need to make a resume when applying for roles. The acting resume is very different from a normal resume; it is generally shorter, with lists instead of paragraphs, and it should have a head shot on the back. Sometimes, a resume also contains a short 30-second to 1-minute reel displaying the actor's abilities, so that the casting director can see previous performances, if any. An actor's resume should list projects they have acted in before, such as plays, movies, or shows, as well as special skills and their contact information.

Auditioning is the act of performing either a monologue or sides (lines for one character) as sent by the casting director. Auditioning entails showing the actor's skills to present themselves as a different person; it may be as brief as two minutes. For theater auditions it can be longer than two minutes, or they may perform more than one monologue, as each casting director can have different requirements for actors. Actors should go to auditions dressed for the part, to make it easier for the casting director to visualize them as the character. For television or film they will have to undergo more than one audition. Oftentimes actors are called into another audition at the last minute, and are sent the sides either that morning or the night before. Auditioning can be a stressful part of acting, especially if one has not been trained to audition.

== Rehearsal ==
Rehearsal is a process in which actors prepare and practice a performance together with directors and technical staff. Some actors continue to rehearse a scene throughout the run of a show in order to keep the scene fresh in their minds and exciting for the audience.

== Audience ==
A critical audience with evaluative spectators is known to induce stress on actors during performance. While public performances cause extremely high stress levels in actors (more so amateur ones), the stress actually improves the performance, supporting the idea of "positive stress in challenging situations."

== Heart rate ==
Depending on what an actor is doing, their heart rate will vary. This is the body's way of responding to stress. Prior to a show, one will see an increase in heart rate due to anxiety. While performing an actor has an increased sense of exposure which will increase performance anxiety and the associated physiological arousal, such as heart rate. Heart rates increases more during shows compared to rehearsals because of the increased pressure, which is because a performance has a potentially greater impact on an actor's career. After the show a decrease in the heart rate due to the conclusion of the stress inducing activity can be seen. Often the heart rate will return to normal after the show or performance is done; however, during the applause after the performance there is a rapid spike in heart rate. This can be seen not only in actors but also with public speaking and musicians.

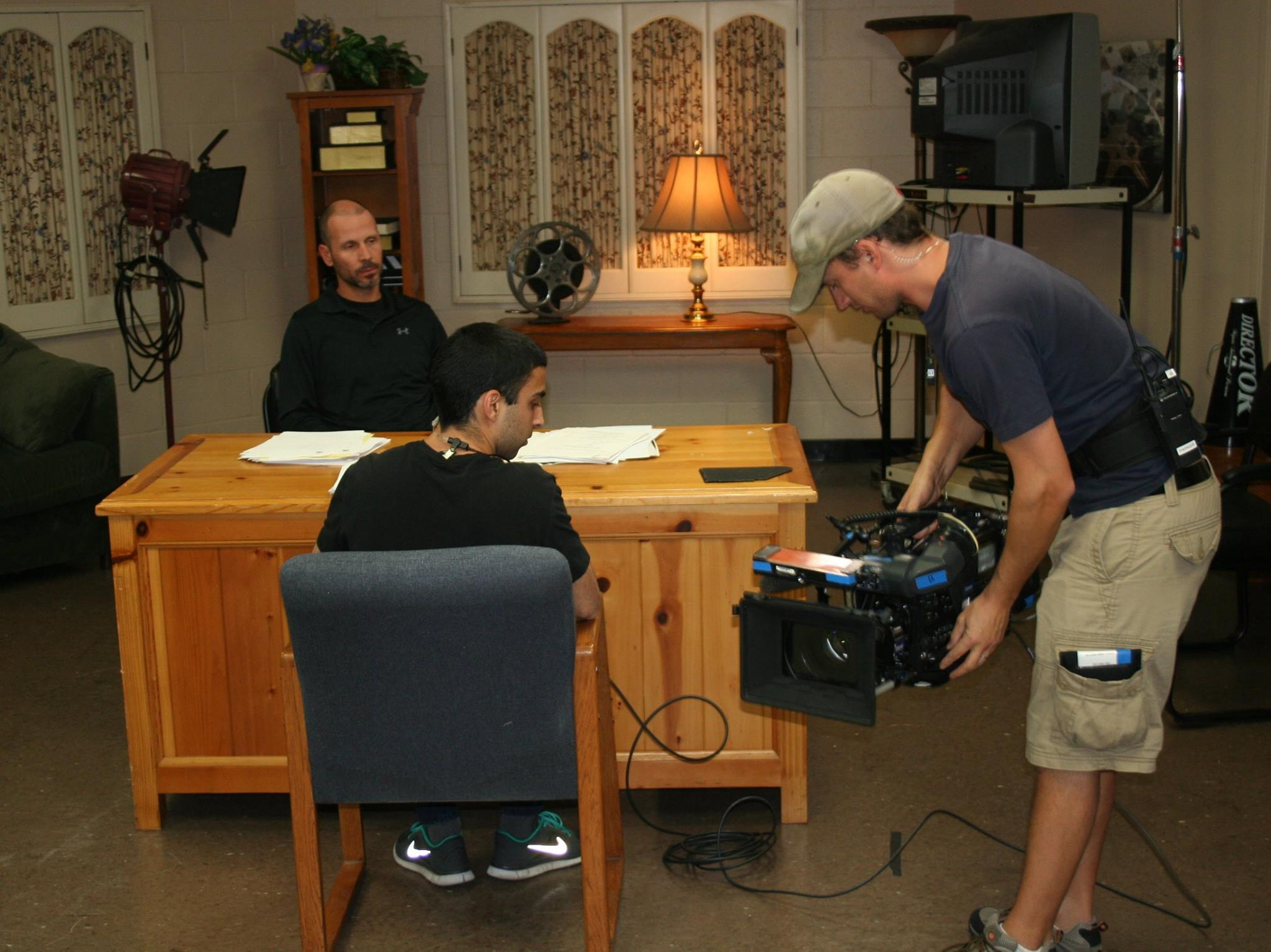
Inside a look of The Actors Workshop shows on what an actor is doing, their heart rate will vary.

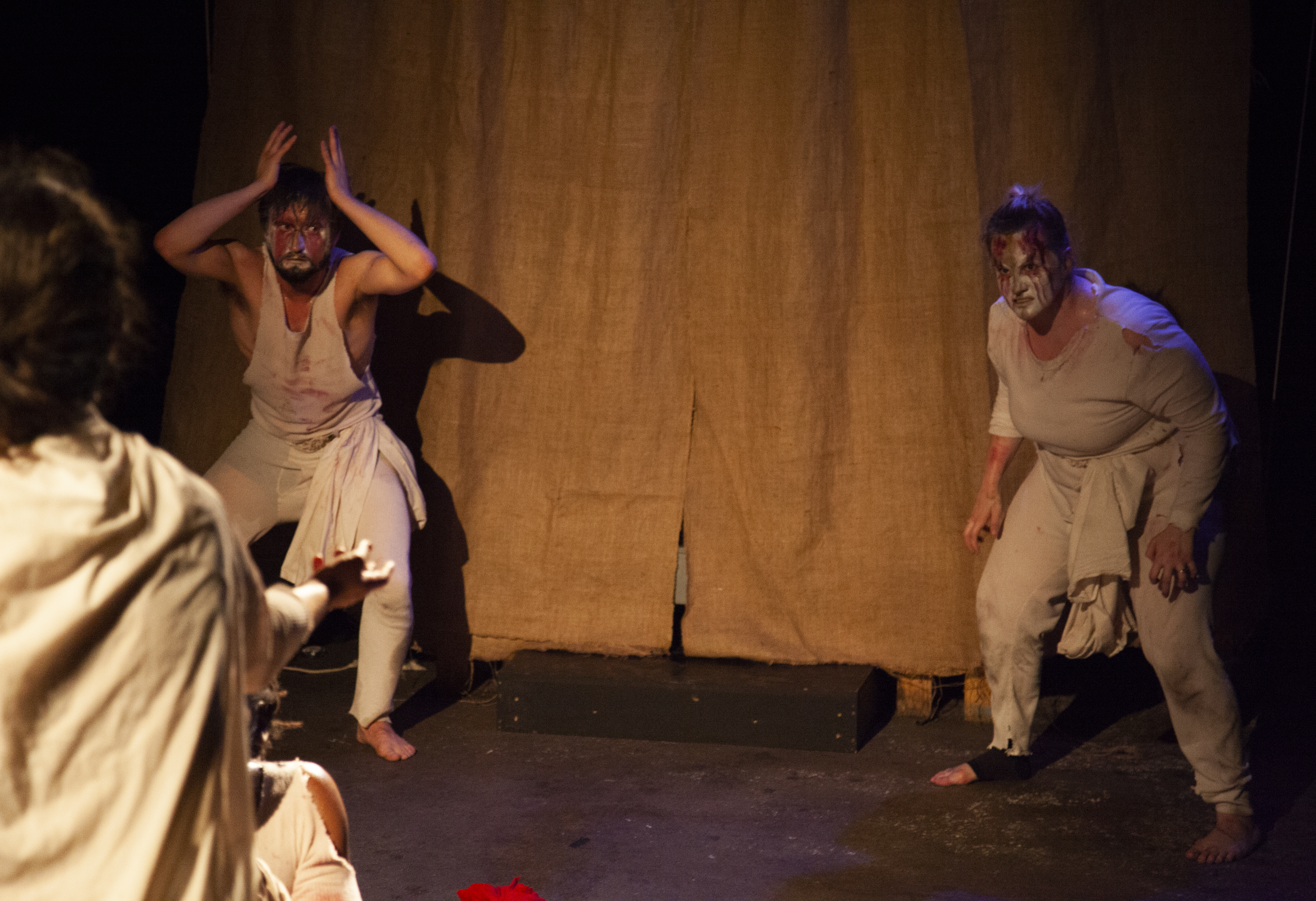
Sam Gibbs and Su Thomas Hendrickson in Oresteia by Aeschylus, adapted by Ryan Castalia for Stairwell Theater, 2019

There is a correlation between heart-rate and stress when actors' are performing in front of an audience. Actors claim that having an audience has no change in their stress level, but as soon as they come on stage their heart-rate rises quickly before they speak their first lines. A 2017 study measuring actors' heart-rate during performance showed that individual heart-rates rose right before the performance began. Length of monologues, experience levels, and actions done on stage were important factors in the study. Heart-rate drops significantly at the end of a monologue, big action scene, or performance.

Acting has been shown to be an effective tool for reducing stress created by social anxiety.

== See also ==
- Biomechanics
- Meisner technique
- Method acting
- Presentational and representational acting
- Stanislavski's system
- Viewpoints
- Lists of actors
- Flopping (basketball)
