= Fabel =

Critical term and dramaturgical technique

A fabel [ˈfaː.bl̩] is a critical analysis of the plot of a play. It is a dramaturgical technique that was pioneered by Bertolt Brecht, a 20th century German theatre practitioner.

Fabel should not be confused with fable, which is a form of short narrative (hence the retention of the original German spelling in its adoption into English usage). Elizabeth Wright argues that it is "a term of art which cannot be adequately translated".

== A critical term ==
As a critical term, a fabel includes three interrelated but distinct aspects: firstly, an analysis of the events portrayed in the story. In an epic production, this analysis would focus on the social interactions between the characters and the causality of their behaviour from a historical materialist perspective; the fabel summarizes "the moral of the story not in a merely ethical sense, but also in a socio-political one". For example, in relation to Brecht's play Man Equals Man (1926), Wright argues that "[t]he fabel of this play centres on the transformation of an individual through his insertion into a collective."

Secondly, a fabel analyzes the plot from a formal and semiotic perspective. This includes the play's dramatic structure and its formal shaping of the events portrayed. It also includes an analysis of the semiotic fabric of the play, recognizing that it "does not simply correspond to actual events in the collective life of human beings, but consists of invented happenings [and that t]he stage figures are not simple representations of living persons, but invented and shaped in response to ideas."

Thirdly, a fabel analyzes the attitudes that the play appears to embody and articulate (in the sense of the author's, the characters' and, eventually, the company's). Brecht refers to this aspect of a play as its Gestus. Analyzing a play in this way presupposes Brecht's recognition that every play encodes such attitudes; "for art to be 'unpolitical'", he argued in his "Short Organum for the Theatre" (1949), "means only to ally itself with the 'ruling' group".

== A practical tool ==
As a practical tool, fabels form part of the process of engaging with a play-text undertaken by a company when mounting a production of a play. A fabel is a piece of creative writing, usually made by a dramaturg or the director, that summarizes the plot of a play in such a way as to emphasize the production's interpretation of that play-text. It is produced in order to make clear the company's particular way of understanding and rendering the story. In this respect, it is related to the concept of Gestus (insofar as this renders an action and an attitude towards that action simultaneously); a fabel indicates the sequence of gestic episodes that constitute the dramatic or theatrical narrative.

Carl Weber, who worked as a director with Brecht at his Berliner Ensemble, explains that:

"[w]hat he [Brecht] called fabel was the plot of the play told as a sequence of interactions, describing each event in the dialectic fashion developed by Hegel, Marx and, in Brecht’s last years, also by Mao. This may sound quite theoretical, but in Brecht’s practice the fabel was something utterly concrete and practical. Acting, music, the visual elements of the staging, in short, everything an audience perceived, had to contribute to the storytelling and make it lucid, convincing, entertaining and ‘elegant’--as Brecht liked to put it. One result was that the Ensemble’s productions were quite well understood by international audiences who could not follow the German text. Brecht insisted that the configuration and movement of actors and objects on stage should clearly ‘tell the fabel’. If they were to watch a play through a glass wall blocking all sound, the audience should still be able to follow the essential story. He also insisted that each of the performance elements: acting, design, music and so forth, should remain a recognisable separate entity while it contributed to the fabel’s presentation. Brecht liked to speak of a 'storytelling arrangement', which meant the specific blocking of actors and all props employed in a scene. He regarded this arrangement as the most important means to achieve a clear presentation of the fabel, and the term 'scenic writing' may best convey what he was aiming for. [. . .] The thorough and extremely detailed preparation included countless discussions in which a text was dissected to determine which fabel it might yield."

As Weber's reference here to 'scenic writing' suggests, a director or other company member may produce multiple fabels during the course of a production, each detailing and clarifying a different aspect of the process: a dramatic analysis; an interpretive proposal; an initial springboard position from which to initiate a process of exploration and experiment in rehearsals; a description of individual production aspects (the lighting fabel, the sound Fabel, the visual or scenic design fabel, etc.); an account of progress made at different stages of the rehearsal process; individual actor performance and character behaviour fabels. Virtually any aspect of the theatrical process of production may be explored through the use of a specific fabel.

John Willett, Brecht's English translator, suggests that:

"[t]he primary principle which [Brecht] taught his collaborators was that of the fabel or story. The chain of events must be clearly and strongly established not just in the production, but beforehand in the actual play. Where it was not clear it was up to the ‘Dramaturg’ to alter the text, in order to cut unnecessary entanglements and come to the point. The play itself might be by Farquhar or Gerhart Hauptmann, Lenz or Molière, but ‘the writer’s words are only sacred insofar as they are true’. This went for Brecht’s own words as well, and his plays were subject to continual small changes even in the course of a single run. Atmosphere and ‘psychology’ did not matter as such; everything would emerge given a clear and credible sequence of concrete events. ‘Each scene,’ says a writer in Theaterarbeit,

is subdivided into a succession of episodes. Brecht produces as though each of these little episodes could be taken out of the play and performed on its own. They are meticulously realized, down to the smallest detail.

The chain of events had become his substitute for the tidy, comprehensive ‘plot’. Thus the "Short Organum":

As we cannot invite the public to fling itself into the story as if it were a river, and let itself be swept vaguely to and fro, the individual events have to be knotted together in such a way that the knots are easily seen. The events must not succeed one another indistinguishably but must give us a chance to interpose our judgment.

‘Playing according to the sense’, the Ensemble calls it; and the sense is what Brecht tried to get clear in any play, first for himself and his collaborators, then for the audience too.Hence, for example, his emphasis on that side of Shakespeare’s work which is so often neglected: the actual story. ‘It is a long time,’ he found, ‘since our theatre played these scenes for the events contained in them; they are played only for the outbursts of temperament which the events allow.’ [. . . ]

In such conferences Brecht would get his colleagues to make a written or verbal précis of the play, and later they would have to write descriptions of an actual performance. Both were practice in distilling the incidents that count.

A fabel specifies, narrativizes, and objectifies the attitudes and activities involved in the process of producing a play. In doing so, it enables company members to dialecticize that process—in the sense that a particular fabel provides a fixed 'snapshot' of a transitory and constantly developing process in a form that enables comparisons to be made. These comparisons may be between the description in the Fabel and the reality of the production as it stands or between different fabels (which have been generated by the production either at different stages of the process or in relation to different aspects—lighting, sound, blocking, etc.---of it); for example, having produced a Fabel at the beginning of the rehearsal process, the director may return to it near the end of rehearsals to check that the production is 'telling the story' intended (or, alternatively, to clarify the ways in which that story has changed as a result of rehearsal exploration and development).

The use of fabels does not predetermine the style of production nor does it necessarily require an epic dramaturgy or aesthetic (the elimination of suspense and mystery, defamiliarization effects, etc.), despite having originated in Brechtian practice. The creation of fabels is an attempt to achieve clarity for the producers (actors, director, designers) rather than the audience (which would characterize an epic production). One may create psychological (in a Stanislavskian approach) or metaphysical (in an Artaudian approach) fabels as well as the social ones that Brecht explored.

== See also ==
- Dramaturge
