= Defamiliarization =

Artistic technique

Defamiliarization or ostranenie (Russian: остранение, IPA: [ɐstrɐˈnʲenʲɪjə]) is the artistic technique of presenting to audiences common or ordinary things in an unfamiliar or strange way so they can gain new perspectives. According to the Russian formalists who coined the term, it is the central concept of art and poetry. The concept has influenced 20th-century art and theory, ranging over movements including Dadaism, postmodernism, epic theatre, science fiction, and philosophy. Additionally, it is used as a tactic by certain recent protest movements such as culture jamming.

== Coinage ==
The term "defamiliarization" was first used in 1917 by Russian formalist Viktor Shklovsky in his essay "Art as Device" (alternate translation: "Art as Technique"). Shklovsky invented the term as a means to "distinguish poetic from practical language on the basis of the former's perceptibility." Essentially, he stated that poetic language is fundamentally different than the language that we use every day because it is more difficult to understand: "Poetic speech is formed speech. Prose is ordinary speech – economical, easy, proper, the goddess of prose [dea prosae] is a goddess of the accurate, facile type, of the 'direct' expression of a child." This difference is the key to the creation of art and the prevention of "over-automatization," which would cause an individual to "function as though by formula."

This distinction between artistic language and everyday language, for Shklovsky, applies to all artistic forms:

The purpose of art is to impart the sensation of things as they are perceived and not as they are known. The technique of art is to make objects 'unfamiliar', to make forms difficult, to increase the difficulty and length of perception because the process of perception is an aesthetic end in itself and must be prolonged.

Thus, defamiliarization serves as a way to force individuals to recognize artistic language:

In studying poetic speech in its phonetic and lexical structure as well as in its characteristic distribution of words and in the characteristic thought structures compounded from the words, we find everywhere the artistic trademark – that is, we find material obviously created to remove the automatism of perception; the author's purpose is to create the vision which results from that deautomatized perception. A work is created "artistically" so that its perception is impeded and the greatest possible effect is produced through the slowness of the perception.

This technique is meant to be especially useful in distinguishing poetry from prose, for, as Aristotle said, "poetic language must appear strange and wonderful."

As writer Anaïs Nin discussed in her 1968 book The Novel of the Future:

It is the function of art to renew our perception. What we are familiar with we cease to see. The writer shakes up the familiar scene, and as if by magic, we see a new meaning in it.

Furthermore, according to literary theorist Uri Margolin:

Defamiliarization of that which is or has become familiar or taken for granted, hence automatically perceived, is the basic function of all devices. And with defamiliarization come both the slowing down and the increased difficulty (impeding) of the process of reading and comprehending and an awareness of the artistic procedures (devices) causing them.

== Usage ==
=== In Romantic poetry ===
The technique appears in English Romantic poetry, particularly in the poetry of Wordsworth, and was defined in the following way by Samuel Taylor Coleridge in his Biographia Literaria: "To carry on the feelings of childhood into the powers of manhood; to combine the child's sense of wonder and novelty with the appearances which every day for perhaps forty years had rendered familiar ... this is the character and privilege of genius."

Preceding Coleridge's formulation is that of the German Romantic poet and philosopher Novalis: "The art of estranging in a given way, making a subject strange and yet familiar and alluring, that is Romantic poetics."

=== In Russian literature ===
To illustrate what he means by defamiliarization, Shklovsky uses examples from Tolstoy, whom he cites as using the technique throughout his works: "The narrator of 'Kholstomer,' for example, is a horse, and it is the horse's point of view (rather than a person's) that makes the content of the story seem unfamiliar." As a Russian Formalist, many of Shklovsky's examples use Russian authors and Russian dialects: "And currently Maxim Gorky is changing his diction from the old literary language to the new literary colloquialism of Leskov. Ordinary speech and literary language have thereby changed places (see the work of Vyacheslav Ivanov and many others)."

Defamiliarization also includes the use of foreign languages within a work. At the time that Shklovsky was writing, there was a change in the use of language in both literature and everyday spoken Russian. As Shklovsky puts it: "Russian literary language, which was originally foreign to Russia, has so permeated the language of the people that it has blended with their conversation. On the other hand, literature has now begun to show a tendency towards the use of dialects and/or barbarisms."

Narrative plots can also be defamiliarized. The Russian formalists distinguished between the fabula or basic story stuff of a narrative and the syuzhet or the formation of the story stuff into a concrete plot. For Shklovsky, the syuzhet is the fabula defamiliarized. Shklovsky cites Laurence Sterne's Tristram Shandy as an example of a story that is defamiliarized by unfamiliar plotting. Sterne uses temporal displacements, digressions, and causal disruptions (e.g., placing the effects before their causes) to slow down the reader's ability to reassemble the (familiar) story. As a result, the syuzhet "makes strange" the fabula.

== Related concepts ==
=== Différance ===
Shklovsky's defamiliarization can also be compared to Jacques Derrida's concept of différance:

What Shklovskij wants to show is that the operation of defamiliarization and its consequent perception in the literary system is like the winding of a watch (the introduction of energy into a physical system): both "originate" difference, change, value, motion, presence. Considered against the general and functional background of Derridian différance, what Shklovsky calls "perception" can be considered a matrix for production of difference.

Since the term différance refers to the dual meanings of the French word difference to mean both "to differ" and "to defer", defamiliarization draws attention to the use of common language in such a way as to alter one's perception of an easily understandable object or concept. The use of defamiliarization both differs and defers, since the use of the technique alters one's perception of a concept (to defer), and forces one to think about the concept in different, often more complex, terms (to differ).

Shklovskij's formulations negate or cancel out the existence/possibility of a "real" perception: variously, by (1) the familiar Formalist denial of a link between literature and life, connoting their status as non-communicating vessels, (2) always, as if compulsively, referring to a real experience in terms of empty, dead, and automatized repetition and recognition, and (3) implicitly locating real perception at an unspecifiable temporally anterior and spatially other place, at a mythic "first time" of naïve experience, the loss of which to automatization is to be restored by aesthetic perceptual fullness.

=== The Uncanny ===
The influence of Russian Formalism on twentieth-century art and culture is largely due to the literary technique of defamiliarization or 'making strange', and has also been linked to Freud's notion of the uncanny. In Das Unheimliche ("The Uncanny"), Freud states that "the uncanny is that class of the frightening which leads back to what is known of old and long familiar," however, this is not a fear of the unknown, but more of a feeling about something being both strange and familiar. The connection between ostranenie and the uncanny can be seen where Freud muses on the technique of literary uncanniness: "It is true that the writer creates a kind of uncertainty in us in the beginning by not letting us know, no doubt purposely, whether he is taking us into the real world or into a purely fantastic one of his own creation." When "the writer pretends to move in the world of common reality," they can situate supernatural events, such as the animation of inanimate objects, in the quotidian, day-to-day reality of the modern world, defamiliarizing the reader and provoking an uncanny feeling.

=== The Estrangement effect ===
Defamiliarization has been associated with the poet and playwright Bertolt Brecht, whose Verfremdungseffekt ("estrangement effect") was a potent element of his approach to theatre. In fact, as Willett points out, Verfremdungseffekt is "a translation of the Russian critic Viktor Shklovskij's phrase 'Priem Ostranenija', or 'device for making strange'". Brecht, in turn, has been highly influential for artists and film-makers including Jean-Luc Godard and Yvonne Rainer.

Science fiction critic Simon Spiegel, who defines defamiliarization as "the formal-rhetorical act of making the familiar strange (in Shklovsky's sense)," distinguished it from Brecht's estrangement effect. To Spiegel, estrangement is the effect on the reader which can be caused by defamiliarization or through deliberate recontextualization of the familiar.

== See also ==
- Distancing effect
- Problematization
- Nacirema
- Mooreeffoc
- Jamais vu
