= Mahagonny-Songspiel =

Opera music by Kurt Weill text by Bertolt Brecht

- Scenic cantata by Kurt Weill
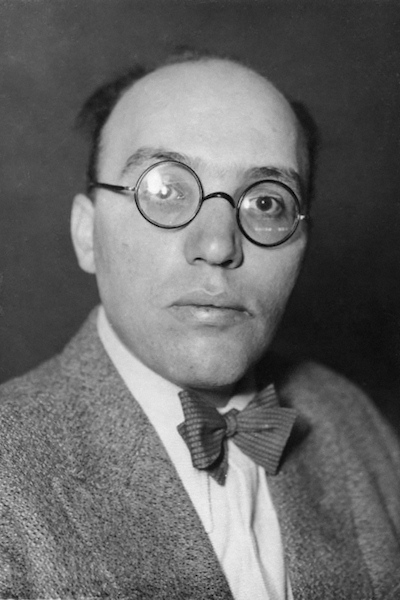
- The composer in 1932
- Translation: The Little Mahagonny
- Librettist: Bertolt Brecht
- Language: German, English
- Premiere: 17 July 1927; Chamber music festival, Baden-Baden

Mahagonny, ein Songspiel, or Mahagonny, a song-play, was written by composer Kurt Weill and dramatist Bertolt Brecht and first performed with that title and description in 1927. Elisabeth Hauptmann contributed the words to two of its songs. Just under half an hour in length, the work can be thought of as a staged or scenic cantata. By the end of 1929, however, Mahagonny had grown into a two-hour opera with the title Aufstieg und Fall der Stadt Mahagonny, or Rise and Fall of the City of Mahagonny. This was premiered in March 1930. Today the cantata and the opera are considered separately, the latter holding a place in the repertory, the former being an occasional piece staged in small theaters or programmed as an outgrowth of a song recital when resources permit. For this reason the shorter work is informally referred to as Das kleine Mahagonny, or The Little Mahagonny, or as Mahagonny-Songspiel.

== Background ==
Weill was commissioned in the spring to write one of a series of very short operas for performance that summer, and he chose to use the opportunity to create a "stylistic exercise" as preparation for a larger project he and Brecht had begun to develop together (the two had met for the first time in March): the experimental 'epic opera' Rise and Fall of the City of Mahagonny.

Genesis of the work began with five Mahagonny Songs published early in 1927 in Brecht's collection of poetry called Devotions for the Home, or Hauspostille, together with tunes by him. To these was added Poem on a Dead Man, which would become the cantata's Finale. Two numbers were English-language parodies by Elisabeth Hauptmann: the Alabama Song and the Benares Song. Using one or two of Brecht's melodies, Weill began in May to set the songs to music and to compose instrumental interludes. The result was a sequence of eleven numbers:

Song One | Little March | Alabama Song | Vivace | Song Two | Vivace assai | Benares Song | Sostenuto (Choral) | Song Three | Vivace assai | Finale: Poem on a Dead Man

Mahagonny, ein Songspiel premiered at the new German chamber music festival at Baden-Baden on 17 July 1927. Brecht directed, Lotte Lenya played Jessie, and the set-design was by Caspar Neher, who placed the scene in a boxing-ring before background projections that interjected scene-titles at the start of each section. According to a sketch published years later, they read:

1. The great cities in our day are full of people who do not like it there.
2. So get away to Mahagonny, the gold town situated on the shores of consolation far from the rush of the world.
3. Here in Mahagonny life is lovely.
4. But even in Mahagonny there are moments of nausea, helplessness and despair.
5. The men of Mahagonny are heard replying to God's inquiries as to the cause of their sinful life.
6. Lovely Mahagonny crumbles to nothing before your eyes.

A programme note for the performance stated:

Mahagonny is a short epic play which simply draws conclusions from the irresistible decline of our existing social classes. It is already turning towards a public which goes to the theatre naïvely and for fun." The production lasted about forty-five minutes and was a great success, although there were no immediate plans for a revival.

Stephen Sondheim was asked to translate this piece once with W. H. Auden, but declined. He said of this event, "But, I'm not a Brecht/Weill fan and that's really all there is to it. I'm an apostate: I like Weill's music when he came to America better than I do his stuff before...I love The Threepenny Opera but, outside of The Threepenny Opera, the music of his I like is the stuff he wrote in America—when he was not writing with Brecht, when he was writing for Broadway."

== Performance history ==
After its first performance in 1927 with the Deutsches Kammermusikfest under the direction of Walter Brügmann and conducted by Ernst Mehlich, it was presented on 11 December 1932 in Paris at the Salle Gaveau. Hans Curjel directed and Maurice Abravanel was conductor.

Years later, The Little Mahagonny was produced, in a much adapted version, by the Berliner Ensemble at the Theater am Schiffbauerdamm in East Berlin. It opened on 10 February 1963 and was directed by Matthias Langhoff and Manfred Karge.

On 20 January 1971 the Yale Repertory Theater in New Haven presented the work directed by Michael Posnick and conducted by Thomas Fay in a double-bill with Brecht and Weill's The Seven Deadly Sins.

Other notable productions included one by the English National Opera on 8 September 1984, conducted by Lionel Friend; the Brooklyn Academy of Music's production by Peter Sellars, conducted by Craig Smith; and, as part of the 12-hour concert, Wall-to-Wall Kurt Weill, on 30 March 1989 at Symphony Space in New York.

Twenty-first century productions took place on 25 March 2000 in New York by the Ensemble Weill directed by Ari Benjamin Meyers and on 5 and 7 June 2008, the Seattle Symphony under Gerard Schwarz performed the piece.

== Recordings ==
- London Sinfonietta, conducted by David Atherton, with Mary Thomas, Meriel Dickinson, Philip Langridge, Ian Partridge, Benjamin Luxon, and Michael Rippon on Deutsche Grammophon (DGG 423 255-2)
- Jerusalem Symphony Orchestra, conducted by Lukas Foss (Turnabout TV 34675, CD reissue: Vox CDX 5043)
- RIAS Berlin Sinfonietta, conducted by John Mauceri, with Ute Lemper, Susanne Tremper, Helmut Wildhaber, Peter Haage, Thomas Mohr, and Manfred Jungwirth on Decca Records (London CD 430 168-2), doubled with The Seven Deadly Sins
- König Ensemble, conducted by Jan Latham-Koenig, with Gabriele Ramm, Trudeliese Schmidt, Hans Franzen, Walter Raffeiner, Peter Nikolaus Kante, and Horst Hiestermann on Capriccio (Capriccio CD 60 028), doubled with The Seven Deadly Sins
