= Dramaturgy =

Art of dramatic composition

Dramaturgy (conventional, text-based) is the study of dramatic composition and the representation of the main elements of drama on the stage. The role of a dramaturg working on text in the field of modern dramaturgy is to help realize the multifaceted world of the play for a production using information from the script, playwright, the context in which the play was written, and the context in which it is staged. It is a dramaturg's job to assist the director and playwright, especially if the culture of the play is not fully experienced by these people.

The term first appears in Hamburg Dramaturgy (1767–69) by Gotthold Ephraim Lessing. Lessing composed this collection of essays on the principles of drama while working as the world's first dramaturge at the Hamburg National Theatre of Abel Seyler. Dramaturgy is distinct from play writing and directing, although the three may be practiced by one individual. Some dramatists combine writing and dramaturgy when creating a drama. Others work with a specialist, called a dramaturge, to adapt a work for the stage.

Dramaturgy may also be broadly defined as "adapting a story to actable form." Dramaturgy gives a performance work foundation and structure. Often the dramaturge's strategy is to manipulate a narrative to reflect the current Zeitgeist through cross-cultural signs, theater- and film-historical references to genre, ideology, questions of gender and racial representation, etc., in the dramatization.

== History ==
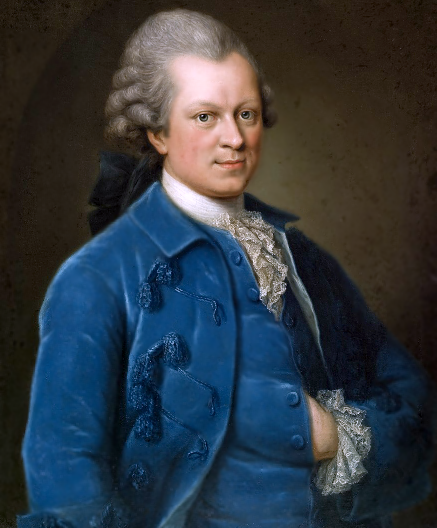
Gotthold Ephraim Lessing

The role of dramaturgy as a practice-based as well as practice-led discipline was first held by Gotthold Ephraim Lessing, in the 18th century. The Theater of Hamburg engaged him for some years for a position today known as a "dramaturge". He was the first to occupy this role in European theater and described his task as that of a "dramatic judge" ("dramatischer Richter"), one who must assess the most compelling and appropriate means of staging a particular theatrical work. At the time, Germany was less of a nation and more of a collection of principalities. Lessing was hired at the newly created national theatre to promote a distinctly German artistic culture. Although he only spent two years in the position, Lessing laid the foundations for future dramaturgical work. From 1767 to 1770, Lessing published a series of critical commentaries, Hamburg Dramaturgy (Hamburgische Dramaturgie). These works analyzed, criticized and theorized the current state of German theater, making Lessing the father of modern dramaturgy.

Following Lessing's Hamburgische Dramaturgie and Laokoon and Hegel's Aesthetics (1835–38), many subsequent authors, including Friedrich Hölderlin, Johann von Goethe, Friedrich Wilhelm Joseph Schelling, Thornton Wilder, Arthur Miller, and Tennessee Williams, reflected on the stage language of plays as a distinctive art form.

German playwright Gustav Freytag attempted to synthesize the components of modern dramaturgy in his 1863 book The Technique of the Drama, published in English in 1894. Known for its outline of the principles of dramatic structure, including the arc of dramatic tension and resolution referred to as Freytag's Pyramid, The Technique of the Drama is often considered the blueprint for the first Hollywood screenwriting manuals. The Technique of Play Writing (1915) by Charlton Andrews, refers to European and German traditions of dramaturgy and understanding dramatic composition.

=== Historical works ===
These are examples that define theatrical tradition throughout history.

==== Poetics ====
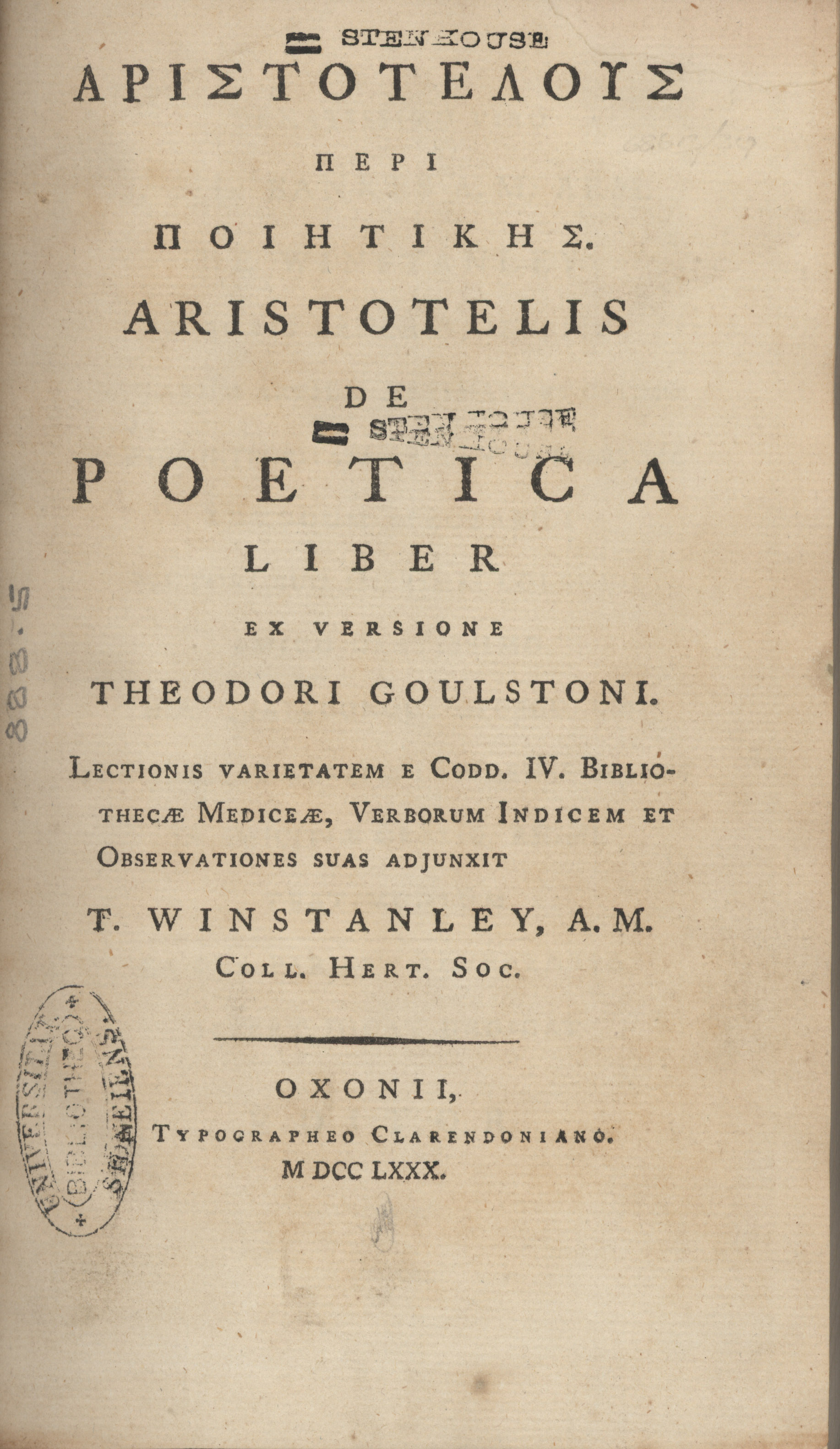
1780 edition of the Poetics

A foundational work in the Western theatrical tradition is Poetics by Aristotle (written c. 335 BCE), which analyzes the genre of tragedy. Aristotle considers Oedipus Rex (c. 429 BCE) as the quintessential dramatic work. He analyzes the relations among character, action, and speech, gives examples of good plots, and considers the role of audience response as an aspect of theatrical form. His "rules" are referred to today as "Aristotelian drama". In Poetics, Aristotle discusses many key concepts of Greek drama, including the moment of tragic recognition (anagnorisis) and the purgation of audience feelings of pity and fear (catharsis).

==== Sanskrit ====
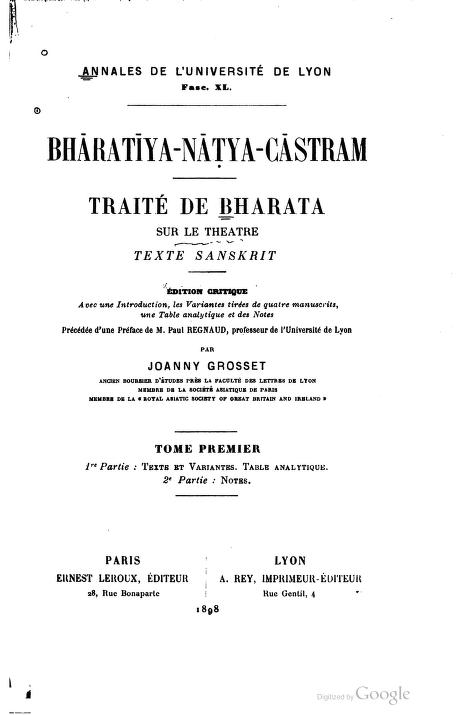
1898 copy of the Nāṭya Shāstra

Poetics is the earliest surviving Western work of dramatic theory. The earliest non-Western dramaturgic work is probably the Sanskrit work Nātya Shāstra (The Art of Theatre), written around 500 BCE to 500 CE. It is thought to have been written by a number of people, the core of which was compiled by the dramatist Bharata. This work describes the elements, forms, and narrative elements of the ten major types of ancient Indian drama. One of the concepts expressed in the Nāṭya Shāstra is the idea of bhaavas, or the emotions expressed by the actors. There are 33 bhaavas mentioned, including love, horror, excitement, etc. These are intended to evoke rasa for the audience. Rasa is hard to define in English, since there is not an English equivalent for this word, but it represents the emotions felt by the audience, which is separate from emotions experienced through real life. The term rasa first appeared in the Nāṭya Shāstra.

==== Epic Theatre ====
Perhaps the most significant successor to Aristotelian dramaturgy is the Epic theatre developed by the twentieth century German playwright Bertolt Brecht. Many of the innovations associated with Brecht as a theorist and writer for the stage, including the concept of the "estrangement effect" (or Verfremdungseffekt) and the acting technique known as gestus, were intended as deliberate revisions of the values upheld by Aristotle.

== Practice ==
Dramaturgy is a comprehensive exploration of the context in which the play resides. The dramaturge is tasked to obtain expertise on: the physical, social, political, and economic environment in which the action takes place; the psychological underpinnings of the characters; the various metaphorical expressions in the play of thematic concerns; as well as the technical consideration of the play as a piece of writing (structure, rhythm, flow, and even individual word choices).

Institutional dramaturges may participate in many phases of play production including: casting of the play; offering in-house criticism of productions-in-progress; and informing the director, the cast, and the audience about a play’s history and its current importance. In America, this type of dramaturgy is sometimes known as Production Dramaturgy. Institutional or production dramaturges may make files of materials about a play's history or social context, prepare program notes, lead post-production discussions, or write study guides for schools and groups. These actions can assist a director in integrating textual and acting criticism, performance theory, and historical research into a production before it opens.

In the early 21st century, dramaturgy can include drametrics, a quantitative approach introduced by dramaturg and theatre scholar, Magda Romanska in 2014. Drametrics, or computational dramaturgy, applies mathematical and computational methods to analyze dramatic texts, combining traditional dramaturgical analysis with digital humanities techniques. This methodology allows dramaturgs to discover structural patterns, character relationships, and dramatic rhythms through computational tools like configuration matrices and network analysis. While traditional dramaturgy relies on close reading and interpretation, drametrics complements this approach by revealing patterns and structures that might not be apparent through conventional analysis, particularly when examining large bodies of dramatic work or comparing multiple texts systematically.

== Copyright ==
Since dramaturgy is defined in a general way and the function of a dramaturge may vary from production to production, the copyright issues regarding it in the United States have very vague borders.

In 1996, there was debate on the question of the extent to which a dramaturge can claim ownership of a production, as in the case involving the estate of Jonathan Larson, author of the musical Rent and Lynn Thomson, the dramaturge on the production. Thomson claimed that she was a co-author of the work and that she never assigned, licensed or otherwise transferred her rights. She asked that the court declare her a co-author of Rent and grant her 16 percent of the author's share of the royalties. Although she made her claim only after the show became a Broadway hit, the case is not without precedent. For instance, 15 percent of the royalties of Angels in America go to playwright Tony Kushner's dramaturge. On June 19, 1998, the United States Court of Appeals for the Second Circuit affirmed the original court's ruling that Thomson was not entitled to be credited with co-authorship of Rent and that she was not entitled to royalties. The case was ultimately settled out of court with Thomson receiving an undisclosed sum after she threatened to remove her material from the production.

== See also ==
- Dramatic structure
- Writing Drama, whose original title is "La Dramaturgie"
