= Historicization =

Historicization (becoming history) is commonly referred to the transition of an item from an object of current events to an object of historical interest or to the process of gradual change in perception and interpretation of an object or idea over time.

== Brecht ==
The principle of historicization is a fundamental part of the aesthetic developed by the German modernist theatre practitioner Bertolt Brecht.

In his poem "Speech to Danish working-class actors on the art of observation", Brecht offers a vivid portrait of the attitude he suggested an actor should cultivate:

Imagine all that is going on around you, all those struggles
Picturing them just like historical incidents
For this is how you should go on to portray them on the stage:
The fight for a job, sweet and bitter conversations
Between the man and his woman, arguments about books
Resignation and revolt, attempt and failure
All these you will go on to portray as historical incidents.
(Even what is happening here, at this moment, with us, is something you
Can regard as a picture in this way).

For the actor, "historicization" constitutes a fundamental interpretative attitude (what Brecht calls a "grund-gestus").

== See also ==
- Periodization
