= Not / But =

Acting technique

Not / But, or the "not…but" element, is an acting technique that forms part of the Brechtian approach to performance. In its simplest form, fixing the not/but element involves the actor preceding each thought that is expressed by their character in the dialogue or each action performed by their character in the scene with its dialectical opposite. Rather than portraying a thought or action as "naturally" arising from the given circumstances of the scene or "inevitably" following from them, this technique underlines the aspect of decision in the thought or action. "He didn't say 'come in' but 'keep moving'", Brecht offers by way of example; "He was not pleased but amazed":

They include an expectation which is justified by experience but, in the event, disappointed. One might have thought that ... but one oughtn't to have thought it. There was not just one possibility but two; both are introduced, then the second one is defamiliarized, then the first as well.

This technique is a rehearsal exercise; the verbalizing of the alternative (the "not" of the "not/but") is not necessarily preserved in performance. Its main function is to inscribe traces of the alternatives that were available to the character at each 'nodal point' in their journey within the finished portrait in performance. The effect gives the impression of a "sketching" in the actor's performance, in the sense that with an artist's sketch traces of alternative lines and movements are preserved, overlapping the main defining line rather than being erased. It is this quality that leads Fredric Jameson to contrast Brechtian theatre favourably with what he calls the "well-made production", insofar as its preservation of the actor's process in the final product acts as a form of demystification and de-fetishization, and exploits a potential strength of the medium of theatre:

The well-made production is one from which the traces of its rehearsals have been removed (just as from the successfully reified commodity the traces of production itself have been made to disappear): Brecht opens up this surface, and allows us to see back down into the alternative gestures and postures of the actors trying out their roles: so it is that aesthetic experimentation generally—which has so often been understood as generating the new and the hitherto unexperienced, the radical innovation—might just as well be grasped as the "experimental" attempt to ward off reification (something the other arts, from novels and films to poetry, painting, and musical performance, even aleatory performance, are structurally and materially less qualified to do).

The result of the technique of fixing the not/but is to shape and clarify the character's behaviour in a particular, interpretative direction (a historical materialist one).

== Works cited ==
- Brecht, Bertolt. 1964. Brecht on Theatre: The Development of an Aesthetic. Ed. and trans. John Willett. British edition. London: Methuen. ISBN 0-413-38800-X. USA edition. New York: Hill and Wang. ISBN 0-8090-3100-0.
- Jameson, Fredric. 1998. Brecht and Method. London and New York: Verso. ISBN 1-85984-809-5.
- Willett, John. 1964. Editorial notes. In Brecht on Theatre: The Development of an Aesthetic by Bertolt Brecht. British edition. London: Methuen. ISBN 0-413-38800-X. USA edition. New York: Hill and Wang. ISBN 0-8090-3100-0.
