= Mooreeffoc =

Perspective effect

Mooreeffoc, also known as the Mooreeffoc effect, refers to what stylisticians call "defamiliarization". G. K. Chesterton used the phrase in his 1906 book Charles Dickens: A Critical Study to "denote the queerness of things that have become trite, when they are seen suddenly from a new angle".

The word, however, is first found in John Forster's 1872 Life of Dickens.

In the door there was an oval glass plate, with COFFEE-ROOM painted on it, addressed towards the street. If I ever find myself in a very different kind of coffee-room now, but where there is such an inscription on glass, and read it backward on the wrong side MOOREEFFOC (as I often used to do then…) a shock goes through my blood.

It has been noted that the Mooreeffoc effect characterises Charles Dickens' four comic short stories for children of 1868 published as Holiday Romance. In these, the stories are "told" by child-narrators aged between "half-past six" and nine, and so have a child-like perspective that inverts the narrative "norm". These have been related to Lewis Carroll and his 1865 Alice's Adventures in Wonderland and "there are clear parallels between Carroll's work with its inversions and subversions and Holiday Romance, overshadowed as the latter has been".

J. R. R. Tolkien also used the word in the same sense in his essay "On Fairy-Stories", perhaps picking up on G. K. Chesterton's added observation that Dickens displays "this elvish kind of realism ... everywhere".

== See also ==
- Cellar door (phrase)
- Distancing effect
- Defamiliarization
- Nacirema
