= Epic Theatre Ensemble =

American theatre

- Formation: 2001
- Founders: Ron Russell, Melissa Friedman, Zak Berkman, James Wallert, Teri Lamm, Craig Rovere, and Shaheen Vaaz
- Type: Theatre group
- Location: New York City
- Website: www.epictheatreensemble.org

The Epic Theatre Ensemble is an American theatre in New York City. As well staging well known traditional plays, its productions often focus on promoting engaged citizenship and social change.

== History ==
The Epic Theatre Ensemble was founded in 2001 by original members Ron Russell, Melissa Friedman, Zak Berkman, James Wallert, Teri Lamm, Craig Rovere, and Shaheen Vaaz. Its work is influenced by the Epic Theatre movement.

In 2009, the Ensemble's remix of Shakespeare’s plays performed in several New York City Public Schools was awarded the National Arts and Humanities Youth Program Award, then called the Coming Up Taller Award.

Significant productions include the 2010 rendition of Sarah Ruhl’s Passion Play and Pike Street in 2015.

In 2012, the theatre received funding from the National Endowment for the Arts to create a contemporary interpretation of Shakespeare's MacBeth.

As well as performing traditional dramas, the Ensemble also commissions and stages new plays.

The Ensemble includes both professional and student actors. In 2016, Epic Theatre Ensemble presented 10467, a fifty-minute play that discusses educational equity in New York City's public schools. . The play was written and performed by students of Epic's artistic and youth development program Epic NEXT
