= Drametrics =

Drametrics is a quantitative approach to analyzing dramatic texts that emerged as part of the broader field of computational criticism (distant reading) and digital humanities. The term was introduced by Polish-American scholar and playwright, Magda Romanska in 2014 in her essay "Drametrics: What Dramaturgs Should Learn From Mathematicians" included in The Routledge Companion to Dramaturgy.

In her foundational essay, Romanska traces how mathematics had been implicitly present in dramatic theory since the 19th century, citing Gustav Freytag's geometric patterns of dramatic structure in classic Greek tragedy as an early example of mathematical thinking applied to dramatic analysis. Based on this, Romanska proposed a transvergent theory of dramatic structure that combines classical Aristotelian dramatic theory with mathematical and computational methods to analyze theatrical works.

Romanska posits that these mathematical relationships contribute to the aesthetic and dramatic effectiveness of theatrical works, just as the golden ratio (approximately 1.618:1) and Fibonacci spiral appear in classical architecture and visual art.

Romanska shows not only that the drametrics theory works for the conventional well-made play, such as Henrik Ibsen’s A Doll’s House, but also for the more contemporary dramas such as Samuel Beckett’s Waiting for Godot.

== Overview ==
The fundamental premise of drametrics is that dramatic works contain measurable structural elements that can be computationally analyzed to reveal patterns and insights about their composition. This approach builds upon earlier work in mathematical poetics, particularly Solomon Marcus's "Mathematical Poetics" from the 1970s in which he introduced the concept of "configuration matrices" - tables showing which characters appear together in different scenes. These matrices revealed patterns in character relationships and dramatic structure.

== Key Components ==
=== Character Networks and Configurations Analysis ===
One of the primary applications of drametrics involves analyzing character interactions and relationships within plays through:

- Configuration matrices showing character co-appearances in scenes
- Network density and interaction pattern analysis.
- Dialogue distribution analysis
- Identification of character centrality and clustering

For example, when analyzing Shakespeare's plays, researchers can create matrices showing how often characters appear together in scenes. This reveals important structural elements like:

- The centrality of certain characters to the plot
- Clusters or groups of characters that frequently interact
- The isolation or connection of different character groups
- Changes in character configurations throughout the play

=== Computational Methods ===
Modern applications of drametrics often employ computational methods to analyze dramatic texts:

- Text analysis algorithms for structural pattern identification
- Network analysis tools for mapping character relationships
- Data mining and machine learning
- Statistical analysis of dialogue distribution
- Automated scene detection based on character configurations
- Topic modeling for thematic pattern identification
- Sentiment analysis for tracking emotional arcs
- Linguistic analysis of dialogue patterns

Recent tools like Katharsis have been developed specifically for computational analysis, allowing researchers to automatically analyze quantitative aspects of dramatic texts and visualize character networks These tools can process TEI-XML encoded drama texts to extract metadata, dialogue statistics, and structural information

=== Scene Detection and Analysis ===
An important aspect of drametrics involves computationally identifying scene boundaries and dramatic units. Rather than relying solely on explicit scene divisions, researchers can use algorithms to detect natural breaks in the dramatic action based on:

- Changes in which characters are present
- Shifts in dialogue patterns
- Thematic transitions in the text
- Character entrance and exit patterns
- Structural breaks in dramatic action

The VED (Visually Encoded Drama) format has emerged as a standardized way to encode dramatic texts for computational analysis, with each textual entity (line, character speech, stage direction) corresponding to a single line in the format. This enables efficient digital processing and visual inspection of dramatic structure.

== Applications ==
=== Academic Research ===
Modern drametrics often combines multiple computational approaches. For instance, researchers might use both character network analysis and topic modeling to understand how thematic elements correlate with character interactions.

Drametrics can:

- Reveal structural and network patterns that might not be apparent through traditional close reading
- Enable large-scale comparative analysis across multiple plays
- Provide quantitative evidence for literary theories
- Help identify distinctive features of different dramatic genres and styles

=== Practical Applications ===
The methodology has practical applications in:

- Playwriting and dramatic composition
- Verse analysis
- Drama education
- Drama therapy
- Theatre criticism
- Computational dramaturgy
- Performance analysis
- Directing

== Academic Impact ==
Drametrics has influenced several areas of theatre studies:

- Dramatic structure analysis
- Computational dramaturgy
- Character relationship mapping
- Performance theory
- Digital humanities approaches to theatre

== Recent Developments ==
Current research in drametrics has expanded to include:

- Integration with artificial intelligence and machine learning
- Application to new media and digital performance (hybrid physical-digital performance spaces)
- Cross-cultural analysis of dramatic structures
- Development of computational tools for dramatic analysis
- Analysis of video game narratives and digital interactive storytelling
- Analyses of text by using statistical inference methods
- Computational Dramaturgy framework.

=== Criticism and Debate ===
Some scholars have questioned whether mathematical patterns in dramatic works are intentional or coincidental. Some have argued that successful plays may naturally exhibit certain proportions without conscious mathematical design.

== See also ==
- Dramaturgy
- Network theory
- Digital humanities
- Computational linguistics
