= Patrice Pavis =

- Born: 1947 (age 78–79); United Kingdom
- Occupation: Former Professor of theatrical studies
- Awards: Georges Jamati Prize

Patrice Pavis (born 1947) was Professor for Theatre Studies at the University of Kent in Canterbury, England (UK), where he retired at the end of the academic year 2015/16. He has written extensively about performance, focusing his study and research mainly in semiology and interculturalism in theatre. He was awarded the Georges Jamati Prize in 1986.

== Academic Positions ==
Around 1983–84, Pavis was teaching in the Institute of Theatre Studies at Paris III University. Patrice Pavis was also Professor of Theatre Studies at Paris VIII University.

== Concept of "verbo-corps" ==
In 1987, Pavis suggested a new theory regarding the translation of dramatic works. The idea of 'verbo-corps' has been described as "highly theoretical" and criticized for leaving "a gap between theory and translatory practice which cannot be closed". The theory suggests a culture-specific union between language and gesture used subconsciously by every writer. Pavis suggested that the translator needed to be able to comprehend the union in the original and reconstruct it in the translation.

== Published works ==
- Problèmes de sémiologie théâtrale, Presses de l'Université du Québec (1976)
- Languages of the Stage: Essays in the Semiology of Theatre, PAJ Publications (1982)
- Voix et images de la scène: vers une sémiologie de la réception, Presses universitaires de Lille (1985)
- Marivaux à l'épreuve de la scène, Université de Paris-III (1986)
- Dictionnaire du théâtre, Messidors/Editions Sociales (1980)
- Le théâtre au croisement des cultures, Jose Corti (1990)
- The Intercultural Performance Reader, Routledge (1996) (Ed.)
- L'analyse des spectacles: théâtre, mime, danse, danse-théâtre, cinéma, Armand Colin (2005)
- La mise en scène contemporaine: origines, tendances, perspectives, Armand Colin (2007)
- Dictionnaire de la performance et du théâtre contemporain, Armand Colin (2014)
