= Simon Spiegel =

Swiss German privatdozent for film studies and critic

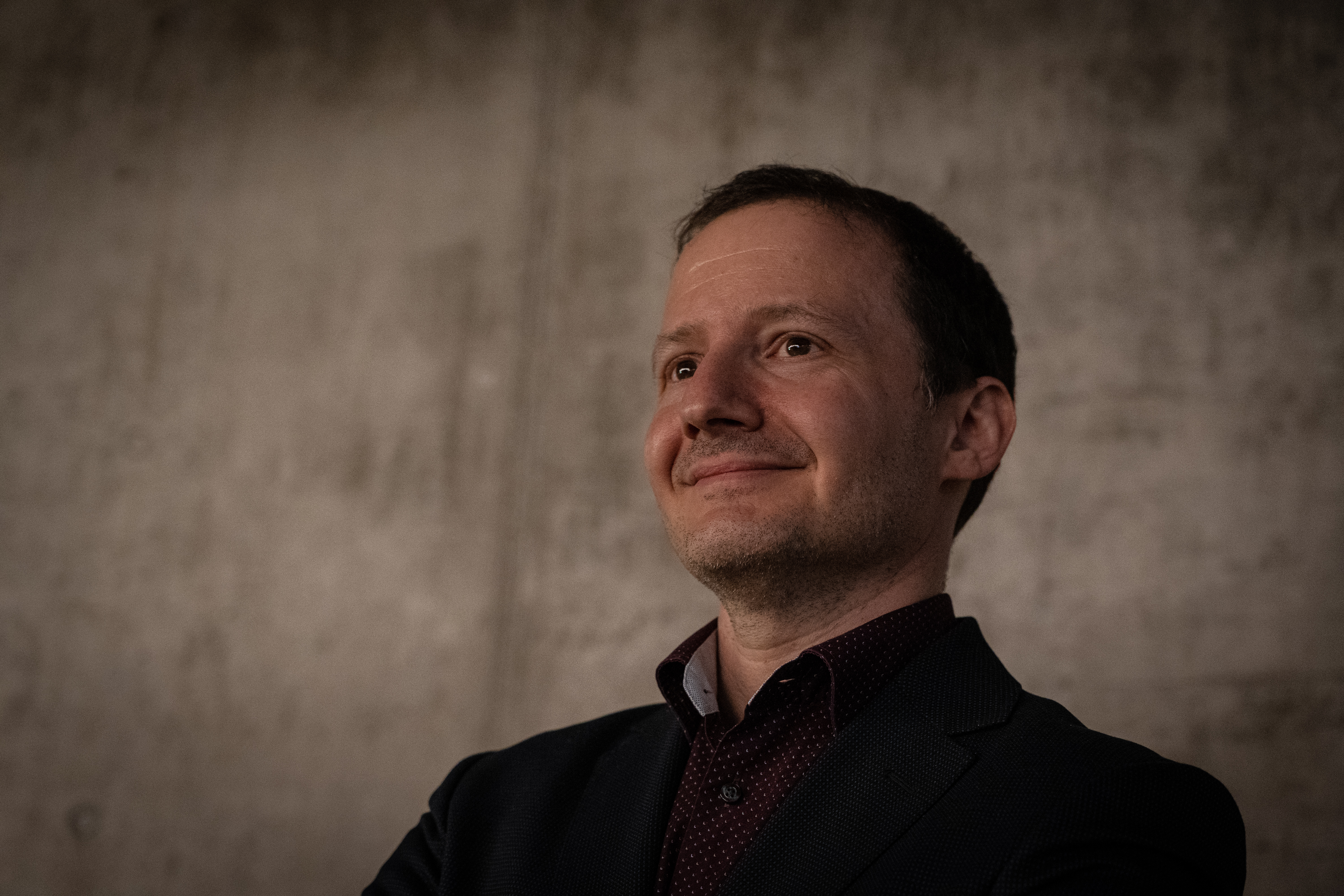
Simon Spiegel

Simon Spiegel (born 10 June 1977 in Basel) is a Swiss German privatdozent for film studies and film critic.

== Life ==
After completing his Matura in Basel in 1996, Spiegel studied German studies, film studies, and history at the University of Zurich. In 2007, he earned his doctorate in film studies there with his dissertation Die Konstitution des Wunderbaren (The Constitution of the Marvelous). In 2018, he completed his habilitation in media studies at the University of Bayreuth with Bilder einer besseren Welt (Images of a Better World). In 2023, he transferred his habilitation in film studies to the University of Zurich.

In his research, he focuses particularly on cinematic forms of science fiction and utopia, theories of the fantastic, and the phenomenon of spoilers.

Spiegel is a founding member of the Society for Fantastic Research and co-editor of the Journal for Fantastic Research.

In the past, he worked as a film critic for numerous Swiss daily newspapers, including Basler Zeitung, Blick, and Neue Zürcher Zeitung. Today, he writes regularly for the film magazine Filmbulletin and the online magazine Republik.

From 2008 to 2014, Spiegel was co-director of the documentary film section Semaine de la Critique at the Locarno Film Festival.

In 2022, he organized the first academic conference on the topic of spoilers, together with Christine Lötscher.

From 2021 to 2024, he was the president of the board of Fantoche, the animation film festival in Baden, Switzerland.

== Selected works ==
- Utopias in Nonfiction Film. Palgrave Macmillan, Basingstoke 2021, ISBN 978-3-030-79822-2
- Bilder einer besseren Welt. Die Utopie im nichtfiktionalen Film. Schüren, Marburg 2019, ISBN 978-3-7410-0340-0 (also available online as Open Access)
- Theoretisch phantastisch. Eine Einführung in Tzvetan Todorovs Theorie der phantastischen Literatur. p.machinery, Murnau am Staffelsee 2010, ISBN 978-3-942533-12-6
- Die Konstitution des Wunderbaren. Zu einer Poetik des Science-Fiction-Films. Schüren, Marburg 2007, ISBN 978-3-89472-516-7

=== As co-editor ===
- Together with Andrea Reiter and Marcy Goldberg: Utopia and Reality. Documentary, Activism and Imagined Worlds. University of Wales Press, Cardiff 2020, ISBN 978-1-78683-524-6

=== Newspapers ===
- Co-editor: Zeitschrift für Fantastikforschung, Open Library of Humanities, ISSN 2192-0885

== Awards ==
In 2017, Spiegel was awarded the Prix Pathé – Film Journalism Award for an article in Filmbulletin about the film Electroboy.

In 2024, Spiegel was awarded the Jamie Bishop Memorial Award by the International Association for the Fantastic in the Arts for the best non-English-language essay on the fantastic for his paper Die immobile Vierfaltigkeit. Zu The Terminator und Terminator 2: Judgment Day.
