= Dramatic convention =

Trope employed in theatre

A dramatic convention is a convention or trope in the form of any specific action or techniques that an actor, theatre director, or playwright employs, which both an audience and actors are familiar with, serving as a useful way to quickly create a desired effect, understanding, or context for the audience.

All forms of theatre have dramatic conventions, some of which may be unique to that particular form, such as the poses used by actors in Japanese kabuki theatre to establish a character, or the stock character of the black-cloaked, mustache-twirling villain in early cinema melodrama serials.

It can also include an implausible facet of a performance required by the technical limitations or artistic nature of a production and which is accepted by the audience as part of suspension of disbelief. For example, a dramatic convention in Shakespeare is that a character can move downstage to deliver a soliloquy which cannot be heard by the other characters on stage. Similarly, the characters in a musical are never surprised by another character bursting into song, and may indeed join in with the song and choreography at a moment's notice, in a way entirely implausible in real life. One more example would be how the audience accepts the passage of time during a play or how music will play during a romantic scene.

Dramatic conventions may be categorized into groups, such as rehearsal, technical, or theatrical. Rehearsal conventions can include hot seating, roles on the wall, and still images. Technical conventions can include lighting, dialogue, monologue, set, costuming, and entrances/exits. Theatrical conventions may include split focus, flashback/flashforward, narration, soliloquy, and spoken thought.

All categories of dramatic conventions may be used in creative drama to support educators teaching dramatic arts. "Jonothan Neelands and Tony Goode note that the experience of drama requires teachers to use forms and structures that engage both the intellect and emotions in making and representing collaborative meaning. [...] As you work in drama, you will discover other modes of representing meaning and your repertoire of ideas for containing and shaping the work will expand and become refined." Educators use dramatic conventions in integrated and cross-curricular instruction – particularly literacy and the humanities – to make meaningful educational experiences for students.

== See also ==
- Fourth wall
- Suspension of disbelief
