= Separation of the elements =

Separation of the elements is an aesthetic principle formulated by the German modernist theatre practitioner Bertolt Brecht. The principle bears primarily on the theatrical register, though it has implications for the dramatic and performative as well. The principle of the "separation of the elements" stands in diametric opposition to that of the "integrated work of art" proposed by Wagner, which refers to a work of art that enables the use of various other visual forms. Brecht utilises the "separation of elements" in conjunction with his other "Epic Theatre" techniques to educate his audience of the social and political context of 20th century Germany.

== Brecht's Theories and Influences ==
The principle of the "separation of elements" stemmed from Brecht's development of "Epic Theatre" which advocated that a play should encourage rational self-reflection and a critical assessment of the event on stage, rather than causing the audience to invest and empathise with the characters emotionally or the action in front of them. The implementation of this theatrical framework intended to challenge and stretch dramaturgical norms and essentially transcend the way theatre was being perceived and created in a postmodern society. Hence, Brecht developed various other theories which set to re-introduce the theatrical realm which included;

- The Alienation Effect
- Complex Seeing
- Demonstration
- Gestus
- The Street Scene
