= A Short Organum for the Theatre =

Theoretical work on theatre

"A Short Organum for the Theatre" ("Kleines Organon für das Theater") is a theoretical work by the twentieth-century German theatre practitioner Bertolt Brecht. It was written while in Switzerland in 1948 and published in 1949. In a diary note from the time he refers to it as a "short condensation of the 'Messingkauf'"; when it was re-published in 1953 he identified it as a "description of a theatre of the scientific age"; later still he augmented it with some appendices and linked it to his notes for a "dialectical theatre".

== Against Poetics ==
Returning in the history of theater to the Poetics of Aristotle and taking as an example ancient tragedies and comedies, he rejects the idea of catharsis: "What liberation is this, given that at the end of all these plays, which worked happily only because of the spirit of their time (providence - the moral order), we live a dream-like execution that punishes exaltation as much as debaucheries?" Brecht here makes reference to the tragedies of Sophocles, and to the comedies and dramas of Shakespeare. He takes Oedipus as an example and mentions that there is still an interest in producing/performing it because such taboos still exist. He attacks the core of the Poetics, that is, the finality of the tragedy. The critique that he made of the Poetics would become the center of his own poetics and of "Epic Theater".

== Politics ==
He also points out that beyond purging souls, it would be a mistake for theater to try to reproduce the reality of its spectators exactly on stage. He did not believe this identification between the viewer and the dramatic character was acceptable to the needs of the modern stage. Instead, there should be a different kind of relationship between the protagonists and the spectators. This relationship, or rather, this phenomenon, he called Verfremdungseffekt (in English, distancing or the alienation effect).

This concept of alienation lies at the "boundary of aesthetics and politics". It consists in "having an object, a character, a process perceived, and at the same time, rendering it unexpected, strange." The goal is to "push the viewer to establish some distance in his relation to reality", to wake him or her up to reality. The effect would allow the viewer to become conscious of his or her own existence or intrinsic reality within the context of the themes of the production. Verfremdungseffekt thus politicizes consciousness and overcomes the alienation of the individual.

Brecht says the great progressive themes of our time: to know that the evils of humanity are in the hands of mankind itself, that is to say that the world can be managed, that Art can and should intervene in History; that it should accomplish the same tasks as the sciences, with which it shares so much. Theater should resolutely come to the aid of the unfurling of the historical process; that stage-techniques themselves are socially engaged; and that in the end there is no eternal "essence" of art, but rather that "each society should invent the art that disposes it best to its own redemption".

== Observation: imitation and reflection ==
The actor should examine the world around him. With all his being he must pay attention to gestures, and imitate the world through a process of reflection. He must amplify what he observes, because the original is too subtle, "it speaks too softly".

The construction of one character happens simultaneously with all the others. The actor must take possession of his character and critically calculate its various manifestations. Learning a character is not only a critical process, but one that must evolve with the development of the other characters. The fictive object is a character that has evolved in a society, a given situation, and owes its construction to relationships with other characters.

The "possession" of the actor by the character, and beauty for its own sake, are some of the aspects of traditional acting to which Bertolt Brecht was opposed.

== Not X, but Y ==
It is important for the actor to understand "not too quickly". He must reflect and interrogate himself about the possibilities; he should surprise himself. Brecht suggested this should be done in terms of an actor evaluating their choices first in terms of what they were not doing, and then in terms of what they were doing. Every choice has an opposite that the actor needs be aware of. In the scientific age, an actor should be able to play an emotion sociologically, by the interaction of the ensemble of characters.

== Bibliography ==
- Petit Organon pour le théâtre, Éd. De L’Arche, Paris, 1948 (Fragments 34, 47 à 49, 58 à 62, )
