= Alea (Greek soldier) =

According to the Etymologiae by Isidore of Seville, Alea was a Greek soldier of the Trojan War who invented the dicing game tabula. French sociologist Roger Caillois uses the term "alea" to designate those games which rely on luck rather than skill in Man, Play and Games. While Caillois notes the term is the Roman word for games of chance, Robert C. Bell suggests that the Greek game tabula, a precursor to modern backgammon, became more commonly known as "alea" "towards the end of the sixth century". However, games historian H. J. R. Murray asserts the shift in nomenclature was in the other direction and the game "alea" was later referred to as "tabula".
