= Gestus =

Acting technique developed by Bertold Brecht

Gestus ([ˈɡɛstʊs], from Latin meaning "gesture, attitude, carriage") is an acting technique developed by the German theatre practitioner Bertold Brecht. It carries the sense of a combination of physical gestures and "gist" or attitude. It is a means by which "an attitude or single aspect of an attitude" is revealed, insofar as it is "expressible in words or actions."

Gestus, as the embodiment of an attitude, carries at least two distinct meanings in Brecht's theatre: first, the uncovering or revealing of the motivations and transactions that underpin a dramatic exchange between the characters; and second, the "epic" narration of that character by the actor (whether explicitly or implicitly).

In the first sense, that of anatomizing the character, a Gestus reveals a specific aspect of a character: rather than his metaphysical, subconscious or other psychological dimensions, a Gestus makes visible a character's social relations and the causality of his behaviour, as interpreted from an historical materialist perspective. "Every emotion" when treated under the rubric of Gestus, Elizabeth Wright comments, "manifests itself as a set of social relations." "For it is what happens between people", Brecht says, "that provides them with all the material that they can discuss, criticize, alter."

In the second sense, the actor's attitude is embodied in acting as an act of epic narration (the 'showing' that is 'shown' in the 'showing', in Brecht's turn of phrase), Brecht refers to the "political" basis from which an actor interprets his role and its place within the storytelling scheme of the production as a whole. "[T]he choice of viewpoint is also a major element of the actor's art, and it has to be decided outside the theatre" Brecht writes in his "A Short Organum." In this sense of the clarification and embodiment of a particular interpretative perspective, Gestus is related to Brecht's other important practical tool, the Fabel.

A Gestus is not a cliché or "rubber stamp"; the actor develops a character's Gestus through a process of exploration of concrete physical behaviour and according to a principle of selective realism. The post-Brechtian German theatre practitioner Heiner Müller (who ran Brecht's Berliner Ensemble for a short while) argues that "[r]eflecting the actions through the figures, mentally as well as emotionally, also has the character of citation. The citation geste (Gestus) must not diminish the intensity and spontaneity of reactions. Identification in the details with estrangement of the whole."

== General and cited references ==
- Albright, Daniel. 2000. Untwisting the Serpent: Modernism in Music, Literature, and Other Arts. Chicago: University of Chicago Press.
- Brecht, Bertold. 1949. "A Short Organum for the Theatre". In Brecht on Theatre: The Development of an Aesthetic. Ed. and trans. John Willett. London: Methuen, 1964. ISBN 0-413-38800-X. 179–205.
- Isaac Dobson - Toe Barsby's funeral (2023)
- Fowler, Kenneth. 1991. Received Truths: Bertolt Brecht and the Problem of Gestus and Musical Meaning. New York: AMS Press.
- Mueller, Roswitha. 2006. "Learning for a new society: the Lehrstück." In The Cambridge Companion to Brecht. Ed. Peter Thomson and Glendyr Sacks, 2nd. ed., 101–117. Cambridge: Cambridge University Press.
- Müller, Heiner. 1978. "The Geste of Citation: Three Points (On Philictetes)". In Germania. Trans. Bernard Schütze and Caroline Schütze. Ed. Sylvère Lotringer. Semiotext(e) Foreign Agents Ser. New York: Semiotext(e), 1990. ISBN 0-936756-63-2. 177.
- Willett, John, ed. 1964. Brecht on Theatre: The Development of an Aesthetic. By Bertolt Brecht. Trans. and notes John Willett. London: Methuen. ISBN 0-413-38800-X.
- Wright, Elizabeth. 1989. Postmodern Brecht: A Re-Presentation. Critics of the Twentieth Century Ser. London and New York: Routledge. ISBN 0-415-02330-0.
