= Epic theatre =

Theatrical genre

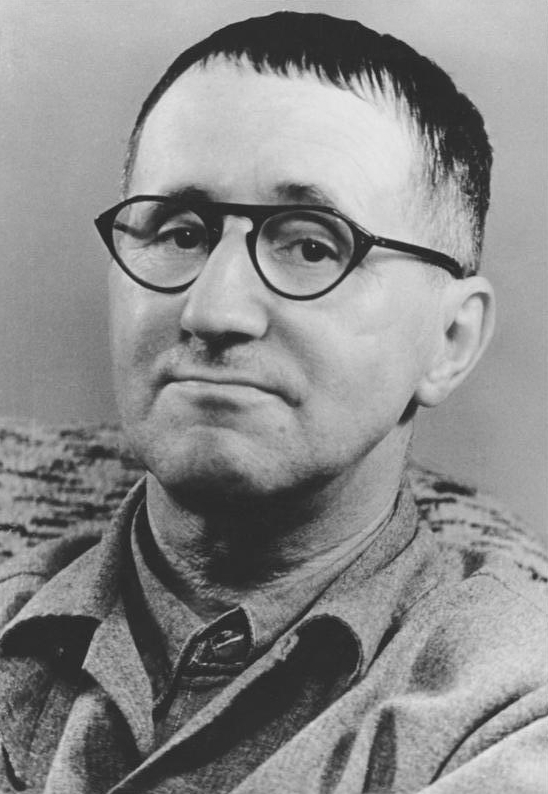
Bertolt Brecht in 1954

Epic theatre (German: episches Theater) is a theatrical movement that arose in the early to mid-20th century from the theories and practice of a number of theatre practitioners who responded to the political climate of the time through the creation of new political dramas. Epic theatre is not meant to refer to the scale or the scope of the work, but rather to the form that it takes. Epic theatre emphasizes the audience's perspective and reaction to the piece through a variety of techniques that deliberately cause them to individually engage in a different way. The purpose of epic theatre is not to encourage an audience to suspend their disbelief, but rather to force them to see their world as it is.

== History ==
The term "epic theatre" comes from Erwin Piscator who coined it during his first year as director of Berlin's Volksbühne (1924–27). Piscator aimed to encourage playwrights to address issues related to "contemporary existence." This new subject matter would then be staged by means of documentary effects, audience interaction, and strategies to cultivate an objective response. Epic theatre incorporates a mode of acting that utilises what Brecht calls gestus. One of Brecht's most-important aesthetic innovations prioritised function over the sterile dichotomous opposition between form and content. Epic theatre and its many forms is a response to Richard Wagner's idea of "Gesamtkunstwerk", or "total artwork", which intends each piece of art to be composed of other art forms. Since epic theatre is so focused on the specific relationship between form and content, these two ideas contradict each other, despite the fact that Brecht was heavily influenced by Wagner. Brecht discussed the priorities and approach of epic theatre in his work "A Short Organum for the Theatre". Although many of the concepts and practices involved in Brechtian epic theatre had been around for years, even centuries, Brecht unified them, developed the approach, and popularised it.

Near the end of his career, Brecht preferred the term "dialectical theatre" to describe the kind of theatre he pioneered. From his later perspective, the term "epic theatre" had become too formal a concept to be of use anymore. According to Manfred Wekwerth, one of Brecht's directors at the Berliner Ensemble at the time, the term refers to the "'dialecticising' of events" that this approach to theatre-making produces.

John Willett states that "where English criticism uses the term [epic] to convey heroic scale, more or less irrespective of the type of work, in German its primary meaning is a particular narrative form . . . Strictly speaking, ‘epic’ is an Aristotelian term for a form of narrative that is not tied to time."

Epic theatre is distinct from other forms of theatre, particularly the early naturalistic approach and later "psychological realism" developed by Konstantin Stanislavski. Like Stanislavski, Brecht disliked the shallow spectacle, manipulative plots, and heightened emotion of melodrama; but where Stanislavski attempted to engender real human behaviour in acting through the techniques of Stanislavski's system and to absorb the audience completely in the fictional world of the play, Brecht saw this type of theatre as escapist. Brecht's own social and political focus was distinct, too, from surrealism and the Theatre of Cruelty, as developed in the writings and dramaturgy of Antonin Artaud, who sought to affect audiences viscerally, psychologically, physically, and irrationally. While both produced 'shock' in the audience, epic theatre practices would also include a subsequent moment of understanding and comprehension.

== Techniques ==
=== Verfremdungseffekt... ===
While not invented by Brecht, the Verfremdungseffekt, known in English as the "estrangement effect" or the "alienation effect", was made popular by Brecht and is one of the most significant characteristics of epic theatre.

Some of the ways the Verfremdungseffekt can be achieved is by having actors play multiple characters, rearrange the set in full view of the audience, and "break the fourth wall" by speaking to the audience. The use of a narrator in The Caucasian Chalk Circle is another example of Verfremdungseffekt at work. Lighting can also be used to emulate the effect. For example, flooding the theatre with bright lights (not just the stage) and placing lighting equipment on stage can encourage the audience to fully acknowledge that the production is merely a production instead of reality.

As with the principle of dramatic construction involved in the epic form of spoken drama amalgamated or what Brecht calls "non-Aristotelian drama", the epic approach to play production utilizes a montage technique of fragmentation, contrast and contradiction, and interruptions. While the French playwright Jean Genet articulates a very different world view in his dramas from that found in Brecht's, in a letter to the director Roger Blin on the most appropriate approach to staging his The Screens in 1966, he advises an epic approach to its production:

Each scene, and each section within a scene, must be perfected and played as rigorously and with as much discipline as if it were a short play, complete in itself. Without any smudges. And without there being the slightest suggestion that another scene, or section within a scene, is to follow those that have gone before.

=== Historicisation ===
Historicization is also employed in order to draw connections from a historical event to a similar current event. This can be seen in the plays Mother Courage and Her Children and The Good Person of Szechwan, both written by Brecht, which comment on a current social or political issue using historical contexts.

Brecht, too, advised treating each element of a play independently, like a music hall turn that is able to stand on its own. Common production techniques in epic theatre include a simplified, non-realistic scenic design offset against a selective realism in costuming and props, as well as announcements or visual captions that interrupt and summarize the action. Brecht used comedy to distance his audiences from the depicted events and was heavily influenced by musicals and fairground performers, putting music and song in his plays.

Acting in epic theatre requires actors to play characters believably without convincing either the audience or themselves that they have "become" the characters. This is called Gestus when an actor takes on the physical embodiment of a social commentary. Actors frequently address the audience directly out of character ("breaking the fourth wall") and play multiple roles. Brecht thought it was important that the choices the characters made were explicit, and tried to develop a style of acting wherein it was evident that the characters were choosing one action over another. For example, a character could say, "I could have stayed at home, but instead I went to the shops." This he called "fixing the Not / But element".

== Famous practitioners ==
- Erwin Piscator
- Vladimir Mayakovsky
- Vsevolod Meyerhold
- Bertolt Brecht
- Friedrich Dürrenmatt
- Heiner Muller

== See also ==
- 7:84
- Augusto Boal
- Howard Brenton
- Caryl Churchill
- Distancing effect
- David Edgar (playwright)
- Epic Theatre Ensemble
- Experimental theatre
- Dario Fo
- French New Wave
- Gestus
- Joan Littlewood
- John McGrath (playwright)
- Modernism
- Political drama
- Franca Rame
- Theatre of the Oppressed
- Theatre Workshop

== Sources ==
- Gordon, Robert. 2017. "Brecht, interruptions, and epic theatre".
- Brecht, Bertolt. 1949. "A Short Organum for the Theatre". Trans. John Willett. In Brecht (1964, 179–205).
- Brecht, Bertolt. 1964. Brecht on Theatre: The Development of an Aesthetic. Ed. and trans. John Willett. British edition. London: Methuen. ISBN 0-413-38800-X. USA edition. New York: Hill and Wang. ISBN 0-8090-3100-0.
- Brecht, Bertolt. 1965. The Messingkauf Dialogues. Trans. John Willett. Bertolt Brecht: Plays, Poetry, Prose Ser. London: Methuen, 1985. ISBN 0-413-38890-5.
- Genet, Jean. 1966. Letters to Roger Blin. In Reflections on the Theatre and Other Writings. Trans. Richard Seaver. London: Faber, 1972. 7–60. ISBN 0-571-09104-0.
- Innes, Christopher 1972. Erwin Piscator's Political Theatre: The Development of Modern German Drama. New edition. Cambridge: Cambridge UP, 1977. ISBN 0-521-29196-8.
- Wiles, Timothy 1980. The Theatre Event. Chicago: Chicago University Press. ISBN 0-226-89801-6.
- Willett, John. 1964. Editorial notes. In Brecht on Theatre: The Development of an Aesthetic, by Bertolt Brecht. London: Methuen. ISBN 0-413-38800-X. New York: Hill and Wang. ISBN 0-8090-3100-0.
