= Distancing effect =

Theatrical technique

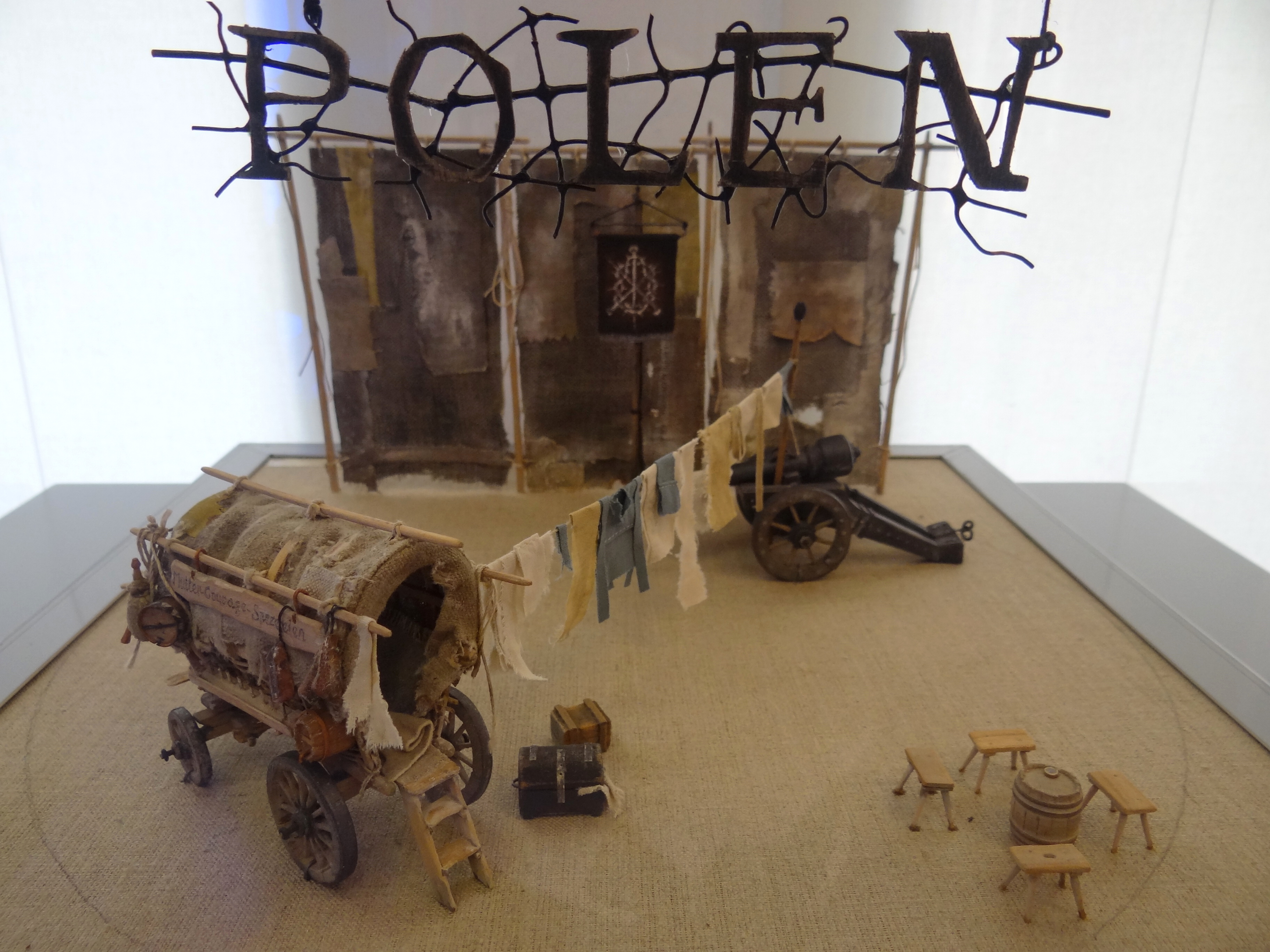
Set design for a production of Brecht's Mother Courage and Her Children, featuring a large scene-setting caption Polen ("Poland") above the stage

The distancing effect, also translated as alienation effect (German: Verfremdungseffekt or V-Effekt), is a concept in performing arts credited to German playwright Bertolt Brecht.

Brecht first used the term in his essay "Alienation Effects in Chinese Acting" published in 1936, in which he described it as performing "in such a way that the audience was hindered from simply identifying itself with the characters in the play. Acceptance or rejection of their actions and utterances was meant to take place on a conscious plane, instead of, as hitherto, in the audience's subconscious".

These remarks find their precedent in an essay largely devoted to the theory of Brecht's "epic theater", "The Author as Producer," written by Walter Benjamin in 1934. This way of formulating the technique would have been familiar to Brecht from his conversations with Benjamin before he met the Russian playwrights Viktor Shklovsky or Sergei Tretyakov (to whom he later attributed the coinage), insofar as Benjamin wrote the essay with the intention of showing it to Brecht when they roomed together at Brecht's cabin in Denmark during their mutual exile in the summer of 1934. In all likelihood Brecht conceals Benjamin's participation in this process due to concerns about the SS at first, and then later on account of his own concerns about the Stasi.

In this article Benjamin speaks of the central formulas: "Epic theater must not develop actions but represent conditions." The use of montage and musical intermissions between action pierces the illusion of the audience's identity with the action, rather than heightening it. Benjamin compares the montage technique to the way that radio programs are broken up by advertisements. "[Epic theater] sets out not to fill the audience with feelings as to alienate the audience in a lasting manner, through thought, from the conditions in which it lives. [This is accomplished by making the audience laugh]."

Epic theater was conceived of as a politically revolutionary form, but when the technique of distancing, estrangement or alienation is adapted to post-revolutionary television shows and other forms we can see it at work in theatrical forms such as the sitcom (where characters are flattened to heighten the relatability of the situation), satirical news or anti-comedy which adopts degraded formats (bad VHS film stock etc.) to heighten comedic effect as in Tim and Eric Awesome Show, Great Job! and other works in the same genre that are themselves precursor forms of the non-linear and drama-independent internet meme humor of Gen-Z.

Even the appropriation of the (initially) revolutionary intentions of the distancing effect for the purposes of profitable enterprises, early remarked by Hannah Arendt, has now been assigned its own technical term: repressive desublimation.

== Origin ==
The term Verfremdungseffekt is rooted in the Russian Formalist notion of the device of making strange (приём остранения priyom ostraneniya), which literary critic Viktor Shklovsky claims is the essence of all art. Lemon and Reis's 1965 English translation of Shklovsky's 1917 coinage as "defamiliarization", combined with John Willett's 1964 translation of Brecht's 1935 coinage as "alienation effect"—and the canonization of both translations in Anglophone literary theory in the decades since—has served to obscure the close connections between the two terms. Not only is the root of both terms "strange" (stran- in Russian, fremd in German), but both terms are unusual in their respective languages: ostranenie is a neologism in Russian, while Verfremdung is a resuscitation of a long-obsolete term in German. In addition, according to some accounts, Shklovsky's Russian friend playwright Sergei Tretyakov taught Shklovsky's term to Brecht during Brecht's visit to Moscow in the spring of 1935. For this reason, many scholars have recently taken to using estrangement to translate both terms: "the estrangement device" in Shklovsky, "the estrangement effect" in Brecht.

It was in any case not long after returning in the spring of 1935 from Moscow, where he saw a command performance of Beijing Opera techniques by Mei Lanfang, that Brecht first used the German term in print to label an approach to theater that discouraged involving the audience in an illusory narrative world and in the emotions of the characters. Brecht thought the audience required an emotional distance to reflect on what was being presented in critical and objective ways, rather than being taken out of themselves as conventional entertainment attempts to do.

The proper English translation of Verfremdungseffekt is a matter of controversy. The word is sometimes rendered as defamiliarization effect, estrangement effect, distantiation, alienation effect, or distancing effect. This has caused some confusion for English scholars who confuse the German word Verfremdung with Entfremdung. In Brecht and Method, Fredric Jameson abbreviates Verfremdungseffekt as "the V-Effekt"; many scholars similarly leave the word untranslated.

Brecht wanted to "distance" or to "alienate" his audience from the characters and the action and, by dint of that, render them observers who would not become involved in or to sympathize emotionally or to empathize by identifying individually with the characters psychologically; rather, he wanted the audience to understand intellectually the characters' dilemmas and the wrongdoing producing these dilemmas exposed in his dramatic plots. By being thus "distanced" emotionally from the characters and the action on stage, the audience could be able to reach such an intellectual level of understanding (or intellectual empathy); in theory, while alienated emotionally from the action and the characters, they would be empowered on an intellectual level both to analyze and perhaps even to try to change the world, which was Brecht's social and political goal as a playwright and the driving force behind his dramaturgy.

== Techniques ==
The distancing effect is achieved by the way the "artist never acts as if there were a fourth wall besides the three surrounding him ... The audience can no longer have the illusion of being the unseen spectator at an event which is really taking place". The use of direct audience-address is one way of disrupting stage illusion and generating the distancing effect. In performance, as the performer "observes himself", his objective is "to appear strange and even surprising to the audience. He achieves this by looking strangely at himself and his work". Whether Brecht intended the distancing effect to refer to the audience or to the actor or to both audience and actor is still controversial among teachers and scholars of "Epic Acting" and Brechtian theatre.

By disclosing and making obvious the manipulative contrivances and "fictive" qualities of the medium, the actors attempt to alienate the viewer from any passive acceptance and enjoyment of the play as mere "entertainment". Instead, the goal is to force viewers into a critical, analytical frame of mind that serves to disabuse them of the notion that what they are watching is necessarily an inviolable, self-contained narrative. This effect of making the familiar strange serves a didactic function insofar as it aims to teach the viewer not to take the style and content for granted, since (proponents argue) the theatrical medium itself is highly constructed and contingent upon many cultural and economic conditions.

It may be noted that Brecht's use of distancing effects in order to prevent audience members from what he characterizes as bathing themselves in empathetic emotions and to draw them into an attitude of critical judgment may lead to reactions other than intellectual coolness. Brecht's popularization of these effects has come to dominate the understanding of its dynamics. But the particulars of a spectator's psyche and of the tension aroused by a specific alienating device may actually increase emotional impact. Audience reactions are rarely uniform, and there are many diverse, sometimes unpredictable, responses that may be achieved through distancing.

Actors, directors, and playwrights may draw on alienating effects in creating a production. The playwright may describe them in the script's stage directions, in effect requiring them in the staging of the work. A director may take a script that has not been written to alienate and introduce certain techniques, such as playing dialogue forward to remind the audience that there is no fourth wall, or guiding the cast to act "in quotation marks". The actor (usually with the director's permission) may play scenes with an ironic subtext. These techniques and many more are available for artists in different aspects of the show. For the playwright, reference to vaudeville or musical revues will often allow rapid segues from empathy to a judgmental attitude through comic distancing. A notable example of such estrangement in an English-language script can be found in Brendan Behan's The Hostage (1958).

== Distancing effects in non-Brechtian performances ==
Brecht's idea of distancing effects has garnered academic interest from a number of researchers in various non-Brechtian performances. Although the term "distancing effect" was first coined by Brecht, the concept has appeared before his usage. Among some notable studies on distancing effects in non-Brechtian performances are: ta'ziyeh (Shi'ite ritualistic passion play) (Mohd Nasir et al., 2020), Marathi theatre (Mujumdar, 2013), Swang theatre (ancient Indian folk theatre) (Sharma & Kashyap, 2018), beat poetry (Rissover, 2009), Likay (Thai folk theatre) (Tungtang, 2015), and Quranic narratives (Dina, 2014).

Rissover's paper discusses the integration of twenty poems (which were either excerpted or taken as whole) by nine Beat poets into the performance of Edward Albee's The American Dream. While Rissover does not exclusively consider distancing effects of Beat Poetry as a poetry performance, the paper still demonstrates how beat poetry is able to project distancing effects to the audience.

Additionally, Mujumdar's paper (2013) examined the elements of epic drama (which includes distancing effects) in Tamasha, a traditional form of Marathi theatre. Mujumdar argues that distancing effects have already been present in Tamasha; albeit the concept itself has yet been conceptualized or coined during the 18th century (i.e. the time whereby Tamasha was considered as the popular folk arts). Through songs, narratives, dances, music, and commentaries that are embedded within Tamasha, the audience is said to be unconsciously performing a social role and achieving the distancing effects advocated by Brecht.

Furthermore, Paradee's (2015) article emphasized that the extensive use of the Verfremdungseffekt (the V-effect) or "alienation effect" can be found commonly in Thai Likay theatre. Even though Likay is performed in a way which could be perceived as evoking Brecht's alienation effect, Brechtian acting troupes and Thai Likay troupes approaches are distinctly different. While the goal for Brecht's alienation effect in the western theatre is to make the audience always aware that they are watching a play, and not being "taken out of themselves" and thus not being distracted from the main meaning of the story, Thai Likay aims to do otherwise.

== See also ==
- Mooreeffoc
- Theatre of the Absurd
- Metafiction
