= 31st Tony Awards =

1977 US theatrical awards ceremony

- Date: June 5, 1977
- Location: Shubert Theatre, New York City, New York
- Hosted by: Jack Albertson, Beatrice Arthur, Buddy Ebsen, Damon Evans, Jean Stapleton, and Leslie Uggams
- Most wins: Annie (7)
- Most nominations: Annie (10)

Television/radio coverage
- Network: ABC

The 31st Annual Tony Awards was broadcast by ABC television on June 5, 1977, from the Shubert Theatre in New York City.

== Eligibility ==
Shows that opened on Broadway during the 1976–1977 season before May 22, 1977 are eligible.

Original plays

- American Buffalo
- The Basic Training of Pavlo Hummel
- The Belle of Amherst
- Best Friend
- California Suite
- Checking Out
- Comedians
- Days in the Trees
- Dirty Linen and New-Found-Land
- The Eccentricities of a Nightingale
- For Colored Girls Who Have Considered Suicide / When the Rainbow Is Enuf
- Gemini
- I Have a Dream
- Herzl
- Ladies at the Alamo
- Legend
- No Man's Land
- Otherwise Engaged
- Piaf...A Remembrance
- Poor Murderer
- The Runner Stumbles
- The Shadow Box
- Sly Fox
- Something Old, Something New
- Streamers
- A Texas Trilogy
- The Trip Back Down
- Unexpected Guests
- Vieux Carré
- Wheelbarrow Closers

Original musicals

- Annie
- Don't Step on My Olive Branch
- Godspell
- Happy End
- I Love My Wife
- Ipi Tombi
- Music Is
- Rex
- Side by Side by Sondheim
- 1600 Pennsylvania Avenue
- So Long, 174th Street
- Something's Afoot
- Your Arms Too Short to Box with God

Play revivals

- Agamemnon
- Anna Christie
- Boy Meets Girl
- Caesar and Cleopatra
- The Cherry Orchard
- The Heiress
- The Innocents
- Mark Twain Tonight!
- Medea
- The Night of the Iguana
- Oedipus Rex
- Romeo and Juliet
- Secret Service
- Who's Afraid of Virginia Woolf?

Musical revivals

- Fiddler on the Roof
- Going Up
- Guys and Dolls
- H.M.S. Pinafore
- The King and I
- The Mikado
- Oh! Calcutta!
- Pal Joey
- A Party with Betty Comden & Adolph Green
- The Pirates of Penzance
- Porgy and Bess
- The Robber Bridegroom
- The Threepenny Opera

== The ceremony ==
Hosts-Performers-Presenters were Jack Albertson, Beatrice Arthur, Buddy Ebsen, Damon Evans, Jean Stapleton, and Leslie Uggams. Additional presenters-performers were Diana Ross, Jane Alexander, Alan Arkin, Lauren Bacall, Valerie Harper, Barry Manilow, Robert Preston, Tony Randall, and Lily Tomlin.

The theme of the show was survival; each host performed a solo, with songs of determination and perseverance, including "I'm Still Here", "Before the Parade Passes By", "Don't Rain On My Parade", "September Song", "You'll Never Walk Alone", "New York City Rhythm", "Climb Ev'ry Mountain" and "Being Alive".

Musicals represented:

- Annie ("You're Never Fully Dressed Without A Smile"/"Easy Street"/"Tomorrow" - Andrea McArdle, Dorothy Loudon and Company)
- Happy End ("Bilbao Song" - Company)
- I Love My Wife ("I Love My Wife"/"Married Couple Seeks Married Couple"/"Hey There, Good Times" - Company)
- Side by Side by Sondheim ("I'm Still Here" - Millicent Martin)

== Winners and nominees ==
Winners are in bold

Best Play	Best Musical
**The Shadow Box – Michael Cristofer**; For Colored Girls Who Have Considered Suicide / When the Rainbow Is Enuf – Ntozake Shange; Otherwise Engaged – Simon Gray; Streamers – David Rabe	**Annie**; Happy End; I Love My Wife; Side by Side by Sondheim
Most Innovative Production of a Revival	Best Book of a Musical
**Porgy and Bess**; Guys and Dolls; The Cherry Orchard; The Threepenny Opera	**Thomas Meehan – Annie**; Elisabeth Hauptmann – Happy End; Michael Stewart – I Love My Wife; Vinnette Carroll – Your Arms Too Short to Box with God
Best Performance by a Leading Actor in a Play	Best Performance by a Leading Actress in a Play
**Al Pacino – The Basic Training of Pavlo Hummel as Pavlo Hummel**; Tom Courtenay – Otherwise Engaged as Simon; Ben Gazzara – Who's Afraid of Virginia Woolf? as George; Ralph Richardson – No Man's Land as Hirst	**Julie Harris – The Belle of Amherst as Various Characters**; Colleen Dewhurst – Who's Afraid of Virginia Woolf? as Martha; Liv Ullmann – Anna Christie as Anna Christopherson; Irene Worth – The Cherry Orchard as Ranevskaya
Best Performance by a Leading Actor in a Musical	Best Performance by a Leading Actress in a Musical
**Barry Bostwick – The Robber Bridegroom as Jamie Lockhart**; Robert Guillaume – Guys and Dolls as Nathan Detroit; Raul Julia – The Threepenny Opera as Macheath; Reid Shelton – Annie as Oliver Warbucks	**Dorothy Loudon – Annie as Miss Hannigan**; Clamma Dale – Porgy and Bess as Bess; Ernestine Jackson – Guys and Dolls as Sarah Brown; Andrea McArdle – Annie as Annie
Best Performance by a Featured Actor in a Play	Best Performance by a Featured Actress in a Play
**Jonathan Pryce – Comedians as Gethin Price**; Bob Dishy – Sly Fox as Abner Truckle; Joe Fields – The Basic Training of Pavlo Hummel as First Sergeant Tower; Laurence Luckinbill – The Shadow Box as Brian	**Trazana Beverley – For Colored Girls Who Have Considered Suicide / When the Rainbow Is Enuf as Lady in Red**; Patricia Elliott – The Shadow Box as Beverly; Rose Gregorio – The Shadow Box as Agnes; Mary McCarty – Anna Christie as Marthy Owen
Best Performance by a Featured Actor in a Musical	Best Performance by a Featured Actress in a Musical
**Lenny Baker – I Love My Wife as Alvin**; David Kernan – Side by Side by Sondheim as Performer; Larry Marshall – Porgy and Bess as Sportin' Life; Ned Sherrin – Side by Side by Sondheim as Performer	**Delores Hall – Your Arms Too Short to Box with God as Various Characters**; Ellen Greene – The Threepenny Opera as Jenny Diver; Millicent Martin – Side by Side by Sondheim as Performer; Julia McKenzie – Side by Side by Sondheim as Performer
Best Direction of a Play	Best Direction of a Musical
**Gordon Davidson – The Shadow Box**; Ulu Grosbard – American Buffalo; Mike Nichols – Comedians; Mike Nichols – Streamers	**Gene Saks – I Love My Wife**; Vinnette Carroll – Your Arms Too Short to Box with God; Martin Charnin – Annie; Jack O'Brien – Porgy and Bess
Best Original Score (Music and/or Lyrics) Written for the Theatre	Best Choreography
**Annie – Charles Strouse (music) and Martin Charnin (lyrics)**; Godspell – Stephen Schwartz (music and lyrics); I Love My Wife – Cy Coleman (music) and Michael Stewart (lyrics); Happy End – Kurt Weill (music) and Bertolt Brecht (lyrics)	**Peter Gennaro – Annie**; Talley Beatty – Your Arms Too Short to Box with God; Patricia Birch – Music Is; Onna White – I Love My Wife
Best Scenic Design	Best Costume Design
**David Mitchell – Annie**; Santo Loquasto – American Buffalo; Santo Loquasto – The Cherry Orchard; Robert Randolph – Porgy and Bess	**Theoni V. Aldredge – Annie**; **Santo Loquasto – The Cherry Orchard**; Theoni V. Aldredge – The Threepenny Opera; Nancy Potts – Porgy and Bess
Best Lighting Design
**Jennifer Tipton – The Cherry Orchard**; John Bury – No Man's Land; Pat Collins – The Threepenny Opera; Neil Peter Jampolis – The Innocents

== Special awards ==
- Regional Theatre Award – Mark Taper Forum
- Lawrence Langner Award – Cheryl Crawford
- Lily Tomlin
- Barry Manilow
- Diana Ross for An Evening with Diana Ross
- National Theatre For the Deaf
- Equity Library Theatre

=== Multiple nominations and awards ===
These productions had multiple nominations:

- 10 nominations: Annie
- 6 nominations: I Love My Wife and Porgy and Bess
- 5 nominations: The Cherry Orchard, The Shadow Box, Side by Side by Sondheim and The Threepenny Opera
- 4 nominations: Your Arms Too Short to Box with God
- 3 nominations: Guys and Dolls and Happy End
- 2 nominations: American Buffalo, Anna Christie, The Basic Training of Pavlo Hummel, Comedians, For Colored Girls Who Have Considered Suicide / When the Rainbow Is Enuf, Otherwise Engaged, No Man's Land, Streamers and Who's Afraid of Virginia Woolf?

The following productions received multiple awards.

- 7 wins: Annie
- 2 wins: The Cherry Orchard, I Love My Wife and The Shadow Box

== See also ==
- Drama Desk Awards
- 1977 Laurence Olivier Awards – equivalent awards for West End theatre productions
- Obie Award
- New York Drama Critics' Circle
- Theatre World Award
- Lucille Lortel Awards
