= Imminent, Indeed =

Play adaptation

Imminent, Indeed (or Polly Peachum's Peculiar Penchant for Plosives) is a gothic adaptation of John Gay’s The Beggar’s Opera. Written and directed by Bryn Manion with the assistance of Wendy Remington. Produced by the Creatives and the founding board members of the company of Aisling Arts. This adaptation focuses on Polly Peachum's side of the story and her world as it trips alongside that of Jenny Diver, a new Peachum brother, several comically nefarious underlings, and of course, the ever villainous Henry Macheath (known as "Mack the Knife" in the Bertolt Brecht and Kurt Weill adaptation, The Threepenny Opera).

It was performed by: Christiane Amorosia (Polly), Mike Amato (Mr. Peachum), Berto Colon (Desmond Ditchdigger), Kate Geller (Doll), Karen Grenke (Doll), Heather Helton (Doll), Natalie Pero (Doll), Liza Pross (Doll), Heather Rogers (Snitch), Maria Rusolo (Lucy), Kevin Schwab (Macheath), Sarah Stephens (Jenny), Christopher T. VanDijk (Matthias), and Catherine Wronowski (Snatch).
