= Mack the Knife (1989 film) =

1989 film

- Theatrical release poster
- Directed by: Menahem Golan
- Screenplay by: Menahem Golan
- Based on: The Threepenny Opera by: Bertolt Brecht; Kurt Weill
- Produced by: Stanley Chase
- Starring: Raúl Juliá; Richard Harris; Julia Migenes; Roger Daltrey; Julie Walters; Clive Revill; Erin Donovan; Rachel Robertson
- Cinematography: Elemér Ragályi
- Edited by: Alain Jakubowicz; Henry Richardson
- Music by: Kurt Weill; Dov Seltzer (adaptation)
- Production company: Golan-Globus Productions
- Distributed by: 21st Century Film Corporation
- Release dates: 17 November 1989 (Chicago); 2 February 1990 (United States)
- Running time: 120 minutes
- Countries: Netherlands; Hungary; United States
- Language: English
- Budget: US$9 million

Mack the Knife is a 1989 romantic comedy musical film written and directed by Menahem Golan, a film adaptation of the 1928 Brecht/Weill musical The Threepenny Opera. The film stars Raúl Juliá as Captain Macheath (reprising his Tony-nominated role from Richard Foreman 1974 revival of Opera), Richard Harris as Mr. Peachum, Julia Migenes as Jenny Diver, Julie Walters as Mrs. Peachum, and Roger Daltrey as the Street Singer. Brecht and Weill's score and libretto was adapted by Golan, Marc Blitzstein, and Dov Seltzer.

== Plot ==
In 19th century London, young Polly Peachum falls for the famous womanizing criminal Macheath and they decide to get married, but because of her family's disapproval, her father ("the king of thieves") has Macheath arrested.

== Cast ==
- Raul Julia as Macheath
- Richard Harris as Mr. Peachum
- Julia Migenes as Jenny Diver
- Roger Daltrey as The Street Singer
- Julie Walters as Mrs. Peachum
- Bill Nighy as "Tiger" Brown
- Rachel Robertson as Polly Peachum
- Clive Revill as Matthew "Money Matthew"
- Erin Donovan as Lucy Brown
- Louise Plowright as Dolly
- Elizabeth Seal as Molly
- Chrissie Kendall as Betty
- Mark Northover as Jimmy "Jewels"
- Iain Rogerson as Filch
- Roy Holder as Wally the Weeper
- Clive Mantle as Johnny Ladder
- Russell Gold as Hookfinger Jake
- John Woodnutt as Reverend Kimball
- Steven Law as Sergeant Smith

== Production ==
Juliá reprises the role of Macheath which won him a Tony nomination for a 1976 revival on Broadway. The film shows obvious signs of last minute editing, including several musical numbers that appear on the soundtrack album but are not in the final cut.

== Home media ==
The film has never been released on DVD and as of today, MGM, the current rights holder to the 2nd Century Film Corporation library, has yet to announce any plans for a DVD or Blu-Ray release.
