= The Beggar's Opera (film) =

1953 film by Peter Brook

- Original film poster
- Directed by: Peter Brook
- Written by: Christopher Fry; Denis Cannan
- Based on: The Beggar's Opera (1728 ballad opera) by John Gay
- Produced by: Laurence Olivier; Herbert Wilcox
- Starring: Laurence Olivier; Hugh Griffith; Dorothy Tutin; Stanley Holloway; Daphne Anderson; Athene Seyler
- Cinematography: Guy Green
- Edited by: Reginald Beck
- Music by: John Gay; Johann Christoph Pepusch; Arthur Bliss (adaptation)
- Production company: Herbert Wilcox Productions
- Distributed by: British Lion Films(worldwide)
- Release dates: 9 June 1953 (London); 5 October 1953 (UK)
- Running time: 94 minutes
- Country: United Kingdom
- Language: English
- Budget: £500,000 or £379,697

The Beggar's Opera is a 1953 British historical musical film directed by Peter Brook in his feature directorial debut, based on John Gay's 1728 ballad opera. It stars Laurence Olivier (in his sole musical), Hugh Griffith, Dorothy Tutin, Stanley Holloway, Daphne Anderson and Athene Seyler.

With additional dialogue and lyrics by Christopher Fry, the film expands on some elements in the opera, such as giving Mrs Trapes a larger role and adding dramatic action sequences to Macheath's escape. The framing device is also changed: the Beggar is himself a prisoner in Newgate with the real Macheath, who escapes at the end under cover of the confusion created when the Beggar decides that his fictional Macheath should be reprieved.

The Beggar's Opera was released in the United Kingdom on 5 October 1953 by British Lion Films. It was a financial disappointment on release.

== Plot ==
In the 1700s, a beggar is tossed into London's Newgate jail, along with a pile of papers upon which his unfinished opera is scribbled. The beggar boasts to the other prisoners that his opera, unlike others of the day, is about a real person, the dashing highwayman Captain Macheath, who, dressed in a red coat, holds off the world with a pistol in each hand, seduces women with five notes of a tune, and generally leaps from misfortune. To the beggar's disappointment, the other prisoners point out that his hero Macheath is among them, in irons and behind bars, and Macheath, who is scheduled to be executed the next morning, admits that there is "no arguing with reality." Taking the first page of the opera, Macheath begins singing, and the beggar, encouraged by Macheath's good voice, urges him to continue, until the following story, the beggar's opera, is sung for the prison inmates:

While riding to London, feeling merry and free, Macheath robs a carriage, and steals a kiss and a locket from a maiden. Later, in London, Macheath's wife, Polly Peachum, pines for him. Polly's parents, shopkeepers Mr. Peachum and his wife, are scandalized to learn from their employee Filch that Polly has secretly married the highwayman. To make the best of the situation, as they are always eager to make money, they urge her to lure Macheath into a trap and collect the reward for his capture.

Meanwhile, outside of town, Macheath encounters a carriage ridden by Newgate's jailor Mr. Lockit, Lockit's daughter Lucy and Mrs. Trapes, whom Lockit is wooing. Lucy, who met Macheath when he was once imprisoned, scolds him for taking her virtue without making good on his promise to wed. When Macheath rides off, Mrs. Trapes suggests that Lucy betray him for the reward and give the money to her father.

Later, during a tryst in a hayloft, Polly warns Macheath that her parents are mounting an ambush. Macheath escapes with Polly's help after a swashbuckling fight, then hides in a back room of a tavern, where he is unable to resist socializing with the prostitutes, whom he considers friends. However, prostitute Jenny Diver has been bribed by Peachum and Lockit to betray him, and with the help of her colleagues, Macheath is soon captured.

From his jail cell, Macheath urges Lucy to steal the jail keys and set him free, promising to marry her in return, but then Polly shows up and he is forced to introduce the women to each other. During the night, Lucy steals the keys and releases him, but later Polly sneaks back and, finding Macheath gone from the cell, screams in anguish without thinking, thus drawing attention to his escape. Meanwhile, Macheath disguises himself in the stolen cape and gloves of a lord and slips into a gaming house to avoid making good his promise to unite with Lucy. However, the proprietor recognizes the cape and alerts Lockit and Peachum about the impostor wearing it. Back at the jail, Polly is accused of freeing Macheath and is locked in Lucy's room, where Lucy, after losing track of Macheath, attempts to drug her. When they hear the recaptured Macheath being returned to prison, Lucy and Polly proceed to Macheath's cell and demand that he choose between them. He refuses, as he will soon be hanged and sees no reason to disappoint either of them.

The next morning, riding atop his coffin as it is carted through the streets to the gallows, Macheath waves farewell to the friendly crowd that has gathered to see him off. At the gallows, after kissing both Lucy and Polly goodbye, Macheath is blindfolded and awaits his fate, and the opera comes to its incomplete end.

The real Macheath, who is still in the jail, protests that he should not have to hang twice. After pondering the complaint, the beggar agrees and yells for Macheath's reprieve. The rest of the prisoners join in the chant and mob the turnkey, who comes to investigate the ruckus, allowing Macheath to escape. The highwayman steals a horse from the cart containing his coffin and when safely out of London, sings that his freedom has been returned because of a beggar's opera.

== Cast ==
- Laurence Olivier as Captain Macheath
- Hugh Griffith as The Beggar
- Dorothy Tutin as Polly Peachum
- George Devine as Peachum
- Mary Clare as Mrs. Peachum
- Edward Pryor as Filch
- Athene Seyler as Mrs. Trapes
- Stanley Holloway as Mr. Lockit
- Daphne Anderson as Lucy Lockit
- Eric Pohlmann as Innkeeper
- Yvonne Furneaux as Jenny Diver
- Kenneth Williams as Jack, the Pot Boy
- Sandra Dorne as Sukey Tawdrey
- Laurence Naismith as Matt of the Mint
- Max Brent as the Drunkard
- Mercy Haystead as Dolly Truly
- Patricia Raine as Mrs. Slammekin
- Jocelyn James as Molly Brazen
- Isabel George as Mrs. Vixen
- Helen Christie as Betty Foxey
- Madge Brindley as Gin Seller
- Felix Felton as Governor
- Denis Cannan as John, the Footman
- Margot Grahame as the Actress
- Bombardier Billy Wells as the Hangman
- Eileen Harvey as the Traveller
- Edith Coats as Mrs. Coaxer
- George Rose, John Kidd, Herbert C. Walton, Eugene Leahy, and Edgar Norfolk as the Turnkeys
- Stuart Burge, Cyril Conway, and Gerald Lawson as the Prisoners
- Oliver Hunter and John Baker as the Chairmen

== Production ==
Laurence Olivier received a fee of £50,000, £30,000 of which he deferred because he was interested in working with Peter Brook. While the film was being shot, producer Herbert Wilcox was directing another film, Laughing Anne. Wilcox later wrote that during the film "Larry and I were in complete harmony but we could not get to first base with Peter." He claims Olivier and he constantly offered Brook practical suggestions which were ignored. Olivier was injured during filming performing a stunt. This caused insurance dramas and Wilcox had to pay £31,000 out of his own pocket. Wilcox's fee was £50,000, £30,000 of which was deferred. Alexander Korda provided finance for foreign rights. The film was sold to Jack Warner for $700,000 - who bought it without seeing it - so Korda made a profit but Olivier and Wilcox did not receive their deferred payment.

It was shot at Shepperton Studios outside London. The film's sets were designed by the art director William C. Andrews while Georges Wakhévitch was the costume designer on the production.

=== Music ===
Most of the cast's singing voices were dubbed by professional opera singers, with the exception of Olivier and Holloway, who provided their own singing. The principal male parts were dubbed by Bruce Boyce and John Cameron, while the female parts were dubbed by Adele Leigh, Jennifer Vyvyan, Joan Cross, and Edith Coats (the latter also appears on-screen as Mrs. Coaxer).

Muir Mathieson was the musical director.

== Reception ==
The film was a financial disappointment on release.
