= The Threepenny Opera =

1928 German play with music

Die Dreigroschenoper The Threepenny Opera
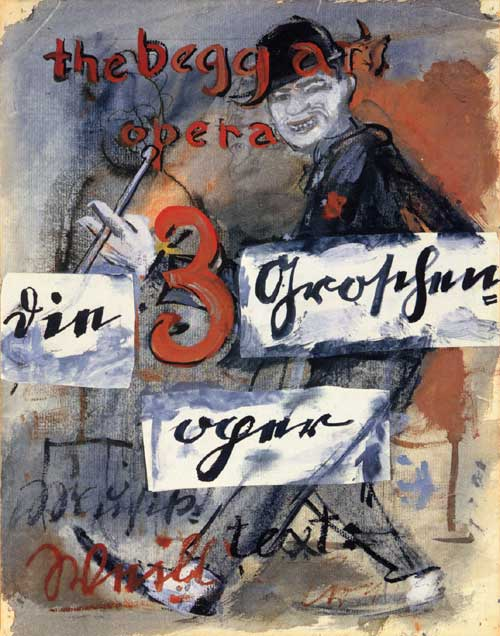
- Original German poster from Berlin, 1928
- Music: Kurt Weill
- Lyrics: Bertolt Brecht; François Villon, translated by K. L. Ammer
- Book: Bertolt Brecht; Elisabeth Hauptmann
- Basis: The Beggar's Opera by John Gay, translated by Elisabeth Hauptmann
- Premiere: 31 August 1928: Theater am Schiffbauerdamm, Berlin

The Threepenny Opera (Note: The word "threepenny" refers to a coin in Britain's pre-decimal currency, which was discontinued in 1971 after the decimalization of sterling.) (Die Dreigroschenoper [diː dʁaɪˈɡʁɔʃn̩ˌʔoːpɐ]) is a 1928 German "play with music." Kurt Weill wrote the music, while the libretto by Bertolt Brecht and Elisabeth Hauptmann was adapted from Hauptmann's translation of John Gay's 18th-century English ballad opera The Beggar's Opera. The libretto also incorporates four ballads by François Villon. Although the first edition of the work credits Hauptmann only as the translator of the source material, in 1955 Brecht acknowledged that she had been had been a full partner in the creation of the play, stating that "The ongoing work with Weill and Elisabeth Hauptmann was a true collaboration that progressed step by step."

The work offers a socialist critique of the capitalist world. It opened on 31 August 1928 at Berlin's Theater am Schiffbauerdamm.

With influences from jazz and German dance music, songs from The Threepenny Opera have been widely covered and become standards, most notably "Die Moritat von Mackie Messer" ("The Ballad of Mack the Knife") and "Seeräuberjenny" ("Pirate Jenny").

The Threepenny Opera has been performed in the United Kingdom, the United States, France, Russia, Italy, and Hungary. It has also been adapted to film and radio. The German-language version from 1928 entered the public domain in the United States in 2024.

== Background ==
=== Origins ===
In the winter of 1927–28, Elisabeth Hauptmann, Brecht's collaborator at the time, received a copy of Gay's play from friends in England and, fascinated by the female characters and its critique of the condition of the London poor, began translating it into German. Brecht at first took little interest in her translation project, but in April 1928 he attempted to interest the impresario Ernst Josef Aufricht in a play he was writing called Fleischhacker, which he had, in fact, already promised to another producer. Aufricht was seeking a production to launch his new theatre company at the Theater am Schiffbauerdamm in Berlin, but was not impressed by the sound of Fleischhacker. Brecht immediately proposed a translation of The Beggar's Opera instead, claiming that he himself had been translating it. He delivered Hauptmann's translation to Aufricht, who immediately signed a contract for it. Brecht proposed Weill to write the music, and the two of them worked with Hauptmann to create the work over the next few months.

Brecht used four songs by the French poet François Villon. Rather than translate the French himself, he used the translations by K. L. Ammer (Karl Anton Klammer), the same source he had been using since his earliest plays.

The first act of both works begins with the same melody ("Peachum's Morning Chorale"/"An Old Woman Clothed In Gray"), but that is the only material Weill borrowed from the melodies Johann Christoph Pepusch arranged for The Beggar's Opera. The title Die Dreigroschenoper was determined only a week before the opening; it had been previously announced as simply The Beggar's Opera (in English), with the subtitle "Die Luden-Oper" ("The Pimp's Opera").

Writing in 1929, Weill made the political and artistic intents of the work clear:

With the Dreigroschenoper we reach a public which either did not know us at all or thought us incapable of captivating listeners ... Opera was founded as an aristocratic form of art ... If the framework of opera is unable to withstand the impact of the age, then this framework must be destroyed ... In the Dreigroschenoper, reconstruction was possible insofar as here we had a chance of starting from scratch.

Weill claimed at the time that "music cannot further the action of the play or create its background", but achieves its proper value when it interrupts the action at the right moments."

=== Music ===
Weill's score shows the influence of jazz and German dance music of the time. The orchestration involves a small ensemble with a good deal of doubling-up on instruments (in the original performances, for example, some 7 players covered a total of 23 instrumental parts, though modern performances typically use a few more players).

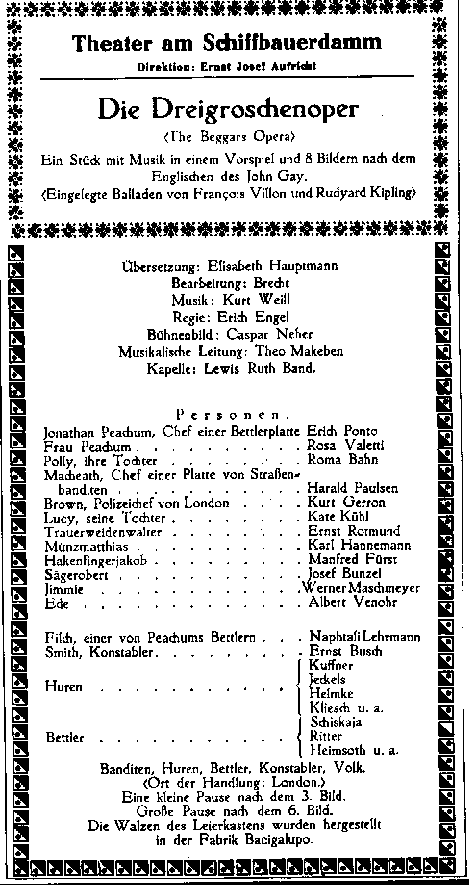
Playbill of the premiere performance at Theater am Schiffbauerdamm Berlin, 31 August 1928. The name of Lotte Lenya, who played Jenny, was omitted by mistake.

== Premieres ==
=== Germany ===
The Threepenny Opera was first performed at the Theater am Schiffbauerdamm in 1928 on a set designed by Caspar Neher. Despite an initially poor reception, it became a great success, playing 400 times in the next two years. The performance was a springboard for one of the best known interpreters of Brecht and Weill's work, Lotte Lenya, who was married to Weill. The production became a great favourite of Berlin's "smart set" – Count Harry Kessler recorded in his diary meeting at the performance an ambassador and a director of the Dresdner Bank (and their wives), and concluded "One simply has to have been there."

Critics did not fail to notice that Brecht had included the four Villon songs translated by Ammer. Brecht responded by saying that he had "a fundamental laxity in questions of literary property."

By 1933, when Weill and Brecht were forced to leave Germany by the Nazi seizure of power, the play had been translated into 18 languages and performed more than 10,000 times on European stages.

=== France ===
A French version produced by Gaston Baty and written by Ninon Steinhof and André Mauprey was presented in October 1930 at the Théâtre Montparnasse in Paris. It was rendered as L'Opéra de quat'sous; (quatre sous, or four pennies being the idiomatically equivalent French expression for Threepenny).

=== Russia ===
In 1930 the work premiered in Moscow at the Kamerny Theatre, directed by Alexander Tairov. It was the only one of Brecht's works to be performed in Russia during his lifetime. Izvestia disapproved: "It is high time that our theatres ceased playing homage to petit-bourgeois bad taste and instead turned to more relevant themes."

=== Hungary ===
The first Hungarian performance of the play was at the Comedy Theatre of Budapest (Vígszínház), on 6 September 1930. It was titled A koldus operája, which is a reference to Gay's original opera. The play was translated by Jenő Heltai, who mixed Weill and Pepusch' s music, and also Brecht and Gay's texts. The director was Ernő Szabolcs. The cast included Pál Jávor (Mackie), Franciska Gaal (Polly), Gerő Mály (Peachum) and Ella Gombaszögi (Mrs Peachum).

=== United States ===
America was introduced to the work by the film version of G. W. Pabst, which opened in New York in 1931.

The first American production, adapted into English by Gifford Cochran and Jerrold Krimsky and staged by Francesco von Mendelssohn, featured Robert Chisholm as Macheath. It opened on Broadway at the Empire Theatre, on April 13, 1933, and closed after 12 performances. Mixed reviews praised the music but slammed the production, with the critic Gilbert Gabriel calling it "a dreary enigma".

=== United Kingdom ===
In the United Kingdom, the first fully staged performance was given on 9 February 1956, under Berthold Goldschmidt, although there had been a concert performance in 1933, and a semi-staged performance on 28 July 1938. In between, on 8 February 1935 Edward Clark conducted the first British broadcast of the work. It received scathing reviews from Ernest Newman and other critics. But the most savage criticism came from Weill himself, who described it privately as "the worst performance imaginable … the whole thing was completely misunderstood". But his criticisms seem to have been for the concept of the piece as a Germanised version of The Beggar's Opera, rather than for Clark's conducting of it, of which Weill made no mention.

=== Italy ===
The first Italian production, titled L'opera da tre soldi and directed by Giorgio Strehler, premiered at the Piccolo Teatro in Milan on 27 February 1956 in the presence of Bertolt Brecht. The cast included: Tino Carraro (Mackie), Mario Carotenuto (Peachum), Marina Bonfigli (Polly), Milly (Jenny), Enzo Tarascio (Chief of Police). The conductor was Bruno Maderna. Set designs were by Luciano Damiani and Teo Otto; costume design by Ezio Frigerio.

== Roles ==
Roles, voice types, premiere cast
| Role | Voice type | Premiere cast, 31 August 1928 Conductor: Theo Mackeben |
|---|---|---|
| Macheath ("Mackie Messer"/"Mack the Knife"), London's greatest and most notorious criminal | tenor/baritone | Harald Paulsen |
| Jonathan Jeremiah Peachum, the "Beggar's Friend", controller of all the beggars in London; conspires to have Mack hanged | baritone | Erich Ponto |
| Celia Peachum ("Frau Peachum"), Peachum's wife; helps him run the business | mezzo-soprano | Rosa Valetti |
| Polly Peachum, the Peachums' daughter; after knowing Mack for only five days, agrees to marry him | soprano | Roma Bahn |
| Jackie "Tiger" Brown, Police Chief of London and Mack's best friend from their army days | baritone | Kurt Gerron |
| Lucy Brown, Tiger Brown's daughter; claims to be married to Mack | soprano | Kate Kühl |
| Jenny ("Spelunken-Jenny"/"Low-Dive Jenny"/"Ginny Jenny"), a prostitute once romantically involved with Macheath; is bribed to turn Mack over to the police | mezzo-soprano | Lotte Lenya |
| Filch, a misfit young man who approaches the Peachums in hopes of beggar training | tenor | Naphtali Lehrmann |
| Street Singer ("Moritatensänger"), sings 'The Ballad of Mack the Knife' in the opening scene | baritone | Kurt Gerron |
| Smith, a constable | baritone | Ernst Busch |
| Walter | tenor | Ernst Rotmund |
| Matthias | tenor | Karl Hannemann |
| Jakob | tenor | Manfred Fürst |
| Jimmie | tenor | Werner Maschmeyer |
| Ede | tenor | Albert Venohr |
Beggars, gangsters, whores, constables

== Casts (1920s–1960s) ==
| Character | Original Berlin production | Film version | Original Broadway production | Theatre de Lys revival | Off-Broadway revival | Original West End production | US national tour | Paper Mill Playhouse production | US national tour | Film version | New York City Opera production | Mineola Theatre production | Broadway revival | Arena Stage production | Williamstown Theatre Festival production |
| Character | 1928 | 1931 | 1933 | 1954 | 1955–1961 | 1956 | 1960 | 1961 | | 1963 | 1965 | 1966 | | 1968 | 1969 |
|---|---|---|---|---|---|---|---|---|---|---|---|---|---|---|---|
| Macheath ("Mackie Messer"/"Mack the Knife") | Harald Paulsen | Rudolf Forster | Robert Chisholm | Scott Merrill | Scott Merrill | Bill Owen | Scott Merrill | Scott Merrill | Scott Merrill | Curd Jürgens | Kurt Kasznar | James Mitchell | Per Nielsen Göran Graffman (voice) | Hugh Hurd | Charles Siebert |
| Jonathan Jeremiah Peachum | Erich Ponto | Fritz Rasp | Rex Weber | Leon Lishner | Frederic Downs | Eric Pohlmann | Frederic Downs | Mitchell Jason | Mitchell Jason | Gert Fröbe | Stefan Schnabel | Edwin Steffe | Ulf Hakan Jansson Ingvar Kjellson (voice) | Robert Van Hooten | Louis Beachner |
| Celia Peachum ("Frau Peachum") | Rosa Valetti | Valeska Gert | Evelyn Beresford | Charlotte Rae | Jane Connell | Lisa Lee | Estelle Parsons | Jane Connell | Jane Connell | Hilde Hildebrand | Lilia Skala | Maggie Task | Zanza Lidums Ulla Sjöblom (voice) | Marcie Hubert | Peggy Pope |
| Polly Peachum | Roma Bahn | Carola Neher | Steffi Duna | Jo Sullivan Loesser | Jo Sullivan Loesser | Daphne Anderson | Jo Wilder | Didi Van Eyck | Didi Van Eyck | June Ritchie | Anita Höfer | Gail Johnston | Ellika Linden Helena Brodin (voice) | Laura Campbell | Elinor Ellsworth |
| Jackie "Tiger" Brown | Kurt Gerron | Reinhold Schünzel | Rex Evans | George Tyne | Richard Verney | George A. Cooper | Richard Verney | Richard Verney | Richard Verney | Lino Ventura | Ralph Herbert | Edward Grover | Arne Hogsander Jan Blomberg (voice) | Robert Prosky | Tony Capodilupo |
| Lucy Brown | Kate Kühl | —N/a | Josephine Huston | Bea Arthur | Bea Arthur | Georgia Brown | Grace Lee Whitney | Buzz Halliday | Buzz Halliday | Marlene Warrlich | Marion Brash | Barbara Cason | Lydia de Lind van Winjngaarden Meta Velander (voice) | Dimitra Arliss | Nancy Kenestrick |
| Jenny Diver ("Spelunken-Jenny"/"Low-Dive Jenny"/"Ginny Jenny") | Lotte Lenya | Lotte Lenya | Marjorie Dille | Lotte Lenya | Lotte Lenya | Maria Remusat | Anna Sten | Christiane Felsmann | Gypsy Rose Lee | Hildegard Knef | Martha Schlamme | Chita Rivera | Ellika Linden Ulla Sjöblom (voice) | Cynthia McPherson | Joyce Ebert |
| Charles Filch | Naphtali Lehrmann | Herbert Grünbaum | Herbert Rudley | William Duell | William Duell | Victor Baring | —N/a | Leonard Rogel | Leonard Rogel | Walter Giller | Mathew Anden | Rudy Tronto | Arne Hogsander Haken Sarner (voice) | Ronny Cox | Austin Pendleton |
| The Street Singer ("Moritatensänger") | Kurt Gerron | Ernst Busch | George Heller | Gerald Price | Tige Andrews | Ewan MacColl | Tige Andrews | Bob Brooks | —N/a | Sammy Davis Jr. | George S. Irving | —N/a | Arne Hogsander Haken Sarner (voice) | Richard Bauer | Austin Pendleton |
| Smith | Ernst Busch | Vladimir Sokoloff | Gerald Hamer | Rome Smith | Rome Smith | Charles Stanley | —N/a | G. Kennedy Osborn | G. Kennedy Osborn | Hans W. Hamacher | David Smith | Rod Browning | Arne Hogsander | Howard Witt | Stephen Mendillo |
| Walt Dreary | Ernst Rotmund | —N/a | Harry Bellaver | Paul Dooley | Joseph Elic | Charles Hill | Joseph Elic | Herb Edelman | Herb Edelman | Martin Berliner | Paul Andor | Dominic Chianese | Michael Meschke | Garrett Saunders | Richard Masur |
| Matt of the Mint | Karl Hannemann | —N/a | Anthony Blair | John Astin | John Astin | George Murcell | Len Lesser | Henry Howard | Henry Howard | Siegfried Wischnewski | John Garson | William J. Coppola | Jan Blomberg | Ned Beatty | David Ackroyd |
| Crook-Finger Jack | Manfred Fürst | —N/a | Burgess Meredith | Joseph Beruh | Eddie Lawrence | Warren Mitchell | —N/a | Marty Greene | Marty Greene | Walter Feuchtenberg | Sol Frieder | Louis Guss | Heinz Spira | Jay Fletcher | Ashton Crosby |
| Jimmy | Werner Maschmeyer | —N/a | Francis Kennelly | —N/a | —N/a | —N/a | —N/a | —N/a | —N/a | Stefan Wigger | Curt Lowens | —N/a | —N/a | —N/a | —N/a |
| Sawtooth Bob | Albert Venohr | —N/a | George Heller | Bernard Bogin | Bernie Fein | George Tovey | —N/a | Jack Whalen | Jack Whalen | Max Strassberg | Michael Haeusserman | Rod Browning | Folke Tragardh | Michael Procaccino | Stan Wiklinski |
| Reverend Kimball | —N/a | —N/a | John Connolly | Donald Elson | Carroll Saint | Roland Randel | Donald Elson | Everett Fisch | Everett Fisch | Henning Schlüter | Henry Cordy | Charles Goff | —N/a | Morris Engle | Robert Foster |

=== Notable replacements ===
==== Original Berlin production (1928) ====
- Macheath: Hermann Thimig
- Polly Peachum: Carola Neher, Hilde Körber

==== Off-Broadway revival (1955–1961) ====
- Macheath: James Mitchell, Tige Andrews, David Atkinson, Jerry Orbach
- Jonathan Jeremiah Peachum: Emile Renan, Leon Janney, Ed Asner
- Celia Peachum: Pert Kelton, Nancy Andrews, Madeline Lee, Lu Leonard, Estelle Parsons
- Polly Peachum: Paula Stewart, Elizabeth Hubbard, Cherry Davis
- Jackie "Tiger" Brown: Carmen Capalbo
- Lucy Brown: Mary Louise Wilson, Georgia Brown
- Jenny Diver: Grete Mosheim, Katharine Sergava, Dolly Haas, Valerie Bettis, Marion Brash
- The Street Singer: Jerry Orbach
- Smith: Stefan Gierasch, James Luisi, Noam Pitlik, Jerry Orbach
- Walter: Noam Pitlik
- Matthias: Noam Pitlik
- Jakob: Jerry Stiller
- Jimmie: Buck Kartalian, Joseph Mascolo, Ed Asner, Frank Perry, Tony Lo Bianco

==== US National Tour (1960) ====
- Jenny Diver: Lotte Lenya

== Casts (1970s–1990s) ==
| Character | West End revival | Boston production | Williamstown Theatre Festival production | Broadway revival | Delacorte Theater production | Kitty Carlisle Hart Theater production | Royal National Theatre production | Film version | Broadway revival | West End revival | Reprise Theatre Company production | ACT production |
| Character | 1972 | 1974 | | 1976–1977 | 1977 | 1984 | 1986 | 1989 | | 1994–1995 | 1998 | 1999 |
|---|---|---|---|---|---|---|---|---|---|---|---|---|
| Macheath ("Mackie Messer"/"Mack the Knife") | Joe Melia | Christopher Reeve | Raul Julia | Raul Julia | Philip Bosco | Tom Pletto | Tim Curry | Raul Julia | Sting | Tom Hollander | Patrick Cassidy | Philip Casnoff |
| Jonathan Jeremiah Peachum | Ronald Radd | Colgate Salsbury | Louis Beachner | C. K. Alexander | Jerome Dempsey | Joel Aroeste | Stephen Moore | Richard Harris | Alvin Epstein | Tom Mannion | Theodore Bikel | Steven Anthony Jones |
| Celia Peachum ("Frau Peachum") | Hermione Baddeley | Margo Martindale | Peggy Pope | Elizabeth Wilson | Gretel Cummings | Carole Edie Smith | Sara Kestelman | Julie Walters | Georgia Brown | Beverley Klein | Marilyn Lovell Matz | Nancy Dussault |
| Polly Peachum | Vanessa Redgrave | Jessica Richman | JoBeth Williams | Caroline Kava | Caroline Kava | Helena Binder | Sally Dexter | Rachel Robertson | Maureen McGovern | Sharon Small | Marguerite MacIntyre | Anika Noni Rose |
| Jackie "Tiger" Brown | Dan Meaden | Patrick Clear | David Ford | David Sabin | David Sabin | David Pursley | Niall Buggy | Bill Nighy | Larry Marshall | Simon Dormandy | George McDaniel | Charles Lanyer |
| Lucy Brown | Barbara Windsor | Cynthia Dickason | Donna McKechnie | Blair Brown | Penelope Bodry | —N/a | Joanna Foster | Erin Donovan | Kim Criswell | Natasha Bain | Carrie Hamilton | Lisa Vroman |
| Jenny Diver ("Spelunken-Jenny"/"Low-Dive Jenny"/"Ginny Jenny") | Annie Ross | Tiina Cartmell | Virginia Vestoff | Ellen Greene | Ellen Greene | Lynnie Godfrey | Eve Adam | Julia Migenes | Suzzanne Douglas | Tara Hugo | Jonelle Allen | Bebe Neuwirth |
| Charles Filch | Henry Woolf | Michael Toumanoff | Austin Pendleton | Ed Zang | Ed Zang | —N/a | Neil Daglish | Iain Rogerson | Jeff Blumenkrantz | Ben Albu | Jeremy Lawrence | Chris Ferry |
| The Street Singer ("Moritatensänger") | Lon Satton | Scott Taylor | Austin Pendleton | Roy Brocksmith | Roy Brocksmith | —N/a | Basil Henson | Roger Daltrey | Ethyl Eichelberger | —N/a | Ken Page | Tom Blair |
| Smith | Kevin Flood | Frederic Serino | Jack Milton | Glenn Kezer | Marc Jordan | —N/a | Paul Stewart | Steven Law | David Pursley | Terence Maynard | Hal Robinson | Charles Lanyer |
| Walt Dreary | Declan Mulholland | Spiro Veloudos | John Basil | Max Gulack | John Ridge | —N/a | Basil Henson | Roy Holder | Tom Robbins | Terence Maynard | Matthew Kimbrough | Patrick P. McNulty |
| Matt of the Mint | Victor Maddern | Jonathan Frakes | Marty Bell | Ralph Drischell | Ralph Drischell | Gary O. Aldrich | Barry James | Clive Revill | Josh Mostel | Simon Walter | Michael G. Hawkins | Brian Keith Russell |
| Crook-Finger Jack | Arthur Mullard | John Caron | Stuart Ross | William Duell | William Duell | —N/a | Michael Bryant | Russell Gold | Mitchell Greenberg | Jeremy Harrison | Philip Watt | Zachary Knower |
| Jimmy | —N/a | —N/a | —N/a | Robert Schlee | Robert Schlee | —N/a | Martin Howells | Mark Northover | Alex Santoriello | Ben Albu | —N/a | —N/a |
| Sawtooth Bob | John Hartley | Patrick Young | Purcell McKamey | K. C. Wilson | K. C. Wilson | —N/a | Paul Stewart | Clive Mantle | David Schechter | —N/a | Sean Smith | Randall Gremillion |
| Reverend Kimball | Derry Power | David Aston-Reese | Emery Battis | Rik Colitti | Paul Ukena, Jr. | —N/a | Alan Haywood | John Woodnutt | Philip Carroll | Amanda Edwards | Hal Robinson | Dan Hiatt |

=== Notable replacements ===
==== West End revival (1972) ====
- The Street Singer: Norman Beaton

==== Broadway revival (1976–1977) ====
- Macheath: Philip Bosco, Roy Brocksmith, Keith Charles (s/b)
- Charles Filch: Armin Shimerman (u/s)
- The Street Singer: Jack Eric Williams (u/s), Tony Azito (u/s)

==== Broadway revival (1989) ====
- Jenny Diver: Jan Horvath (u/s)

==== ACT production (1999) ====
- Macheath: Malcolm Gets

== Casts (2000s–2020s) ==
| Character | Theatre de Lys revival reunion concert | Williamstown Theatre Festival production | New York reading | Los Angeles revival | Broadway revival | BBC Radio production | Atlantic Theater Company production | Signature Theatre production | Royal National Theatre production | Off-Brand Opera production |
| Character | 2000 | 2003 | 2004 | 2005 | 2006 | 2009 | 2014 | | 2016 | 2026 |
|---|---|---|---|---|---|---|---|---|---|---|
| Macheath ("Mackie Messer"/"Mack the Knife") | Robert Cuccioli | Jesse L. Martin | Alan Cumming | Bjorn Johnson | Alan Cumming | Joseph Millson | Michael Park | Mitchell Jarvis | Rory Kinnear | George Abud |
| Jonathan Jeremiah Peachum | George S. Irving | David Schramm | Wallace Shawn | David Castellani | Jim Dale | Zubin Varla | F. Murray Abraham | Bobby Smith | Nick Holder | Joseph Pyfferoen |
| Celia Peachum ("Frau Peachum") | Charlotte Rae | Randy Graff | Christine Baranski | Pam Heffler | Ana Gasteyer | Ruth Alexander-Rubin | Mary Beth Peil | Donna Migliaccio | Haydn Gwynne | Aline Salloum |
| Polly Peachum | Jo Sullivan Loesser | Melissa Errico | —N/a | Josie Gundy | Nellie McKay | Elen Rhys | Laura Osnes | Erin Driscoll | Rosalie Craig | Barbara Walsh |
| Jackie "Tiger" Brown | —N/a | Jack Willis | —N/a | Joe Hulser | Christopher Innvar | Conrad Nelson | Rick Holmes | John Leslie Wolfe | Peter de Jersey | Mahira Kakkar |
| Lucy Brown | Donna McKechnie | Karen Ziemba | —N/a | Rebecca Metz | Brian Charles Rooney | Rosalie Craig | Lilli Cooper | Rick Hammerly | Debbie Kurup | Mary Testa |
| Jenny Diver ("Spelunken-Jenny"/"Low-Dive Jenny"/"Ginny Jenny") | Bea Arthur | Betty Buckley | Debbie Harry | Tish Hicks | Cyndi Lauper | Ute Gfrerer | Sally Murphy | Natascia Diaz | Sharon Small | Katrina Lenk |
| Charles Filch | William Duell | William Duell | —N/a | Dave Metz | Carlos Leon | Graeme Hawley | John Kelly | Aaron Bliden | Sarah Amankwah | Nicola Vazquez (as Krusti Kristi) |
| The Street Singer ("Moritatensänger") | Charles Abbott | Laurent Giroux | —N/a | Jimmy Kieffer | —N/a | Heinz Karl Gruber | John Kelly | —N/a | George Ikediashi | —N/a |
| Smith | —N/a | Kenneth Garner | —N/a | Aaron Lyons | John Herrera | Peter Edbrook | —N/a | Thomas Adrian Simpson | Matt Cross | Berit Palma (as Stuffy Stevie) |
| Walt Dreary | —N/a | John Ellison Conlee | —N/a | Jimmy Kieffer | Maureen Moore | Declan Wilson | —N/a | Aaron Bliden | Andrew Buckley | Anthime Miller (as Pouty Petey) |
| Matt of the Mint | —N/a | Jim Stanek | —N/a | Will Kepper | David Cale | Kevin Harvey | —N/a | Paul Scanlan | Jamie Beddard | Alexis Papaleo (as Tummy Tommy) |
| Crook-Finger Jack | —N/a | Jack Noseworthy | —N/a | Alex Wright | Adam Alexi-Malle | Sean Oliver | —N/a | Sean Fri | —N/a | —N/a |
| Jimmy | —N/a | —N/a | —N/a | Bruce Dickinson | Brooke Sunny Moriber | Graeme Hawley | —N/a | Jessica Thorne | Hammed Animashaun | Paula Gaudier (as Pam / Young Polly) |
| Sawtooth Bob | —N/a | Julio Monge | —N/a | Aaron Lyons | Romain Frugé | Peter Edbrook | —N/a | Ryan Sellers | Dominic Tighe | —N/a |
| Reverend Kimball | —N/a | Stephen Gabis | —N/a | Maia Madison | Terry Burrell | Zubin Varla | —N/a | Thomas Adrian Simpson | George Ikediashi | —N/a |

=== Notable replacements ===
==== Broadway revival (2006) ====
- Jonathan Jeremiah Peachum: David Cale (u/s)
- Lucy Brown: Lucas Steele (u/s)
- Jenny Diver: Maureen Moore (u/s)
- Charles Filch: Adam Alexi-Malle (u/s)

== Synopsis ==
=== Overview ===
Set in Victorian London, the play focuses on Macheath, an amoral antihero who leads a criminal gang, committing robbery, arson, rape, and murder.

Macheath ("Mackie," or "Mack the Knife") marries Polly Peachum. This displeases her father, who controls the beggars of London, and he endeavours to have Macheath hanged. His attempts are hindered by the fact that the Chief of Police, Tiger Brown, is Macheath's old army comrade. Still, Peachum exerts his influence and eventually gets Macheath arrested and sentenced to hang. Macheath escapes this fate via a deus ex machina moments before the execution when, in an unrestrained parody of a happy ending, a messenger from the Queen arrives to pardon Macheath and grant him the title of baron. The details of the original 1928 text have often been substantially modified in later productions.

A draft narration by Brecht for a concert performance begins: "You are about to hear an opera for beggars. Since this opera was intended to be as splendid as only beggars can imagine, and yet cheap enough for beggars to be able to watch, it is called the Threepenny Opera."

=== Prologue ===
A street singer entertains the crowd with the illustrated murder ballad or Bänkelsang, titled "Die Moritat von Mackie Messer" ("Ballad of Mack the Knife"). As the song concludes, a well-dressed man leaves the crowd and crosses the stage. This is Macheath, alias "Mack the Knife".

=== Act 1 ===
Scene 1: "To combat the increasing callousness of mankind, J. Peachum, a man of business, has opened a shop where the poorest of the poor can acquire an exterior that will touch the hardest of hearts."

The story begins in the shop of Jonathan Jeremiah Peachum, the boss of London's beggars, who outfits and trains the beggars in return for a slice of their takings from begging. In the first scene, the extent of Peachum's iniquity is immediately exposed. Filch, a new beggar, is obliged to bribe his way into the profession and agree to pay over to Peachum 50 percent of whatever he made; the previous day he had been severely beaten up for begging within the area of jurisdiction of Peachum's protection racket.

After finishing with the new man, Peachum becomes aware that his grown daughter Polly did not return home the previous night. Peachum, who sees his daughter as his own private property, concludes that she has become involved with Macheath. This does not suit Peachum at all, and he becomes determined to thwart this relationship and destroy Macheath.

Scene 2: "Deep in the heart of Soho the bandit Mac the Knife is celebrating his marriage to Polly Peachum, the beggar king's daughter."

The scene shifts to an empty stable where Macheath himself is preparing to marry Polly once his gang has stolen and brought all the necessary food and furnishings. No vows are exchanged, but Polly is satisfied, and everyone sits down to a banquet. Since none of the gang members can provide fitting entertainment, Polly gets up and sings "Seeräuberjenny", a revenge fantasy in which she is a scullery maid turning pirate queen to order the execution of her bosses and customers. The gang becomes nervous when the Chief of Police, Tiger Brown, arrives, but it's all part of the act; Brown had served with Mack in England's colonial wars and had intervened on numerous occasions to prevent the arrest of Macheath over the years. The old friends duet in the "Kanonen-Song" ("Cannon Song" or "Army Song").

Scene 3: "For Peachum, conscious of the hardness of the world, the loss of his daughter means utter ruin."

In the next scene, Polly returns home and defiantly announces that she has married Macheath by singing the "Barbarasong" ("Barbara Song"). She stands fast against her parents' anger, but she inadvertently reveals Brown's connections to Macheath which her parents subsequently use to their advantage. She and her parents sing the first finale on the insecurity of the human condition.

=== Act 2 ===
Scene 4: "Thursday afternoon: Mac the Knife takes leave of his wife and flees from his father-in-law to the heaths of Highgate."

Polly warns Macheath that her father will try to have him arrested. He is finally convinced that Peachum has enough influence to do it and makes arrangements to leave London, explaining the details of his bandit "business" to Polly so she can manage it in his absence.

Scene 5: "Before the Coronation bells had died away, Mac the Knife was sitting with the whores of Turnbridge! The whores betray him. It is Thursday evening."

Before he leaves town, he stops at his favorite brothel, where he sees his ex-lover, Jenny. They sing the "Zuhälterballade" ("Pimp's Ballad", one of the Villon songs translated by Ammer) about their days together, but Macheath doesn't know Mrs Peachum has bribed Jenny to turn him in.

Scene 6: "Betrayed by the whores, Macheath is freed from prison by the love of yet another woman."

Despite Brown's apologies, there's nothing he can do, and Macheath is dragged away to jail. After he sings the "Ballade vom angenehmen Leben" ("Ballad of the Pleasant Life"), another Villon/Ammer song, another girlfriend, Lucy (Brown's daughter) and Polly show up at the same time, setting the stage for a nasty argument that builds to the "Eifersuchtsduett" ("Jealousy Duet"). After Polly leaves, Lucy engineers Macheath's escape. When Mr Peachum finds out, he confronts Brown and threatens him, telling him that he will unleash all of his beggars during Queen Victoria's coronation parade, ruining the ceremony and costing Brown his job. Macheath and Mrs Peachum (Jenny in Brecht’s 1931 revision) sing the second finale, which critiques the capitalist system with the motto "food is the first thing, morals follow on" and the refrain, "What Keeps Mankind Alive?".

=== Act 3 ===
Scene 7: "That night Peachum prepares his campaign. He plans to disrupt the Coronation procession by a demonstration of human misery."

Jenny comes to the Peachums' shop to demand her money for the betrayal of Macheath, which Mrs Peachum refuses to pay. Jenny reveals that Macheath is at Suky Tawdry's house. When Brown arrives, determined to arrest Peachum and the beggars, he is horrified to learn that the beggars are already in position on the parade route and only Mr Peachum can stop them. To placate Peachum, Brown's only option is to arrest Macheath and have him executed.

Scene 8: "Friday morning, 5 am. Mac the Knife, who has been with the whores again, has again been betrayed by whores. He is about to be hanged."

In the next scene, Macheath is back in jail and desperately trying to raise a sufficient bribe to get out again, even as the gallows are being assembled.

Soon it becomes clear that neither Polly nor the gang members can, or are willing to, raise any money, and Macheath prepares to die. He laments his fate and poses the 'Marxist' questions: "What's picking a lock compared to buying shares? What's breaking into a bank compared to founding one? What's murdering a man compared to employing one?" (These questions did not appear in the original version of the work, but first appeared in the musical Happy End, another Brecht/Weill/Hauptmann collaboration, in 1929 – they may in fact have been written not by Brecht, but by Hauptmann).

Macheath asks everyone for forgiveness ("Grave Inscription"). Then a sudden and intentionally comical reversal: Peachum announces that in this opera mercy will prevail over justice and that a messenger on horseback will arrive ("Walk to the Gallows"); Brown arrives as that messenger and announces that Macheath has been pardoned by the queen and granted a title, a castle and a pension. The cast then sings the Finale, which ends with a plea that wrongdoing not be punished too harshly as life is harsh enough.

== Musical numbers ==
=== Prelude ===
1. Ouverture
2. Die Moritat von Mackie Messer ("The Ballad of Mack the Knife" – Street singer)

=== Act 1 ===
3. Morgenchoral des Peachum (Peachum's Morning Choral – Peachum, Mrs Peachum)
4. Anstatt-dass-Song (The "Instead of" Song – Peachum, Mrs Peachum)
5. Hochzeits-Lied (Wedding Song – Four Gangsters)
6. Seeräuberjenny (Pirate Jenny – Polly) (Note: In the original version, "Pirate Jenny" is sung by Polly during the wedding scene, but is sometimes moved to the second act and given to Jenny. In the 1956 off-Broadway production starring Lotte Lenya, Polly sang a version of the "Bilbao Song" from Brecht's and Weill's Happy End in the first act wedding scene. Sometimes (e.g. in the 1989 recording) it's sung by Polly in the first act and by Jenny in the second act between song 13 and 14 according to the list above.)
7. Kanonen-Song (Cannon Song – Macheath, Brown)
8. Liebeslied (Love Song – Polly, Macheath)
9. Barbarasong (Barbara Song – Polly) (Note: In the Marc Blitzstein adaptation, this song was moved to the second act and sung by Lucy Brown.)
10. I. Dreigroschenfinale (First Threepenny Finale – Polly, Peachum, Mrs Peachum)

=== Act 2 ===
11. Melodram (Melodrama – Macheath)
11a. Polly's Lied (Polly's Song – Polly)
12. Ballade von der sexuellen Hörigkeit (Ballad of Sexual Dependency – Mrs Peachum) (Note: The 2016 adaptation by Simon Stephens at the National Theatre, London, included "Surabaya Johnny" from the Brecht/Weill play Happe End (sung by Jenny).)
13. Zuhälterballade (Pimp's Ballad or Tango Ballad – Jenny, Macheath)
14. Ballade vom angenehmen Leben (Ballad of the Pleasant Life – Macheath)
15. Eifersuchtsduett (Jealousy Duet – Lucy, Polly)
15b. Arie der Lucy (Aria of Lucy – Lucy)
16. II. Dreigroschenfinale (Second Threepenny Finale – Macheath, Mrs Peachum, Chorus) (Note: In the 2016 National Theatre, London, adaptation, this song was moved after the Tango Ballad as the finale to act one and sung by Mrs Peachum, Macheath and Chorus.)

=== Act 3 ===
17. Lied von der Unzulänglichkeit menschlichen Strebens (Song of the Insufficiency of Human Struggling – Peachum)
17a. Reminiszenz (Reminiscence)
18. Salomonsong (Solomon Song – Jenny)
19. Ruf aus der Gruft (Call from the Grave – Macheath)
20. Grabschrift (Grave Inscription – Macheath)
20a. Gang zum Galgen (Walk to the Gallows – Peachum)
21. III. Dreigroschenfinale (Third Threepenny Finale – Brown, Mrs Peachum, Peachum, Macheath, Polly, Chorus)

== Reception ==
=== Opera or musical theatre? ===
The ambivalent nature of The Threepenny Opera, derived from an 18th-century ballad opera but conceived in terms of 20th-century musical theatre, has led to discussion as to how it can best be characterised. According to critic and musicologist Hans Keller, the work is "the weightiest possible lowbrow opera for highbrows and the most full-blooded highbrow musical for lowbrows".

The Weill authority Stephen Hinton notes that "generic ambiguity is a key to the work's enduring success", and points out the work's deliberate hybrid status:

For Weill [The Threepenny Opera] was not just 'the most consistent reaction to [Richard] Wagner'; it also marked a positive step towards an operatic reform. By explicitly and implicitly shunning the more earnest traditions of the opera house, Weill created a mixed form which incorporated spoken theatre and popular musical idioms. Parody of operatic convention – of Romantic lyricism and happy endings – constitutes a central device.

=== "Mack the Knife" ===
The work's opening and closing lament, "Die Moritat von Mackie Messer," was written just before the Berlin premiere, when actor Harald Paulsen (Macheath) threatened to quit if his character did not receive an introduction; this creative emergency resulted in what would become the work's most popular song, later translated into English by Marc Blitzstein as "Mack the Knife", and now a jazz standard that Louis Armstrong, Bobby Darin, Ella Fitzgerald, Sonny Rollins, Frank Sinatra, Peggy Lee, Michael Bublé, Robbie Williams and countless others have performed. In 2015, the Library of Congress added the recordings of "Mack the Knife" by Louis Armstrong and Bobby Darin to the National Recording Registry. It has been named one of the hundred most popular songs of the twentieth century.

In 1986, American fast-food chain McDonald's launched an advertising campaign featuring a new mascot "Mac Tonight" loosely based on the lyrics "Mack the Knife" featuring a parody of the song. The advert, which was associated with a 10% increase in later diners in some Californian restaurants at the time, led to a lawsuit by Bobby Darin's son, Dodd Mitchell Darin. The lawsuit concerned the parody created by McDonald's stated that it was in violation of copyright law. The case was settled outside of court without requiring a court hearing. Following this the mascot was mostly dropped from McDonalds marketing.

=== "Pirate Jenny" ===
"Pirate Jenny" is another well-known song from the work, which has since been recorded by Nina Simone, Judy Collins, Tania Tsanaklidou, and Marc Almond, among others. In addition, Steeleye Span recorded it under the alternative title "The Black Freighter". Recently, the drag queen Sasha Velour has made an adaptation by the same name for an installment of One Dollar Drags, an anthology of short films.

=== "The Second Threepenny Finale" ===
Under the title "What Keeps Mankind Alive?", this number has been recorded by the Pet Shop Boys on the B-side of their 1993 single "Can You Forgive Her?", and on two albums. Tom Waits covered it on two albums, and William S. Burroughs performed it in a 1994 documentary.

== Revivals ==
=== Germany ===
After World War II, the first stage performance in Berlin was a rough production of The Threepenny Opera at the Theater am Schiffbauerdamm. Wolf Von Eckardt described the 1945 performance where audience members climbed over ruins and passed through a tunnel to reach the open-air auditorium deprived of its ceiling. In addition to the smell of dead bodies trapped beneath the rubble, Eckardt recollects the actors themselves were "haggard, starved, [and] in genuine rags. Many of the actors ... had only just been released from concentration camp. They sang not well, but free." Barrie Kosky produced the work again at the Theater am Schiffbauerdamm in 2021. The production travelled to the Ruhrfestspiele in 2022, the Internationaal Theater Amsterdam, Teatro Argentina, Rome, the Edinburgh International Festival in 2023, to the 2024 Adelaide Festival and the Brooklyn Academy of Music in 2025.

=== France ===
The Pabst film The Threepenny Opera was shown in its French version in 1931. In 1937 there was a production by Ernst Josef Aufricht at the Théâtre de l'Étoile which failed, though Brecht himself had attended rehearsals. The work was not revived in France until after World War II.

=== United Kingdom ===
In London, West End and Off-West End revivals include:

- Royal Court Theatre, 9 February to 20 March 1956 and Aldwych Theatre, from 21 March 1956. Directed by Sam Wanamaker. With Bill Owen as Macheath, Daphne Anderson as Polly.
- Prince of Wales Theatre and Piccadilly Theatre, opening 10 February 1972. With Vanessa Redgrave, Diana Quick and Barbara Windsor.
- National Theatre (Olivier Theatre), 13 March 1986. New translation by Robert David MacDonald, directed by Peter Wood. With Tim Curry as Macheath, Sally Dexter as Polly, Joanna Foster as Lucy and Eve Polycarpou (Adam) as Jenny.
- Donmar Warehouse, 1994. Translation by Robert David MacDonald (book) and Jeremy Sams (lyrics). With Tom Hollander as Macheath and Sharon Small as Polly. This production released a cast recording as was nominated for Best Musical Revival and Best Supporting Performance in a Musical (for Tara Hugo as Jenny) at the 1995 Laurence Olivier Awards.
- National Theatre (Cottesloe Theatre) and UK Tour, February 2003. Translation by Jeremy Sams (lyrics) and Anthony Meech (book), directed by Tim Baker.
- National Theatre (Olivier Theatre), 18 May to 1 October 2016. New adaptation by Simon Stephens, directed by Rufus Norris. With Rory Kinnear as Macheath, Rosalie Craig as Polly, Nick Holder as Peachum, Haydn Gwynne as Mrs Peachum (nominated for Best Actress in a Supporting Role in a Musical at the 2017 Laurence Olivier Awards), Sharon Small as Jenny, Peter de Jersey as Brown. This production was broadcast live to cinemas worldwide through NT Live on 22 September.

In 2014, the Robert David MacDonald and Jeremy Sams translation (previously used in 1994 at the Donmar Warehouse) toured the UK, presented by the Graeae Theatre Company with Nottingham Playhouse, New Wolsey Theatre Ipswich, Birmingham Repertory Theatre and West Yorkshire Playhouse.

=== United States ===
In 1946, four performances of the work were given at the University of Illinois Urbana-Champaign, and Northwestern University gave six performances in 1948 in Evanston, Illinois. In 1952, Leonard Bernstein conducted a concert performance of the work at the Brandeis University Creative Arts Festival in the Adolph Ullman Amphitheatre, Waltham, Massachusetts, to an audience of nearly 5,000. Marc Blitzstein, who translated the work, narrated.

At least five Broadway and Off-Broadway revivals have been mounted in New York City.

- In 1956, Lotte Lenya won a Tony Award for her role as Jenny, the only time an off-Broadway performance has been so honored, in Blitzstein's somewhat softened version of The Threepenny Opera, which played Off-Broadway at the Theater de Lys in Greenwich Village for a total of 2,707 performances, beginning with an interrupted 96-performance run in 1954 and resuming in 1955. Blitzstein had translated the work into English, and toned down some of its acerbities. Over the course of its run, the production featured Scott Merrill as Macheath; Ed Asner as Mr. Peachum; Charlotte Rae (later Carole Cook, billed as Mildred Cook, then Jane Connell) as Mrs Peachum; Jo Sullivan Loesser as Polly; Bea Arthur as Lucy; Jerry Orbach as PC Smith, the Street Singer and Mack; John Astin as Readymoney Matt/Matt of the Mint; and Jerry Stiller as Crookfinger Jake.
- A nine-month run in 1976–77 had a new translation by Ralph Manheim and John Willett for Joe Papp's New York Shakespeare Festival at the Vivian Beaumont Theater at Lincoln Center, directed by Richard Foreman, with Raul Julia as Macheath, Blair Brown as Lucy, and Ellen Greene as Jenny. The production rescinded some of Blitzstein's modifications. Critics were divided: Clive Barnes called it "the most interesting and original thing that Joe Papp ... has produced" whilst John Simon wrote "I cannot begin to list all the injuries done to Bertolt Brecht and Kurt Weill's masterpiece."
- A 1989 Broadway production, billed as 3 Penny Opera, translated by Michael Feingold, starred Sting as Macheath. Its cast also featured Georgia Brown as Mrs Peachum, Maureen McGovern as Polly, Kim Criswell as Lucy, KT Sullivan as Suky Tawdry and Ethyl Eichelberger as the Street Singer. The production was unsuccessful.
- Liberally adapted by playwright Wallace Shawn, the work was brought back to Broadway by the Roundabout Theatre Company at Studio 54 in March 2006 with Alan Cumming playing Macheath, Nellie McKay as Polly, Cyndi Lauper as Jenny, Jim Dale as Mr Peachum, Ana Gasteyer as Mrs Peachum, Carlos Leon as Filch, Adam Alexi-Malle as Jacob and Brian Charles Rooney as a male Lucy. Included in the cast were drag performers. The director was Scott Elliott, the choreographer Aszure Barton, and, while not adored by the critics, the production was nominated for the "Best Musical Revival" Tony award. Jim Dale was also Tony-nominated for Best Supporting Actor. The run ended on 25 June 2006.
- The Brooklyn Academy of Music presented a production directed by Robert Wilson and featuring the Berliner Ensemble for only a few performances in October 2011. The play was presented in German with English supertitles using the 1976 translation by John Willett. The cast included Stefan Kurt as Macheath, Stefanie Stappenbeck as Polly and Angela Winkler as Jenny. The Village Voice review said the production "turn[ed] Brecht and Weill's middle-class wake-up call into dead entertainment for rich people. His gelid staging and pallid, quasi-abstract recollections of Expressionist-era design suggested that the writers might have been trying to perpetrate an artsified remake of Kander and Ebb's Cabaret.

Regional productions include:

- Boston's Charles Playhouse, 27 April through 6 June 1982. Adapted by Marc Blitzstein and directed by Geraldine Fitzgerald, the production starred Elly Stone, Timothy Landfield, Jessica James, and Maryann Plunkett.
- The Williamstown Theatre Festival, Massachusetts, in June and July 2003. Directed by Peter Hunt, the musical starred Jesse L. Martin as Mack, Melissa Errico as Polly, David Schramm as Peachum, Karen Ziemba as Lucy Brown and Betty Buckley as Jenny. The production received favorable reviews.

== Film adaptations ==
German director G. W. Pabst made a 1931 German- and French-language version simultaneously, a common practice in the early days of sound films.

Wolfgang Staudte's 1963 German film starred Curd Jürgens as Macheath, Hildegard Knef as Jenny, Gert Fröbe as Peachum, and Sammy Davis Jr. as Moritat singer.

Menahem Golan directed a 1989 American version titled Mack the Knife, with Raul Julia as Macheath, Richard Harris as Peachum, Julie Walters as Mrs Peachum, Bill Nighy as Tiger Brown, Julia Migenes as Jenny, and Roger Daltrey as the Street Singer.

== Radio adaptations ==
In October 1978, BBC Radio 3 broadcast a complete radio production of the Ralph Manheim/John Willett translation directed by Ian Cotterell and Elaine Padmore to celebrate the 50th anniversary of The Threepenny Opera 's publication. The cast included Paul Bentley as Macheath, Sarah Badel as Polly (with her songs being sung by Elaine Padmore), Johanna Peters as Mrs Peachum, Harold Kasket as Mr. Peachum, Jan Waters as Lucy, Julia McKenzie as Jenny, Peter Pratt as Tiger Brown, Roderick Horn as the Ballad Singer and John Hollis as The Narrator.

In 2009, BBC Radio 3 in collaboration with the BBC Philharmonic broadcast a complete radio production of the Michael Feingold translation directed by Nadia Molinari with the music performed by the BBC Philharmonic. The cast included Joseph Millson as Macheath, Elen Rhys as Polly/Whore, Ruth Alexander-Rubin as Mrs Peachum/Whore, Zubin Varla as Mr. Peachum/Rev. Kimball, Rosalie Craig as Lucy/Whore, Ute Gfrerer as Jenny, Conrad Nelson as Tiger Brown and HK Gruber (who also conducted the orchestra) as the Ballad Singer.

== English translations ==
- Gifford Cochran and Jerrold Krimsky, 1933:
- Desmond Vesey (book) and Eric Bentley (lyrics), 1949:
- Marc Blitzstein, 1954:
- John Willett and Ralph Manheim, 1976:
- Jeremy Sams (lyrics) and Robert David Macdonald (book), 1994:
- Wallace Shawn, 2005:
- Brian Vinero, 2024:

== Recordings ==
Recordings are in German, unless otherwise specified.

- Die Dreigroschenoper, 1930, on Telefunken. Abridged/incomplete. Lotte Lenya (Jenny), Erika Helmke (Polly), Willy Trenk-Trebitsch (Macheath), Kurt Gerron (Moritatensänger; Brown), and Erich Ponto (Peachum). Lewis Ruth Band, conducted by Theo Mackeben. Released on CD by Teldec Classics in 1990.
- The Threepenny Opera, 1954, on Decca Broadway 159 463. In English. Lyrics by Marc Blitzstein. The 1950s Broadway cast, starring Jo Sullivan (Polly Peachum), Lotte Lenya (Jenny), Charlotte Rae (Mrs Peachum), Scott Merrill (Macheath), Gerald Price (Street Singer), and Martin Wolfson (Peachum). Bea Arthur sings Lucy, normally a small role, here assigned an extra number. Complete recording of the score, without spoken dialogues. Conducted by Samuel Matlowsky.
- Die Dreigroschenoper, 1955, on Vanguard 8057, with Anny Felbermayer, Hedy Fassler, Jenny Miller, Rosette Anday, Helge Rosvaenge, Alfred Jerger, Kurt Preger and Liane Augustin. Vienna State Opera Orchestra conducted by F. Charles Adler.
- Die Dreigroschenoper, 1958, on CBS MK 42637. Lenya, who also supervised the production, Johanna von Koczian, Trude Hesterberg, Erich Schellow, Wolfgang Neuss, and Willy Trenk-Trebitsch, Arndt Chorus, Sender Freies Berlin Orchestra, conducted by Wilhelm Brückner-Rüggeberg. Complete recording of the score, without spoken dialogues.
- Die Dreigroschenoper, 1966, conducted by Wolfgang Rennert on Philips. With Karin Hübner, Edith Teichmann, Anita Mey, Hans Korte, Dieter Brammer, and Franz Kutschera.
- The Threepenny Opera, 1976, on Columbia PS 34326. Conducted by Stanley Silverman. In English, new translation by Ralph Manheim and John Willett. Starring the New York Shakespeare Festival cast, including Raul Julia (Macheath), Ellen Greene (Jenny), Caroline Kava (Polly), Blair Brown (Lucy), C. K. Alexander (Peachum) and Elizabeth Wilson (Mrs Peachum)
- Die Dreigroschenoper, 1968, on Polydor 00289 4428349 (2 CDs). Hannes Messemer (MM), Helmut Qualtinger (P), Berta Drews (MsP), Karin Baal (Polly), Martin Held (B), Hanne Wieder (J), Franz Josef Degenhardt (Mor). Conducted by James Last. The only recording, up to the present, that contains the complete spoken dialogue.
- Die Dreigroschenoper, 1988, on Decca 430 075. René Kollo (Macheath), Mario Adorf (Peachum), Helga Dernesch (Mrs Peachum), Ute Lemper (Polly), Milva (Jenny), Wolfgang Reichmann (Tiger Brown), Susanne Tremper (Lucy), Rolf Boysen (Herald). RIAS Berlin Sinfonietta, John Mauceri.
- Die Dreigroschenoper, 1990, on Koch International Classics 37006. Manfred Jung (Macheath), Stephanie Myszak (Polly), Anelia Shoumanova (Jenny), Herrmann Becht (Peachum), Anita Herrmann (Mrs Peachum), Eugene Demerdjiev (Brown), Waldemar Kmentt (Street Singer); Bulgarian Television and Radio Mixed Choir and Symphony Orchestra, Victor C. Symonette
- The Threepenny Opera, 1994, on CDJAY 1244. In English. Donmar Warehouse (London) production. Translated by Robert David Macdonald (lyrics translated by Jeremy Sams). Conducted by Gary Yershon. With Sharon Small (Polly Peachum), Tara Hugo (Jenny), Natasha Bain (Lucy Brown), Tom Hollander (Macheath), Simon Dormandy (Tiger Brown), Beverley Klein (Mrs Peachum) and Tom Mannion (Mr Peachum).
- Die Dreigroschenoper, 1997, on Capriccio. Conducted by Jan Latham-König, with Ulrike Steinsky, Gabriele Ramm, Jane Henschel, Walter Raffeiner, Rolf Wollrad, and Peter Nikolaus Kante.
- Die Dreigroschenoper, 1999, BMG Classics 74321-66133, Ensemble Modern, HK Gruber (conductor, Mr Peachum), Max Raabe (Macheath), Sona MacDonald (Polly), Nina Hagen (Mrs Peachum), Timna Brauer (Jenny), Hannes Hellmann (Tiger Brown)

== Awards and nominations ==
=== 1954 Off-Broadway revival ===
| Year | Award | Category | Nominee | Result |
|---|---|---|---|---|
| 1954 | Theatre World Award | | Scott Merrill | Won |

=== 1955 Off-Broadway revival ===
| Year | Award | Category | Nominee | Result |
|---|---|---|---|---|
| 1956 | Tony Award | Best Featured Actor in a Musical | Scott Merrill | Nominated |
| 1956 | Tony Award | Best Featured Actress in a Musical | Lotte Lenya | Won |
| 1956 | Tony Award | Special Tony Award | | Nominated |

=== 1976 Broadway revival ===
| Year | Award | Category | Nominee | Result |
|---|---|---|---|---|
| 1977 | Tony Award | Most Innovative Production of a Revival | | Nominated |
| 1977 | Tony Award | Best Actor in a Musical | Raul Julia | Nominated |
| 1977 | Tony Award | Best Featured Actress in a Musical | Ellen Greene | Nominated |
| 1977 | Tony Award | Best Costume Design | Theoni V. Aldredge | Nominated |
| 1977 | Tony Award | Best Lighting Design | Pat Collins | Nominated |

=== 1989 Broadway revival ===
| Year | Award | Category | Nominee | Result |
|---|---|---|---|---|
| 1990 | Tony Award | Best Actress in a Musical | Georgia Brown | Nominated |

=== 1994 London revival ===
| Year | Award | Category | Nominee | Result |
|---|---|---|---|---|
| 1995 | Laurence Olivier Award | Best Musical Revival | | Nominated |
| 1995 | Laurence Olivier Award | Best Performance in a Supporting Role in a Musical | Tara Hugo | Nominated |

=== 2006 Broadway revival ===
| Year | Award | Category | Nominee | Result |
|---|---|---|---|---|
| 2006 | Tony Award | Best Revival of a Musical | | Nominated |
| 2006 | Tony Award | Best Featured Actor in a Musical | Jim Dale | Nominated |
| 2006 | Drama Desk Award | Outstanding Featured Actor in a Musical | Jim Dale | Won |
| 2006 | Theatre World Award | | Nellie McKay | Won |

=== 2016 London revival ===
| Year | Award | Category | Nominee | Result |
|---|---|---|---|---|
| 2017 | Laurence Olivier Award | Best Actress in a Supporting Role in a Musical | Haydn Gwynne | Nominated |

== See also ==
- Threepenny Novel (1934)
- Story adapted to Brazilian scenario by Chico Buarque, having Rio instead of London, as Ópera do Malandro (1979)
- The League of Extraordinary Gentlemen, Volume III: Century
