= Threepenny Novel =

1956 novel by Bertolt Brecht

- Grove Press edn., 1956
- Author: Bertolt Brecht
- Language: German
- Publisher: Grove Press
- Publication date: 1956

Threepenny Novel (German: Dreigroschenroman) is a 1934 German novel by the dramatist and poet Bertolt Brecht, first published in Amsterdam by Allert de Lange in 1934. It is similar in structure to his more famous The Threepenny Opera and features several of the same characters such as Macheath, together with a general anti-capitalist focus and a didactic technique that is often associated with the dramatist. It is a novel that has been the focus of much critical attention and that is often described as both a continuation and a variation of the themes and motifs of Brecht's other work that focuses on alienation and on the communication of a social message. It can be seen alternatively as a careful development of the detective novel genre and as scathing criticism of the social conditions and the economic practices of German businesses and banks in the middle of the 20th century.

In particular, it can be seen to have a peculiar relationship to history. According to Brecht's friend and intellectual confidant, Walter Benjamin, the novel is one that contains several different strands of history that do not directly match up. In the novel, Benjamin observes that "Brecht draws epochs together and billets his gangster type in London that has the rhythm and appearance of the age of Dickens. Private life is subject to the earlier conditions; the class struggle, to those of today. These Londoners have no telephones but their police already have tanks." This aspect of the novel has drawn much critical attention and has helped to make sure that it is considered to be one of Brecht's most famous and important works of prose.

== Plot ==
The novel is set in London at the turn of the 20th century and its plot focuses on the machinations and developments of finance capital, something that is often considered to be unusual for Brecht as his work is traditionally viewed as being more concerned with conditions of industrial production. The plot is organised around the activities of three different financial consortiums in London. Three central characters each take their place with their own strand of the capitalist economy in order to shows ways in which this economy can be seen to effect each individual person in complex and often unpredictable ways. A character named Peachum maintains a syndicate of street beggars whom he ruthlessly exploits, a character named Coax attempts to invest in a commercial shipping venture and Macheath, a gangster, the character alluded to in the song "Mack the Knife", maintains a commercial venture. Macheath is presented in the novel as someone who has left behind his previous life as a cut-throat gangster and is now attempting to make serious progress in business by engaging in direct competition and attempting to absorb and defeat his competitors in a commercial way. As well as depicting Macheath's rise to power, the novel also focuses on the ways in which Macheath is able to court Polly, the daughter Peachum. Brecht employs a series of complex plot twists and turns in order to demonstrate Macheath's rise to power and to show the way in which he is able to do this often with legal sanction. The novel ends with Macheath as someone who restructures his business, takes over his competitors and eventually becomes the head of a large and important bank.

The novel is intended as a critique of finance capital and of a society that encourages sociopathic behaviour in order to achieve success. It is known that Brecht directly based his understanding of Macheath's own business strategies on the contemporary corporate strategies, especially modelling it on those pioneered by major German stores and supermarkets such as Karstadt and EPA. As such, the novel is set both between London at the end of the 19th century and Brecht's contemporary Germany. Several details in the novel can be seen to represent a satire of these conditions. Notably several characters die in horrific ways as a result of overwork necessitated by the system. At the same time, the world is shown to be one that encourages conflict and that actively translates the most gangsterish impulses into the sphere of bureaucracy into an acceptable mode for the modern world. Throughout the work, Brecht is keen to draw attention to the fact that the brutality and criminality of earlier modes of society have not been overcome in this process. At one key point in the novel this is shown as Macheath reminisces nostalgically about his previous life as a gangster and states that he wishes that he could return to these conditions in which conflict and violence could be carried out openly instead of being hidden behind bureaucracy.

The novel also shows that the legal system and the courts are weighted in favour of capitalist conditions and provides a criticism of the morality that this leads to. In particular, in several key ways the novel mimics the structure of a detective novel, however it does so in order to satirise the fact that within a capitalist economy it is almost impossible to find an individual who is not guilty, in some way or other, of contributing towards the continued exploitation of individuals. In one scene, a hypothetical trial is suggested in which all the dead would come forward and present their experience of exploitation in order to fully understand which historical individuals are guilty of exploitation. This dream clearly demonstrates the absurdity of the world as it exists and the near impossibility of attaining justice through conventional means in the world of capitalism.

== Marxist elements ==
The novel is one of the most obviously Marxist of Brecht's work, and indeed can be seen to quote directly from Marx's Das Kapital at several key points, even at one point directly reproducing a passage detailing the working to death of a 19th-century woman that appears in the chapter of Das Kapital detailing the working day. In particular, Brecht can be seen to employ a Marxist understanding of the way in which labour time is employed by capitalism in order to make sure that the most possible amount of profit is made in every possible instance. This involves directly ignoring the needs and desires of those who work within it and aggressively subsuming human individuals within their simple capacity to be laborers rather than people. This is made clear throughout the novel via the introduction of a specifically Marxist understanding of economics and of Capitalism as a totality in which people do not behave as singular individuals but rather as representatives of economic categories.

== Legacy and influence ==
Although the Threepenny Novel is less famous than Brecht's plays, it is nonetheless considered by many to be a masterful work of satire and to hold an important place in his overall body of work. In particular its critique of capitalist temporality, its use of differing registers and its capacity to translate industrial production into a bureaucratic sphere have recently attracted attention from literary critics and also from critical theorists. Historically the novel can be seen as an important marker of Brecht's friendship with Walter Benjamin, whose review of the novel contains early formulations of his own theories of history and of a Marxist understanding of aesthetics.
