= Polly (opera) =

1729 Ballad opera

- Original language: English
- Written by: John Gay
- Setting: The West Indies

Premiere
- Date: 19 June 1777
- Place: Haymarket Theatre

Polly is a 1729 ballad opera with text by John Gay and music by Johann Christoph Pepusch. It is a sequel to Gay's The Beggar's Opera. Due to censorship, the opera was not performed in Gay's lifetime. It had its world premiere on 19 June 1777 at the Haymarket Theatre in London.

== Plot ==
The opera relates the adventures of Polly Peachum in the West Indies. Macheath is transported to the West Indies, and becomes a pirate, disguised as a black man and under the pseudonym of 'Morano'. He is in the company of Jenny Diver, the prostitute from the first play who had betrayed him—so Macheath is living bigamously. Polly goes to the West Indies looking for Macheath. Mrs Trapes (also from 'The Beggar's Opera') has set up in white-slaving and shanghais Polly to sell her to the wealthy planter Mr Ducat. Polly is taken into service in the Ducat household. On hearing Polly's story, Mrs Ducat advises her to disguise herself as a young man, to ward off unwelcome male attention. After skirmishes between the Indians (in alliance with the colonials) and the pirates, the pirates are routed and identities are revealed. The play ends with Macheath being executed on the orders of the Indian King Pohetohee, and Polly marrying his son Cawwawkee, after her period of mourning.

== Reception ==
Like its predecessor, Polly was censored during its time. The production was forbidden by the Lord Chamberlain (the Duke of Grafton), probably through Walpole's influence. However, the censorship did not affect Gay much – on the contrary, it proved to be excellent advertisement. The play was published by subscription in 1729, and Gay earned several thousand pounds.

In fact, the Duchess of Queensberry was dismissed from court for enlisting subscribers in the palace. The Duke of Queensberry gave Gay a home, and Gay received affectionate patronage until his death on 4 December 1732.

The play was not produced on stage during Gay's lifetime, as Walpole found the satire in Polly much more blatant and strong than the first play. It was banned from rehearsal by the Lord Chamberlain for being a filthy and libellous work. However, since Polly followed close on the heels of its predecessor, it was probably not so much the subject matter, rather the fact that it was a play by Gay that caused it to be banned. Its stage premiere took place on 19 June 1777 at the Haymarket Theatre, London.

However, the ban was effective only in name, as the play was not only printed and sold in April 1729, but in June of the same year, Gay and his publisher had injunctions brought against 17 printers and booksellers for piracy of the work.

== Adaptations ==
A version of Polly with Pepusch's score revised and edited by Frederic Austin and Gay's libretto adapted by Clifford Bax premiered on 30 December 1922 at the Kingsway Theatre in London. In adapting Polly, Bax abridged the text; extended certain scenes while removing others; cut characters; renamed the character Cutlace to Cutlass; and added a happy ending, in which Jenny couples with a pirate, Vanderbluff, and Polly and Macheath wed (again). A sequel to the Bax adaptation of Polly was published in Punch in 1923.

In 1975, a version of Polly, adapted and directed by Robert Kalfin, premiered at the Brooklyn Academy of Music.

In 2017, Sharpteeth Theater adapted Polly as Polly: The Heartbreak Opera.
