= Ernst Josef Aufricht =

German actor and theater director (1898–1971)

Ernst Josef Aufricht (31 August 1898 – 24 July 1971) was a German actor and theater director.

== Life ==
Ernst Aufricht was born on 31 August 1898 in Beuthen, Upper Silesia (now Bytom, Poland). He was the eldest son of a wealthy timber wholesaler. In 1902, the Aufricht family settled in Gliwice, where Ernst Josef also attended school. Aufricht was so impressed by a lecture evening by Marcell Salzer that he initiated several recitation evenings at his grammar school; the majority of them were dramas by Friedrich Schiller and Johann Wolfgang von Goethe, read in distributed roles.

As a one-year volunteer, Aufricht took part in the First World War and served as a field artilleryman in Poznan. During this time, he met the actor Ludwig Hartau in Berlin in the role of "newspaper publisher Dr. Schön" in the tragedy Der Erdgeist by Frank Wedekind. When he got to know Hartau personally, Aufricht decided to become an actor.

His experiences during the war made Aufricht a convinced pacifist and socialist. His father urged him to study medicine, but he gave it up after just one semester in favor of acting. He went to Berlin and became a private pupil of Hartau. With Hartau's support, Aufricht was able to make his debut at the Staatsschauspiel Dresden in the winter of 1920.

He remained there until 1923 and then got an engagement at the Lustspielhaus in Berlin. In 1924, he moved to the Deutsches Künstlertheater and remained there until 1925. He was a member of the ensemble at the Berlin Volkstheater in 1925/27 and at the Berlin Thalia-Theater in 1927/28.

Together with Berthold Viertel, Aufricht founded the acting ensemble Die Truppe in Berlin in 1923. He rented the Lustspielhaus on Friedrichstraße for its more modern productions. The theater opened with William Shakespeare's The Merchant of Venice. With financial support from his father (100,000 gold marks), Aufricht leased the Theater am Schiffbauerdamm, renovated it and ran it as director until the end of the 1931 season. After just four weeks of rehearsals, he opened his theater on 31 August 1928 with the world premiere of Bertolt Brecht and Kurt Weill's The Threepenny Opera. Erich Engel (director), Theo Mackeben (rehearsing the songs) and Caspar Neher (stage design) also played their part in the overwhelming success.

== Art collection ==
Aufrichte had an art collection that included works from Alexej Jawlensky, Georg Grosz, Peter August Böckstiegel and many other artists.

== Nazi era flight to the United States ==
In March 1933, Aufricht went into exile in Switzerland and later to France. In Paris, he tried to work as a theater director again, but was unsuccessful. His attempt to open a boarding house in Deauville was also unsuccessful. It was only when he rented the Théâtre de l'Étoile for the 1937 World Exhibition in Paris and staged the Threepenny Opera in French translation that he enjoyed a small measure of success. From January 1938, he co-directed the Théâtre de Minuit (Paris) with Raymond Rouleau, which later became the Théâtre Pigalle.

After the invasion of France by German troops, Aufricht fled to the United States in 1940–1941. He settled in New York and tried to earn a living on Broadway. During this time, he produced the radio play series The Schulzes in Yorkville for a New York radio station. These radio plays served to provide political education, especially for Americans with German roots. During the creation of these radio plays, Aufricht made the acquaintance of Father Benno Aichinger, the former Superior General of the Capuchin Order.

Aufricht returned to Berlin in 1953 and devoted himself to the theater here as well. In 1955, he successfully appeared in Herr Nachtigall by Claus Hubalek.

He died on 24 July 1971 in Cannes, France.

== Works ==
- Und der Haifisch, der hat Zähne. Aufzeichnungen eines Theaterdirektors. Alexander Verlag, Berlin 1998, ISBN 3-89581-012-6 (früherer Titel: Erzähle, damit Du Dein Recht erweist).

== Literature ==
- Georg Hensel: Spielplan. Schauspielführer von der Antike bis zur Gegenwart. Econ, Munich 2001/03, ISBN 3-548-75059-1 (2 Bde.).
- Herbert Jhering: Von Reinhardt bis Brecht. Eine Auswahl der Theaterkritiken von 1902-1932. Rowohlt, Reinbek 1967.
- Georg Rühle: Theater für die Republik 1917-1933. Im Spiegel der Kritik. Henschelverlag, Berlin 1988, ISBN 3-362-00240-4.
- Aufricht, Ernst Josef. In: Lexikon deutsch-jüdischer Autoren. Band 1: A–Benc. Hrsg. vom Archiv Bibliographia Judaica. Saur, Munich 1992, ISBN 3-598-22681-0, pp. 260–261.
- C. Bernd Sucher (Hg.): Theaterlexikon. Autoren, Regisseure, Schauspieler, Dramaturgen, Bühnenbildner, Kritiker. Von Christine Dössel und Marietta Piekenbrock unter Mitwirkung von Jean-Claude Kuner und C. Bernd Sucher. 1995, 2. Auflage, Deutscher Taschenbuch Verlag, Munich 1999, ISBN 3-423-03322-3, p. 30.
- Aufricht, Ernst Josef, in: Ernst Klee: Das Kulturlexikon zum Dritten Reich. Wer war was vor und nach 1945. Frankfurt: S. Fischer, 2007, ISBN 978-3-10-039326-5, p. 21
