= Mark Northover =

British actor (1950-2004)

- Northover as Burglekutt in the 1988 film Willow
- Born: 27 March 1950; Poole, Dorset, England
- Died: 6 June 2004 (aged 54); Upton, Dorset, England
- Occupation: Actor
- Years active: 1988–1999

Mark Northover (27 March 1950 – 6 June 2004) was a British actor with dwarfism, whose best-known screen character was Burglekutt in the 1988 film Willow. Another memorable role was that of Alvy in Hardware. Outside cinema, he made an appearance in the music video for Depeche Mode's "Walking in My Shoes".

Northover died at 54 of a heart attack in Upton, Dorset. He was survived by wife Patsy and namesake son Mark.

== Filmography ==
Year	Title	Role	Notes
1988	Willow	Burglekutt	
1989	Mack the Knife	Jimmy Jewels	
1990	Hardware	Alvy	
1991	The Doors		
1999	A Kind of Hush	Uncle Chris	(final film role)
