= The Beggar's Opera =

1728 ballad opera by John Gay

- Satirical ballad opera by Johann Christoph Pepusch
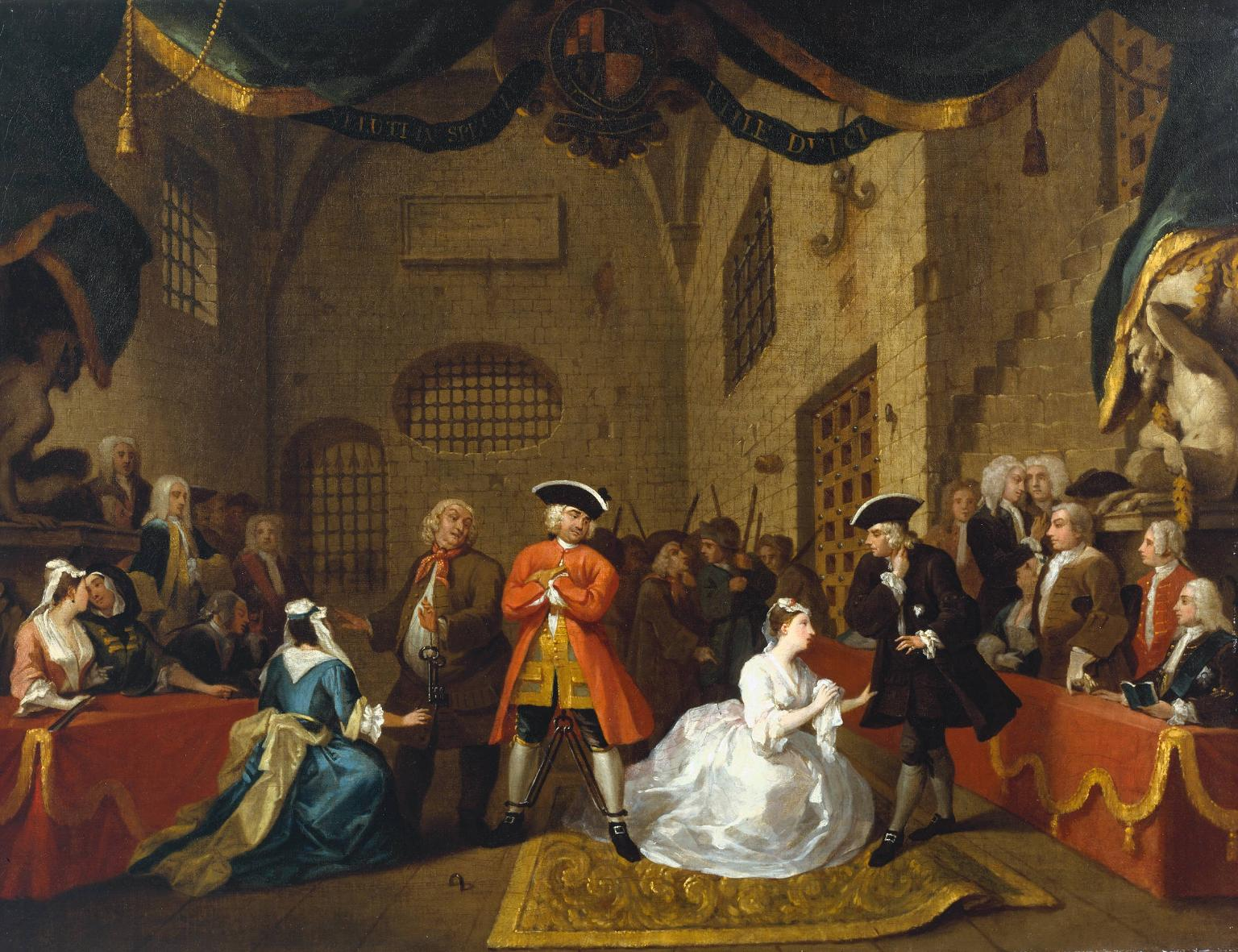
- Painting based on scene 11, act 3 by William Hogarth, c. 1728, in the Tate Britain
- Librettist: John Gay
- Premiere: 29 January 1728; Lincoln's Inn Fields Theatre, London

The Beggar's Opera is a ballad opera in three acts written in 1728 by the English poet and dramatist John Gay with music arranged by the German-born Baroque composer Johann Christoph Pepusch. It is one of the watershed plays in Augustan drama and is the only example of the once thriving genre of satirical ballad opera to remain popular today. Ballad operas were satiric musical plays that used some of the conventions of opera, but without recitative. The lyrics of the airs in the piece are set to popular broadside ballads, opera arias, church hymns, and folk tunes of the time.

The Beggar's Opera premiered at the Lincoln's Inn Fields Theatre on 29 January 1728 and ran for 62 consecutive performances, the second-longest run in theatre history up to that time (after 146 performances of Robert Cambert's Pomone in Paris in 1671). The work became Gay's greatest success and has been played ever since; it has been called "the most popular play of the eighteenth century". In 1920, The Beggar's Opera began a revival run of 1,463 performances at the Lyric Theatre in Hammersmith, London, which was one of the longest runs in history for any piece of musical theatre at that time.

The piece satirised Italian opera, which had become popular in London. According to The New York Times: "Gay wrote the work more as an anti-opera than an opera, one of its attractions to its 18th-century London public being its lampooning of the Italian opera style and the English public's fascination with it." Instead of the grand music and themes of opera, the work uses familiar tunes and characters that were ordinary people. Some of the songs were by opera composers like Handel, but only the most popular of these were used. The audience could hum along with the music and identify with the characters. The story satirised politics, poverty and injustice, focusing on the theme of corruption at all levels of society. Lavinia Fenton, the first Polly Peachum, became an overnight success. Her pictures were in great demand, verses were written to her and books published about her. After appearing in several comedies, and then in numerous repetitions of The Beggar's Opera, she ran away with her married lover, Charles Powlett, 3rd Duke of Bolton.

Bertolt Brecht (working from a translation into German by Elisabeth Hauptmann) adapted the work into Die Dreigroschenoper (The Threepenny Opera) in 1928, sticking closely to the original plot and characters but with a new libretto, and mostly new music by Kurt Weill.

== Origin and analysis ==
The original idea of the opera came from Jonathan Swift, who wrote to Alexander Pope on 30 August 1716 asking "...what think you, of a Newgate pastoral among the thieves and whores there?" Their friend, Gay, decided that it would be a satire rather than a pastoral opera. For his original production in 1728, Gay intended all the songs to be sung without any accompaniment, adding to the shocking and gritty atmosphere of his conception. However, a week or so before the opening night, John Rich, the theatre director, insisted on having Johann Christoph Pepusch, a composer associated with his theatre, write a formal French overture (based on two of the songs in the opera, including a fugue based on Lucy's 3rd act song "I'm Like A Skiff on the Ocean Toss'd") and also to arrange the 69 songs. Although there is no external evidence of who the arranger was, inspection of the original 1729 score, formally published by Dover Books, demonstrates that Pepusch was the arranger.

The work took satiric aim at the passionate interest of the upper classes in Italian opera, and simultaneously set out to lampoon the notable Whig statesman Robert Walpole, and politicians in general, as well as such notorious criminals as Jonathan Wild, the thief-taker; Claude Duval, the highwayman; and Jack Sheppard, the prison-breaker. It also deals with social inequity on a broad scale, primarily through the comparison of low-class thieves and whores with their aristocratic and bourgeois "betters."

The airs of The Beggar's Opera in part allude to well-known popular ballads, and Gay's lyrics sometimes play with their wording in order to amuse and entertain the audience. Gay used Scottish folk melodies mostly taken from the poet Allan Ramsay's hugely popular collection The Gentle Shepherd (1725) plus two French tunes (including the carol "Quelle est cette odeur agréable?" for his song "Fill Every Glass"), to serve his hilariously pointed and irreverent texts. Macheath's satire on modern society ("The modes of the court so common are grown") is also sung to Henry Purcell's Lillibullero. Pepusch composed an overture and arranged all the tunes shortly before the opening night at Lincoln's Inn Fields on 28 January 1728. However, all that remains of Pepusch's score are the overture (with complete instrumentation) and the melodies of the songs without figured basses. Various reconstructions have been attempted, and a 1990 reconstruction of the score by American composer Jonathan Dobin has been used in a number of modern productions.

Gay uses the operatic norm of three acts (as opposed to the standard in spoken drama of the time of five acts), and tightly controls the dialogue and plot so that there are surprises in each of the forty-five fast-paced scenes and 68 short songs. The success of the opera was accompanied by a public desire for keepsakes and mementos, ranging from images of Polly on fans and clothing, playing cards and fire-screens, broadsides featuring all the characters, and the rapidly published musical score of the opera.

The play is sometimes seen to be a reactionary call for libertarian values in response to the growing power of the Whig party. It may also have been influenced by the then-popular ideology of John Locke that men should be allowed their natural liberties; these democratic strains of thought influenced the populist movements of the time, of which The Beggar's Opera was a part.

The character of Macheath has been considered by critics as both a hero and an anti-hero. Harold Gene Moss, arguing that Macheath is a noble character, has written, "[one] whose drives are toward love and the vital passions, Macheath becomes an almost Christ-like victim of the decadence surrounding him." Contrarily, John Richardson in the peer-reviewed journal Eighteenth-Century Life has argued that Macheath is powerful as a literary figure precisely because he stands against any interpretation, "against expectation and illusion." He is now thought to have been modeled on the gentleman highwayman, Claude Duval, although interest in criminals had recently been raised by Jack Sheppard's escapes from Newgate.

The Beggar's Opera has had an influence on all later British stage comedies, especially on nineteenth century British comic opera and the modern musical.

== Roles ==
Mr Peachum – powerful leader of criminals who betrays or discards his thieves, highwaymen, and prostitutes when they are no longer useful to him
Lockit – jail keeper
Macheath – captain of gang of robbers; a womanizer who professes to love both Polly and Lucy
Filch – the Peachums' loyal but squeamish servant
Jemmy Twitcher	MacHeath's Gang
Crook-Finger'd Jack	MacHeath's Gang
Wat Dreary	MacHeath's Gang
Robin of Bagshot	MacHeath's Gang
Nimming Ned – ("Nimming" meaning thieving)	MacHeath's Gang
Harry Padington	MacHeath's Gang
Finger Dan	MacHeath's Gang
Matt of the Mint	MacHeath's Gang
Ben Budge
Beggar (serves as Narrator)
Player
Mrs Peachum
Polly Peachum
Lucy Lockit
Mrs Diana Trapes
Mrs Coaxer	Women of the Town
Dolly Trull – ("Trull" meaning prostitute)	Women of the Town
Mrs Vixen	Women of the Town
Betty Doxy – ("Doxy" meaning slut)	Women of the Town
Jenny Diver	Women of the Town
Mrs Slammekin – ("Slammerkin" meaning slut)	Women of the Town
Suky Tawdry	Women of the Town
Molly Brazen	Women of the Town
Jailor
Drawer
Constables

== Synopsis ==
=== Act 1 ===
Peachum, a fence and thief-catcher, justifies his actions. Mrs Peachum, overhearing her husband's blacklisting of unproductive thieves, protests regarding one of them: Bob Booty (the nickname of Robert Walpole). The Peachums discover that Polly, their daughter, has secretly married Macheath, the famous highwayman, who is Peachum's principal client. Upset to learn they will no longer be able to use Polly in their business, Peachum and his wife ask how Polly will support such a husband "in Gaming, Drinking and Whoring." Nevertheless, they conclude that the match may be more profitable to the Peachums if the husband can be killed for his money. They leave to carry out this errand. However, Polly has hidden Macheath.

=== Act 2 ===
Macheath goes to a tavern where he is surrounded by women of dubious virtue who, despite their class, compete in displaying perfect drawing-room manners, although the subject of their conversation is their success in picking pockets and shoplifting. Macheath discovers, too late, that two of them (Jenny Diver, Suky Tawdry) have contracted with Peachum to capture him, and he becomes a prisoner in Newgate prison. The prison is run by Peachum's associate, the corrupt jailer Lockit. His daughter, Lucy Lockit, has the opportunity to scold Macheath for having agreed to marry her and then broken this promise. She tells him that to see him tortured would give her pleasure. Macheath pacifies her, but Polly arrives and claims him as her husband. Macheath tells Lucy that Polly is crazy. Lucy helps Macheath to escape by stealing her father's keys. Her father learns of Macheath's promise to marry her and worries that if Macheath is recaptured and hanged, his fortune might be subject to Peachum's claims. Lockit and Peachum discover Macheath's hiding place. They decide to split his fortune.

=== Act 3 ===
Meanwhile, Polly visits Lucy to try to reach an agreement, but Lucy tries to poison her. Polly narrowly avoids the poisoned drink, and the two girls find out that Macheath has been recaptured owing to the inebriated Mrs Diana Trapes. They plead with their fathers for Macheath's life. However, Macheath now finds that four more pregnant women each claim him as their husband. He declares that he is ready to be hanged. The narrator (the Beggar), notes that although in a properly moral ending Macheath and the other villains would be hanged, the audience demands a happy ending, and so Macheath is reprieved, and all are invited to a dance of celebration, to celebrate his wedding to Polly.

== Selected musical numbers ==
- Can Love be control'd by Advice? (Polly, act 1)
- Let us take the Road (Chorus of Highwaymen, act 2)
- At the Tree I shall suffer (Macheath, act 2)
- How cruel are the Traitors (Lucy, act 2)
- How happy could I be with either (Macheath, act 2)
- In the Days of my Youth (Mrs Diana Trapes, act 3)
- The Charge is prepar'd (Macheath, act 3)
- The Modes of the Court so Common are Grown (Macheath, act 3)

== Reception ==
The Beggar's Opera was met with widely varying reactions. Its popularity was documented in The Craftsman with the following entries:

"This Week a Dramatick Entertainment has been exhibited at the Theatre in Lincoln's-Inn-Fields, entitled The Beggar's Opera, which has met with a general Applause, insomuch that the Waggs say it has made Rich very Gay, and probably will make Gay very Rich." (3 February 1728)

"We hear that the British Opera, commonly called The Beggar's Opera, continues to be acted, at the Theatre in Lincoln's-Inn Fields with general Applause, to the great Mortification of the Performers and Admirers of the Outlandish Opera in the Haymarket." (17 February 1728)

Two weeks after opening night, an article appeared in The Craftsman, the leading opposition newspaper, ostensibly protesting at Gay's work as libellous and ironically assisting him in satirising the Walpole establishment by taking the government's side:

It will, I know, be said, by these libertine Stage-Players, that the Satire is general; and that it discovers a Consciousness of Guilt for any particular Man to apply it to Himself. But they seem to forget that there are such things as Innuendo's (a never-failing Method of explaining Libels)… Nay the very Title of this Piece and the principal Character, which is that of a Highwayman, sufficiently discover the mischievous Design of it; since by this Character every Body will understand One, who makes it his Business arbitrarily to levy and collect Money on the People for his own Use, and of which he always dreads to give an Account – Is not this squinting with a vengeance, and wounding Persons in Authority through the Sides of a common Malefactor?

The commentator notes the Beggar's last remark: "That the lower People have their Vices in a Degree as well as the Rich, and are punished for them," implying that rich People are not so punished.

Criticism of Gay's opera continued long after its publication. In 1776, John Hawkins wrote in his History of Music that due to the opera's popularity, "Rapine and violence have been gradually increasing" solely because the rising generation of young men desired to imitate the character Macheath. Hawkins blamed Gay for tempting these men with "the charms of idleness and criminal pleasure," which Hawkins saw Macheath as representing and glorifying.

Mid-century commentary also invoked the opera in arguments about theatrical “infallibility”: the pamphlet The Case of Authors by Profession or Trade, Stated (1758) listed The Beggar’s Opera among works allegedly misjudged or rejected by managers, as part of a broader critique of managerial gatekeeping.

== Legacy ==
=== Sequel ===
In 1729, Gay wrote a sequel, Polly, set in the West Indies: Macheath, sentenced to transportation, has escaped and become a pirate, while Mrs Trapes has set up in white-slaving and shanghais Polly to sell her to the wealthy planter Mr Ducat. Polly escapes dressed as a boy, and after many adventures marries the son of a Carib chief.

The political satire, however, was even more pointed in Polly than in The Beggar's Opera, with the result that Prime Minister Robert Walpole leaned on the Lord Chamberlain to have it banned, and it was not performed until fifty years later.

=== Adaptations ===
Frederic Austin's 1920s version

As was typical practice of the time in London, a commemorative "score" of the entire opera was assembled and published quickly. As was common, this consisted of the fully arranged overture followed by the melodies of the 69 songs, supported by only the simplest bass accompaniments. There are no indications of dance music, accompanying instrumental figures or the like, except in three instances: Lucy's "Is Then His Fate Decree'd Sir" – one measure of descending scale marked "Viol." –; Trape's "In the Days of My Youth", in which the "fa la la chorus is written as "viol."; and the final reprieve dance, Macheath's "Thus I Stand Like A Turk", which includes two sections of 16 measures of "dance" marked "viol." (See the 1729 score, formerly published by Dover).

The absence of the original performing parts has allowed producers and arrangers free rein. The tradition of personalised arrangements, dating back at least as far as Thomas Arne's later 18th century arrangements, continues today, running the gamut of musical styles from Romantic to Baroque: Austin, Britten, Sargent, Bonynge, Dobin and other conductors have each imbued the songs with a personal stamp, highlighting different aspects of characterisation. The hornpipe tune to which Nancy Dawson danced between acts in The Beggar's Opera in the mid-1700s is now used for "Here We Go Round the Mulberry Bush". Following is a list of some of the most highly regarded 20th-century arrangements and settings of the opera.

- In 1920, the baritone Frederic Austin newly arranged the music (and also sang the role of Peachum) for the long-running production (1,685 performances) at the Lyric Theatre, Hammersmith. The Irish baritone Frederick Ranalow sang the role of Captain Macheath in every performance. In 1955 this version was recorded by conductor Sir Malcolm Sargent with John Cameron as Macheath and Monica Sinclair as Lucy.
- In 1928, on the 200th anniversary of the original production, Bertolt Brecht (words) and Kurt Weill (music) created a popular new musical adaptation of the work in Germany entitled Die Dreigroschenoper (The Threepenny Opera). In this work, the original plot is followed fairly closely (although the time is brought forward over a hundred years) but the music is almost all new.
- In 1946, John La Touche (book and lyrics) and Duke Ellington (music) created another musical adaptation of the work for Broadway entitled Beggar's Holiday. An updated rendition of the story focused on a corrupt world inhabited by rakish Mobsters, raffish Madams and their dissolute whores, panhandlers and street people.
- In 1948, Benjamin Britten created an adaptation with new harmonisations and arrangements of pre-existing tunes. Additional dialogue was written by the producer, Tyrone Guthrie. Peter Pears was the first singer of Macheath. It was dedicated to James Haldane Lawrie, who would go on to chair the English Opera Group.
- The opera was made into a film version in 1953, and starred Laurence Olivier as Captain Macheath.
- In 1975, Czech playwright (and future president) Václav Havel created a non-musical adaptation.
- In 1977, the Nigerian Nobel Prize-winning playwright and dramatist Wole Soyinka wrote, produced and directed Opera Wonyosi (published 1981), an adaptation of both John Gay's The Beggar's Opera and Bertolt Brecht's The Threepenny Opera; most of his characters as well as some of the arias are from the two earlier plays.
- In 1978, the Brazilian singer-songwriter Chico Buarque wrote Ópera do Malandro (1978), an adaptation of both John Gay's The Beggar's Opera and Bertolt Brecht's The Threepenny Opera, with new songs and set in 1940s Rio de Janeiro, which was later adapted as a film by director Ruy Guerra.
- In 1981 Richard Bonynge and Douglas Gamley arranged a new edition for The Australian Opera (now Opera Australia). It was recorded the same year with Joan Sutherland, Kiri Te Kanawa, James Morris and Angela Lansbury.
- The opera was adapted for BBC television in 1983. This production was directed by Jonathan Miller and starred Roger Daltrey in the role of Macheath, Stratford Johns as Peachum, Gary Tibbs as Filch, and Bob Hoskins as the Beggar. The "happy" ending was changed so that Macheath is hanged instead of being reprieved.
- In 1984 in the play (and later film) A Chorus of Disapproval by Alan Ayckbourn, an amateur production of The Beggar's Opera is a major plot driver and excerpts are performed.
- In 1990 Jonathan Dobin created his period-styled performing edition for the Ten Ten Players (now Theatre 2020) and it has since been performed at venues throughout the United States. This edition is based on the 1728 printed edition and includes the full overture as detailed by Pepusch and fleshes out all of the remaining 69 airs and dances of the original 18th century production.
- In 1998, the all female Japanese troupe, Takarazuka Revue, produced an adaptation titled Speakeasy. The play was Maya Miki's retirement play.
- In 2008 the Sydney Theatre Company of Australia and Out of Joint Theatre Company co-produced a version entitled The Convict's Opera written by Stephen Jeffreys and directed by Max Stafford-Clark. This version is set aboard a convict ship bound for New South Wales, where convicts are putting on a version of The Beggar's Opera. The lives of the convicts partly mirror their characters in The Beggars' Opera, and modern popular songs are performed throughout the piece. The Convict's Opera began touring the UK in early 2009.
- The theatre company Vanishing Point created a modern production of The Beggar's Opera in 2009 for The Royal Lyceum Theatre and Belgrade Theatre, Coventry, set in a near-future apocalypse world. It features music from A Band Called Quinn.
- The original opera was performed in an 18th-century setting at the Regent's Park Open Air Theatre in summer 2011 in a production directed by Lucy Bailey.
- In 2019, Kneehigh Theatre Company in association with Liverpool Everyman & Playhouse created and toured a reinvention of The Beggar's Opera, called Dead Dog in a Suitcase (and other love songs).
- In 2021, French mezzo-soprano and composer Hélène Ducos created Minuit Montmartre, a four-act opera inspired by The Beggar's Opera. The first performance took place in Paris on 10 July.
- In 2025, another adaptation in the spirit of The Threepenny Opera updates the setting to the Five Points neighborhood of Manhattan in the 1850's. Titled The Counterfeit Opera, it follows the original plot fairly closely but the music is almost all new.
