= Daphne Anderson =

English actress (1922–2013)

- Born: Daphne Margaret Scrutton; 27 April 1922; London, UK
- Died: 15 January 2013 (aged 90); Chichester, West Sussex, UK
- Occupations: Stage and film actress, dancer and singer
- Years active: 1949–1992
- Spouse: Lionel William Carter (1941–1996)

Daphne Anderson (born Daphne Margaret Scrutton; 27 April 1922 – 15 January 2013) was an English stage, film, and television actress, as well as a dancer and singer. She made her London theatre debut in 1938 at the Windmill Theatre. Anderson appeared in such films as The Beggar's Opera, Hobson's Choice and The Scarlet Pimpernel.

== Biography ==
Anderson was born on 27 April 1922, in London, to parents Alan Edward Scrutton and Gladys Amy Scrutton (née Juler). Her surname was originally "Scrutton", but she later changed it to "Anderson". Anderson attended Kensington High School. She married Lionel William Carter. Her aunt was the composer Mary Anderson Lucas.

== Theatrical career ==
Daphne Anderson studied dancing under Zelia Raye. She made her first stage performance in 1937 at the Richmond Theatre as a chorus member in a production of Cinderella. The following year, Anderson made her London theatre debut in the chorus of the Revudeville at the Windmill Theatre.

She played several roles in various theatrical productions of Lewis Carroll's Alice's Adventures in Wonderland. In 1943, she played Father William in a production of Alice in Wonderland and the Walrus in Alice Through the Looking-Glass, both at the Scala Theatre in London. She was a prominent member of Leonard Sachs' Players Theatre Company in London, appearing regularly at the Charing Cross Villiers Street venue and featured on recordings made there. In 1951 she appeared at the Princes Theatre in The Seventh Veil.

In 1972, she assumed the role of the Red Queen in Alice Through the Looking-Glass at the Ashcroft Theatre.

== Film and television ==
Anderson appeared in the following films:

- Trottie True (1949) - Bertha True
- The Dark Man (1951) - Fisherwoman
- Castigo Implacável (1951) - Kate
- The Beggar's Opera (1953) - Lucy Lockit
- Laughing Anne (1953) - Blonde Singer
- Hobson's Choice (1954) - Alice Hobson
- A Kid for Two Farthings (1955) - Dora
- The Prince and the Showgirl (1957) - Fanny
- No Time for Tears (1957) - Dr. Marian Cornish
- Snowball (1960) - Nora Hart
- Persuasion (1960, TV Series) - Mrs. Clay
- Stork Talk (1962) - Dr. Mary Willis
- Captain Clegg (1962) - Mrs. Rash
- Bitter Harvest (1963) - Mrs. Medwin
- The Flood (1963) - Mrs. Weathersfield
- Gideon's Way (1964-1966, TV Series) - Kate Gideon
- The Whitehall Worrier (1967, TV Series) - Mrs. Nicholson
- I Want What I Want (1972)
- Au Pair Girls (1972) - Mrs. Howard
- Minder (1979, Episode: "Come in T-64, Your Time Is Ticking Away") - Katie
- The Scarlet Pimpernel (1982, TV Movie) - Lady Grenville
- Real Life (1984) - Morality Lady

Anderson also appeared on television programmes including Thomas and Sarah and a television adaptation of The Old Curiosity Shop. In 1985, Anderson appeared in an episode of British sitcom In Sickness and in Health. She may be best remembered as Kate Gideon in the 1965 ITC series Gideon's Way.

== Death ==
Daphne Anderson died on 15 January 2013, at the age of 90.
