= Julia Migenes =

American soprano

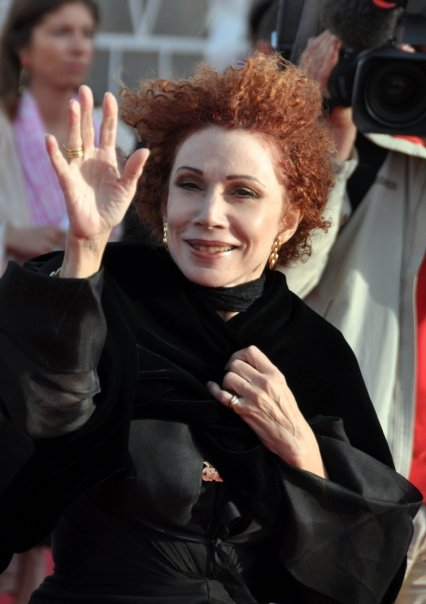
- Migenes in 2009
- Born: New York City, New York, U.S.
- Other name: Julia Migenes-Johnson
- Occupations: Actor, Singer

Julia Migenes (born March 13) is an American soprano working primarily in musical theatre repertoire. She was born on the Lower East Side of Manhattan to Juan and Julia Migenes, parents of Puerto Rican and Irish descent, respectively. (Her stepfather, Costas Makis, was of Greek descent.) She is sometimes credited as Julia Migenes-Johnson. She attended The High School of Music & Art in New York City. Migenes played Tevye's second daughter, Hodel, in the original Broadway production of the long-running musical Fiddler on the Roof. She played Ciboletta in the 1973 film Eine Nacht in Venedig (re-released 2008). She also starred in the 1984 film of Carmen.

== Early career on Broadway ==
Migenes' year of birth has been disputed with the years 1943 (supported by the 1950 United States census and by the plausibility of known milestones in her career), 1945, 1948 (which she has used), and 1949 (used in most reference sources) all being cited. As a child, Migenes performed the role of "Ngana" in the first national tour of the Rodgers and Hammerstein musical South Pacific; she alternated in the role with her sister Maria. Also in the cast were her brother, John (1940-1993), in the role of Jerome, and her half-sister, Jeanette (1926-2003), as Bloody Mary's assistant (and understudy to Bloody Mary). Reportedly, the siblings made enough money from the tour to buy their family a small house in the Bronx.

She made her Broadway debut in the musical Carnival! She was a replacement understudy for the lead role of ‘Lili.’ Migenes performed the role from April 2 to April 14, 1962, when lead actress Anna Maria Alberghetti took vacation. Migenes then took on the leading role of ‘Maria’ in the 1964 Broadway revival of West Side Story which played a limited run from April 8 to May 2, 1964, at City Center. Migenes created the role of "Hodel", the second oldest of Tevye’s daughters in the original Broadway cast of Fiddler on the Roof. While the production ran for almost eight years (lasting over 3,200 performances and winning nine Tony Awards), Migenes’ tenure extended from the production’s first preview on September 17, 1964, through April 1, 1967. Mimi Turque succeeded her in the role of Hodel.

== Personal life ==
Migenes has been married four times. The first time was in 1962 as a teenager to William L. Dean Jr., a singer with Coral Records Company and the Fred Waring Orchestra; the union was annulled in 1963. Her second marriage to Danjo Hutnik ended in divorce, but brought Migenes her first daughter, Martina Michaela (born 1974). In 1979, Migenes married Jervis Johnson, with whom she had a second daughter, Jessica Allegra (born 1981). She married Hungarian-British film director Peter Medak in 1988; they divorced in 2003.

== Selected discography ==
- Fiddler on the Roof (1964)
- Operette (1981)
- Julia Migenes sings (1981)
- Latin Lady (1982)
- Welterfolge (1983)
- A Christmas Concert (1983)
- Recital (1983)
- Carmen (1984) (movie soundtrack album)
- In Love (1985)
- Das Schonste Von Julia Migenes (AMIGA) (1987)
- Show Boat (1988)
- Berlin Blues (1988)
- The Seven Deadly Sins (1989)
- Live at the Olympia (1989)
- Mack the Knife (movie soundtrack album) (1990)
- Man of La Mancha (studio cast album) (1990, re-released 1996)
- La voix humaine (1991)
- Rags (1991)
- Kismet (1991) (studio cast album)
- Carmen (1991)
- Vienna (1993)
- Smile (with Michael Kamen) (1994)
- 100 ans de Cinema (1995)
- Lulu (1998)
- Robert Stolz (1999)
- Franz Lehár (1999)
- Infamia, Tangos de Barcelona (2000)
- La Argentina (2003)
- Le Meilleur de Julia (2004)
- Alter Ego (2006)
- Hollywood Divas (2009)

== Television ==
Migenes has also appeared on television, including appearances in: Top C's and Tiaras (1983–84) Channel 4, UK: 6 episodes (plus 2 pilot episodes) of songs from operetta and musical theatre. She also appeared in episodes of The Twilight Zone ( "Grace Note"; 1986), Webster ("Leave It to Diva"; 1987), and Magnum, P.I. ("Pleasure Principle"; 1987).

== Film ==
- Carmen (1984) as Carmen
- Berlín Blues (1988) as Lola
- Mack the Knife (1989) as Jenny Diver
- The Krays (1990) as Judy Garland (uncredited)

== Opera ==
- Lulu (Alban Berg). DVD 1980, Metropolitan Opera Co.

== See also ==
- List of Puerto Ricans
- Irish immigration to Puerto Rico
