= Happy End (musical) =

- 1977 Broadway Playbill
- Music: Kurt Weill
- Lyrics: Bertolt Brecht
- Book: Elisabeth Hauptmann
- Productions: 1929 Berlin; 1956 Munich; 1957 Hamburg; 1965 West End; 1972 Yale Repertory Theatre; 1977 Broadway; 2006 San Francisco; 2022 Victorian Opera; 2025 Teatro alla Scala

Happy End is a three-act musical comedy by Kurt Weill, Elisabeth Hauptmann, and Bertolt Brecht which first opened in Berlin at the Theater am Schiffbauerdamm on September 2, 1929. It closed after seven performances. In 1977 it premiered on Broadway, where it ran for 75 performances.

== Production history ==
After the success of Weill and Brecht's previous collaboration, The Threepenny Opera, the duo devised this musical, written by Hauptmann under the pseudonym of Dorothy Lane. Hauptmann's sources included, among others, Major Barbara. The première took place in Berlin on 2 September 1929. The story is reminiscent of, but not the source of, the better-known musical Guys and Dolls, which is based on Damon Runyon's short story, "The Idyll of Miss Sarah Brown". Brecht tried to take credit for the whole work but Hauptmann ensured that the truth was known.

The original production was not well received. There were reports that cast member Helene Weigel (Brecht's wife) read from a Communist pamphlet on stage, and the production was panned by the German press and closed two days later. Nevertheless, the musical was subsequently produced in Europe, the first time in Munich in 1956. Successive productions included Hamburg in 1957, London in 1965 at the Royal Court Theatre, Yale Repertory Theatre (US) in 1972, Oxford and the West End's Lyric Theatre in 1975 and Frankfurt in 1983, along with a 1977 German film version.

The musical premiered on Broadway at the Martin Beck Theatre on May 7, 1977, and closed on July 10, 1977, after 75 performances. Directed by Robert Kalfin and Patricia Birch and staged by Birch, the production, which had originated off-Broadway, starred Christopher Lloyd, Grayson Hall and Meryl Streep. (Lloyd was unable to perform on opening night because of a leg injury; his standby, Bob Gunton substituted for him. Lloyd played the rest of the run on crutches.)

A 1984 production by Washington D.C.'s Arena Stage was televised as part of the short-lived "America's Musical Theater" series on PBS. The musical was produced at Center Stage in Baltimore, Maryland, in February 1995, using the English adaptation by Michael Feingold (as had the Broadway and Arena Stage productions).

A production at the Pacific Resident Theatre in 2005 garnered a Los Angeles Drama Critics Circle Award for Best Revival of 2005.

A 2006 production by San Francisco's American Conservatory Theater used the English adaptation by Michael Feingold, and also had a CD cast recording. This version was performed off-off-Broadway in New York in 2007. A new production will be premiering at Teatro alla Scala in May 2025, starring Wallis Giunta and Markus Werba.

Despite the poor initial reception of the play, several musical numbers have seen continued popularity, including "Surabaya Johnny", sung by Lillian Holiday and "Bilbao Song".

== Synopsis ==
=== Act 1 ===
A gang of criminals is hanging out in Bill's Beer Hall, plotting their shakedown of a local pharmacist while waiting for their mysterious female boss named The Fly, and her top tough guy Bill Cracker. Bill arrives with a homburg hat—a trophy from Gorilla Baxley, a rival gang leader whom he has just "taken care of". The gang rejoices—Bill's Beer Hall will now be the center of crime in Chicago, as great as the original Bill's Beer Hall in Bilbao ("The Bilbao Song") says the Governor which has since gotten very bourgeois and respectable.

A policeman drops off an old lady who passed out in the street. She turns out to be The Fly in disguise, and tells them a big bank job is set for Christmas Eve, two days away. The Fly is angry that Bill murdered Baxley without her consent and signals the gang to kill him. The Fly leaves and the gang plots to frame Bill for killing the pharmacist they were planning to shake down.

A Salvation Army band begins to play out on the street ("Lieutenants of the Lord"). Sister Lilian (or Lillian) Holiday brings the band inside the bar ("March Ahead"), and begins to try to convert the gang. They try to assault her and Bill comes to her rescue. When the gang and the band leaves, Lilian stays behind with Bill and tries again to reach him, singing "The Sailors' Tango".

Brother Hannibal returns with the band and is shocked at Lilian's behavior. After finding Bill's gun there, the police burst in and arrest Bill for the murder of the pharmacist in his shop.

=== Act 2 ===
At the Canal Street Mission, Major Stone is questioning Lilian's actions. She sings a reprise of "The Sailors' Tango". The police come to take Lilian's statement. She gives Bill an alibi: she was alone with him in the bar when the murder was committed. Brother Hannibal faints—the result of an old head injury—and the Major relieves Lilian of all her duties and tosses her out of the mission. The service begins ("Brother Give Yourself a Shove") and Sisters Jane and Mary, who are left to deliver Lilian's sermon, fail miserably.

Meanwhile, back at Bill's Beerhall, the Governor, The Fly's new second in command, tells BabyFace that The Fly had made a secret deal with Gorilla Baxley to take over his gang which is now off. He gives BabyFace advice on being tough ("Song of the Big Shot").

Back at the Mission, Bill arrives at the end of the service ("Don't Be Afraid") looking for Lilian. Sam from the gang is there and tells him Lilian is gone as Hannibal sings the final hymn ("In Our Childhood's Bright Endeavor").

Lilian comes to the bar looking for Bill. Sam runs in saying Bill is out of jail and at the Mission looking for Lilian. The Governor gets his gun and goes to the Mission. Hannibal is singing "The Liquor Dealer's Dream". The Governor and Bill go out the door. There are sounds of a fight, a gunshot, and a splash. Bill runs in interrupting the last refrain. "Sing that last chorus again," he cries and jumps out the window just as Lilian comes through the front door.

=== Act 3 ===
Christmas Eve—Bill and the gang are preparing for the big bank job. The Professor is fiddling with some sort of two way radio and Sam is dressed as a woman. They joke with Sam who sings "The Mandalay Song".

The Fly's voice comes over the radio and gives the gang their instructions. Bill will be in charge of grabbing the money. As the gang leaves, Lilian enters. She is disappointed Bill has gone back to his life of crime ("Surabaya Johnny").

Bill cries at her song but says he's still tough ("Big Shot Reprise"). The Fly comes in disguised as a newsboy. Bill recognises her and realises he's almost missed the hold up. He runs out and Lilian storms out behind him.

The gang returns but Bill is nowhere to be found. The Fly puts the hit out on him again. "Take care of him tonight and leave worrying about the money till tomorrow" ("The Ballad of the Lily of Hell"). Lilian returns to the Mission and so does Bill. The Major wants nothing to do with either of them. The gang rushes in. Bill shows them he has the money. A cop comes in and the gang offers up the false alibis The Fly had given them. But the cop is there to question Bill about the disappearance of The Governor. The door flies open and The Governor walks in ("Big Shot Reprise 2"). He had only hit his head falling into a shallow part of the canal. Everyone is innocent so the policeman leaves.

Now The Fly comes in, gun drawn. Hannibal shouts "Sadie!" It turns out that he is the Fly's long lost husband ("In our Childhood Reprise"). She gives him the loot which he turns over to the Major. The Major gives Lilian her job back. The Fly steps forward and says the two groups should unite to fight for the poor against the injustices of the rich ("Epilogue: Hosanna Rockefeller"). A drunken Santa Claus appears at an upstairs window and the whole group reprise "The Bilbao Song".

== Musical numbers ==
Prologue – The Company

Act 1

Bill's Beer Hall, December 22

- "The Bilbao Song" – The Governor, Baby Face, Bill & The Gang
- "Lieutenants of the Lord" – Lillian, The Army & The Fold
- "March Ahead" – The Army & The Fold
- "The Sailors' Tango" – Lillian

Act 2

The Salvation Army Mission, Canal Street, and the Beer Hall, December 23

- "The Sailors' Tango" (Reprise) – Lillian
- "Brother, Give Yourself a Shove" – The Army & The Fold
- "Song of the Big Shot" – The Governor
- "Don't Be Afraid" – Jane, The Army & The Fold
- "In Our Childhood's Bright Endeavor" – Hannibal
- "The Liquor Dealer's Dream" – Hannibal, The Governor, Jane, The Army & The Fold

Act 3

Scene 1: The Beer Hall, December 24

- "The Mandalay Song" – Sam & The Gang
- "Surabaya Johnny" – Lillian
- "Song of the Big Shot" (Reprise) – Bill
- "Ballad of the Lily of Hell" – The Fly

Scene 2: The Mission, later that night

- "Song of the Big Shot" (Reprise) – The Governor & Bill
- "In Our Childhood's Bright Endeavor" (Reprise) – Hannibal & The Fly
- "Epilogue: Hosanna Rockefeller" – The Company
- "The Bilbao Song" (Reprise) – The Company

== Quotation ==
The phrase "robbing a bank is no crime compared to owning one" comes from this play, and Brecht subsequently added it to publication revisions of the earlier Threepenny Opera, although it did not originally appear in the first production.

== Recordings ==
Conductor/Lilian/Dame in Grau/Bill/Sam:

- Brückner-Rüggeberg/Lenya/Lenya/Lenya/Lenya (1960, orig. on Philips; Lenya sings all songs)
- Atherton/Dickinson/Dickinson/Luxon/Luxon (1975, Deutsche Grammophon; songs in true pitch)
- Latham-König/Ramm/Ploog/Raffeiner/Kimbrough (live in Cologne, 1988, Capriccio)
- Constantine Kitsopoulos/Charlotte Cohn/Linda Mugleston/Peter J. Macon/Jack Willis (live in San Francisco, 2006, Ghostlight Records; the American Conservatory Theater production

== Awards and nominations ==
=== Original Broadway production ===
Year	Award Ceremony	Category	Nominee	Result
1977	Tony Award	Best Musical		Nominated
1977	Tony Award	Best Book of a Musical	Elisabeth Hauptmann	Nominated
1977	Tony Award	Best Original Score	Kurt Weill and Bertolt Brecht	Nominated
1977	Drama Desk Award	Outstanding Musical		Nominated
1977	Drama Desk Award	Outstanding Actress in a Musical	Meryl Streep	Nominated
