= Elisabeth Hauptmann =

German writer (1897–1973)

Elisabeth Hauptmann (20 June 1897, Peckelsheim, Westphalia, German Empire – 20 April 1973, East Berlin) was a German writer who worked with fellow German playwright and director Bertolt Brecht.

She got to know Brecht in 1922, the same year she came to Berlin. She worked as a secretary for the German-American poet and writer Herman George Scheffauer. She began collaborating with Brecht in 1924, and is listed as co-author of The Threepenny Opera (1928). She purportedly wrote the majority of the text as well as providing a German translation of John Gay's The Beggar's Opera, on which the musical play is based, as working material for Brecht and Kurt Weill, the composer. She reportedly wrote at least half of the Mahagonny-Songspiel, but was not credited. She was the main text author of the musical comedy Happy End (1929).

Because of the rise of Nazism, Hauptmann went into exile in the United States from 1934 to 1949, marrying German composer and conductor Paul Dessau in 1943. After Brecht's death in 1956, she published works of his at Suhrkamp Verlag, a German publishing house, and worked as a dramaturg for the Berlin Ensemble.

In 1961, she received the Lessing Award, which the Ministry for Culture (East Germany) awarded every year. She made a German version of He hanshan (The Confronted undershirt), a Yuan Dynasty-era Chinese play. In 1977, a collection of her works was published under the title Julia ohne Romeo (Julia without Romeo).

== Sources ==
- Hanssen, Paula. Elisabeth Hauptmann: Brecht's Silent Collaborator. New York University/Ottendorfer, Book 46, 1995; ISBN 9783906753119. 173pp.
- Tian, Min. The Poetics of Difference and Displacement: Twentieth-Century Chinese-Western Intercultural Theatre. Hong Kong University Press, 1 June 2008; ISBN 9622099076/ISBN 9789622099074.
