= Jenny Diver =

Irish pickpocket (c.1700–1741)

- Born: Mary Young; 1700; Ireland
- Died: 18 March 1741 (aged 40–41); London
- Occupation: Pickpocket

Jenny Diver, née Mary Young (c.1700 – 18 March 1741) was an Irish pickpocket, one of the most famous of her day.

== Background and migration to England ==
Born around 1700 in Ireland, Diver was the illegitimate daughter of an unknown father and the lady's maid Harriet Jones. After her mother deserted her, Diver grew up in various foster homes. She was a skilled seamstress, and eventually emigrated to London, where she became an apprentice of Anne Murphy, who was the leader of a gang of pickpockets. She soon became so skilled as a thief that she became the leader of Murphy's gang and nicknamed Jenny Diver.

== Appearance, personality and criminal technique ==
Jenny Diver was described as attractive, educated and well dressed, and was able to mix among wealthy people without attracting suspicion. Perhaps the best known of her methods was to feign illness, during which she robbed people and handed over the objects to her accomplices. She would also use false arms which made it possible for her to rob people with her arms seemingly visible in her lap.

== Arrests and execution ==
On two occasions, in 1733 and 1738, Diver was arrested, gave the court a false name with no criminal record, and was sentenced to penal transportation as a first-time criminal. On both occasions, she bribed the captain on the prison ship to allow her a comfortable travel with her property, bribed the governor in Virginia to relieve her of her sentence, and bribed the captain to take her back to London again. On 10 January 1741, she was arrested for the third time, but this time she was correctly identified and could not give a false name. She was apprehended with one accomplice, Elizabeth Davies, while trying to steal the purse from the pocket of a woman whom a male accomplice offered to help over a pool of water (the man managed to escape).

Jenny Diver defended both herself and Davies by character witnesses. She was accused not only of theft but also of having returned after deportation, which was a capital crime. Both were sentenced to death, and claimed without success to be pregnant, but while Davies was deported, Diver's sentence was not commuted. Due to her notoriety as a famous criminal, she was taken to her execution in a mourning carriage. She was executed with 19 other condemned, but she was the only one taken there separately. She was dressed in a black dress and hat with veil, and reportedly behaved with composure.

== Legacy ==
- Diver was the inspiration for the role of the same name in John Gay's 1728 The Beggar's Opera and then for Pirate Jenny in the 1928 The Threepenny Opera by Hauptmann/Brecht/Weill.
- The first chapter of Alan Moore's graphic novel The League of Extraordinary Gentlemen, Volume III: Century, "What Keeps Mankind Alive?" (a reference to the song of the same name in The Threepenny Opera), features a character named Janni Dakkar, the daughter of Captain Nemo, who abandons her father's island base and makes her way to England, adopting the alias "Jenny Diver" (the first word being an Anglicization of her Indian name, and the second referring to her aptitude for swimming and free diving). In the climax of the chapter, two characters sing "Pirate Jenny" as the crew of the Nautilus pillage London's docks under Janni/Jenny's direction.
