= Josef Szeiler =

Austrian theatre director

Josef Szeiler (7 August 1948 in Sankt Michael im Burgenland) is an Austrian theatre director. As co-founder of the group Theater Angelus Novus he is first of all known for his experimental approach to texts by Heiner Müller, Bertolt Brecht, Homer and Greek dramas.

== Overview ==
Josef Szeiler was born in Sankt Michael im Burgenland. At the end of the 1970s he worked as guest assistant for Benno Besson at the Volksbühne Berlin where he met the playwright Heiner Müller, who became a lifelong friend.

Josef Szeiler's first theatre project in Vienna was Die Schlacht by Heiner Müller. Out of this project arose the group TheaterAngelusNovus which focused on a continuous reflection of theatrical aspects (“Selbstverständigung”) rather than producing small packages of ready made performances that could be consumed in a traditional setting. Still there were regular projects that were also publicly accessible, like the reading of the Iliad in its entire length which was held 1986 at the Vienna Künstlerhaus. The text was read in German in parallel tracks both by members of the group and visitors and also by scholars in the original Greek version. The doors were open during the entire production; people could come and leave, sleep, eat or participate in the readings.

After the split-up of TheaterAngelusNovus in 1988 Josef Szeiler conducted several projects without formal group, such as „FatzerMaterial. Vom Theater ist daher zu Sagen, was man vom Körper sagt“ with Monika Meister at the Institute for Theatre Science at the University of Vienna which focused on aspects of theatre documentation; or HamletMaschine.TokioMaterial, a production of Heiner Müller's Hamletmachine in Tokyo which ran in parallel to a Japanese adaptation of Shakespeare's Hamlet.

In 1995 Szeiler produced Heiner Müller’s Philoktet with the painter and stage designer Mark Lammert at the Berliner Ensemble, which was the last theatre production Heiner Müller saw.

In 1998 Josef Szeiler co-founded the group Theaterkombinat Wien, which in 1999-2000 produced MassakerMykene at the abattoir St. Marx in Vienna, working with Bertolt Brecht’s Fatzer Fragment and The Oresteia by Aeschylus.

One of his latest production was in 2006-2007 with the group „Konfiguration – Jenseits des Todes“ at the „Stadt des Kindes“ in Vienna which worked with all antique related texts by Heiner Müller as partial realization of a project involving all texts by the author, which was originally planned for 1996 but was not realized then following the death of the Author.

== Postdramatic theatre ==
An important aspect of Szeiler's approach to the theatre is his use of time, based on the understanding that the usual rhythm of theatrical production (2–3 months of preparation followed by 2 hour evening performances) serves more to confirm the social status quo than helping to raise questions. Apart from that his work is characterized by the abolishment of the divide between actors and visitors as a consequent continuation of Bertolt Brecht’s Learning Play approach. However, in contrast to the work of Augusto Boal or Reiner Steinweg, who focus heavily on the pedagogical aspects, it is aesthetical aspects that dominate in Szeiler's work in which responding to architecture and working with the human body in the theatrical space feature heavily. Productions took place e.g. in a repair hall of the Austrian Federal Train services or the abattoir St. Marx in Vienna.

The German theatre critic Hans-Thies Lehmann identified the works by TheaterAngelusNovus and Josef Szeiler as important representations of what he termed postdramatic theatre, in which no longer the representation of the dramatic text is the main focus, but rather self-reflection of the medium theatre. Other examples of postdramatic theatre are Robert Wilson, Jan Fabre, Robert Lepage, Frank Castorf, La Fura dels Baus and the Viennese Actionism.

== Theatre as the art of the social ==
Another important aspect of Szeiler's work is the development of the theatrical chorus derived from the antique Greek tragedy. Other than with the musical choir, which is usually directed by a central conductor, the chorus is envisaged here as a homogeneous organism, which finds its position, rhythm and movement in spontaneous response to the given situation. This does demand the capability of the individual members to continuously and repeatedly synchronize themselves with the group and react to situations. Training includes refinement of perception and social understanding.

The approach in concrete productions was likened to the ones of soccer players who practice positions and movements in training which may or may not work the same way in a match and rely on the capability to adapt to situations at hand.

== Projects ==
Heiner Müller, Die Schlacht

With TheaterAngelusNovus (1981 – 1988)

Samuel Beckett, Endspiel

Heiner Müller, HamletMaschine

Aischylos, Prometheus (1983)

Bertolt Brecht, FatzerMaterial – Fragment (1985)

3-Year-Project ORESTIE (1986-1988): Part 1 – HomerLesen Part 2 – Tod des Hektor Part 3 – Wien/Moskau/Chabarowsk/Moskau/Wien (Theater project in the Trans-Siberian Railway)

Without Specific Group

FatzerMaterial –Theater/documentation project at the Institut for Theatre Science at the University of Vienna (1988/89).

Menschenmaterial 1. Die Maßnahme . Theater project at the Akademie der Künste in Berlin (1990).

Heiner Müller: Hamletmaschine. Theater project von in Tokyo (1992).

Heiner Müller: Philoktet (Berliner Ensemble 1995).

With Theaterkombinat Wien

MassakerMykene (1999 – 2000)

With Konfiguration – Jenseits des Todes

Jenseits des Todes - hm3 (2007)

== Bibliography ==
- FatzerMaterial.- Wien, Köln: Böhlau 1990 (= Maske und Kothurn, Jg. 34, H. 1–4, 1988).
- Haas, Aziza: TheaterAngelusNovus. Antikenmaterial VI. Tod des Hektor. In: Maske und Kothurn. Internationale Beiträge zur Theaterwissenschaft. 36. Jahrgang/1990, Heft 1–4.
- Haas, Aziza u. Szeiler, Josef (Hrsg.): Menschenmaterial 1. Die Maßnahme. Berlin 1991.
- Haas, Aziza (Hrsg.): HamletMaschine.Tokyo.Material. Berlin 1996.
- Hans-Thies Lehmann: Das postdramatische Theater. Verlag der Autoren 1999.
