= The Mission (play) =

Postmodern drama by Heiner Müller

Debuisson in Jamaica
Between black breasts
In Paris Robespierre
His jaw broken.
Or Jeanne d'Arc when the angel failed to appear
The angels always fail to appear in the end
MOUNTAIN OF FLESH DANTON CAN'T GIVE
MEAT TO THE STREET
LOOK LOOK AT THE FLESH IN THE
STREET
THE HUNT FOR RED DEER IN THE YELLOW
SHOES
Christ. The Devil showed him the kingdoms of the world
THROW OFF YOUR CROSS AND ALL WILL BE THINE.
In the time of treason
The landscapes are beautiful.

— Heiner Müller, "Theme of A.S." (1958), anticipating many of the ideas and images developed in The Mission.

The Mission: Memory of a Revolution (Der Auftrag: Erinnerungen an eine Revolution), also known as The Task, is a postmodern drama by the (formerly East) German playwright Heiner Müller. The play was written and first published in 1979. Müller and his wife Ginka Cholakova co-directed its first theatrical production in 1980, at the intimate 'Theatre im 3.Stock' studio space of the Volksbühne in Berlin (opening on 16 November). Müller also directed a full-house production in 1982 at the Bochum Theatre in West Germany.

== Dramatic structure ==
Composed with a "collage-like" dramaturgical structure, the play stages intertextual relationships with a range of classics from the modern theatre, each dealing with the models and ethics of revolutionary action: Brecht's The Decision (1930), Büchner's Danton's Death (1835), and Genet's The Blacks (1958), among others. The play also uses motifs from Anna Seghers' story "The Light on the Gallows" (which Müller had treated in a poem of 1958) and, Müller adds, "biographical events are involved, a trip to Mexico among others that was very important for me in connection with the play." In addition to its dramatic and often self-consciously theatrical scenes, the play is punctured by several lyrical and narrative elements.

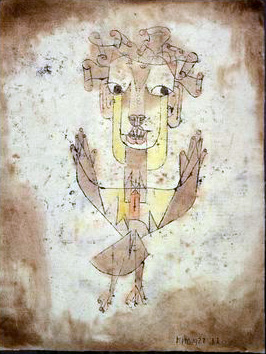
Paul Klee's Angelus novus (1920), used by the philosopher Walter Benjamin as an image for his 'angel of history' ("the course of human history as a path of accumulating destruction which 'the angel' views with horror but from which he cannot turn away"), which Müller transforms into 'the Angel of Despair' in The Mission: "With my hands I dispense ecstacy, numbness, oblivion, the lust and the torment of bodies."

A lengthy narrative section bisects the play, arriving unmotivated within the immediate terms of a traditional dramatic logic. It is written in the first person as a 'stream of consciousness' but it lacks a discernible character-assigning speech-heading (this strategy, which leaves the text 'open' or 'writable' in Barthes' terms, is characteristic of Müller's dramaturgy). Adopting a 'Kafkaesque', subjective perspective (the outlook, as Brecht put it, "of a man caught under the wheels"), the protagonist of this section narrates a nightmarish dream sequence in which time and space become unhinged and dislocated as he travels in an elevator to receive, he anticipates with both pride and alarm, an important mission from the 'boss' ("whom I refer to in my mind" he says with epistrophic emphasis, "as No. 1"). While recalling Kafka's similar dislocations of time (in "Give It Up!", for example) and the subjective anxieties and alienated horrors of the expressionist drama, this section also has a more directly referential origin; in a prefatory note taken originally from his autobiography, Müller explains that:

"[a]n experience that became a part of this text is one of my approaches to Honecker in the House of the Central Committee, going up in the paternoster. On every floor a soldier with a machine gun sat opposite the entrance to the paternoster. The House of the Central Committee was a high security jail for the captives of power."

The play's structure, in which these different texts and experiences are articulated, is complex. "[T]he form or dramaturgy of my plays," Müller explains, "results from my relation to the material" (a relation which Brecht would call a 'Gestus'). He goes on to suggest that it may be the play's activation of many different historical periods (his own 'post-revolutionary' time, the late twenties of Brecht's Lehrstücke, that of post-revolutionary France) that has produced its collage-like "deviation from some dramaturgical norm." Müller links his dramaturgical experimentation explicitly with the attempt, given its most programmatic formulation by Strindberg eighty years earlier, to render a dream-logic in dramatic terms:

"I have always been interested in the structure of stories within dreams, how it is free of transitions, and associations are overlooked. The contrasts create acceleration. The whole effort of writing is to achieve the quality of my own dreams. Independence from interpretation, too. Faulkner's best texts have this quality."

== Works cited ==
- Benjamin, Walter. 1973. Understanding Brecht. Trans. Anna Bostock. London and New York: Verso. ISBN 0-902308-99-8.
- Kafka, Franz. 1994. Collected Stories. Ed. and trans. Gabriel Josipovici. Everyman's Library Ser. London: David Campbell. ISBN 1-85715-145-3.
- Müller, Heiner. 1979a. The Task. In Hamletmachine and Other Texts for the Stage. Ed. and trans. Carl Weber. New York: Performing Arts Journal Publications, 1984. ISBN 0-933826-45-1. pp. 81–101
- Müller, Heiner. 1979b. The Mission. In Theatremachine. Ed. and trans. Marc von Henning. London and Boston: Faber, 1995. ISBN 0-571-17528-7. pp. 59–84.
- Müller, Heiner. 2001. A Heiner Müller Reader: Plays | Poetry | Prose. Ed. and trans. Carl Weber. PAJ Books Ser. Baltimore and London: The Johns Hopkins University Press. ISBN 0-8018-6578-6.
- Strindberg, August. 1991. Author's Note to A Dream Play. In Strindberg: Plays Two. Trans. Michael Meyer. London: Methuen. ISBN 0-413-49750-X. p. 174.
- Weber, Carl. 1984. Note on The Task. In Hamletmachine and Other Texts for the Stage. by Heiner Müller. New York: Performing Arts Journal Publications, 1984. ISBN 0-933826-45-1. pp. 82–83
