= The Decision (play) =

1930 work by Bertolt Brecht

The Decision/The Measures Taken
- Original title: Die Maßnahme
- Original language: German
- Written by: Bertolt Brecht
- Music by: Hanns Eisler
- Genre: Lehrstück, agitprop

Premiere
- Date: 10 December 1930
- Place: Großes Schauspielhaus, Berlin
- Directed by: Slatan Dudow

The Decision (Die Maßnahme), frequently translated as The Measures Taken, is a Lehrstück and agitprop cantata by the twentieth-century German dramatist Bertolt Brecht. Created in collaboration with composer Hanns Eisler and director Slatan Dudow, it consists of eight sections in prose and unrhymed, free verse, with six major songs. A note to the text by all three collaborators describes it as an "attempt to use a didactic piece to make familiar an attitude of positive intervention."

== Plot ==
Four agitators from Moscow return from a successful mission in China and are congratulated for their efforts by a central committee (called The Control Chorus.) The four agitators, however, inform the committee that during their mission they were forced to kill a young comrade for their mission to succeed. They ask for judgment from the committee on their actions. The committee withholds its verdict until after the four agitators re-enact the events that led to the young comrade's death.

The four agitators tell of how they were sent on a mission to educate and help organize the workers in China. At a party house (the last before they reach the frontiers of China) they meet an enthusiastic young comrade, who offers to join them as their guide. The agitators must hide their identities because educating and organizing the workers in China is illegal. The director of the party house (the last before the frontier) helps the four agitators and the young comrade in the obliteration of their true identities. They all put on masks in order to appear as Chinese. They are told to keep concealed that they are communist. Their mission must remain a secret. Should they be discovered, the authorities will attack the organization and the entire movement; not merely the lives of the four agitators and the young comrade will be put in danger. The agitators and the young comrade all agree to these conditions.

However, once in China, the sights of injustice and oppression enrages the young comrade and he is not able to contain his passion, immediately acting to correct the wrongs he sees around him. He shows no discretion in teaching the oppressed how to help themselves and has no tact when dealing with small-time oppressors to help the greater good of the revolution. As a result, he eventually exposes himself and the four agitators by ripping off his mask and proclaiming the teachings of the party. When he does this, he puts the entire mission and movement in danger. He is identified, unmasked, just as riots break out and a revolutionary uprising among the workers is beginning. The authorities are now in pursuit of the young comrade and his friends. Still shouting out against the party, the young comrade is struck in the head by one of the agitators and they carry him as far away as they could, to the nearby lime pits. There, the agitators debate on what to do with him.

If they help him to escape they will be unable to help the uprising, and escape is near impossible from their current position anyway. If he is left behind and caught, his mere identity will unwittingly betray the movement. The four agitators realize that "he must vanish, and vanish completely/ For we can neither take him with us nor leave him." To save the movement, they conclude that their only solution is for the young comrade to die and be thrown in the lime pits where he will be burned and become unrecognizable. They ask him for his consent to this. The young comrade agrees to his fate in the interest of revolutionizing the world and in the interest of communism. He asks the four agitators to help him with his death. They shoot him and throw his body into the lime pit.

The central committee (The Control Chorus), to whom the four agitators have been telling their story, agree with their actions and reassures them that they have made the correct decision. "You've helped to disseminate / Marxism's teachings and the / ABC of Communism," they assure the four agitators. They also mark the sacrifice and cost that the wider success entailed: "At the same time your report shows how much / Is needed if our world is to be altered."

Note: The "ABC of Communism" is a reference to the popular book by Nikolai Bukharin.

== Translations ==
The most common translation for the title, Die Maßnahme, in English is The Measures Taken. The only translation titled The Decision is by John Willett.

The first known published English-language translation of Die Maßnahme is the inaccurate and libelous version of the cantata, titled The Rule [or Doctrine]. This version of the text was made specifically for the House Un-American Activities Committee for use when interrogating both Bertolt Brecht and Hanns Eisler. The text is derived from the Eisler score published by Universal Edition and was made by Elizabeth Hanunian on September 18, 1947. The full translation is available in the Thunder's Mouth Press/Nation Books book: Thirty Years of Treason (New York, 2002) edited by Eric Bentley. [Note: First published by The Viking Press, Inc. in 1971.]

Eric Bentley himself made two published translations of Die Maßnahme, both as The Measures Taken. The two different translations corresponded to two different German versions of the text. The first appeared in the Bentley edited collection of plays The Modern Theatre volume 6 (New York, 1960.) The second was published in a Grove Press collection of Brecht plays The Jewish Wife and Other Short Plays (New York, 1967.) Bentley also made verse translations to be sung for selected pieces from Die Maßnahme as sheet music to directly correspond to the Eisler score in The Brecht-Eisler Songbook, published by Oak Publications (New York, 1967.)

Carl R. Mueller translated Die Maßnahme as The Measures Taken in the Brecht collection The Measures Taken and Other Lehrstücke edited by John Willett and Ralph Manheim, first published by Methuen (London, 1977) and later by Arcade Publishing (New York, 2001.)

John Willett translated Die Maßnahme as The Decision specifically to fit the Eisler score. This translation was published by Methuen Drama in Brecht's Collected Plays: Three (London, 1998.)

== Score ==
Hanns Eisler's score for Die Maßnahme calls for a tenor soloist, three speakers/actors, a mixed choir (SATB) and a small orchestra. The score involves choral pieces, speaking choir, recitatives and songs.

== Production history ==
The cantata, Die Maßnahme, was scheduled to be performed at the Neue Musik Festival in Berlin in the summer of 1930. The festival directorate (consisting of Paul Hindemith, Heinrich Burkard and Gerhard Schuenemann) asked Brecht to submit the text for inspection, concerned with its radically political subject matter. Brecht refused and suggested that Hindemith resign, protesting the implication of censorship. The piece was rejected by the festival directors citing the "artistic mediocrity of the text."

Brecht and Eisler wrote an open letter to the festival directors. In it they propose an alternative venue for their new work. "We render these important activities wholly independent, and let them be managed by those for whom they are intended and who alone have use for them: the workers' choirs, amateur theater groups, school choirs and school orchestras – in short, the people who do not want to pay for art, who do not want to be paid for art, but who want to create art."

Die Maßnahme, thus, received its first theatrical production at the Großes Schauspielhaus in Berlin on the 10 December 1930. The performers who appeared as The Four Agitators in the premier were: A. M. Topitz (as the tenor soloist), Ernst Busch, Alexander Granach, and Helene Weigel (who took on the role of The Young Comrade.) Karl Rankl conducted and the Arbeiterchor of Groß-Berlin (Worker's choir of Greater Berlin) served as The Control Chorus. The performance was directed by the Bulgarian filmmaker, Slatan Dudow.

The play was also produced in Moscow around 1934.

The opera was given its first post-war performance by a chamber orchestra – the Phoenix Ensemble and the Pro Musica Chorus, conducted by Robert Ziegler in the Union Chapel, Islington, London, on election night 1987. 39 critics attended the performance and wrote it up and the BBC requested that the entire opera be recorded and subsequently broadcast on Radio 3.

Heiner Müller, a postmodern dramatist from the former East Germany who ran Brecht's Berliner Ensemble for a short time, used the Lehrstück style and storytelling of The Decision as a model when writing his plays Mauser (1970) and The Mission: Memory of a Revolution (1979).

The Decision/The Measures Taken influenced South African playwright, Maishe Maponya, when writing his play, The Hungry Earth, about labor and apartheid in 1978.

== Brecht and his critics ==
Brecht wrote the play in 1930. Since then, some critics have seen the play as an apologia for totalitarianism and mass murder while others have pointed out that it is a play about the tactics and techniques of clandestine agitation.

Brecht was not attracted by the workers' movement—with which he was never acquainted—but by a profound need of total authority, of total submission to a total power, the immutable, hierarchical Church of the new Byzantine state, based on the infallibility of its chief

— Herbert Lüthy, Du Pauvre Bertold Brecht. 1953

They have also pointed out that it is thematically similar to his 1926 poem, "Verwisch die Spuren", ("Cover Your Tracks"), that his friend Walter Benjamin saw as "an instruction for the illegal agent." Elisabeth Hauptmann told controversial Brecht biographer John Fuegi that "she had written a substantial portion of it," but had forgotten to list herself as co-author. Ruth Fischer, the sister of Hanns Eisler, denounced Brecht, as "The minstrel of the G.P.U.". She also viewed the play as a foreshadowing of the Stalinist purges and was among its harshest critics. Katerina Clark wrote that the play "is a contender for being more Stalinist in this respect than Stalinist literature itself where writers deftly avoided explicit mention of the brutality of a purge."

In his journals, Brecht, however, relates how he had rejected explicitly that interpretation, referring the accusers to a closer scrutiny of the actual text; "[I] reject the interpretation that the subject is disciplinary murder by pointing out that it is a question of self-extinction", he writes, continuing: "I admit that the basis of my plays is Marxist and state that plays, especially with an historical content, cannot be written intelligently in any other framework."

The play was praised as inspirational by Ulrike Meinhof, one of the leaders of German left-wing terrorist organization Red Army Faction. She frequently quoted one of the passages, that in her opinion served as justification for the acts of violence:

It is a terrible thing to kill.
But not only others would we kill,
but ourselves too if need be
Since only force can alter this
Murderous world, as
Every living creature knows.

== Banning the play ==
Brecht and his family banned the play from public performance, but, in fact, the Soviet government did not like the play and other governments banned it as well. Performances resumed in 1997 with Klaus Emmerich's historically rigorous staging at the Berliner Ensemble.

== US government ==
=== FBI ===
The F.B.I. translated the play in the 1940s, and titled it The Disciplinary Measure. The report described it as promoting "Communist World Revolution by violent means."

=== House Committee on Un-American Activities ===
Brecht appeared before the Committee on October 30, 1947. Only three members of the Committee and Robert E. Stripling, the committee's chief investigator were present. Brecht wanted no attorney, and unlike the previous ten witnesses, was charming, friendly and seemingly cooperative.

The committee tried to trick him by reading some of his more revolutionary plays and poems, but he was able to dismiss those questions by saying they were bad translations. Some of his answers were cleverly evasive, such as when he was asked about Comintern agent Grigory Kheifets. At one point, he stated that he had never joined the Communist party. Despite Brecht's extensive support for Communism, most authors agree that he really had not officially joined the party.

Brecht was asked specific questions about The Decision. He said it was an adaption of an old Japanese religious play. When asked if the play was about the murder of a Communist party member by his comrades "because it was in the best interest of the Communist party", he said that that was "not quite" right, pointing out that the member's death is voluntary, so it is basically an assisted suicide rather than a murder. He compared that to the tradition of hara-kiri in the Japanese play.

The interrogators suggested that the title of the play (German Die Maßnahme) could be translated as "The Disciplinary Measure". During his testimony, Brecht objected to this title, and argued that a more correct translation of the title would have been "Steps to Be Taken".

The committee went lightly on him despite frequently interrupting his answers. At the end, Committee chairman J. Parnell Thomas said, "Thank you very much. You are a good example ..." The next day, Brecht left the United States for good and returned to Europe, eventually taking up residence in East Germany.

Brecht was embarrassed by Parnell's compliment but said the committee was not as bad as the Nazis. The committee let him smoke. The Nazis would never have let him do this. Brecht smoked a cigar during the hearings. He told Eric Bentley that this let him "manufacture pauses" between their questions and his answers.

Examples of Brecht's testimony about The Decision include:

Brecht: This play is the adaptation of an old religious Japanese play and is called Nō Play, and follows quite closely this old story which shows the devotion for an ideal until death.
Stripling: What was that ideal, Mr Brecht?
Brecht: The idea in the old play was a religious idea. This young people –
Stripling: Did it have to do with the Communist Party?
Brecht: Yes.
Stripling: And discipline within the Communist Party?
Brecht: Yes, yes, it is a new play, an adaptation.
—"From the Testimony of Bertolt Brecht"

The interrogators ask explicitly about the death of the young comrade:

Stripling: Now, Mr Brecht, will you tell the committee whether or not one of the characters in this play was murdered by his comrade because it was in the best interest of the party, of the Communist Party; is that true?
Brecht: No, it is not quite according to the story.
Stripling: Because he would not bow to discipline he was murdered by his comrades, isn't that true?
Brecht: No; it is not really in it. You will find when you read it carefully, like in the old Japanese play where other ideas were at stake, this young man who died was convinced that he had done damage to the mission he believed in and he agreed to that and he was about ready to die in order not to make greater such damage. So, he asks his comrades to help him, and all of them together help him to die. He jumps into an abyss and they lead him tenderly to that abyss, and that is the story.
Chairman: I gather from your remarks, from your answer, that he was just killed, he was not murdered?
Brecht: He wanted to die.
Chairman: So they killed him?
Brecht: No; they did not kill him – not in this story. He killed himself. They supported him, but of course they had told him it were better when he disappeared for him and them and the cause he also believed in.
—"From the Testimony of Bertolt Brecht"

== Similarly themed, contemporary works ==
Revolution in China was a theme soon taken up by other contemporary writers, including:

- Whittaker Chambers, "You Have Seen the Heads," New Masses (1931)
- André Malraux, La Condition humaine (1933), published as Man's Fate (1934)

== Bibliography ==
- Brecht, Bertolt. 1993. Journals 1934–1955. Trans. Hugh Rorrison. Ed. John Willett. Bertolt Brecht: Plays, Poetry, Prose Ser. London and New York: Routledge, 1996. ISBN 0-415-91282-2.
- ---. 1997. The Decision. In Collected Plays: Three. Ed. and trans. John Willett. Brecht Collected Plays Ser. London: Methuen. ISBN 0-413-70460-2. pp. 61–91.
- Demetz, Peter, ed. (1962). "From the Testimony of Berthold Brecht: Hearings of the House Committee on Un-American Activities, October 30, 1947". Brecht: A Collection of Critical Essays. Twentieth Century Views. Eaglewood Cliffs, New Jersey: Prentice Hall. pp. 30–42. ISBN 0-13-081760-0.
- Friedrich, Otto. 1995. Before the Deluge, A Portrait of Berlin in the 1920s. HarperPrennial. ISBN 0-06-092679-1.
- Fuegi, John. 1987 Bertolt Brecht: Chaos, according to Plan. Cambridge: Cambridge University Press. ISBN 0-521-28245-4
- Müller, Heiner. 1995. The Mission. In Theatremachine. Ed. and trans. Marc von Henning. London and Boston: Faber. ISBN 0-571-17528-7. pp. 59–84.
- Müller, Heiner. 2001. Mauser. In A Heiner Müller Reader: Plays | Poetry | Prose. Ed. and trans. Carl Weber. PAJ Books Ser. Baltimore and London: The Johns Hopkins University Press. ISBN 0-8018-6578-6. pp. 93–107.
- Thomson, Peter. 1994. "Brecht's Lives". In Thomson and Sacks (1994, 22–39).
- Thomson, Peter and Glendyr Sacks, eds. 1994. The Cambridge Companion to Brecht. Cambridge Companions to Literature Ser. Cambridge: Cambridge University Press. ISBN 0-521-41446-6.
- Willett, John. 1959. The Theatre of Bertolt Brecht: A Study from Eight Aspects. London: Methuen. ISBN 0-413-34360-X.
