= Der Jasager =

- Schuloper by Kurt Weill
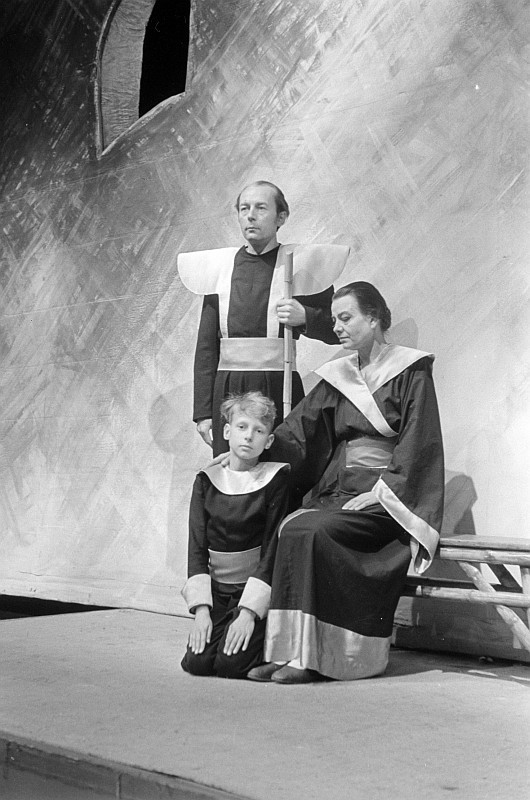
- Scene from a 1946 performance in Berlin
- Translation: The Affirmer
- Librettist: Bertolt Brecht
- Language: German
- Based on: Nō drama Taniko
- Premiere: 23 June 1930; Zentralinstitut für Erziehung und Unterricht, Berlin

Der Jasager (literally The Yes Sayer; also translated as The Affirmer or He Said Yes) is an opera (specifically a Schuloper or "school-opera") by Kurt Weill to a German libretto by Bertolt Brecht (after Elisabeth Hauptmann's translation from Arthur Waley's English version of the Japanese Nō drama Taniko).

Its companion piece is Der Neinsager (He Said No) although Brecht's other text was never set by Weill.

Weill also identifies the piece, following Brecht's development of the experimental form, as a Lehrstück, or "teaching-piece".

== Performance history ==
It was first performed in Berlin by students of the Akademie für Kirchen- und Schulmusik at the Zentralinstitut für Erziehung und Unterricht on 23 June 1930 and broadcast simultaneously on radio. It was successful and there were over 300 performances during the following three years.

Brecht subsequently revised the text twice, the final version, including Der Neinsager, being without music.

== Plot ==
A teacher leads a hike in the mountains, among the hikers being a young boy whose mother is quite ill. One variant of the story holds that the expedition is a quest for medicine, while another holds that it is in fact a religious pilgrimage. During the expedition the boy falls ill as well. He is asked whether he should be abandoned by his fellow hikers, for which the customary and expected response is yes. In Der Neinsager, the boy answers no and suggests instead that a different custom should be introduced, "'the custom that one must think afresh in every new situation"'.

== Roles ==
Role	Voice type	Premiere cast, 23 June 1930 (Conductor: Kurt Drabeck)
The boy	treble	
The mother	mezzo-soprano	
The teacher	baritone	Otto Hopf
First student	treble or tenor	
Second student	treble or tenor	
Third student	treble or baritone	

== Sources ==
- Casaglia, Gherardo (2005)."Der Jasager, 23 June 1930". L'Almanacco di Gherardo Casaglia (in Italian).
- Hinton, Stephen. 1992. "Jasager, Der". In The New Grove Dictionary of Opera. Ed. Stanley Sadie. London:. ISBN 0-333-73432-7.
- Weill, Kurt. 1930. Interview. In Collected Plays: Three by Bertolt Brecht. Ed. and trans. John Willett. Brecht Collected Plays Ser. London: Methuen, 1997. ISBN 978-0-413-70460-3. pp. 334–335
