= Downfall of the Egotist Johann Fatzer (American premiere) =

1926 play premiere

Shelter West Theatre Company, New York, 1978, showing the use of Brecht's "half-act curtain", projections of historic German locations.

The 1978 American premiere of Bertolt Brecht's 1926 play Downfall of the Egotist Johann Fatzer took place November 9, 1978, Off-Broadway at the Shelter West Theatre Company. It was directed by W. Stuart McDowell, then Artistic Director of the Riverside Shakespeare Company of New York, where McDowell subsequently staged the New York premiere of another of Brecht's early plays, Edward II. This production was inspired by the first German production of two years before, but in no way attempted to copy that production, but rather endeavored to develop a production style more appropriate to Brecht's theatre work of the 1920s.

Permission for the English translation and subsequent production was granted by Brecht's agent Bertha Case and Stefan Brecht on behalf of the Brecht estate.

== Use of music ==
The New York production of Fatzer starred Alexander Duncan as Fatzer, William Mesnik as Buesching, Kaeren Peregrin as Fanny, Peter Siiteri as Koch, and Trudi Mathes as Frau Kaumann, and featured a cabaret-style score composed by Tony Award-winning arranger and composer, Bruce Coughlin, played by a small jazz ensemble, and sung by leading chanteuse from Ireland and interpreter of Brecht's works, Agnes Bernelle. Miss Bernelle had earlier performed in several acclaimed productions of Brecht's work in Ireland and England, and had also recorded the popular record Bernelle on Brecht and..., produced by Philip Chevron of The Radiators and released in limited numbers by The Midnite Music Company in 1977.

Agnes Bernelle and Alexander Duncan, Shelter West Theatre Company, 1978.

The New York production also made extensive use of ballad-like songs woven into the production, as was common in many if not most of the productions of Brecht's plays in the 1920s, in particular Die Dreigroschenoper (The Threepenny Opera) which Brecht wrote with Kurt Weill during the period of the writing of Fatzer, 1926-1928. The songs in Fatzer made comment upon the action that had transpired or was to come, as a means of both entertaining the audience and drawing a deeper lesson out of the story.

== The staging ==
The production at the Shelter West Theatre Company incorporated several production techniques pioneered by Brecht as director, beginning with his signature "half-act curtain". This curtain was used in the production both as a projection surface, to receive titles of scenes and songs, as well as photographic images taken from historic sources from Germany of the time.

At times, while songs were being sung by Agnes Bernelle, the curtain was an opaque surface, like a white chalk board, and at other times, the curtain became transparent, revealing a scene from the play behind (see photos, right). The curtain was suspended on a simple set of wires, and parted in the middle to reveal each scene.

Featured in the cast were Alexander Duncan as Fatzer, Michael Detmold, Ellen Martin, Trudi Mathes, Jim Maxson, Jay Merrik, William Mesnik, Kaeren Peregrin, Linda Jo Rauth, Rick Richardson, Peter Siiteri, and other members of the Shelter West company.

Agnes Bernelle at Shelter West Theatre Company, 1978.
