= He Who Said No =

He Who Said No may refer to:

- Der Neinsager: A Plays by Bertolt Brecht.
- He Who Said No (film), a 2014 Iranian film
