= Mark Lammert =

German artist

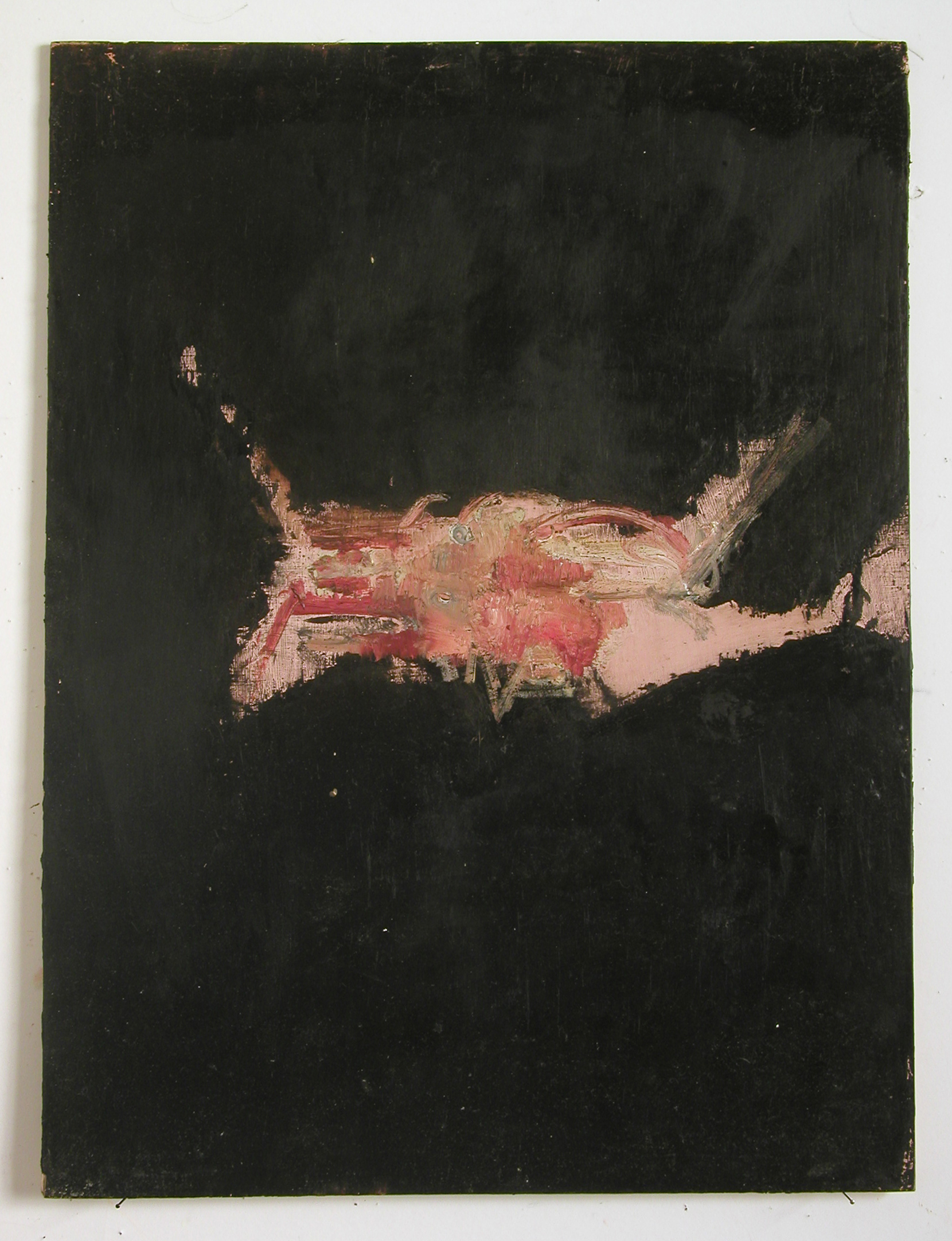
BLACK, 2004, oil on wood

Mark Lammert (born 30 September 1960 in Berlin), is a German painter, illustrator, graphic artist and stage designer. He lives and works in Berlin.

== Biography ==
Lammert studied painting at Kunsthochschule Berlin from 1979 to 1986 and from 1989 to 1992 he was master scholar at Akademie der Künste zu Berlin. In 1993 he created his first stage design for Heiner Müller’s production of „Duell-Traktor- Fatzer“ at Berliner Ensemble. In the following years he received scholarships for painting from Senatsverwaltung für Kulturelle Angelegenheiten, Berlin (1994) and the Kunstfond Bonn e.V. (1996) In 1997 he was affiliated to the latter as a curator. In 1997 he lived and worked in Lisbon and in 1998 he was awarded the Grafikpreis of Kunstmesse Dresden. In 1999 Akademie der Künste awarded him their Käthe Kollwitz Prize and in 2000/2001 Academie Experimentale des Theatres invited him to Paris. The Preußische Seehandlung presented him with their Eberhard Roters scholarship for painting in 2002. He spent most of 2002 in France, where he was artist in residence des „Les Recollets“, Paris. In 2011 Lammert was appointed professor of painting at the Universität der Künste, Berlin.

== Work ==
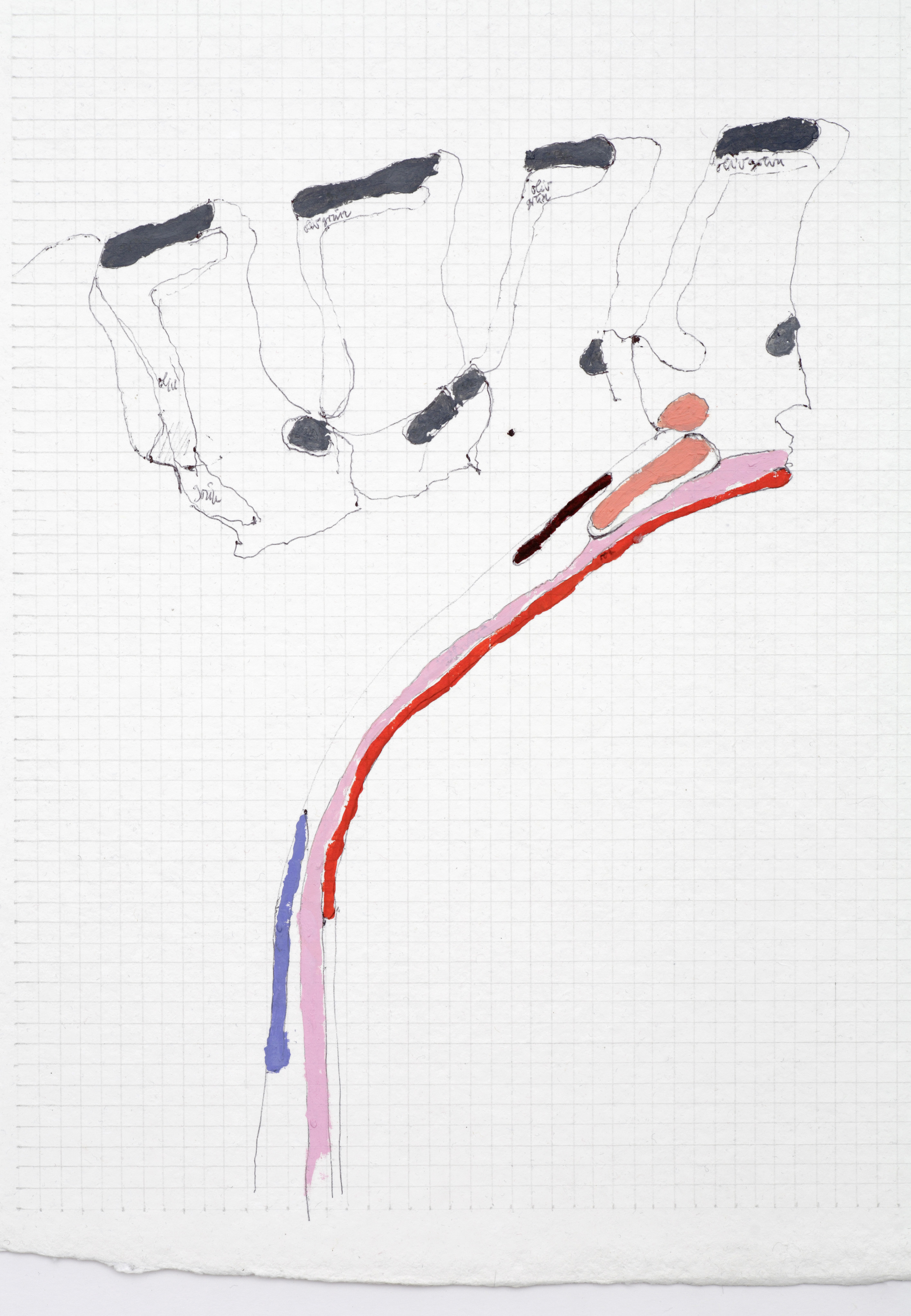
KNOCHEN, 2007, pen on paper

Lammert appeared before the public both with paintings and drawings from very early on and was represented in many exhibitions of German art (e.g. „Deutschlandbilder“, Bern 1997 and „Art of Two Germanys“, County Museum of Art, Los Angeles, 2009). His work is driven by a conceptual approach that questions the limits of what is pictorially representable. This applies to the early portraits (Stephan Hermlin, 1987) which were described as painted protest against a society unaware of its history and to the subsequent series of paintings, drawings and graphic art: beginning with the early group paintings „People Waiting“ (1983 – 88) via the frozen white nudes and butchery paintings up to the graphic sequence „Kinne“ that invalidates the cliche Heiner Müller.

His large-sized series of paintings „allied“ (1994–1995), he palimpsestically applied shades of red paint to the backside of maps increasingly illustrate his principle of reduction: he reduces fragments of human figures in the context of the cartographical pattern. He starts experimenting with various work bases, works on book caskets and puts fine line networks as quadrature onto drawings on crude paper. Since 1998 he has chosen to work on smaller pictures which he has expanded to tableaus. The scarceness that leaves only the elementary keeps the balance between the carnal and the skeleton, framework and matter, line and colour and also between image and polyvalent characters. The reduction not only captures the figurative traces of the physical, but also the colours of the backgrounds as the blots of paints appear on them like injuries. „Armbrusr“ (1997–1999), „Hüllen“ (1998–1999), „Brust-korb“ (1998–2000) and „Weiß“ (2001–2003) are placed onto white backgrounds, „Passion“ (2001–2002) and „Schwarz“ (2002–2004) are placed onto shaded dark backgrounds. Increasingly the colour sentiment begins to change („Floaters“, 2005–2009), whereas the relations between base and pictorial feature, as shown by the writing pieces, are changed and in their configuration turn towards the ornamental.

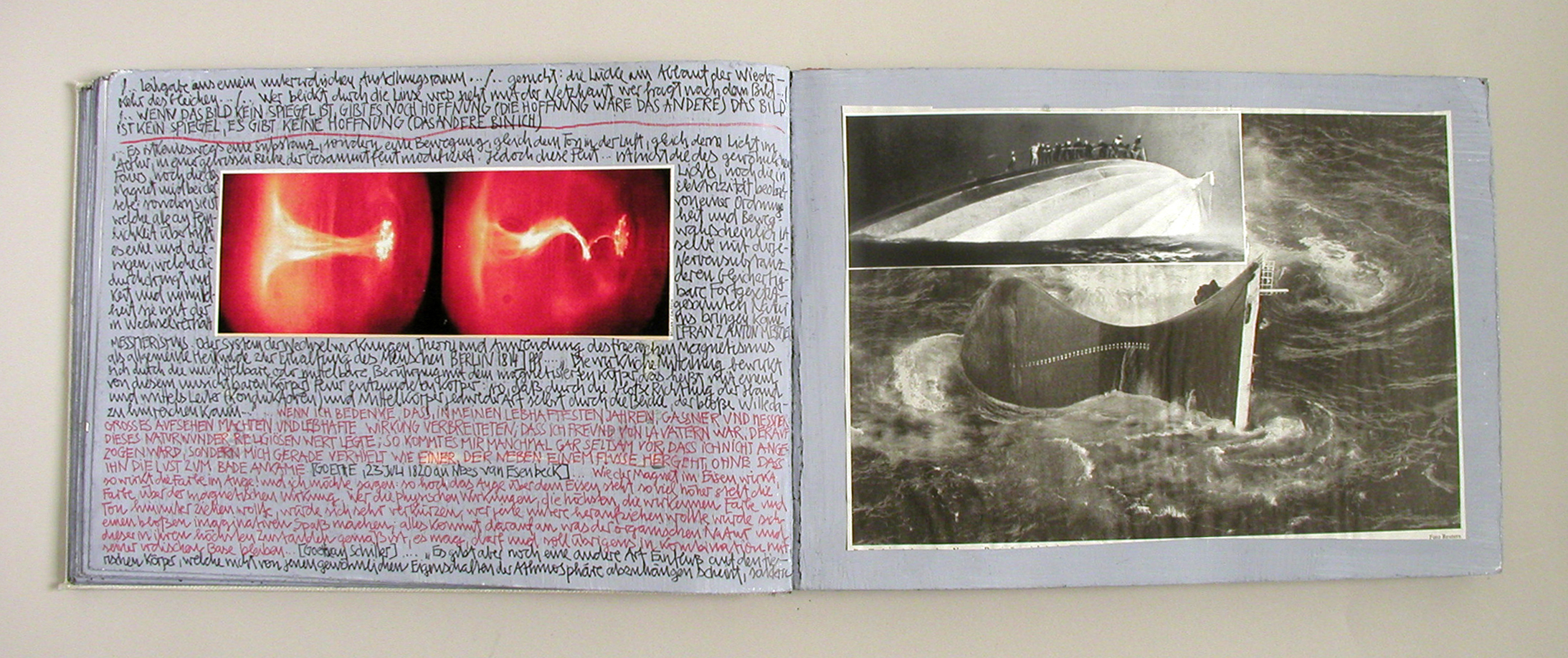
Page of a book, 2005

A comprehensive body of work consisting of print graphic pieces has been created alongside. In some cases all lithographic templates were embraced by the image-finding process to yield a collage-like result. Furthermore, since the 1980s, Lammert has been collecting his material in work books that serve as a parallel work space and by reflecting the media illustrate the political context his work emerges from. Apart from collages, photos and drawings which often disclose techniques of representing the brutal these books are filled with written notations and excerpts from various theoretical texts. The visual and the verbal are crossed. When creating the pieces entitled „Risse“ (2004), the technique of handwritten copying is used for the first time to bring into being pictures that are both text and drawing. By leaving openings within the body of text they reveal shapes and figures. Increasingly these notations become more fragmented and mapped. In „Knochen“ (2006/07) coloured, free-floating fields in linear contours that mark the growing stages from the animal collection of the Musée Fragonard in Paris in terms of colour are confronted with written extracts.

By means of his collaboration with Heiner Müller since 1991 („Aus dem Totenhaus“, 1990; „Blockade“, 1991; Totenzeichnungen 1995) Lammert created stage designs that convert the materiality of his painting into the spatial. The spaces that were sometimes merely divided by falling pieces of fabric (Germania 3, 1996) or by a revolving door (Perser, 2006) become fellow actors and have been referred to as dramaturgy engines.

== Work (selection) ==
=== Retrospectives ===
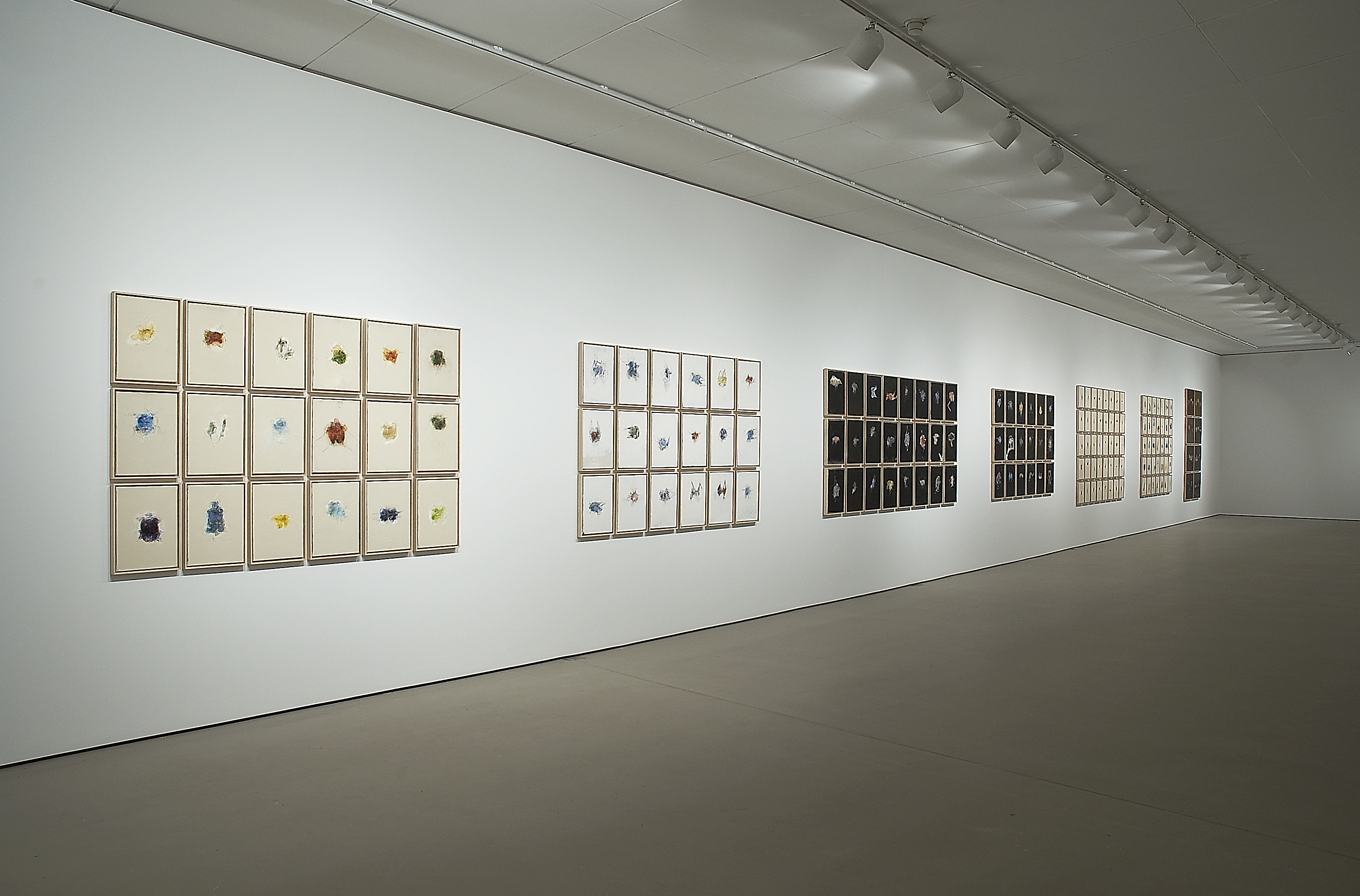
Exhibition Centro Arte Moderna, “Fragment d’espace”, Fundação Gulbenkian, Lisbon, 2005

- 1991 und 1993, Galerie Rotunde, Altes Museum, Staatliche Museen zu Berlin, Berlin (catalogue);
- 1995 Kunsthalle Rostock (catalogue);
- 1996 Kunstmuseum Kloster Unser Lieben Frauen, Magdeburg (catalogue);
- 1998 galerie refugium, Berlin;
- 1999 Käthe Kollwitz Preis, Akademie der Künste, Berlin (catalogue);
- 2000 Kunstkabinett am Goetheplatz, Stadtmuseum Weimar;
- 2001 „Arbeitsbücher und Serien“, Kunstsammlung Neubrandenburg;
- 2002 Kunstraum Les Subsistances, Lyon;
- 2004 „Risse“, fruehsorge - Galerie für Zeichnung, Berlin;
- 2005 “Fragment d’espace”, Centro de Arte Moderna, Fundação Calouste Gulbenkian, Lisbon (catalogue);
- 2006 “Ausgewählte Zeichnungen“, Berlinische Galerie, Landesmuseum für moderne Kunst, Fotografie und Architektur, Berlin (catalogue);
- 2007 „One Stepp beyond“ (mit Greg Stone), fruehsorge – Galerie für Zeichnung, Berlin;
- 2010 „beauty is booty", fruehsorge – Galerie für Zeichnung, Berlin;
- 2010 „Malerei 1997-2010", Guardini Gallerie, Berlin

=== Group exhibitions ===
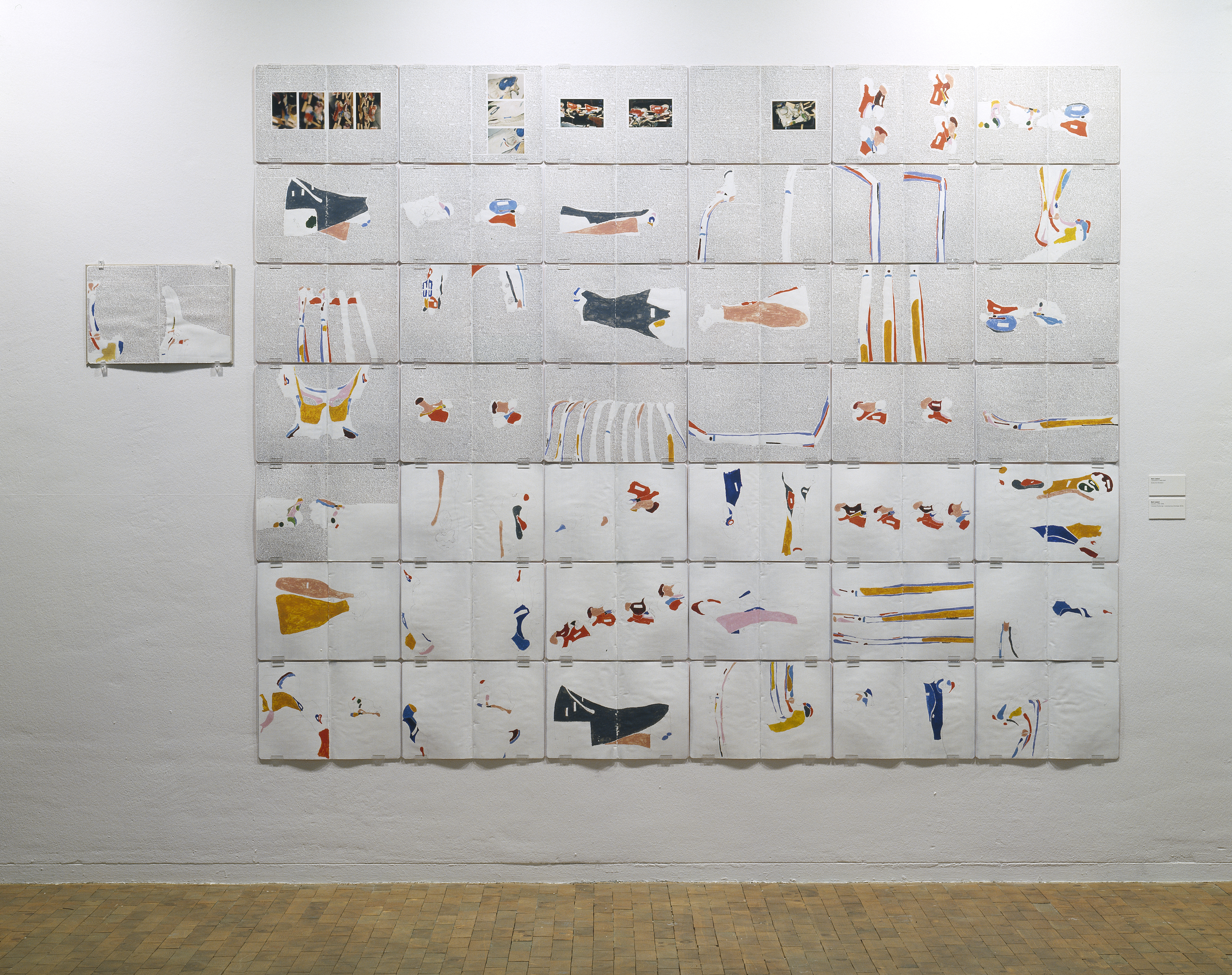
Exhibition Notation, Berlin/Karlsruhe, 2008/2009

- 1989 „1. Quadrinale – Zeichnungen der DDR“, Museum der bildenden Künste, Leipzig;
- 1991 „Vice Versa“, Frans Hals Museum, Haarlem;
- 1992 „Turning Points – East German Art in Revolution“, Northern Gallery for Contemporary Art, Sunderland u.a.;
- 1993 „Akademie 93“, Berlin;
- 1995 „Scharfer Blick – Der Deutsche Künstlerbund in Bonn“, Kunst- und Ausstellungshalle der Bundesrepublik Deutschland, Bonn;
- 1996 „Zeichnen“, Der Deutsche Künstlerbund, Germanisches Nationalmuseum, Nürnberg;
- 1996 „Das szenische Auge“, Institut für Auslandsbeziehungen, Berlin, Neu-Dehli u.a.;
- 1997 „respondem“, Exhibition Centre, Centro Cultural de Belém, Lisbon;
- 1997 „deutschlandbilder“, Martin-Gropius-Bau, Berlin;
- 2000 „Kabinett der Zeichnung“, Kunstverein Düsseldorf u.a.;
- 2002 „Wahnzimmer – Kunst und Kultur der achtziger Jahre in Deutschland“, Museum der bildenden Künste, Leipzig, and Museum Folkwang, Essen;
- 2003 „Warum!, Bilder diesseits und jenseits des Menschen“, Martin-Gropius-Bau, Berlin;
- 2003 „Kunst in der DDR“, Neue Nationalgalerie Berlin;
- 2008/2009 „Notation. Kalkül und Form in den Künsten“, Akademie der Künste, Berlin and ZKM, Karlsruhe;
- 2009 „Art of Two Germanys“, County Museum of Art, Los Angeles;
- 2009 „Zeigen", Temporäre Kunsthalle, Berlin;
- 2010 „Je mehr ich zeichne/Zeichnung als Weltentwurf", Museum für Gegenwartskunst, Siegen;
- 2012/2013 „Abschied von Ikarus", Neues Museum, Weimar;
- 2015 „Meisterspiel", Strawalde + Mark Lammert, GALERIE BORN, Berlin

=== Stage designs ===
- 1993 for Heiner Müller, „Duell-Traktor-Fatzer“ (Müller/Brecht), Berliner Ensemble, Berlin;
- 1995 for Heiner Müller, „Germania 3“ (Müller), Berliner Ensemble, Berlin;
- 1995 for Josef Szeiler, „Philoktet“ (Müller), Berliner Ensemble, Berlin;
- 1997 for Jean Jourdheuil, „Germania 3“ (Müller), Lisbon;
- 2003 for Jean Jourdheuil, „La Finta giardiniera“ (Mozart), Staatsoper Stuttgart;
- 2004 for Jean Jourdheuil, „Michel Foucault, chose dites, choses vues“, Festival d’Automne, Paris;
- 2005 for Jean Jourdheuil „Idemeneo“ (Mozart), Staatsoper Stuttgart;
- 2006 for Dimiter Gotscheff, „Die Perser“ (Aischylos/Müller), Deutsches Theater Berlin;
- 2007 for Dimiter Gotscheff, „Die Hamletmaschine“ (Müller), Deutsches Theater, Berlin;
- 2009 for Dimiter Gotscheff, „Die Perser“ (Aischylos), Epidauros/Greece;
- 2009 for Dimiter Gotscheff, „Prometheus“ (Aischylos/Müller), Volksbühne, Berlin;
- 2009 for Volker Schlöndorff, „Und das Licht scheint in der Finsternis“ (Tolstoi), Berlin/Moskau;
- 2009 for Jean Jourdheuil, „Philoktet“ (Sophokles/Müller), Théâtre de la Ville, Paris;
- 2009 for Dimiter Gotscheff, „Oedipus Tyrann“ (Sophokles/Hölderlin/Müller), Thalia Theater, Hamburg;
- 2010 for Dimiter Gotscheff, „Die Chinesin" (Godard), Volksbühne, Berlin;
- 2011 for Reinhild Hoffmann, „Exercices du silence", Staatsoper, Berlin;
- 2011 for Dimiter Gotscheff, „Medeamaterial" (Müller), Deutsches Theater, Berlin

=== Public collections ===
- Stiftung Preußischer Kulturbesitz, Kupferstichkabinett, Sammlung der Zeichnung, Berlin
- Berlinische Galerie, Landesmuseum für moderne Kunst, Fotografie und Architektur, Berlin
- Museum der Bildenden Künste, Leipzig
- Staatliches Lindenau Museum, Altenburg
- Staatliche Kunstsammlung, Dresden
- Staatliches Museum, Schwerin
- Sammlung Ann und Werner Kramarsky, New York
- Kunstsammlung der Akademie der Künste, Berlin
- Sammlung Deutsche Bank, Frankfurt a.M.

== Awards ==
- 1996 Wilhelm-Höpfner-Preis der Winckelmann-Gesellschaft, Stendal
- 1998 Grafik-Preis der Kunstmesse Dresden
- 1999 Käthe Kollwitz Preis der Akademie der Künste
- 2002 Eberhard Roters Stipendium der Preußischen Seehandlung, Berlin
- 2003 Artist in residence, Centre International „Les Recollets“, Paris

== Literature ==
- Michael Freitag: „Kalte Anschauung. Der Maler Mark Lammert“, in: Kunst in der DDR. Editors: Eckhardt Gillen/Rainer Haarmann, Köln, 1990.
- Heiner Müller: „Aus dem Totenhaus“, Edition Pariser Platz 4, Berlin, 1991.
- Jannis Kounellis, Mark Lammert und Heiner Müller: BLOCKADE/ICH HAB ZUR NACHT GESESSEN MIT GESPENSTERN, Berlin, 1993.
- Durs Grünbein: Müllers Kinn, Berlin, 1994.
- Anni Bradon: Schwebe-Zustand, Rostock, 1995.
- Heiner Müller und Mark Lammert: Drucksache Nr. 20, Berliner Ensemble, Arbeitsbuch zu „Germania 3/Gespenster am Toten Mann“, 1996.
- Uwe Gellner: „Körperräume“, in: Mark Lammert. Malerei, Berlin/Magdeburg, 1996.
- Antje von Graevenitz: „Rekonstruktion einer Szene“, in: IfA, Stuttgart, 1997.
- Jean Jourdheuil; Der Raum des Theaters und der Raum im Theater, Dresden/Berlin 1998.
- Matthias Flügge: „Laudatio für Mark Lammert“, in: Sinn und Form, Berlin, 1999.
- Michael Freitag: „Die Uneigentlichkeit des Scheins“, in: Warum, Ostfildern, 2003.
- Roland März: „Diptychon imaginiaire“, in: Humboldt, Heft 86, Bonn, 2003.
- Mirjam Schaub „Scriptoria“, in: SCHRIFT BILDER DENKEN, Walter Benjamin und die Künstler der Gegenwart, Frankfurt am Main, 2004.
- Knut Ebeling, Carolin Meister: Arbeitsbücher/Workbooks (engl.), Düsseldorf, Richter-Verlag, 2005.
- Jorge Molder: „Fragment d’espace“, in: CMA, Lisbon, 2005.
- Ulrike Haß: „Dramaturgiemaschinen. Zu den Bühnen Mark Lammerts“, in: Theater der Zeit, 2008.
- Amy Eshoo 560 Broadway. A New Drawing Collecktion at Work, 1991–2006, 2008.
- Reinhard Ermen: „Mark Lammert“, in: Kunstforum international, Bd. 196, Zeichnen zur Zeit, 2009.
- Eckhart Gillen: „Szenes from the theatre of the cold war of the arts“, in: Art of Two Germanys, County Museum of Art, Los Angeles, 2009.
- Matthias Flügge, Bruno Duarte: Mark Lammert, Malerei 1997–2010 (engl.), Richter Verlag, Düsseldorf, 2011.
- Juriaan Benschop: Mark Lammert, in: Artforum, New York March 2011.
- Judith Elisabeth Weiss: Mark Lammerts Kinne und Haare. Zeichnerische Fragmente von Heiner Müller und Dimiter Gotscheff, in: Kunstforum international, Bd. 216, 2012.
