= Stranger at My Door (1950 film) =

1950 British film by Brendan J. Stafford

- Theatrical release poster
- Directed by: Brendan J. Stafford
- Screenplay by: Desmond Leslie
- Produced by: Paul King
- Starring: Valentine Dyall; Joseph O'Conor; Agnes Bernelle
- Cinematography: Brendan J. Stafford
- Edited by: Ann Barker
- Music by: Leslie Bridgewater
- Production company: Leinster Films
- Release date: 1950
- Running time: 84 minutes
- Country: United Kingdom
- Language: English

Stranger at My Door (also known as At a Dublin Inn) is a 1950 second feature ('B') British film directed by Brendan J. Stafford and starring Valentine Dyall, Joseph O'Conor and Agnes Bernelle. It was written by Desmond Leslie.

== Plot ==
The story is narrated in flashback. Michael Foley is a young Irish ex-soldier whose girlfriend Laura is the victim of suave English blackmailer Paul Wheeler. Foley unwillingly resorts to crime to obtain money to pay off Wheeler.

== Cast ==
- Valentine Dyall as Paul Wheeler
- Joseph O'Conor as Michael Foley
- Agnes Bernelle as Laura Riorden
- Maire O'Neill as Clarissa Finnegan
- Liam O'Leary as Kelly
- Jill Raymond as Kate
- Harry Hutchinson as Sean the publican
- Michael Moore as Septimus Small
- W. E. Holloway as the canon
- Michael Seavers as altar boy
- Alan Gore-Lewis as Detective Duffy
- Charles Mansell as Inspector O'Brien
- Dorothy Dewhurst as Laura's landlady
- Madelene Burgess as Rita
- Bea Duffell as Proctor Finnigan
- Jimmy Page as Guarda O'Toole
- Charles Vance as Guarda Hanlon
- Malachy Keegan as Guarda Heggetty
- Katherine Mora as the fence
- Nigel Neilsen as ballad singer

== Reception ==
The Monthly Film Bulletin wrote: "Confused but quite well handled thriller. ... Pleasant use of Dublin locations, and a good performance from Joseph O'Connor [sic] as the hero."

Kine Weekly wrote: "Romantic crime melodrama, with a strong Irish flavour. ... Although direction is a trifle uneven, authentic Dublin backgrounds and an exciting rooftop chase climax cancel out most of its shortcomings. ...The picture goes out of its way to get a new slant on 'crime does not pay' and even if it is a little pretentious in places and forced in its comedy, it has convincing atmosphere."

Picture Show called the film an "exciting, if drawn-out, crime melodrama, ... told with humour and reality."

Chibnall and McFarlane, in The British 'B' Film, describe the film as "hardboiled melodrama".
