= Agnes Bernelle =

German actress (1923–1999)

- Born: 7 March 1923
- Died: 15 February 1999 (aged 75)
- Occupations: actress and singer
- Known for: "black propaganda" radio announcer

Agnes Bernelle (born Agnes Elisabeth Bernauer; 7 March 1923 – 15 February 1999) was a Berlin-born actress and singer, who lived in England for many years, then Ireland. She appeared in over 20 films and also made stage and television appearances.

Her family fled Berlin in 1936. She was the wartime "black propaganda" radio announcer codenamed "Vicky" for the British Political Warfare Executive.

== Biography ==
During the Second World War, she became involved with top secret British Special Operations radio broadcasts. Transmitting from Woburn Abbey alongside the top secret Enigma project, she was introduced to black propaganda. She was recruited for her native German language skills and was suggested by her father, Rudolf Bernauer, after he was sought out for his theatrical and German connections, operating under the codename "Vicky".

Her radio broadcasts on Deutscher Kurzwellensender Atlantik were bounced over to Germany and primarily were aimed at spreading confusion and lowering morale among German forces, along with being littered with code messages for resistance fighters on the continent disguised as record labels and numbers.

An oft-repeated story is that a broadcast by Bernelle caused a U-boat captain to surrender by informing him that his wife – whom he had not seen for two years – had given birth to twins.

Bernelle was Catholic. She converted to Catholicism in the mid-1930s along with her father, Bernauer, who was Hungarian and Jewish. Her German mother, Emmy (née Erb), was Protestant.

== Family life ==
Bernelle was married from 1945 to 1969 to Desmond Leslie. Leslie briefly became notorious for assaulting Bernard Levin during a live transmission of That Was the Week That Was in 1962 for writing a hostile review of one of his wife's performances. The show was An Evening of Savagery and Delight which had rave reviews at the Dublin Festival but lasted only three weeks at London's Duchess Theatre and polarised audiences. Bernelle bravely posted all the bad reviews along with the good outside the theatre.

The couple had three children.

== Later years ==
As an international cabaret singer she collaborated on record with artists such as Marc Almond, Elvis Costello, Tom Waits, and The Radiators. She released three albums. The first, Bernelle on Brecht and... was produced by Philip Chevron of The Radiators and released in limited numbers by the Midnite Music Company in 1977. In 1985, she released Father's Lying Dead on the Ironing Board, again produced by Chevron. This was followed in 1988 by Some Bizzare label produced album, Mother, The Wardrobe is full of Infantrymen. The first two albums are filled with songs from Weimar cabaret (her father Rudolf Bernauer owned and ran three cabaret theatres in Berlin during the Weimar Republic years) and the third has more modern updates on the form with songs from Tom Waits and Roger McGough. She also sang a duet with Marc Almond on his The Stars We Are album, a song called Kept Boy.

In 1978, Bernelle appeared Off Broadway in New York City in the American premiere of Bertolt Brecht's Downfall of the Egotist Johann Fatzer, with Shelter West Theater Company at the Vam Dam Theatre, directed by W. Stuart McDowell, with an original musical score of ballads sung by Bernelle, composed by Tony Award-winning composer/arranger, Bruce Coughlin.

== Last years ==
She spent the later years of her life with her second partner, the historian and author Maurice Craig, in Sandymount, County Dublin. The Fun Palace, her autobiography, was published in 1995.

== Selected filmography ==
- Caesar and Cleopatra (1945), lady in waiting (uncredited)
- Woman to Woman (1947)
- But Not in Vain (1948), Mary Meyer
- The Missing Princess (1949), The Baroness
- Stranger at My Door (1950), Laura Riordan
- Over the Garden Wall (1950)
- The Quare Fellow (1962), Meg
- The First Great Train Robbery (1979), woman on platform
- The Irish R.M. (1985), Mrs. Maguire (1 episode, 1985)
- Die Wächter (1986, TV miniseries), Mrs. Talbot
- The Fantasist (1986), Mrs. O'Malley
- Agnes Bernelle: I Was the Little Girl (documentary, by RTÉ 1989), self
- Hear My Song (1991), receptionist
- An Awfully Big Adventure (1995), Mrs. Ackerly
- The Tale of Sweety Barrett (1998), Mrs. Walsh
- Still Life (short, 1999), old woman
- The Collaborators (2008) Short documentary, self (Archive footage)

== Discography ==
- The Lost Noises Office (1961) 7-inch EP (Narrator)
- Lullabies for Sleepy Lovers (year unknown) 7-inch EP
- Bernelle on Brecht And... (1977)
- "Kitty Ricketts" c/w "Things" (1979) 7-inch single with the Radiators
- Father's Lying Dead on the Ironing Board (1985)
- Kept Boy (1989) duet with Marc Almond.
- Mother the Wardrobe Is Full of Infantrymen (1990)
