= Inge Müller =

East German author and poet

Inge Müller (born Inge Meyer) (13 March 1925 – 1 June 1966) was an East German author and the second wife of East German playwright Heiner Müller.

== Life ==
Inge Müller was born in Berlin in 1925. During World War II, she participated in the Reichsarbeitsdienst in different towns in Styria until she would be sent to Berlin as a Luftwaffe aide. Her parents died in an air strike. They lay buried together under rubble for three days with a dog. This was a traumatic experience which would accompany Inge for the rest of her life.

In the post war era, she was a secretary, Trümmerfrau, a worker, a journalist and a correspondent. Her first marriage to Kurt Loose lasted only a short time but produced a son. Already by 1948, she married Herbert Schwenker who was the leader of the variety theatre Friedrichstadtpalast and later the Circus Busch. She became a member of the SED and lived in Lehnitz, a district of the town of Oranienburg, from 1954 until 1959 where she enjoyed a privileged and unburdened existence.

In autumn of 1953, she became acquainted with Heiner Müller at a function of the Young Authors Working Group (Arbeitsgemeinschaft Junger Autoren). She soon afterwards moved into a shared apartment with him and they were married in 1955. The pair, who now earned their money as freelance writers, worked together on radio drama and theater pieces.

However, Inge Müller's dream of working together with Heiner as equals soon began to fade. She stood in the shadow of Heiner, who considered her more a coworker rather than as an equal partner. She began an affair with Heiner's 16-year-old brother Wolfgang Müller in 1956 which failed and relations with her husband worsened noticeably. The awarding of the Heinrich Mann Prize to the both of them in 1959 did nothing to improve the situation. In addition, the expulsion of Heiner from the authors union of the GDR (Schriftstellerverband der DDR) compounded these problems. Plagued by depressions and psychosomatic troubles she attempted suicide several times. She ultimately died by suicide on 1 June 1966. Only 41 years old, the writer died in her apartment on Kissingenplatz 12 of medication overdose and poisonous gas. The Aufbau Verlag made a futile endeavour to publish a volume with her poetry shortly after her death. Her works quickly passed into oblivion because a suicide did not fit in the literary picture of East German politics and, also, Heiner reclaimed the sole authorship of the collaboration. The first posthumous publication of her works was carried out by Bernd Jentzsch in 1976 in his first series Poesiealbum, first appeared in 1985, 20 years after her death, a book, which made accessible Inge Müller's literary work of broad public nature, with Richard Pietraß' Wenn ich schon sterben muß.

Her final resting place is in Friedhof Pankow III, a cemetery in Berlin.

== Works ==
In her lifetime, Inge Müller published only a little among them the children's books Wölfchen Ungestüm (1955) and Zehn Jungen und ein Fischerdorf (1958), the emancipating and time relevant radio drama Die Weiberbrigade and the collaboration with Wiktor Rosows Auf dem Wege. Many stayed only fragments like the novel Ich Jona. With Heiner Müller, she created the dramas Der Lohndrücker (1956), Die Umsiedlerin (1956), Die Korrektur (1957), Klettwitzer Bericht (1958) and Unterwegs (1963).

She had remained above all a poet. Although nearly 300 lyrical works were created in her lifetime, only a few were published, mostly in the anthology In diesem besseren Land.

== Literature ==
Biographies:

- Ines Geipel: Dann fiel auf einmal der Himmel um. Henschel Verlag 2002, ISBN 3894874171
- Review of 'Dann fiel...' http://www.zeit.de/2005/37/L-Inge_M_9fller in German
- Sonja Hilzinger: Das Leben fängt heute an. Aufbau Verlag Berlin 2005, ISBN 3351025858

Works published:

- Richard Pietraß (Editor): Wenn ich schon sterben muß. Aufbau Verlag Berlin 1985, ISBN 3351004494
- Sonja Hilzinger (Editor): Daß ich nicht ersticke am Leisesein. Aufbau Verlag Berlin 2002, ISBN 3351029373
