= Downfall of the Egotist Johann Fatzer =

Downfall of the Egotist Johann Fatzer (German: Der Untergang des Egoisten Johann Fatzer) is an unfinished play by Bertolt Brecht, written between 1926 and 1930. Translated as Downfall of the Egotist Johann Fatzer or Demise of the Egotist Johann Fatzer, the play is often called the Fatzer Fragment, or simply Fatzer.

== Plot and importance ==
The plot, as far as it is consistent, centers around a group of soldiers who desert from the First World War and hide out in the German city Mülheim, waiting for a revolution; among them Johann Fatzer. Other figures vary. Conflicts arise between the individualistic behavior Fatzer's and the group, first of all Keuner, representing an approach of (party) discipline, but none-the-less they seem to depend on Fatzer to see them through. Either way, they end up dead.

"KOCH
The battle hasn’t
Killed us, but
At calm air in the quiet room
We kill ourselves."

Like other plays produced in the context of the Lehrstücke the Fatzer text is written in verse and contains passages for a commenting chorus. Many of the more elaborated fragments are speeches Fatzer's or chorus segments.

"FATZER
All people at once own the air and the road
Free to roam in the stream of consorting
To hear human voices, see faces
I must be allowed to.
Is my live but short and soon over and amongst the walking
I will no longer be seen. Even in fight I have to breathe
Eat and drink as always. It may last forever
That is longer than me, and then I have, slain,
Not lived at all. The chest, too, withers
In the hideouts and to what purpose conceal
A degenerate man. All that is proof, that I can go
As I like and where I want to."

Due to the inaccessibility of the text (until the early 1990s only few sections were published) and the fragmentary nature of it the Fatzer text isn't as widely known as most of Brecht's other plays. However, Brecht himself considered the Fatzer fragment as his highest standard technically and considered re-using the Fatzer Verse in a project as late as 1951. It was considered as being Brecht's equivalent to Goethe’s Faust, that is a material which Brecht kept himself open, throughout his life, for experiment.

== Fatzer Document and Fatzer commentary ==
The overall fragment includes, besides the dramatic text (the "fatzerdocument"), instructive sections which Brecht calls the "fatzerkommentar" (Fatzer Commentary).

Notable statements from the commentary regard the necessity of playing the document before interpreting it, the advice to always approach it taking into account to the most up-to-date practices and understanding of the arts at the time and the suggestion to "throw the whole play apart" for experimental "Selbstverständigung". The term "Selbstverständigung" can be translated both as acquiring understanding of oneself as an individual as well as elaborating common understanding within a group.

Brecht also reflects that he writes the Fatzer Document first of all as a form of examination for himself. He considers that he doesn't have to finish it as it is this method of examination which can become the focus for recipients’ own examinations. Literally: "The intention for which a work is produced is not identical with the way it is used."

Brecht not only displays a significant shift with the Fatzer text from producing texts/drama as something to be put before an audience to using it as a means for the elaboration of meaning for himself: in the light of acquiring the concepts of materialistic dialectic for himself, he goes a step further in (rudimentary) laying this out as a general approach to theatrical elaboration as an ongoing process, emancipated from the delivery of productions, veering towards a concept of theatre characterized by participation rather than consumption.

== Context and interpretation ==
The Fatzer text, in particular the Fatzer Commentary was considered by Reiner Steinweg as contributions to Brecht's conception of the Lehrstücke as a form of pedagogical theatre intended for practicing participants rather than being staged by actors for an audience. Reiner Steinweg was responsible for re-discovering and piecing together Brecht's Lehrstück theory, which he managed, in the 1970s, to get recognized as Brecht's most radical and advanced aesthetical work, abandoned less due to formal maturation Brecht's but as response to external political circumstances: the fight against Fascism, exile, then Brecht's support in establishing the newly formed GDR.

Heiner Müller, who played a central role in recognizing the Fatzer text as a major drama of the 20th century, interpreted this latest effort as a deliberate lowering of standards in an attempt to "clear out the bodies form the cellars, while the houses are built on the same foundations", identified as a crucial dilemma of GDR cultural politics. He holds against this the aesthetic quality and experimental possibilities of the Fatzer text, which, in its unresolvedness is closer to Kafka's way of writing under the "pressure of experience".

The loose nature of the 500 pages of the Fatzer Fragment stand in stark contrast to the very concise form of the completed Lehrstücke. The central theme of the confrontation of the individualistic urges of a strong (male) individual (Fatzer) versus the solidarity to a group is described by Müller as Brecht's immense effort to consolidate the stance of his early plays with the new Marxist approach to the Lehrstücke, as "attrition warfare Brecht against Brecht (=Nietzsche against Marx, Marx against Nietzsche)".

== Publication ==
Brecht himself published a 13-page fragment called "Fatzer, 3" in the first issue of the Versuche in 1930. The publication of "Der Untergang des Egoisten Johann Fatzer" is announced for an upcoming issue of the Versuche but never happened.

Reiner Steinweg published pieces regarding the Lehrstück theory in 1976. Also the program to the premiere of the play at the Schaubühne am Halleschen Ufer from the same year contains selected fragments of the text.

The first German publication of the text as an overall play in book form appeared in 1994 as a stage version produced by Heiner Müller for the production of the Deutsche Schauspielhaus in Hamburg in 1978.

== Theatrical performances ==
Despite its late publication, there have been several theatrical adaptations of the text starting from 1976. Aesthetically they range from rather traditional stage productions in the style of the Epic Theatre to approaches which reflect Brecht's experimental theories in-depth both for publicly accessible productions and university research projects examining possibilities of integrating theatrical praxis and theory as suggested by Brecht's approach to the Fatzer text.

=== Chronology of selected performances ===
- Der Untergang des Egoisten Johnann Fatzer, Schaubühne am Halleschen Ufer, (West) Berlin, 1976. Director: Frank Patrick Steckel
- Downfall of the Egotist Johann Fatzer, Shelter West Theatre Company, New York, 1978. Director: W. Stuart McDowell
- Der Untergang des Egoisten Johnann Fatzer, Deutsches Schauspielhaus, Hamburg 1978. Directors: Wolfgang Karge / Matthias Langhoff
- FatzerMaterial, TheaterAngeluNovus, Vienna 1985
- FatzerMaterial. Vom Theater ist daher zu sagen, was man vom Körper sagt. University of Vienna 1988/89. Direction: Josef Szeiler / Monika Meister
- Duell Traktor Fatzer, Berliner Ensemble, Berlin 1993–1996. Director: Heiner Müller (Based upon Müller's Volokolomsk Highway III, The Duel (Wolokolamsker Chaussee III, Das Duell), Mommsens Block, and Tractor (Traktor), as well as Heiner Müller's compilation of Brecht's Fatzer fragment)
- massakermykene. bertolt brecht «fatzer-fragment» /aischylos «agamemnon» (oresteia). theatercombinat wien, Abbatoire St. Marx, Vienna 1/1999 - 12/2000
- Traces of: Fatzer. International youth project on occasion of the anniversary of the town Mülheim. Mülheim an der Ruhr, 2008-2010
- brecht: fragments, Raven Row, London 15 June - 18 August 2024. Director: Phoebe von Held. One of four of Brecht’s dramatic fragments from the 1920s performed twice-daily in the gallery during their exhibition, which addressed the collagist methods of Brecht.

== Editions ==
- Bertolt Brecht: Der Untergang des Egoisten Johann Fatzer. Bühnenfassung von Heiner Müller. Frankfurt am Main, Suhrkamp, 1994. (edition suhrkamp 1830). ISBN 978-3-518-11830-6
- Bertolt Brecht: The Demise of the Egotist Johann Fatzer. Translated by Stefan Brun, 1992. (Based on a German stage version of the Berliner Ensemble and the English Language Premiere at Prop Thtr in Chicago)
- Bertolt Brecht: Versuche 1–3. 1930.

== Bibliography ==
- Heiner Müller: fatzer +- keuner. In: Heiner Müller: Rotwelsch. Berlin 1982.
- Reiner Steinweg: Brechts Modell der Lehrstücke. Zeugnisse, Diskussionen, Erfahrungen. Frankfurt am Main, Suhrkamp, 1976.
- Josef Szeiler (ed): FatzerMaterial. Vienna, Cologne, Böhlau 1990 (= Maske und Kothurn, 34.1-4, 1988).
- Judith Wilke: The Making of a Document: An Approach to Brecht's Fatzer Fragment. In: The Drama Review, 43.4 (1999).
- Judith Wilke: Brechts Fatzer-Fragment: Lektüren zum Verhältnis von Dokument und Kommentar. 1998.
- Squiers, Anthony. An Introduction to the Social and Political Philosophy of Bertolt Brecht: Revolution and Aesthetics. Amsterdam: Rodopi. 2014. ISBN 9789042038998
