= Quartet (Müller play) =

Quartet, sometimes written as Quartett, is a 1980 play written by the (formerly East) German playwright Heiner Müller.

Its subject matter rendered it unlikely for production under the GDR's repressive cultural policies, but Müller's status as the nation's most eminent playwright after the death of Bertolt Brecht allowed him great leeway for travel, and so when the progressive director of the prestigious Schauspielhaus Bochum offered him and his director B. K. Tragelehn the chance to premier the work there, the GDR's cultural czars offered no objection. The casting was stellar: despite the profusion of eminent actors in the Bochum company, one of the leading actresses of the even more eminent Berliner Schaubühne Libgart Schwarz was asked to play "Merteuil" to the "Valmont" of the peripatetic Fassbinder collaborator Fritz Schediwy.

The play is in Müller's highly laconic late style: there are no stage directions; punctuation is sparse, giving the text a bald, telegraphic affect despite the elaborate rhetoric of the often long speeches. No setting or time period are mentioned in the text, although the Bochum program book does offer the rubric "Time/place: salon before the French Revolution/bunker after the III World War". The undescribed "action" of the play compresses the main plot turns of Choderlos de Laclos's 1782 epistolary novel Les liaisons dangereuses into a little more than an hour of "theater games" in which the two performers take turns playing Laclos's characters of weary rouė, scheming adulteress, virtuous wife, and innocent virgin (Although the roles are usually played by man and woman, other productions have chosen to cast same-sex couples). or even an operatic version for single performer.

Despite its challenges to performers (and audiences), the play's strange balance between austerity and flamboyance has rendered it much the most performed of Müller's plays. The almost unlimited interpretive freedom offered by the text has made the work a favorite of adventurous and radical directors (among them Michael Haneke and Robert Wilson) while the virtuosity of the roles, combined with the lurid language and vivid imagery, has made the piece a party piece for star performers, particularly in one-shot festival settings.

In 2011, the play was made into an opera, Quartett, by Italian composer Luca Francesconi. Francesconi adapted the libretto faithfully from Müller's text, however, the opera is in English.

== Themes ==
The impact of any one production of the play varies considerably with the interpretive choices of the artists involved in it. It can safely be said that any serious staging will heavily emphasize one of the author's abiding concerns: the inherent cruelty of human existence, the way all relationships ultimately come down to struggles for possession and defeat of "the other." The play has also provided the mulch for a florid garden of critical, psychological, and philosophical disquisition.

== Performance ==
- 1982 Schauspielhaus Bochum, premiered on 7 April, director BK Tragelehn (with Libgart Schwarz and Fritz Schediwy)
- 1983 Vienna Schauspielhaus, Austrian premiere on 5 February, Staging: Hans Gratzer (with Erni Mangold and Joachim Unmack )
- 1983 New City Theatre, Seattle, Washington USA, English-language premiere, 8 September. Translator: Roger Downey, Staging: Carlo Scandiuzzi (with Lori Larsen and Rex McDowell)
- 1983 Ensemble Théâtral Mobile, Brussel, French-language premiere, 6 december. Translators: Jean Jourdheuil, Béatrice Perregaux, Stage director : Marc Liebens (with Dominique Boissel and Francine Landrain, actors)
- 1985 Schauspielhaus Cologne, Director: Dimiter Gotscheff
- 1987 Schlosstheater Ludwigsburg, Staging Robert Wilson
- 1987 Theater am Turm Frankfurt, Director: Michael Haneke (with Elke Lang and Rüdiger Hacker )
- 1992 Fremont Palace, Seattle, Washington, director Roger Downey (with Leslie Law and Christopher Evan Welch)
- 1993 Primitive Science London, staging Marc Henning
- 1994 Berliner Ensemble, Director: Heiner Müller (with Marianne Hoppe and Martin Wuttke )
- 1994 Theater cooperation Solingen, Man in the Moon Theatre London, Staging: Andreas Schäfer (with Claudia Gahrke and Gerlinde Valtin )
- 1994 Center Theater Ensemble, Chicago, Illinois, Director: Dan LeMorte
- 1995 Free Theatre Bozen, staging Reinhard Auer (with Gabriele Long and Thomas Radleff )
- 1999 Theater in the Square Hall, Staging: Christoph Meier beer (with Anke Tornow and Sigurd Bemme)
- 2006 Schauspielhaus Wien (co-production with Toneelhuis Antwerp), Director: Peter Misotten
- 2007 Salzburg Festival, staging Barbara Frey, with Barbara Sukowa and Jeroen Willems
- 2009 Staatsoper Stuttgart, Director: Thomas Bischoff, Music: FM unit
- 2010 Hamburger Sprechwerk, Premiere 24 February 2010, Director: Erik Fiebiger, With: Julia Dilg & Wolfgang Hartmann
- 2010 Berne City Theatre, director: Erich Sidler (with Heidi Maria Glössner, Andri Schenardi, Mike Svoboda (trombone), Philip Zoubek ( prepared piano ), Philipp Ludwig Stangl (video, composition & live electronics ))
- 2011 theater laboratory Bremen, Premiere 5 June 2011, Director: Andreas Menzel (with Kathrin Steinweg, Alexander Abramyan and Anna Ewald (flute))
- 2013 German National Theatre, Premiere 22 October 2013, directed by Enrico Stolzenburg (with Elke Wieditz and Bernd Lange)
- 2013 Anhalt Theatre Dessau, Premiere 7 December 2013, Director: Axel Sichrovsky (with Natalie Hünig and Sebastian Müller-Stahl)
- 2014 Theater in der Josefstadt, Premiere 6 February 2014, directed by Hans Neuenfels (with Elisabeth Trissenaar and Helmuth Lohner)
- 2016 Célestins Lyon, Première 6 January 2016 Director: Michel Raskine (with Marief Guittier et Thomas Perregaux)
- 2016 Wuppertal Opera, Premiere 4 February 2016, directed by Uwe Dreysel (Solo for Uwe Dreysel)
- 2018 Trafó Budapest, directed by Anna Lengyel (with Anna Gulyás and Mark Lakatos)
- 2024 Theater U34, directed by Henry Toma (with Mo Sauer and Mike Sperber)
