= Postdramatic theatre =

German avant-garde theater

The notion of postdramatic theatre was established by German theatre researcher Hans-Thies Lehmann in his book Postdramatic Theatre, summarising a number of tendencies and stylistic traits occurring in avant-garde theatre since the end of the 1960s. The theatre which Lehmann calls postdramatic is not primarily focused on the drama in itself, but evolves a performative aesthetic in which the text of the performance is put in a special relation to the material situation of the performance and the stage. The postdramatic theatre attempts to mimic the unassembled and unorganized literature that a playwright sketches in the novel.

Postdramatic theatre, thus, strives to produce an effect amongst the spectators rather than to remain true to the text. Lehmann locates what he calls 'the new theatre' as part of 'a simultaneous and multi-perspectival form of perceiving'; this, he argues is brought about, in large part, by a reaction to the dominance of the written text.

The new theatre, Lehmann asserts, is characterised by, amongst other things, the 'use and combination of heterogeneous styles', it situates itself as after or beyond dialogue and incorporates the notion of the 'performer as theme and protagonist'.

In its most radical varieties, postdramatic theatre knows no "plot" at all, but concentrates fully on the interaction between performer and audience.

Another way of using the notion is to describe plays with little or no drama, for instance the plays of Jon Fosse and With the People from the Bridge by Dimitris Lyacos.

Some names associated with postdramatic theatre are Tadeusz Kantor (Kraków), Heiner Müller (Berlin), René Pollesch (Berlin), Robert Wilson (New York City), The Wooster Group (New York City), The Builders Association (New York City), Giannina Braschi (San Juan, Puerto Rico), Elizabeth LeCompte (New York City), Richard Foreman (New York City), Robert Lepage (Quebec, Canada), Pina Bausch (Wuppertal, Germany), Big Art Group (New York City), Jan Fabre, Jan Lauwers and Needcompany, Frank Castorf (Berlin), Josef Szeiler/TheaterAngelusNovus (Vienna), Elfriede Jelinek (Vienna), Heiner Goebbels (Frankfurt), Verdensteatret (Oslo), Alvis Hermanis (Riga), Forced Entertainment (Sheffield), Teater Moment (Stockholm), the Apocryphal Theatre (London), The Sydney Front (Australia) and Socìetas Raffaello Sanzio (Italy), Pan Pan (Ireland), POST (Australia), Action Hero (United Kingdom), Nature Theatre of Oklahoma (United States), Scum! Theatre (United Kingdom) and more.

Contemporary postdramatic theatre directors working internationally include Thomas Luz, Amir Reza Koohestani, Susanne Kennedy, Dusan David Parizek, Yael Ronen, Simon Stone, Kai Tuchmann, Anna Bergmann, Bastian Kraft, Ulrich Rasche, Nicolas Stemann, and Kay Voges.

== Controversy ==
While the concept of the "postdramatic theatre" has become popular in theatre studies, the term is highly contested and is not without its critics. Most notably, the celebrated scholar Elinor Fuchs criticized Lehmann's overly broad application of the term in her review in TDR in 2008, noting that "With a single term, Lehmann re-creates three or more generations of theatrical outliers as a movement. Virtually every contemporary theatre artist and group of international note is here identified as a practitioner of the postdramatic." Fuchs goes on to point out that Lehmann attempts to show the range of the postdramatic "by showing that it can contain all moods and modes, hieratic and profane, hermetic and popular, abstract and concretely physical. In the semiotic terms favored by the German critical tradition, Lehmann levels the traditional hierarchy of theatrical signs and at the same time multiplies sign systems."

Several scholars, including Fuchs, have also noted that the concept of the postdramatic is not Lehmann's original idea, and that, in fact, the concept was first introduced by Andrzej Wirth of the Institut fur Angewandte Theaterwissenschaft and Richard Schechner, director of The Performance Group, and professor of Performance Studies at New York University.
