= Der Neinsager =

Der Neinsager (He Said No) – like its companion piece Der Jasager (He Said Yes) – is a 1930 Lehrstück by the German dramatist Bertolt Brecht. However, unlike Der Jasager, it was never made into an opera.
