= Heiner Müller =

German writer, poet, and theatre director (1929–1995)

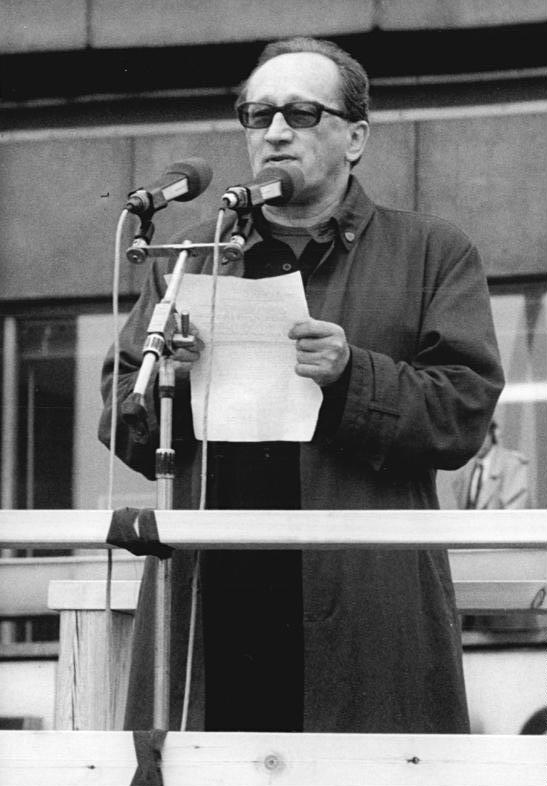
- Heiner Müller speaking at the Alexanderplatz demonstration in East Berlin (4 November 1989).
- Born: 9 January 1929; Eppendorf, Saxony, Weimar Germany
- Died: 30 December 1995 (aged 66); Berlin, Germany
- Occupations: Dramatist; Theatre director Dramaturg; Poet; Essayist; Short story writer
- Spouse(s): Rosemarie Fritzsche (1951–1953, 1953–1954); Inge Müller (1954–1966); Ginka Tscholakowa (1967–1986); Brigitte Maria Mayer (1992–1995)
- Writing career
- Genres: Postdramatic theatre Non-Aristotelian drama Dialectical theatre Poetry; Short stories Interviews
- Notable works: Hamletmachine; The Mission; Quartet
- Movements: Postmodern; Postdramatic theatre

Heiner Müller (German: [haɪnɐ ˈmʏlɐ]; 9 January 1929 – 30 December 1995) was a German (formerly East German) dramatist, poet, writer, essayist and theatre director. His "enigmatic, fragmentary pieces" are a significant contribution to postmodern drama and postdramatic theatre.

== Life and career ==
Müller was born in Eppendorf, Saxony. He joined the Social Democratic Party of Germany in 1946 which was in the course of the forced merger of the KPD and SPD subsumed into the Socialist Unity Party of Germany (Sozialistische Einheitspartei Deutschlands, SED). He was soon expelled for lacking enthusiasm and failing to pay dues. In 1954 he became member of the German Writers' Association (Deutscher Schriftstellerverband). Müller became one of the most important dramatists of the German Democratic Republic and won the Heinrich Mann Prize in 1959 and the Kleist Prize in 1990.

His relationship with the East German state began to deteriorate, however, with his drama Die Umsiedlerin (The Resettler Woman) which was censored in 1961 after only one performance. Müller was expelled from the Writers' Association in the same year. The East German government remained wary of Müller in subsequent years, preventing the premiere of Der Bau (Construction Site) in 1965 and censoring his Mauser in the early 1970s. Yet despite these hardships, Müller's work began to gain popularity both in West Germany and internationally at this time. Many of his best-known plays from this period were premiered in the West: this includes Germania Death in Berlin, which was first performed in 1978 at the Munich Kammerspiele. Heiner Müller himself directed a production of The Mission (Der Auftrag) in Bochum in 1982. In Brussels, Marc Liebens directed the world premiere of Die Hamletmaschine (The Hamletmachine) in 1978, November 7. English translations, first by Helen Fehervary and Marc Silberman, then by Carl Weber, introduced Müller to the English speaking world in the mid- and late 1970s; Müller's controversial play Mauser was first performed in 1975 in Austin, Texas.

On 17 November 1976, Müller signed together with eleven other writers and artists the petition against the expatriation of Wolf Biermann. Like several others of the signatories, Müller withdrew his signature on 25 November, according to Biermann on the condition that the Stasi would keep it secret.

Due to his growing worldwide fame, Müller was able to regain acceptance in East Germany. He was admitted to the DDR Academy of Arts, Berlin in 1984 – only two years before he became a member of parallel West Berlin academy. Despite earlier honors, Müller was not readmitted to the East German Writers' Association until 1988, shortly before the end of the GDR. After the fall of the Wall, Müller became final president of the DDR Academy of the Arts from 1990 until its 1993 merger with the western academy.

In 1993 it was alleged that Müller worked from 1979 to 1990 as unofficial collaborator (an informant) under the code name "Heiner" for the East-German Stasi. Müller, who at the time was not a member of the East German Communist Party or the East German Deutscher Schriftstellerverband, admitted that he had contact with Stasi officials, but never provided any material.

In 1992, he was invited to join the directorate of the Berliner Ensemble, Brecht's former company at the Theater am Schiffbauerdamm, as one of its five members along with Peter Zadek, Peter Palitzsch, Fritz Marquardt and Matthias Langhoff. In 1995, shortly before his death, Müller was appointed as the theatre's sole artistic director.

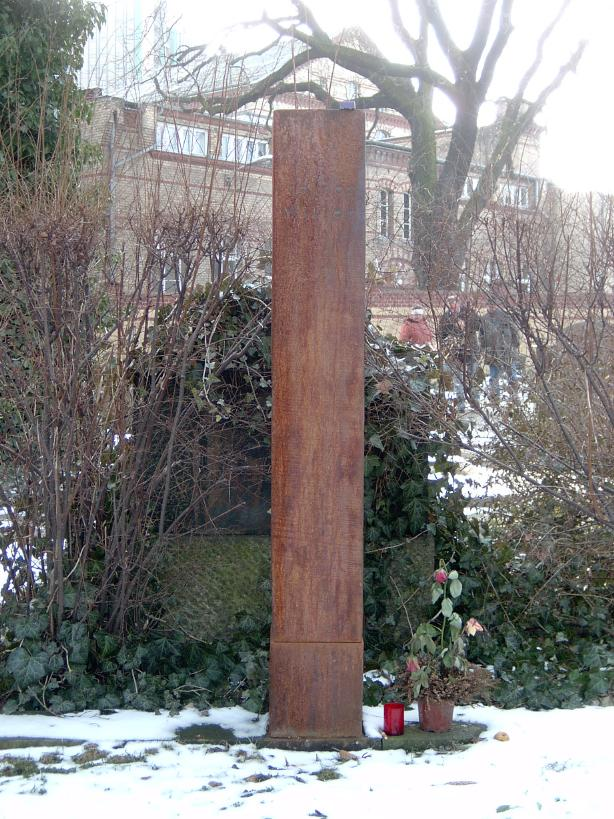
Heiner Müller's grave in Berlin

During the last five years of his life, Müller continued to live in Berlin and work all over Germany and Europe, mostly directing productions of his own works. He wrote few new dramatic texts in this time, though, like Brecht, he did produce much poetry in his final years. In the last half-decade of his life, Müller also worked towards transforming the interview into a literary genre.

Among his better known works, other than those already mentioned, are Der Lohndrücker (The Scab), Wolokolamsker Chaussee (Volokolamsk Highway) Parts I–V, Verkommenes Ufer Medeamaterial Landschaft mit Argonauten (Despoiled Shore Medea Material Landscape with Argonauts), Philoktet (Philoctetes), Zement (Cement), Bildbeschreibung (Description of a Picture aka Explosion of a memory) and Quartett.

In 1994, he was awarded the IV Europe Theatre Prize.

Müller died of throat cancer at the age of 66 in a hospital in Berlin on December 30, 1995. He is buried at Berlin's Dorotheenstadt Cemetery. Müller's grave was designed by his last stage designer Mark Lammert.

== Legacy ==
Over a decade after his death, Müller continues to have an enormous influence on European playwriting, dramaturgy, and performance. In 1998, the journal New German Critique devoted a special issue to his work. He is the only playwright to have ever received such an honor. In 2009, one of Europe’s leading intellectual publishing houses, Suhrkamp, issued the final three volumes in a twelve-volume edition of Müller's collected works.

Müller has also paved the way for a new generation of directors, playwrights, and dramaturgs who regard themselves as "samplers". Müller adopted Brecht's notion of Kopien (German for "copying"), the practice of regarding texts by others as material to be used, imitated, and rewritten. In regards to Brecht's own oeuvre, Müller stated "To use Brecht without criticizing him is treason." For Müller, the work of other writers and artists was not seen as private property; it was to be used as raw material for his own work. Thus, Müller's work in the theater marks the beginning of a tradition of densely poetic dramaturgy based in the logic of association, rather than linear "dramatic" narrative.

Jonathan Kalb, theater critic for The New York Times, describes Müller's legacy on theatre as replacing the "closed" didactical form of the Brechtian parable with "open" dramatic forms offering multiple meanings based, in Hans-Thies Lehmann's words, on a surreal "montage dramaturg ... in which the reality-level of characters and events vacillates hazily between life and dream and the stage becomes a hotbed of spirits and quotes outside any homogeneous notion of space and time." In reference to Müller, Tony Kushner declared, "Write into the void, learn to embrace isolation, in which we may commence undistractedly our dreadful but all-important dialogue with the dead. Forget about love and turn your face to history." With Müller's work, theater is a forum for examining history; it is "a dialogue with the dead".

=== Musical settings ===
Heiner Müller's texts have been set by composers on various occasions. One composer with a particularly strong relationship to his output is Heiner Goebbels, who has collaborated with him directly. Goebbels' Müller settings include the radio plays Despoiled Shore (Verkommenes Ufer, 1984), The Liberation of Prometheus (Die Befreiung des Prometheus, 1985), Volokolamsk Highway (Wolokolamsker Chausse, 1989/90) and The Man in the Elevator (Der Mann im Fahrstuhl, 1988).

In terms of plays turned into operas, Wolfgang Rihm created his version of Die Hamletmaschine in 1987, Pascal Dusapin composed a Medeamaterial (fr) in 1992, and Luca Francesconi's adaptation of Quartett (de) was premiered in 2011.

The German experimental music group Einstürzende Neubauten released its musical radio play adaptation of Die Hamletmaschine in 1991. The Slovenian industrial music group Laibach also collaborated with Müller in his lifetime, and released an album based on in his texts under the name Wir sind das Volk in 2022.

== Awards and honors ==
- 1959: Heinrich Mann Prize jointly with Inge Müller für Lohndrücker/Korrektur
- 1964: Erich-Weinert-Medaille
- 1975: Lessing-Preis of East Germany
- 1979: Mülheimer Dramatikerpreis
- 1984: Karl-Sczuka-Preis jointly with Heiner Goebbels for Verkommenes Ufer
- 1985: Georg Büchner Prize
- 1985: Hörspielpreis der Kriegsblinden jointly with Heiner Goebbels for Die Befreiung des Prometheus
- 1986: National Prize of the German Democratic Republic First Class for Art and Culture
- 1989: Hörspielpreis der Akademie der Künste jointly with Heiner Goebbels for Wolokolamsker Chaussee I–V
- 1990: Kleist Prize
- 1994: Europe Theatre Prize
- 1996: Theaterpreis Berlin (posthumously)

== Major works ==
(Where two dates are offered below, the first gives the date of composition, the second gives the date of the first theatrical production.)

| Title in German | Title in English | Dates | Details |
|---|---|---|---|
| Zehn Tage, die die Welt erschütterten | Ten Days that Shook the World | (1957) | Co-authored with Hagen Mueller-Stahl, after John Reed's book of that name |
| Der Lohndrücker | The Scab | (1958) | with Inge Müller |
| Die Korrektur | The Correction | (1958) | with Inge Müller |
| Die Umsiedlerin | The Resettled Woman | (1961) | a comedy that got Müller expelled from the Writer's Association |
| Der Bau | The Construction Site | (1965/1980) | |
| Sophokles: Oedipus Tyrann | Sophocles: Oedipus the King | (1967) | adaptation of Sophocles' Oedipus Rex |
| Philoktet | Philoctetes | (1968) | Lehrstuck adaptation of Sophocles' tragedy by the same name |
| Der Horatier | The Horatian | (1968/1973) | Lehrstuck based on the same Roman legend that Brecht used for his The Horatians and the Curiatians |
| Lanzelot | Lancelot | (1969) | Libretto with Ginka Tsholakova for opera by Paul Dessau |
| Prometheus | Prometheus | (1969) | translation of tragedy ascribed to Aeschylus |
| Mauser | Mauser | (1970/1975) | Lehrstuck that 'answers' Brecht's The Decision |
| Macbeth | Macbeth | (1971) | adaptation of Shakespeare's play |
| Germania Tod in Berlin | Germania Death in Berlin | (1971/1978) | first utilization of 'synthetic fragment' |
| Zement | Cement | (1972/1973) | adaptation of Feodor Gladkov's 1925 novel |
| Traktor | Tractor | (1974/1975) | revision of text first written between 1955 and 1961 |
| The Battle | The Battle: Scenes from Germany | (1974/1975) | revision of text first written in early 1950s; an 'answer' to Brecht's Fear and Misery of the Third Reich |
| Leben Gundlings Friedrich von Preußen Lessings Schlaf Traum Schrei | Gundling's Life Frederick of Prussia Lessing's Sleep Dream Scream: A Horror Story | (1976/1979) | |
| Die Hamletmaschine | The Hamletmachine | (1977/1979) | |
| Der Auftrag | The Mission | (1979/1980) | |
| Quartett | Quartet | (1981/1982) | based on Laclos's Dangerous Liaisons |
| Verkommenes Ufer Medeamaterial Landschaft mit Argonauten | Despoiled Shore Medea Material Landscape with Argonauts | (1982/1983) | utilizes 'synthetic fragment' structure in version of story of Medea |
| [in English] | the CIVIL warS a tree is best measured when it is down | (1984) | contribution to the Cologne section of Robert Wilson's opera |
| Bildbeschreibung | Explosion of a Memory / Description of a Picture | (1984/1985) | dream narrative utilizing automatic writing in portions of composition |
| Anatomie Titus Fall of Rome Ein Shakespearekommentar | Anatomy Titus Fall of Rome A Shakespeare Commentary | (1985) | adaptation of Shakespeare's Titus Andronicus |
| [in English] | Description of a Picture or Explosion of a Memory | (1986) | Prologue to Robert Wilson's version of Alcestis |
| [in English] | Death Destruction & Detroit II | (1987) | contribution to libretto of Robert Wilson's opera |
| Wolokolamsker Chaussee | Volokolomsk Highway | (1984–1987 / 1988) | cycle of plays also known as The Road of Tanks |
| Hamlet/Maschine | Hamlet/Machine | (1989 / 1990) | combination of translation of Shakespeare's Hamlet and Müller's own Die Hamletmaschine |
| Mommsen's Block | Mommsen's Block | (1992/1994) | a "poem / performance text" |
| Germania 3 Gespenster am toten Mann | Germania 3 Ghosts at Dead Man | (1995/1996) | produced posthumously |

== Stage productions directed by Heiner Müller ==
- The Mission (Der Auftrag), Volksbühne am Rosa-Luxemburg-Platz, Berlin/GDR, 1980–1983 [German premiere; directed with Ginka Tscholakowa]
- The Mission (Der Auftrag), Schauspielhaus Bochum, 1982 [directed with Ginka Tscholakowa]
- Macbeth, Volksbühne am Rosa-Luxemburg-Platz, Berlin/GDR, 1982–1985 [Müller's translation and adaptation of William Shakespeare's Macbeth; directed with Ginka Tscholakowa]
- The Scab (Der Lohndrücker), Deutsches Theater, Berlin/GDR, 1988–1991 [production also included Müller's The Horatian (Der Horatier) and Volokolomsk Highway IV, Centaurs (Wolokolamsker Chaussee IV, Kentauren)]
- Hamlet/Machine (Hamlet/Maschine), Deutsches Theater, Berlin/GDR, 1990–1993 [Müller's translation of William Shakespeare's Hamlet staged with the East German premiere of Müller's own Hamletmachine]
- Mauser, Deutsches Theater, Berlin, 1991–1993 [production also included Müller's Herakles 2 or the Hydra (Herakles 2 oder die Hydra), Quartet (Quartett), and Volokolomsk Highway V, The Foundling (Wolokolamsker Chaussee V, Der Findling)]
- Duell Traktor Fatzer, Berliner Ensemble, Berlin 1993–1996 [the production was composed of Müller's Volokolomsk Highway III, The Duel (Wolokolamsker Chaussee III, Das Duell), Mommsens Block, and Tractor (Traktor), as well as his working of Brecht's fragmentary Downfall of the Egotist Johann Fatzer]
- Richard Wagner's Tristan und Isolde at Bayreuth Festspielhaus 1993–1999 conducted by Daniel Barenboim
- Quartet (Quartett), Berliner Ensemble, Berlin, 1994–1997
- Bertolt Brecht's The Resistible Rise of Arturo Ui (Der aufhaltsame Aufstieg des Arturo Ui), Berliner Ensemble, Berlin, 1995–present

== Bibliography ==
- Müller, Heiner. 1984. Hamletmachine and Other Texts for the Stage. Ed. and trans. Carl Weber. New York: Performing Arts Journal Publications. ISBN 0-933826-45-1.
- Müller, Heiner. 1989a. Explosion of a Memory: Writings by Heiner Müller. Ed. and trans. Carl Weber. New York: Performing Arts Journal Publications. ISBN 1-55554-041-4.
- Müller, Heiner. 1989b. The Battle: Plays, Prose, Poems by Heiner Müller. Ed. and trans. Carl Weber. New York: Performing Arts Journal Publications. ISBN 1-55554-049-X.
- Müller, Heiner. 1990. Germania. Trans. Bernard Schütze and Caroline Schütze. Ed. Sylvère Lotringer. Semiotext(e) Foreign Agents Ser. New York: Semiotext(e). ISBN 0-936756-63-2.
- Müller, Heiner. 1995. Theatremachine. Ed. and trans. Marc von Henning. London and Boston: Faber. ISBN 0-571-17528-7.
- Müller, Heiner. 2001. A Heiner Müller Reader: Plays | Poetry | Prose. Ed. and trans. Carl Weber. PAJ Books Ser. Baltimore and London: The Johns Hopkins University Press. ISBN 0-8018-6578-6.
- Müller, Heiner. 2011. Three Plays: Philoctetes, The Horatian, Mauser. Trans. Nathaniel McBride. London: Seagull Books. ISBN 1-906497-82-6.
- Müller, Heiner. 2012. Heiner Müller after Shakespeare. Trans. Carl Weber and Paul David Young. New York: Performing Arts Journal Publications. ISBN 978-1-55554-152-1.
