= Refunctioning =

Refunctioning (German: Umfunktionierung) is a core strategy of the aesthetic developed by the German modernist theatre practitioner Bertolt Brecht.

"Brecht wanted his theatre to intervene in the process of shaping society," Robert Leach explains, so in his work:

[the] duality of form and content was replaced (to over-schematise briefly) by a triad of content (better described in Brecht's case by the formalist term "material"), form (again the formalist term "technique" is more useful here) and function. In Brecht's dramatic form, these three constantly clash but never properly coalesce to compose a rounded whole.

== Sources ==
- Brecht, Bertolt. 1964. Brecht on Theatre: The Development of an Aesthetic. Ed. and trans. John Willett. British edition. London: Methuen. ISBN 0-413-38800-X. USA edition. New York: Hill and Wang. ISBN 0-8090-3100-0.
- Brecht, Bertolt. 1965. The Messingkauf Dialogues. Trans. John Willett. Bertolt Brecht: Plays, Poetry, Prose Ser. London: Methuen, 1985. ISBN 0-413-38890-5.
- Leach, Robert. 1994. "Mother Courage and Her Children". In Thomson and Sacks (1994, 128–138).
- Thomson, Peter and Glendyr Sacks, eds. 1994. The Cambridge Companion to Brecht. Cambridge Companions to Literature Ser. Cambridge: Cambridge University Press. ISBN 0-521-41446-6.
- Tian, Min. 2012. Mei Lanfang and the Twentieth Century International Stage: Chinese Theatre Placed and Displaced. New York: Palgrave Macmillan.
