= Lehrstücke =

Radical and experimental form of modernist theatre developed by Bertolt Brecht

The Lehrstücke (German pronunciation: [ˈleːɐ̯ʃtʏkə]; singular Lehrstück) are a radical and experimental form of modernist theatre developed by Bertolt Brecht and his collaborators from the 1920s to the late 1930s. The Lehrstücke stem from Brecht's epic theatre techniques but as a core principle explore the possibilities of learning through acting, playing roles, adopting postures and attitudes etc. and hence no longer divide between actors and audience. Brecht himself translated the term as learning-play, emphasizing the aspect of learning through participation, whereas the German term could be understood as teaching-play. Reiner Steinweg goes so far as to suggest adopting a term coined by the Brazilian avant garde theatre director Zé Celso, Theatre of Discovery, as being even clearer.

== Definition ==
Although the texts have a highly formal, rigorous structure, this is designed to facilitate insertions or deletions (according to the exigencies of the particular project). With no actor–audience separation, the emphasis in performance is upon the process rather than upon evincing a final product. This diminishes an alienating division within the theatrical apparatus—characteristically deployed in bourgeois society, and involving a fourth wall—a virtual wall that facilitates, and encourages, a distinction between producers and artistic labourers versus their means of production. The terms of that relationship are contradictory, insofar as ownership of the means of production alienates the labour of the artist. The distinction is no longer operative in the Lehrstücke, Brecht argues.

The primary purpose, intention, or goal of these performances is for the actors to acquire attitudes (rather than to consume an entertainment). This relates to Brecht's theory of Gestus, his substitution for traditional drama's mimesis. The relation to reality is a critical one. Brecht's refunctioned mimesis is understood not as a simple mirroring or imitation, but as a measuring; it always involves some kind of attitude on our part. It is not possible, in Brecht's view, to produce a neutral mimesis. Brecht's poem "On Imitation" elaborates this notion succinctly:

He who only imitates and has nothing to say
On what he imitates is like
A poor chimpanzee, who imitates his trainer's smoking
And does not smoke while doing so. For never
Will a thoughtless imitation
Be a real imitation.

Brecht also often had questionnaires handed out at the end of the performances, and would rewrite the plays based on the audiences' answers to them.

Ideally, the Lehrstücke project tries to set up a whole series of new dialectical relations. Firstly, the relation between form and content is subsumed or synthesised into a higher dialectic of function; "the means have to be asked what the end is". It thus attempts to side step the whole form and content question in favour of one concerning function. The actor–audience interaction is supposed to become dialectical, as is that between the actor and the text. Principles of interaction govern these two relations.

Brecht eventually abandoned his experiments with the Lehrstücke form, but it has been taken up and developed in the last few decades by the postmodernist dramatist Heiner Müller (in plays such as Mauser (1975) and The Mission (1982)) and by the Brazilian director Augusto Boal. Boal's "forum theatre" took the abolition of the actor–audience division proposed by Brecht and realized it through the use of what he calls a "spect-actor"—a member of the audience who is able to get up onto the stage to actively intervene in the drama presented. The theatrical experience becomes a collective experiment and search for solutions to social problems experienced by the audience.

The German peace researcher Reiner Steinweg de used his seminal analysis of the Lehrstücke form in the work of Brecht (Das Lehrstück. Brechts Theorie einer politisch-ästhetischen Erziehung) to develop his own self-reflexive peace-activist educational work, which initiated his local activism project "Gewalt in der Stadt".

== Some of Brecht's Lehrstücke ==
- The Flight across the Ocean
- The Yes Sayer and The No Sayer
- The Horatians and the Curiatians
- The Baden-Baden Lesson on Consent
- The Decision
- The Exception and the Rule
- Round Heads and Pointed Heads

== See also ==
- Walter Benjamin
- Augusto Boal and his Theatre of the Oppressed
