= Frank Castorf =

German theatre director

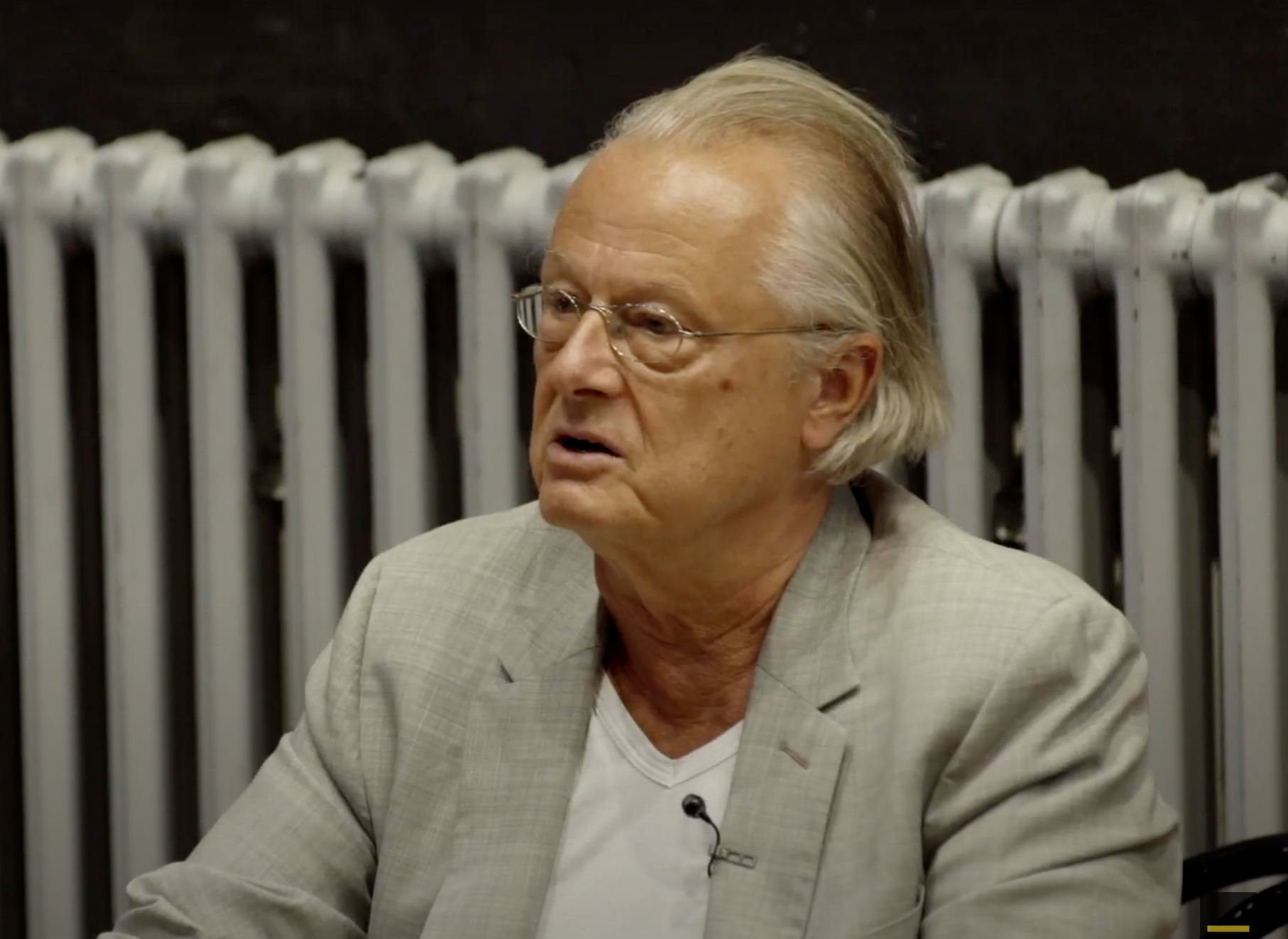
- Castorf in 2019
- Born: 17 July 1951 (age 75); East Berlin, East Germany
- Occupation: Theatre director

Frank Castorf (born 17 July 1951 in East Berlin) is a German theater director and was the artistic director of the Volksbühne am Rosa-Luxemburg-Platz from 1992 to 2015. His work is often associated with postdramatic theatre.

== Biography ==
=== Early years ===
Castorf's father was an ironmonger. Frank Castorf successfully completed his schooling in 1969/70, entering training for railway work. Between 1970 and 1972 he undertook military service with the army's National Border Force.

Then, between 1971 and 1976, he attended the Humboldt University of Berlin, studying theatrology. His teachers included Ernst Schumacher, Rudolf Münz and Joachim Fiebach. His diploma dissertation, which was formally commended, was entitled "Ground Rules for the 'Development' of Ionesco's Global Ideological Perspective and Artistic-Aesthetic Position". He made numerous culturally focused visits to Poland during this period.

In 1989, Klaus Pierwoß brought Castorf with a production of Hamlet to Schauspiel Köln, Cologne.

In 2013, he directed a "deliberately incoherent" production of the Ring Cycle at the Bayreuth Wagner Festival, which was booed by the audience.

== Literature ==
Secondary material

- Hans-Thies Lehmann: Postdramatic Theatre. translated and with an introduction by Karen Jübs-Munby, Routledge, London and New York 2006, ISBN 978-0-415-26813-4.
