= Stephen Hinton =

British-American musicologist

- Born: January 1955 (age 71); London, England
- Education: University of Birmingham, England
- Known for: Scholarship on Kurt Weill, German music history, work on Paul Hindemith and Ludwig van Beethoven
- Awards: 2013 Kurt Weill Book Prize
- Scientific career
- Fields: Musicology
- Workplaces: Stanford University
- Doctoral advisor: Nigel Fortune

Stephen Hinton (born January 1955) is a British-American musicologist and the Avalon Foundation Professor in the Humanities at Stanford University, where he serves as Professor of Music and, by courtesy, of German Studies. His research focuses on modern German music, aesthetics, and music theory, with particular emphasis on the works of Kurt Weill, Paul Hindemith, and Ludwig van Beethoven.

His book Weill's Musical Theater: Stages of Reform (2012) received the Kurt Weill Book Prize, and in 2025 he was named a Berlin Prize Fellow at the American Academy in Berlin.

== Early life and education ==
Hinton was born in London in 1955. He studied music and German at the University of Birmingham, receiving a BA in 1978. He completed a PhD in Musicology in 1984 under Nigel Fortune.

== Academic career ==
Hinton was affiliated with the Technische Universität Berlin from 1982 to 1990. He served as Tutor in Musicology from 1982 to 1984 and as research assistant to Carl Dahlhaus from 1984 to 1986. He held a postdoctoral fellowship from the Deutsche Forschungsgemeinschaft and was appointed wissenschaftlicher Assistent.

In 1990, Hinton joined the faculty of Yale University. In 1994, he was appointed to the faculty at Stanford University. He became Chairman of the Department of Music (1997–2004, 2020-2021, and 2022–24), Senior Associate Dean for Humanities and Arts in the School of Humanities & Sciences (2006–2010), and Denning Family Director of the Stanford Arts Institute (2011–2015). He has served as editor of the academic journal Beethoven Forum and is an affiliated faculty member at The Europe Center at Stanford.

Hinton was awarded the Kurt Weill Book Prize in 2013 for Weill’s Musical Theater: Stages of Reform. In 2025, he was named a Berlin Prize Fellow at the American Academy in Berlin.

== Research ==
=== Kurt Weill ===
Hinton’s work on Kurt Weill includes the musicological study Weill's Musical Theater: Stages of Reform (University of California Press, 2012). A revised German edition, Kurt Weills Musiktheater: vom Songspiel zur American Opera, was published by Suhrkamp in 2023.

He has contributed to the Kurt Weill Edition, co-editing the critical edition of Die Dreigroschenoper (The Threepenny Opera) with Edward Harsh and the edition of Weill's Happy End with Elmar Juchem. With Jürgen Schebera, he also edited Weill’s collected writings, published as Musik und musikalisches Theater: Gesammelte Schriften (2000).

=== Hindemith and Beethoven ===
Hinton has published extensively on Paul Hindemith, including editions of the Symphonie “Mathis der Maler” and the Philharmonisches Konzert for the Paul Hindemith Collected Works. His Beethoven scholarship includes the articles "Not Which Tones? The Crux of Beethoven's Ninth" (1998) and "Adorno's Unfinished Beethoven" (1996).

=== Digital projects ===
In collaboration with the St. Lawrence String Quartet, Hinton developed the edX online course series Defining the String Quartet, with installments focusing on Joseph Haydn (2016) and Ludwig van Beethoven (2019).

== Selected publications ==
=== Books ===
- The Idea of Gebrauchsmusik (New York: Garland, 1989)
- Kurt Weill: The Threepenny Opera (Cambridge Opera Handbooks, Cambridge: Cambridge University Press, 1990)
- Weill's Musical Theater: Stages of Reform (Berkeley: University of California Press, 2012)
- Kurt Weills Musiktheater: vom Songspiel zur American Opera (Berlin: Suhrkamp, 2023)

=== Edited volumes and editions ===
- (with Jürgen Schebera) Kurt Weill, Musik und Theater: Gesammelte Schriften (Berlin, 1990); revised as Musik und musikalisches Theater: Gesammelte Schriften (Mainz: Schott, 2000)
- Paul Hindemith, Orchesterwerke 1932–34: Philharmonisches Konzert; Symphonie “Mathis der Maler,” Sämtliche Werke II/2 (Mainz: Schott, 1991)
- (with Edward Harsh) Kurt Weill, Die Dreigroschenoper, Kurt Weill Edition I/5 (Miami: European American Music, 2000); revised edition as study score (Vienna: Universal Edition, 2006)
- (with Elmar Juchem) Kurt Weill, Happy End, Kurt Weill Edition (Miami: European American Music, 2020)

=== Selected articles and book chapters ===
- “The Concept of Epic Opera: Theoretical Anomalies in the Brecht-Weill Partnership,” Festschrift Carl Dahlhaus, ed. H. Danuser et al. (Laaber: Laaber-Verlag, 1988), 283-94
- “Hindemith: Pedagogy and Personal Style,” Hindemith-Jahrbuch 17 (1992): 54- 67
- “Hanns Eisler and the Ideology of Modern Music,” New Music and Ideology, ed. by M. Delaere (Wilhelmshaven: Noetzel, 1995), 79-85
- "Adorno's Unfinished Beethoven," Beethoven Forum 5 (1996): 139–53
- "Not Which Tones? The Crux of Beethoven's Ninth," 19th-Century Music 22, no. 1 (1998): 61–77
- "Hindemith, Bach, and the Melancholy of Obligation," Bach Perspectives 3: Creative Responses to Bach, from Mozart to Hindemith (1998): 133-50
- "Zur Epistemologie des Ursatzes", Musik und Verstehen, ed. C. v. Blumröder et al. (Laaber: Laaber Verlag, 2004), 74-83
- "The Emancipation of Dissonance: Schoenberg's Two Practices of Composition," Music & Letters 91, no. 4 (2010): 568–79
- "Schoenberg's Harmonielehre: Psychology and Comprehensibility," in Tonality 1900–1950: Concept and Practice, ed. F. Wörner, U. Scheideler, and P. Rupprecht (Stuttgart: Steiner, 2012), 113–24
- (with Nick Zangwill) "Beauty," in The Oxford Handbook of Western Music and Philosophy, ed. T. McAuley et al. (Oxford: Oxford University Press, 2020), 941-66
- "Music in the Age of Mechanical Reproduction and the Historiography of the Middle," in The Oxford Handbook of Music and the Middlebrow, ed. K. Tanner and C. Chowrimootoo (Oxford: Oxford University Press, 2023), 23-43
