= Carl Weber (theatre director) =

German theatre director (1925–2016)

Carl Weber (7 August 1925 – 25 December 2016) was a theatre director and a professor of drama at Stanford University. He was Bertolt Brecht's directing assistant and a dramaturg and actor at the Berliner Ensemble theatre company in 1952. After Brecht's death in 1956, Weber remained as a director of the company. He directed in major theatres in Germany, America, Canada and elsewhere since 1957. He produced English translations of German dramatist Heiner Müller.

He was born in Dortmund, Germany, and died in Los Altos, California.

== Plays directed ==
- The Day of the Great Scholar Wu, Berliner Ensemble, Berlin, Germany, 1955
- Private Life of the Master Race, Berliner Ensemble, 1957
- Puntila, Friedrich Wolf Theater, Neu-Strelitz, Germany, 1958
- Mad Money, Luebeck, Germany, 1959
- Mother Courage, Luebeck, 1960
- Die Hose, Deutsches Theater, Berlin, Germany, 1961
- Trumpets and Drums, Luebeck, 1962
- Andorra, Luebeck, 1962
- The Parasite, Luebeck, 1962
- The General's Dog, Luebeck, 1963, then Wuppertal, 1964
- The Big Ear, Luebeck, 1963
- Threepenny Opera, Aarhus, Denmark, 1963
- The Caucasian Chalk Circle, Actors Workshop, San Francisco, CA, 1963
- The Tutor, Memorial Auditorium, Stanford, CA, 1963, then Wuppertal, 1967
- The Country Wife, Front Street Theatre, Memphis, TN, 1964
- Two Gentlemen of Verona, Little Theatre, Stanford, CA, 1964
- Woyzeck, Wuppertal, 1964
- Incident at Vichy, Wuppertal, 1965
- Gaspar Varro's Right, Wuppertal, 1965
- The Snob, Aalborg, Denmark, 1966
- Drums in the Night, University of California at Los Angeles, 1966
- Chicken Soup with Barley, Schaubuehne, Berlin, Germany, 1966
- The Birdlovers, National Theatre, Oslo, Norway, 1966
- A Man Is a Man, Aalborg, Denmark, 1967
- Cyrano de Bergerac, Repertory Theatre of Lincoln Center, New York City, 1968
- Enrico IV, Yale Repertory Theatre, New Haven, CT, 1968
- The Caucasian Chalk Circle, Asian Theatre Institute, New Delhi, India, 1968
- The Miser, Repertory Theatre of Lincoln Center, 1968
- The Empire Builders, National Theatre of Canada, Ottawa, Quebec, Canada, 1970
- The Forest, Wuppertal, 1970
- Naechtliche Huldigung, Schauspielhaus Zurich, Zurich, Switzerland, 1970
- Die Hose, Schauspielhaus, Hamburg, Germany, 1970
- Soldaten, Kammerspiele, Munich, Germany, 1970
- The Madman and the Nun, Seventh Street Theatre, New York University, 1971
- Ride across Lake Constance, Repertory Theatre of Lincoln Center, 1972
- Kaspar, Brooklyn Academy of Music, Brooklyn, NY, 1973
- The Waterhen, Brooklyn Academy of Music, 1973
- The Entertainer, McCarter Theatre, Princeton, NJ, 1973
- The Resistible Rise of Arturo Ui, Arena Stage, Washington, DC, 1974
- Die Raeumung, Wuppertal, 1974
- Julius Caesar, Arena Stage, 1975
- JoAnne, Theatre at Riverside Church, New York City, 1976
- Lincoln, Brooklyn Academy of Music, 1976
- Heaven and Earth, Off-Center Theatre, New York City, 1977
- Scenes from Country Life, Perry Street Theatre, New York City, 1978
- Starluster, American Place Theatre, New York City, 1979
- They Are Dying Out, Yale Repertory Theatre, 1979
- Fueherbunker, American Place Theatre, 1981

Here the NY Times Mel Gussow's review:

https://www.nytimes.com/1981/06/03/theater/stage-snodgrass-s-fuehrer-bunker.html

- The Broken Pitcher, Martinique Theatre, New York City, 1981
- The Resistible Rise of Arturo Ui, Bad Staattestheater, Karlsruhe, Germany, 1982
- Happy End, New York University, Second Avenue Theatre, New York City, 1984
- Arden of Faversham, Little Theatre, Stanford, CA, 1986
- The Affair in the Rue de Lourcine, Nitery, Stanford, 1989
- The Physicists, Little Theatre, 1991
- In the Jungle of the Cities, Little Theatre, 1994
- Between East and West, Magic Theatre, San Francisco, CA, 1997
- The Threepenny Opera, Memorial Auditorium, Stanford, 1999

== Major Tours ==
Toured as assistant director of Berliner Ensemble in Poland, 1952, Paris, France, 1954 and 1958, London, England, 1956, Moscow and Leningrad, U.S.S.R.(now Russia), 1957, Prague, Czechoslovakia (now the Czech Republic), 1958, Stockholm, Sweden, 1959, and Helsinki, Finland, 1959; toured as director with Buehnen der Hansestadt Luebeck in Denmark, 1960, 1961, and 1963.

== Stage appearances ==
- Young peasant, Mother Courage, Berliner Ensemble, 1952
- La Fontaine, Der Prozess der Jeanne d'Arc, Berliner Ensemble, 1953
- Secretary Kan Dshen, Hirse fuer die Achte, Berliner Ensemble, 1954
- Bizergan Kazbeki, The Caucasian Chalk Circle, Berliner Ensemble, 1955
- First tank Commander, Winterschlacht, Berliner Ensemble, 1955
- Pickpocket, Trumpets and Drums, Berliner Ensemble, 1955
- Young man, Mother Courage, Palace Theatre, London, England, 1956
- Mucius, Life of Galileo, Berliner Ensemble, 1957
- Various roles, The Investigation, Wuppertal, 1966

== Television work ==
Director

- Laughter in Mexico, Fernsehfunk (Berlin, Germany), 1957
- Die Unadlige Graefin, Fernsehfunk, 1958
- Infamien durch Melodien, Fernsehfunk, 1959
- Wasser fuer Canitoga, Fernsehfunk, 1960
- Falsch Baerte und Nasen, Fernsehfunk, 1961
- The Countess, Fernsehfunk

== Television appearances ==
Episodic

- Narrator, "Brecht and Handke and the Kabarett," Camera Three, CBS, 1972
- Narrator, "Peter Handke-Theatre and Ideas," Camera Three, CBS, 1973

== Written works ==
Stage Plays

- (with Peter Palitzsch) The Day of the Great Scholar Wu, Berliner Ensemble, 1955
- (Editor and translator) Heiner Mueller, Hamletmaschine and other texts for the stage, Performing Arts Journal Publications (New York City), 1984
- (Editor and translator) Heiner Mueller, The Battle: Plays, Poetry, Prose by Heiner Mueller, Performing Arts Journal Publications, 1989
- (Editor and translator) Heiner Mueller, Explosion of Memory: Writings by Heiner Mueller, Performing Arts Journal Publications, 1989
- (Editor and translator) DramaContemporary: Germany, Johns HopkinsUniversity Press (Baltimore, MD), 1996

Teleplays

Episodic

- "Brecht and Handke and the Kabarett," Camera Three, CBS, 1972
- "Peter Handke-Theatre and Ideas," Camera Three, CBS, 1973

== See also ==
- Epic theater
- Fabel
