= Peter Palitzsch =

German theatre director and theatre manager

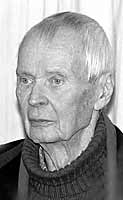
- Palitzsch in 2004
- Born: 11 September 1918; Deutmannsdorf, Silesia, German Empire
- Died: 18 December 2004 (aged 86); Havelberg, Germany
- Occupations: Theatre director; Theatre manager
- Organizations: Berliner Ensemble; Staatstheater Stuttgart; Schauspiel Frankfurt; Berliner Theatertreffen
- Awards: Theaterpreis Berlin; Order of Merit of the Federal Republic of Germany

Peter Palitzsch (11 September 1918 – 18 December 2004) was a German theatre director. He worked with Bertolt Brecht in his Berliner Ensemble from the beginning in 1949, and was in demand internationally as a representative of Brecht's ideas. He was a theatre manager at the Staatstheater Stuttgart and the Schauspiel Frankfurt. Many of his productions were invited to the Berliner Theatertreffen festival. He worked internationally from 1980.

== Life ==
Born in Deutmannsdorf near Löwenberg, Silesia, the son of a merchant, Palitzsch grew up in Dresden. After gymnasium, he attended a Fachschule to become a graphic artist for advertisement. He ran an advertising agency together with his brother Hans Heinrich Palitzsch. He served in the military for five years and was a prisoner of war for a short time. When he returned to the destroyed Dresden, he was among the founders of the local chapter of the Red Cross. He began his career at the theatre in 1945 as a dramaturge for the Dresdner Volksbühne.

Bertolt Brecht called him in 1949 as graphic designer, dramaturge and assistant to his new Berliner Ensemble, which then still played at various stages in Berlin. In 1954, they moved to their own house, the Theater am Schiffbauerdamm. Palitzsch designed the logo which still is installed on the top of the building. In 1955, he was stage director for the first time, with Der große Tag des Gelehrten Wu. In 1956, he directed John Millington Synge's Der Held der westlichen Welt (The Playboy of the Western World) with Heinz Schubert in the title role. He collaborated with Manfred Wekwerth for several plays.

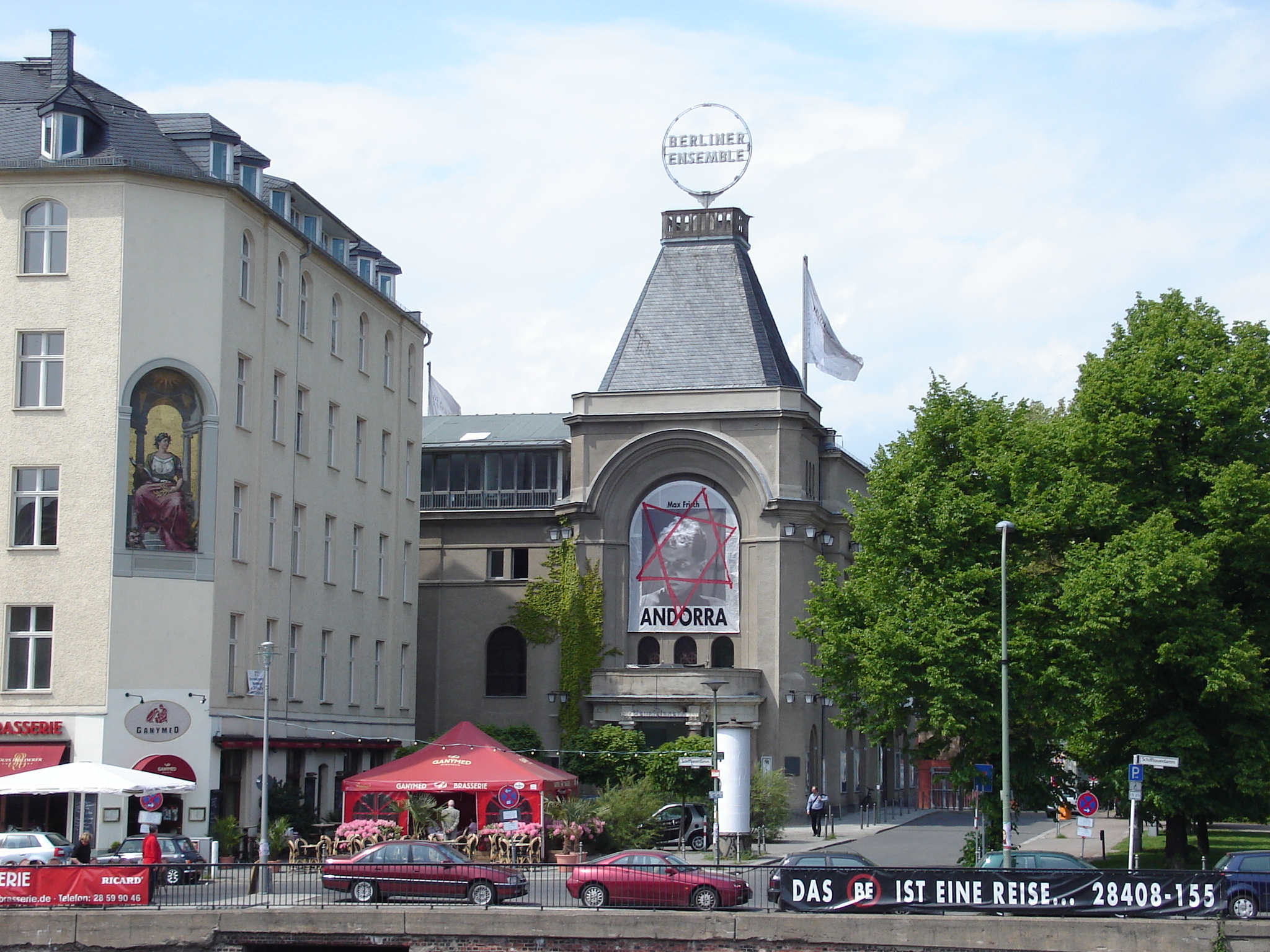
Theater am Schiffbauerdamm of the Berliner Ensemble, with Palitzsch's logo on top

After Brecht's death on 18 August 1956, Palitzsch also worked at other German theatres. He staged the world premiere of Brecht's Der aufhaltsame Aufstieg des Arturo Ui (The Resistible Rise of Arturo Ui) at the Staatstheater Stuttgart in November 1958, with Wolfgang Kieling in the title role. The play was shown in Berlin in 1959, with Ekkehard Schall in the title role, and in Paris and London in 1960, where it marked Palitzsch's international recognition. In Paris, the production was awarded the Preis des Theaters der Nationen.

In 1960/61, Wekwerth and Palitzsch produced with the DEFA a film Mutter Courage und ihre Kinder, starring Helene Weigel, Angelika Hurwicz, Regine Lutz, Ernst Busch, Wolf Kaiser, Ekkehard Schall and Heinz Schubert. The film received a special award (Prize of the Jury or Anerkennungspreis) at the Locarno Film Festival in 1961.

Palitzsch was called to West Germany, as a representative of authentic productions of Brecht's plays. He staged Eduard II in Stuttgart, Mann ist Mann (Man Equals Man) in Wuppertal, and Der Kaukasische Kreidekreis (The Caucasian Chalk Circle) and Der gute Mensch von Sezuan (The Good Person of Szechwan) in Ulm. On 1 September 1961, shortly after the Berlin Wall, he directed there the West German premiere of Brecht's The Trial of Joan of Arc at Rouen, 1431 (after an audio play by Anna Seghers), while other theatres refrained from playing Brecht's works, due to the political situation. After the first performance, Palitzsch announced via Intendant Kurt Hübner that he would not return to East Germany.

In 1961, he directed Der kaukasische Kreidekreis in Oslo, with the young Liv Ullmann. He staged Büchner's Dantons Tod (Danton's Death) in Stuttgart in 1962, and Brecht's Mutter Courage in Cologne in 1964, with Ursula von Reibnitz in the title role. In 1966, he directed there Brecht's Herr Puntila und sein Knecht Matti (Mr Puntila and his Man Matti) with Hanns Ernst Jäger and Traugott Buhre in the title roles. His Stuttgart world premiere of Martin Walser's Der schwarze Schwan was invited to the Berliner Theatertreffen.

From 1 January 1966, Palitzsch was manager of drama (Schauspieldirektor) at the Staatstheater Stuttgart. His first production there of two works by Shakespeare combined as Rosenkriege I + II (Henry VI and Eduard IV) was invited to the Berliner Theatertreffen in 1967. He staged in 1968 Isaac Babel's Marija, in 1969 the world premiere of Tankred Dorst Toller, and in 1970 Diese Geschichte von Ihnen (This Story of Yours) by John Hopkins. All three productions were invited to the Berliner Theatertreffen. His regular set designer was Wilfried Minks. In June 1972, he left Stuttgart with a production of Shakespeare's Hamlet.

Palitzsch moved on to the Schauspiel Frankfurt, where he could realise theatre in codetermination (Mitbestimmungstheater). He directed there Lessing's Emilia Galotti in 1972, Wedekind's Frühlings Erwachen (Spring Awakening) in 1974, again invited to the Berliner Theatertreffen, and Brecht's Die Tage der Commune in 1977. He staged Ibsen's Baumeister Solneß (The Master Builder) in 1978, and Schiller's Don Carlos in 1979. Tensions within the leading team caused him to resign in 1980. During the following years, he worked freelance internationally, including Vienna where he staged at the Burgtheater, in Zürich, Rio de Janeiro and again Oslo. After the German reunification, Palitzsch returned to Berlin in 1992, where he shared the management of the Berliner Ensemble with Peter Zadek, Fritz Marquardt, Matthias Langhoff and Heiner Müller until 1995.

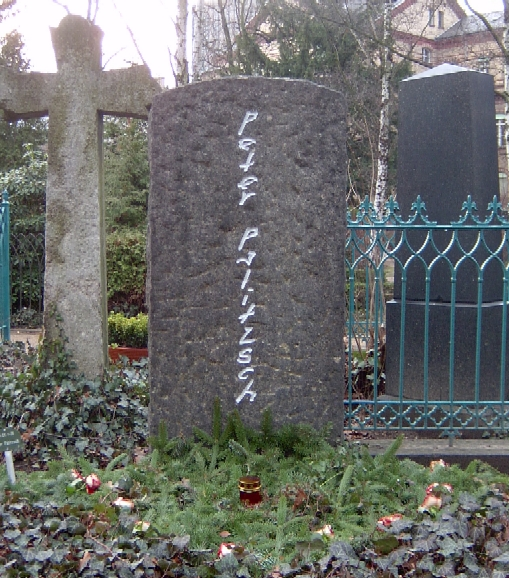
Tomb on the Dorotheenstädtischer Friedhof

Palitzsch was awarded the Order of Merit of the Federal Republic of Germany on 6 September 2004, after having received the Theaterpreis Berlin in 1991. He died in Havelberg on 18 December 2004.

== Palitzsch's works at the Berliner Theatertreffen ==
Several production directed by Palitzsch were invited to the Berliner Thatertreffen festival, including:

- Martin Walser: Der schwarze Schwan (The Black Swan, Staatstheater Stuttgart, 1965)
- William Shakespeare: Henry VI (Stuttgart, 1967)
- William Shakespeare: Edward IV (Stuttgart, 1967)
- Isaak Babel: Marija (Stuttgart, 1968)
- Tankred Dorst: Toller (Stuttgart, 1969)
- John Hopkins: Diese Geschichte von Ihnen (This Story of Yours, Stuttgart, 1970)
- Samuel Beckett: Warten auf Godot (Waiting for Godot, Stuttgart, 1972)
- Frank Wedekind: Frühlings Erwachen (Spring Awakening, Städtische Bühnen Frankfurt, 1974)

== Literature ==
- Rainer Mennicken: Peter Palitzsch. Fischer Verlag, Frankfurt am Main 1993, in: Regie im Theater, ISBN 3-596-11114-5
- Peter Iden: Peter Palitzsch – Theater muss die Welt verändern. Henschel Verlag, Berlin 2005, ISBN 3-89487-511-9
- Christoph Nix: Immer scheitern, besser scheitern. Zum 80. Geburtstag von Peter Palitzsch, in: Die Tageszeitung, 11 September 1998
- Wolfgang Bittner, Mark vom Hofe: Der Vorhang geht nicht auf, damit sich Leute unterhalten. Peter Palitzsch, in: Ich mische mich ein. Markante deutsche Lebensläufe, Bad Honnef 2006, ISBN 978-3-89502-222-7
