= Barbara Brecht-Schall =

German actress (1930–2015)

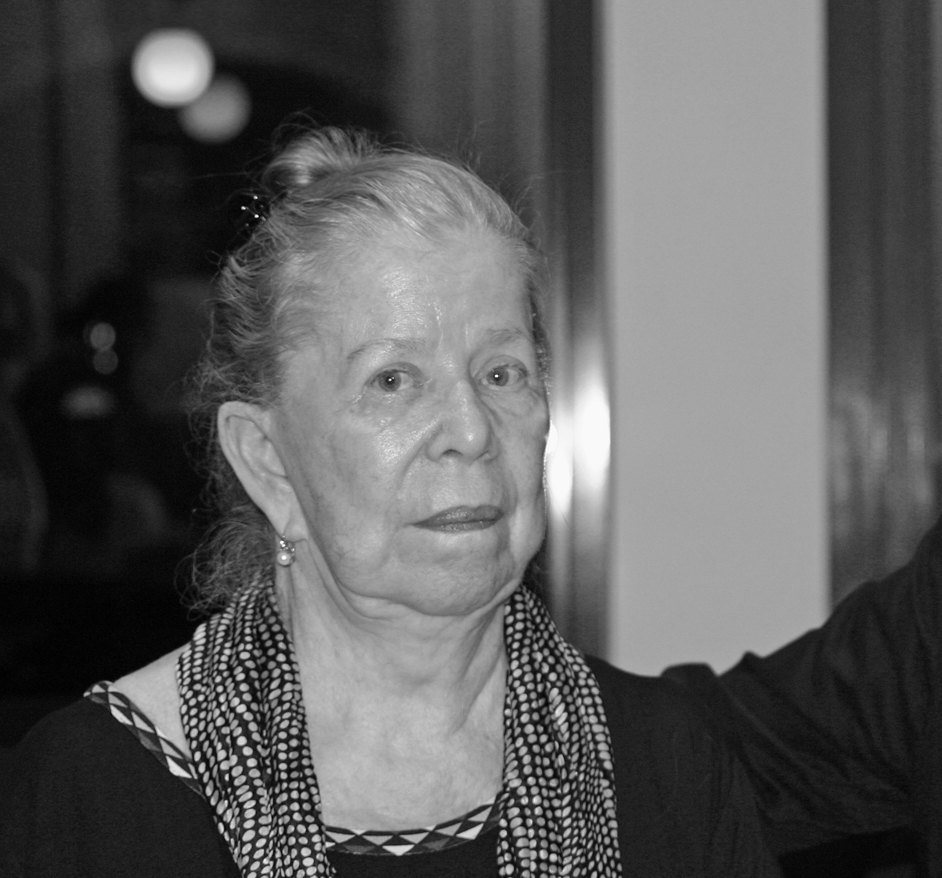
- Brecht-Schall in September 2014
- Born: Barbara Marie Brecht; 28 October 1930; Berlin, Germany
- Died: 31 August 2015 (aged 84); Berlin, Germany
- Occupation: Actress
- Spouse: Ekkehard Schall
- Parents: Bertolt Brecht; Helene Weigel

Barbara Brecht-Schall (28 October 1930 – 31 August 2015) was a German actress.

== Early life ==
Brecht was born in Berlin to Bertolt Brecht and Helene Weigel, she had three siblings, a full brother Stefan, a half-brother Frank Banholzer and a half-sister Hanne Hiob.

At the age of 3, her family travelled often in attempt to avoid the Nazi regime. They eventually arrived in Los Angeles, but in 1947 shortly after Bertolt Brecht testified in front of the House Committee on Un-American Activities. Her father established the Berliner Ensemble in 1949, a theatre company in which she also acted.

== Later life ==
Brecht later married Ekkehard Schall, with whom she had two daughters, Johanna Schall and Jenny Schall-Dizdari.

== Selected filmography ==
- Ein Polterabend (1955)
- Berlin, Schoenhauser Corner (1957)
- Castles and Cottages (1957)
- Katzgraben (1957)
- Lotte In Weimar (1975)

== Death ==
Barbara Brecht-Schall died in Berlin on 31 August 2015, aged 84.
