= Mutter Courage und ihre Kinder (film) =

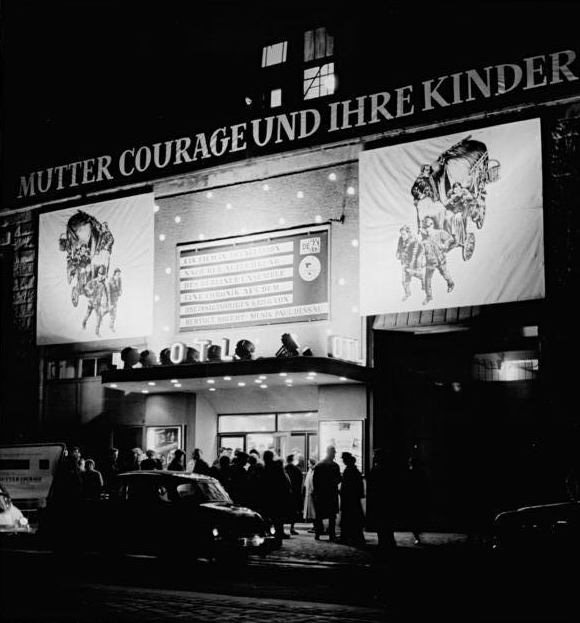
- Entrance of the theatre on the opening night, 10 February 1961
- Directed by: Peter Palitzsch; Manfred Wekwerth
- Based on: Mutter Courage und ihre Kinder by Bertolt Brecht
- Produced by: DEFA
- Starring: Helene Weigel
- Cinematography: Harry Bremer
- Edited by: Ella Ensink
- Music by: Paul Dessau
- Release date: 1961
- Running time: 151 minutes
- Country: German Democratic Republic
- Language: German

Mutter Courage und ihre Kinder (Mother Courage and Her Children) 1961 East German film produced by DEFA documenting the Berliner Ensemble staging of Bertolt Brecht's play of the same name. The play ran from 1959 to 1961, with Manfred Wekwerth and Peter Palitzsch directing, and stars Helene Weigel in the title role; it was modelled after the original 1949 production by Brecht and Erich Engel. The film received a prize at the Locarno Film Festival.

== History ==
Bertolt Brecht had directed his play Mutter Courage und ihre Kinder with the Berliner Ensemble, together with Erich Engel, in 1949. Manfred Wekwerth worked as his assistant for the production from 1951. After Brecht's death, the film Mutter Courage und ihre Kinder was intended to be a faithful rendering of this production on stage. It was shot in black and white in 1960 and 1961, with Wekwerth and Peter Palitzsch directing.

The film premiered on 10 February 1961 at the Berlin cinema Oranienburger Tor Lichtspiele, with the Minister of Culture Alexander Abusch in attendance. The film was shown simultaneously at 14 regional capitals of the GDR, marking the 63rd birthday of Brecht. The first screening in West Germany was in October 1962 at the Internationale Filmwoche Mannheim. It opened in other cinemas there on 12 March 1965, and was recommended in June 1965 by the Evangelische Filmgilde as best film of the month. The film was first aired by the Deutscher Fernsehfunk, the GDR television, on 27 March 1973.

== Reception ==
Henryk Keisch wrote in the daily paper Neues Deutschland that the film was a faithful reproduction of the staging which had already been performed 400 times at the theatre of the Berliner Ensemble. Helmut Ullrich of Die Neue Zeit noted that facial expressions were dominant compared with a stage production of the same actors.

== Cast ==
- Helene Weigel as Mutter Courage
- Ekkehard Schall as Eilif, her son
- Heinz Schubert as Schweizerkas, her younger son
- Angelika Hurwicz as Kattrin, her mute daughter
- Willi Schwabe as Recruiting officer
- Gerhard Bienert as Sergeant
- Ernst Busch as Cook
- Norbert Christian as Swedish Commander
- Wolf Kaiser as Chaplain
- Harry Gillmann as Zeugmeister
- Regine Lutz as Yvette Pottier
- Peter Kalisch as Einäugiger
- Erik S. Klein as Feldwebel
- Wolf von Beneckendorff as Obrist
- Ralf Bregazzi as Schreiber
- Wladimir Marfiak as Älterer Soldat
- Gerd E. Schäfer as Junger Soldat
- Axel Triebel as 1. Soldat
- Edgar Schrade as 2. Soldat
- Eva Brumby as Bäuerin
- Siegmund Linden as Bauer
- Bella Waldritter as Alte Frau
- Hans-Georg Simmgen as Junger Bauer
- Johannes Conrad as Diener der Yvette
- Wolfgang Lohse as 3. Soldat
- Stefan Lisewski as Fähnrich
- Hans W. Hamacher as 4. Soldat
- Horst Kube as 5. Soldat
- Carola Braunbock as Bäuerin
- Josef Kamper as Bauer
- Fritz Hollenbeck as Junger Bauer
- Hilmar Thate as Chronist

== Award ==
- 1961: Jugendliteraturdiplom at the Locarno Film Festival

== Literature ==
- F.-B. Habel: Das große Lexikon der DEFA-Spielfilme, Schwarzkopf & Schwarzkopf, Berlin 2000, ISBN 3-89602-349-7, pp. 424–425
