= Alexanderplatz demonstration =

Demonstration in East Germany

- Part of the Peaceful Revolution
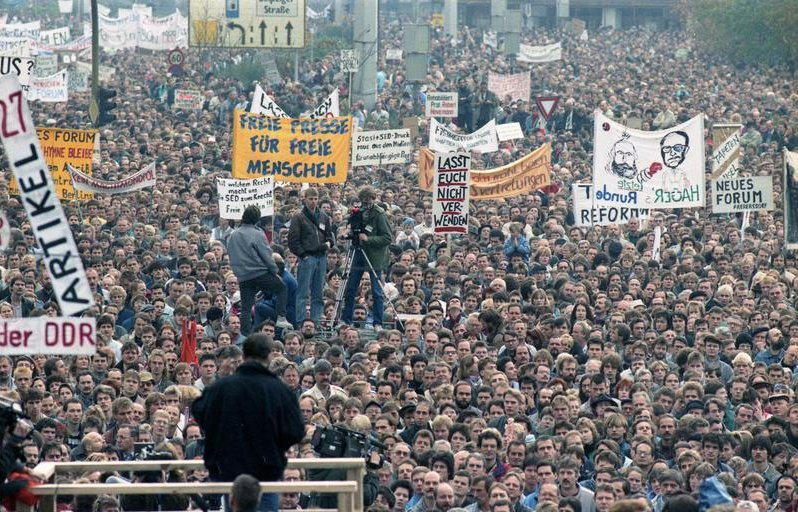
- The Alexanderplatz demonstration on 4 November 1989 in East Berlin
- Date: 4 November 1989; 37 years ago
- Location: Alexanderplatz, East Berlin, East Germany
- Caused by: Mikhail Gorbachev's abandonment of Soviet hegemony in Eastern Europe; Monday demonstrations; GDR's lack of competitiveness in the global market
- Result: Fall of the Berlin Wall; German reunification

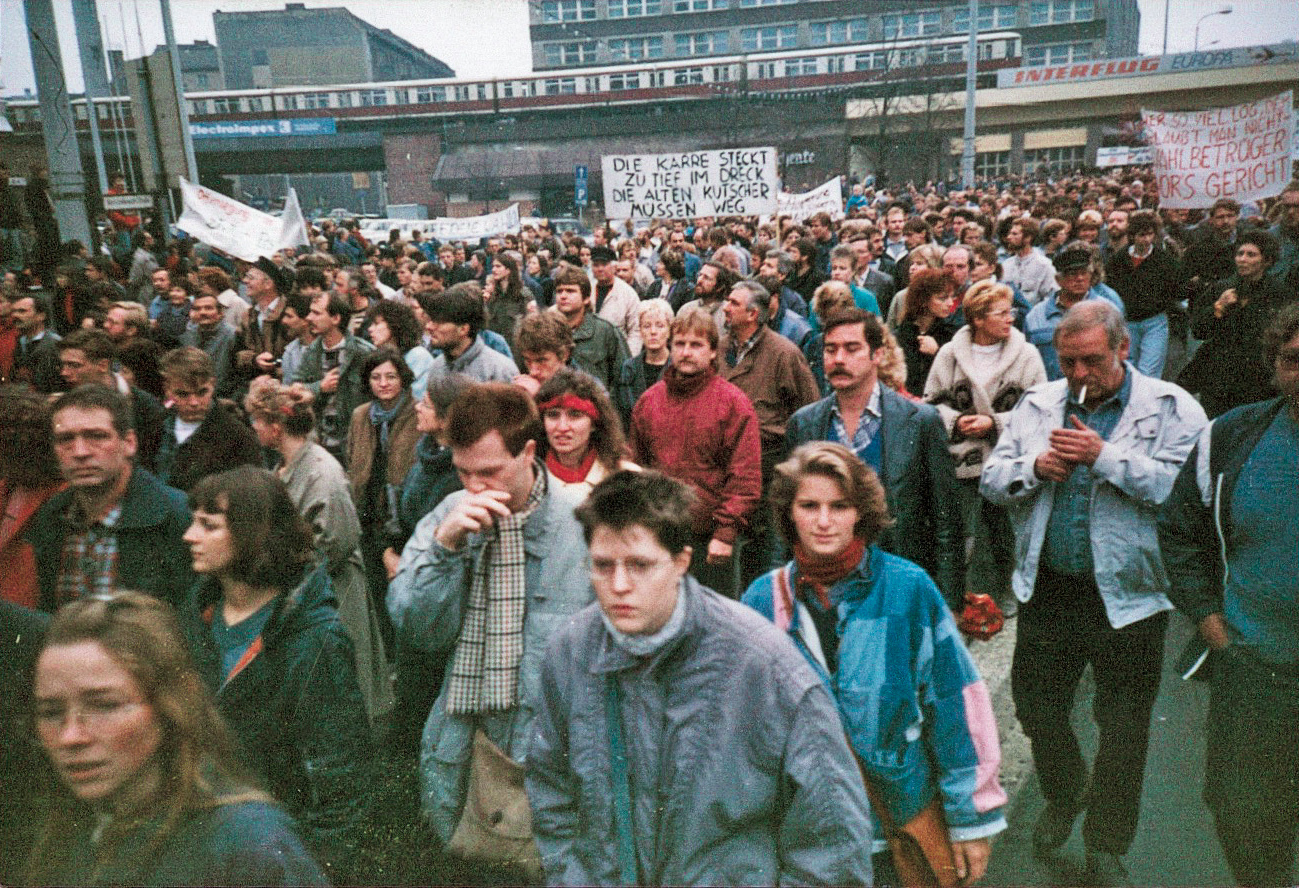
Beginning of the demonstration at Alexanderplatz

The Alexanderplatz demonstration (German: Alexanderplatz-Demonstration) was a demonstration for political reforms and against the government of the German Democratic Republic on Alexanderplatz in East Berlin on Saturday 4 November 1989. With between half a million and a million protesters it was one of the largest demonstrations in East German history^{[A]} and a milestone of the peaceful revolution that led to the fall of the Berlin Wall and German reunification. The demonstration was organized by actors and employees of theaters in East Berlin. It was the first demonstration in East German history that was organized by private individuals and was permitted to take place by the authorities. The speakers during the demonstration were members of the opposition, representatives of the regime and artists, and included the dissidents Marianne Birthler and Jens Reich, the writer Stefan Heym, the actor Ulrich Mühe, the former head of the East German foreign intelligence service Markus Wolf and Politburo member Günter Schabowski.

== Background and preparations ==
The original pamphlet distributed by the organizers^{[B]}

In early October 1989, East German authorities celebrated the 40th anniversary of the German Democratic Republic. At the same time, they had to face increasing protests across the country and a mass exodus of their citizens to West Germany via Hungary and the West German embassies in Prague and Warsaw. On 18 October, reformist members of the Politburo forced Erich Honecker to resign as the chair of the council of state and general secretary of the Socialist Unity Party (SED). He was replaced by the slightly less hardline Egon Krenz, who became the new party leader and the chair of the council of state a few days later. In his inaugural address, he used the term Die Wende (lit. turnaround) and promised political reforms. He later ordered the cessation of all police actions against protesters and reopened the previously closed border to Czechoslovakia. A few days later, on 23 October, more than 300,000 people joined the Monday demonstration in Leipzig, and many more at other protests throughout the country.

The Alexanderplatz demonstration was the first officially permitted demonstration in East Germany that was organized by individuals and not by the authorities. The first idea for a demonstration on the Alexanderplatz in the center of the capital of East Germany came from actors and employees of theaters in East Berlin, who had been struck by the assaults on peaceful protesters by the Volkspolizei and the Stasi during the celebrations of the 40th anniversary of East Germany on 7 October 1989. On 15 October 1989 at 11 am, an assembly of actors and employees of theaters in East Berlin met at the Deutsches Theater and decided to hold a demonstration for democratization and against the East German government. It was not the first meeting as on 7 October, the 40th anniversary of the German Democratic Republic, actors of the Volksbühne had invited their colleagues to discuss the political situation. The application for a permit to hold a demonstration was submitted two days later to the authorities by Wolfgang Holz of the Berliner Ensemble. The application was met with confusion by the SED and Stasi who could not decide whether to ban, allow or subvert the planned demonstration. After long deliberations the authorities decided on 26 October to permit the demonstration. A list of speakers was prepared by the organizers, including representatives of the regime, members of the opposition and artists. After having permitted the demonstration authorities tried to subvert the demonstration by spreading rumors – rumors such as that the Friedrichshain hospital was scheduling extra shifts for their doctors, that the German Reichsbahn was transporting agent provocateurs to Berlin or that the protesters were planning to march toward the Brandenburg Gate at the Berlin Wall. At the same time the organizers hired marshals who would wear a yellow sash with the words "No violence!".

== Demonstration ==
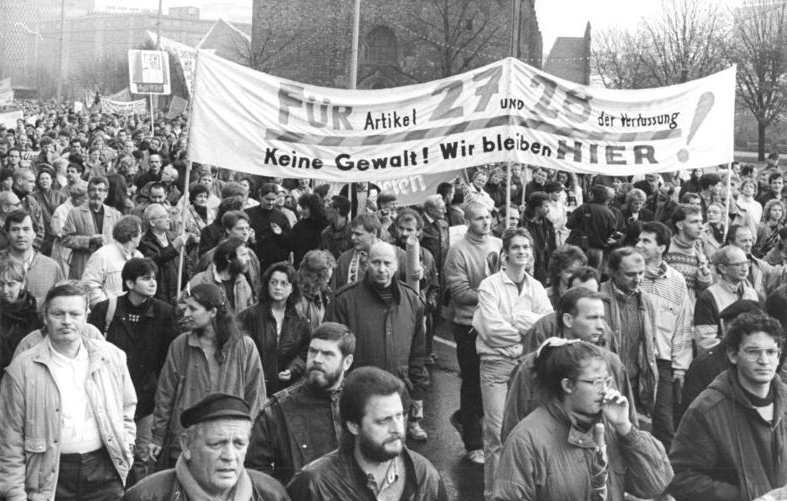
Protesters referring to paragraphs 27 and 28 of the East German constitution

On 4 November 1989 the demonstration started at 9:30 with a protest march to Alexanderplatz in the center of East Berlin. At 11:00 the first protesters arrived at the Alexanderplatz. The more than 500,000 protesters came not only from East Berlin but from all over East Germany. Thousands of banners showed the slogans that were already used by hundred of thousands of protesters in other East German cities during the still illegal Monday demonstrations. Neither the opening of the Berlin Wall nor a possible German reunification were among the demands. Instead the protesters concentrated on the democratization of East Germany, with references to paragraphs 27 and 28 of the East German constitution which in theory but not in practice guaranteed freedom of speech and freedom of assembly.

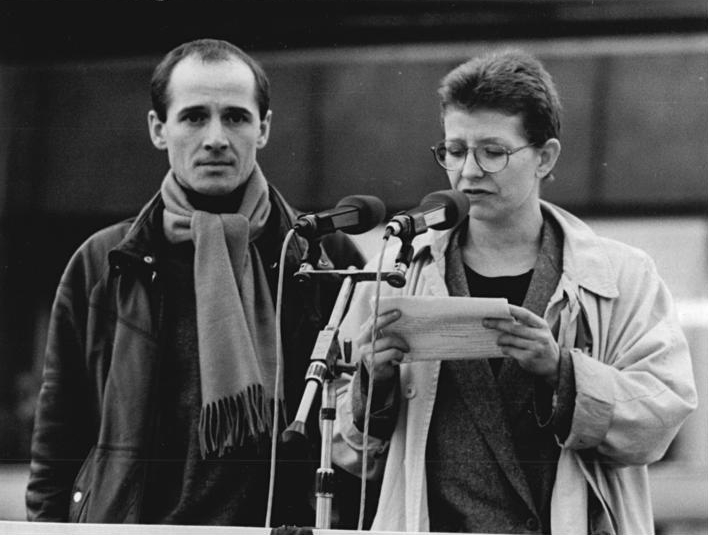
Stage actors Ulrich Mühe and Johanna Schall during the demonstration

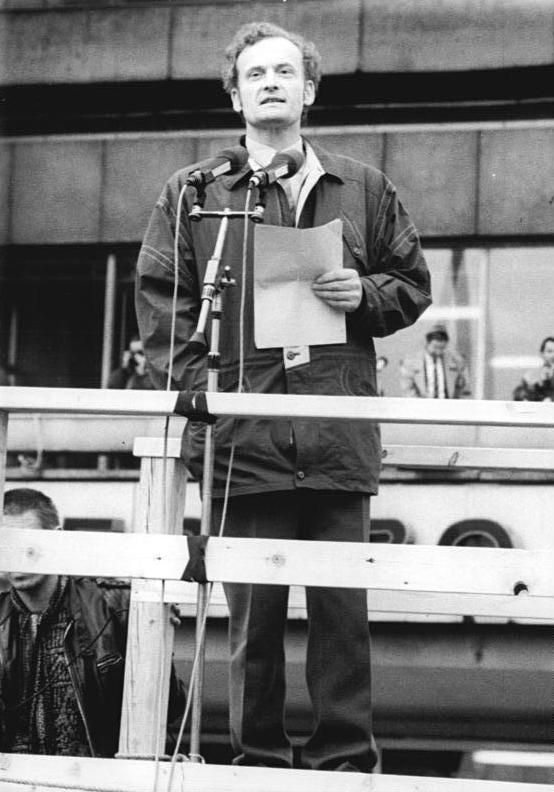
Friedrich Schorlemmer speaking

The opening speeches were given by Marion van de Kamp, Johanna Schall, Ulrich Mühe and Jan Josef Liefers, who were stage actors from East Berlin. Ulrich Mühe, actor at the Deutsches Theater demanded in his speech the abolition of the first paragraph of the East German constitution which guaranteed the leading role of the Socialist Unity Party. In the next three hours, a series of speakers voiced their demands for democratic reforms in East Germany. The three-hour-long demonstration was televised live on East German television, including the scenes of representatives of the regime being jeered and booed by the protesters. Later, the dissident Bärbel Bohley would say about Markus Wolf, former head of the East German foreign intelligence service and speaker during the demonstration:

When I saw that his hands were trembling because the people were booing I said to Jens Reich: We can go now, now it is all over. The revolution is irreversible."

The speakers were, in order of appearance: lawyer Gregor Gysi, Marianne Birthler of the opposition group Initiative for Peace and Human Rights, Markus Wolf, Jens Reich of the opposition group New Forum, LDPD politician Manfred Gerlach, actor Ekkehard Schall, SED Politburo member Günter Schabowski, writer Stefan Heym, theologian and dissident Friedrich Schorlemmer, writer Christa Wolf, actor Tobias Langhoff, film director Joachim Tschirner, dramatist Heiner Müller, university rector Lothar Bisky, university student Ronald Freytag, writer Christoph Hein, Hungarian student Robert Juhoras, and actress Steffie Spira.

== Banners ==
The most often and commonly used protest slogan of the Monday demonstrations as well as the Alexanderplatz demonstration was "We are the people" (German: Wir sind das Volk) which became "We are one people" (German: Wir sind ein Volk) after the fall of the Berlin Wall, thus changing the nature of the demonstrations. Many other slogans and banners have been documented by photographs and by an exhibition in the Deutsches Historisches Museum:

- "Change without ifs and buts" ("Wende ohne wenn und aber")
- "Civil rights not only on paper" ("Bürgerrechte nicht nur auf Papier")
- "Rehabilitate Robert Havemann" ("Rehabilitiert Robert Havemann")
- "Privileges for all" ("Privilegien für alle")
- "Socialism yes, Egon no" ("Sozialismus ja, Egon nein")
- "No lies – new people" ("Keine Lügen – neue Leute")
- "New thinking in old heads?" ("Neues Denken in alten Köpfen?")
- "Democracy for the SED" ("Demokratie für die SED")
- "No Nazi-methods in the penal system" ("Keine Nazimethoden im Strafvollzug")
- "Open house at Wandlitz" ("Tag der offenen Tür in Wandlitz")
- "Independent labor union!" ("Unabhängige Gewerkschaft!")
- "40 years are enough" ("40 Jahre sind genug")

== Commemorations ==
In early 1990 banners of the demonstration were used to decorate and cover the exhibits of the by then politically outdated permanent exhibition "Socialist mother country GDR" at the Deutsches Historisches Museum. In mid-1994 banners and other artifacts of the demonstration were permanently added to the collection of the museum and were shown in an exhibition on the Alexanderplatz demonstration. The banners were preserved by Henning Schaller, stage designer at the Maxim-Gorki-Theater, who asked participants to leave the banners so that they could be collected for an art exhibition. To mark the tenth anniversary in 1999 a series of events under the title "We were the people" (German: Wir waren das Volk) were held in Berlin.

== Notes ==
A: The number of participants differs across sources. Initially media reported numbers of around 500,000, as for example did The New York Times or numbers of one million as for example did Die Zeit. Later the organizers claimed one million participants, estimated from aerial photographs. Other sources such as the historian Karsten Timmer mention only half a million protesters. Irrespective of the exact number of protesters most sources agree that this was the largest demonstration in the history of East Germany, with some sources even claiming that it was the largest demonstration in German history. A contrary viewpoint is held by the historian Ilko-Sascha Kowalczuk, who estimates that at most 200,000 protesters participated. His estimate is based on four person per square meter and the fact that the Alexanderplatz has an area of 50,000m^{^2}, the limited capacity of public transport in East Berlin and the incentives of the organizers, the media and other groups to exaggerate the number of participants to increase the pressure on the ruling party.

B: The pamphlet reads: "Information by the association of theater workers. Demonstration against violence and for constitutionally guaranteed rights (Demonstration is officially registered) Time: 4 November 1989 10:00 am. Meeting point: ADN-building (Mollstrasse/Prenzlauer Allee) Banners are welcome."
