= Johanna Schall =

German actress

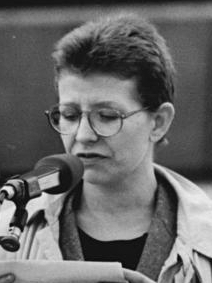
- Johanna Schall at the Alexanderplatz demonstration on 4 November 1989 protesting the SED Communists' monopoly on power in East Germany
- Born: 19 September 1958 (age 67); East Berlin, East Germany
- Occupation: Actress
- Years active: 1976–2003

Johanna Schall (born 19 September 1958) is a German actress. She appeared in 23 films and television shows between 1976 and 2003. She starred in Apple Trees, which was screened in the Un Certain Regard section at the 1992 Cannes Film Festival. She is the daughter of actors Ekkehard Schall and Barbara Brecht-Schall, and the granddaughter of Bertolt Brecht and Helene Weigel.

She has worked as a theater director since 1993. From 2002 to 2007, she headed the drama department of the Volkstheater Rostock, after which she spent a year as a visiting lecturer at the University of Toronto. Since then, she has worked freelance as a director.

== Selected filmography ==
- The House on the River (1986)
- Apple Trees (1992)
