= Gisela May =

German actress and singer (1924–2016)

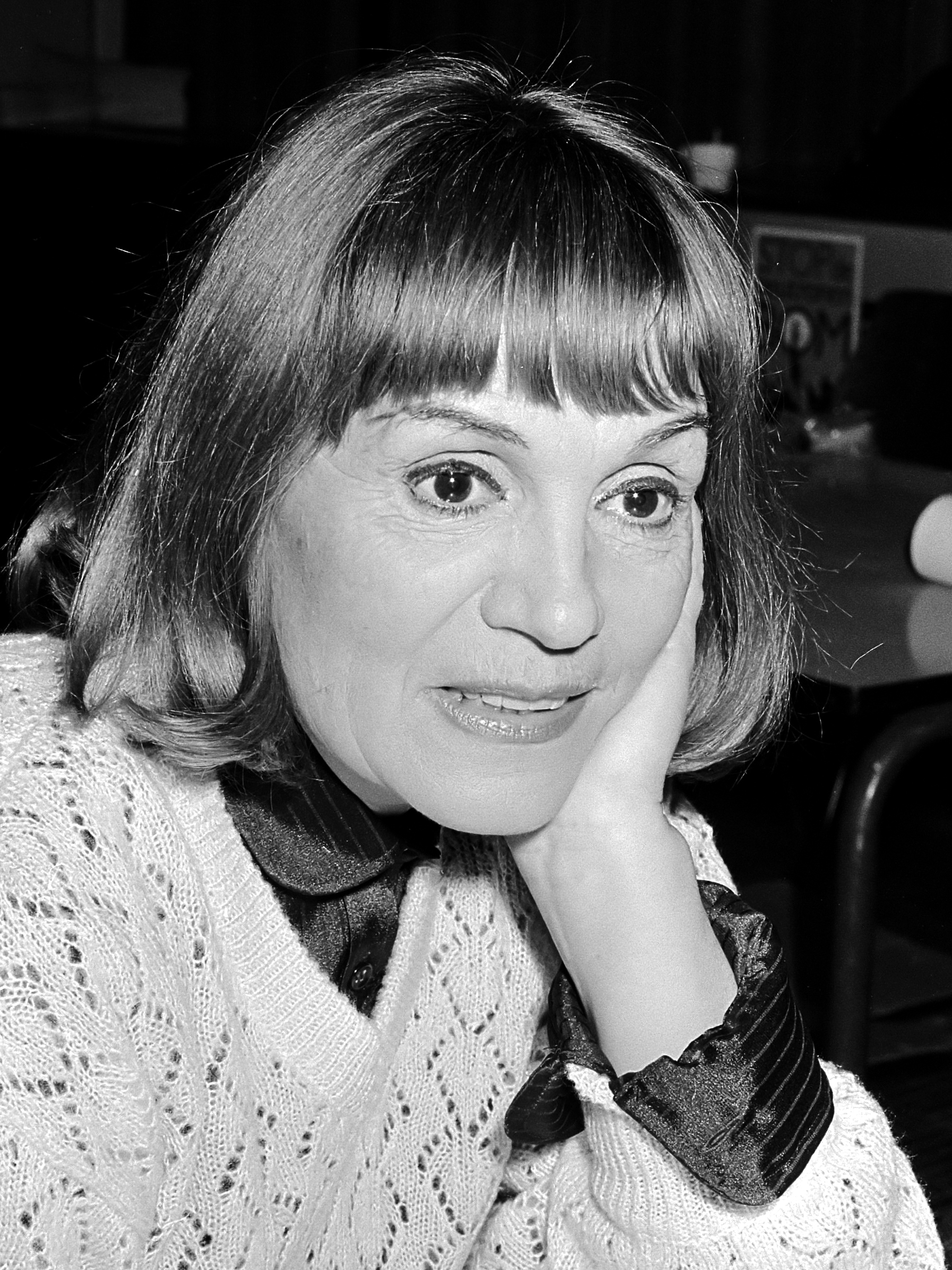
- May in 1979
- Born: 31 May 1924; Wetzlar, Rhine Province, Germany
- Died: 2 December 2016 (aged 92); Berlin, Germany
- Education: Academy of Arts, Berlin
- Occupations: Actress, singer
- Years active: 1951–2007
- Awards: Order of Merit of the Federal Republic of Germany (2004)

Signature
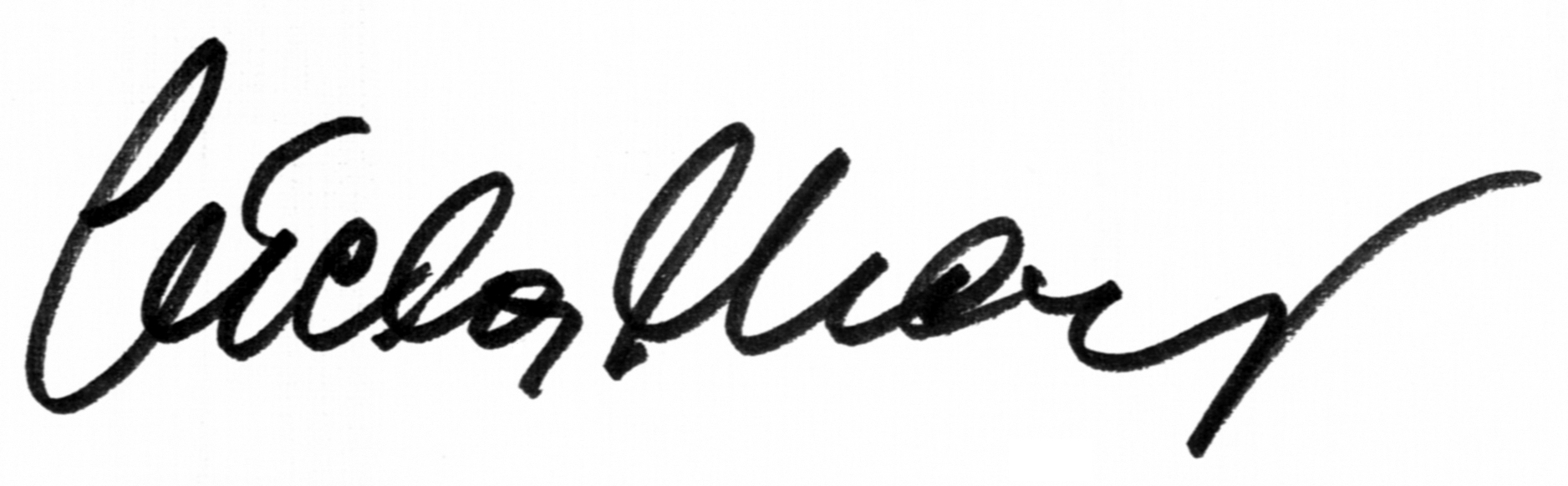

Gisela May (31 May 1924 – 2 December 2016) was a German actress and singer.

== Early life ==
May was born in Wetzlar, Germany. Both her mother, Kate May, and her father, Ferdinand May, were writers. She studied at the drama school in Leipzig from 1942 to 1944. She was employed for nine years at various theatres, including the State Theatre of Schwerin and the State Theatre in Halle. Starting in 1951, she performed at the Deutsches Theater in Berlin, where she played a variety of roles.

== Career ==
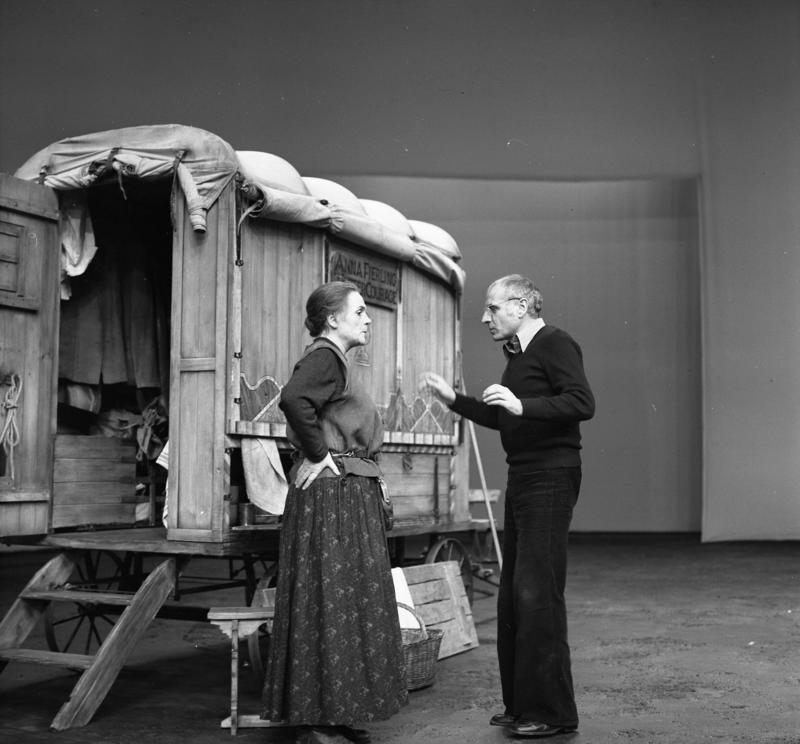
Manfred Wekwerth and Gisela May during rehearsals of Mother Courage and Her Children (1978)

In 1962, May moved to Bertolt Brecht's theatre group, the Berliner Ensemble, and stayed for 30 years. While there she played a variety of roles, including Madame Cabet in The Days of the Commune, Mrs Peachum in The Threepenny Opera, Mrs Kopecka in Schweik in the Second World War, and Mother Courage in Mother Courage and Her Children.

From 1963 she was a member of the presidium of the German-Italian Society of the GDR under the president Professor Gerhard Reintanz, from 1972 a member of the Academy of Arts (East) and from 1993 of the new Academy of Arts (Berlin).

May was known as a diverse performer. In the 1970s she performed the lead role in the musical Hello, Dolly! in Berlin, and later she starred in the television series Adelheid and her Murderers. She also performed solo concerto concerts internationally, including at New York's Carnegie Hall, Milan's La Scala and the Sydney Opera House.

From 1983 to 1989 she hosted her own entertainment show "Pfundgrube" on GDR television. From 1992, she freelanced, often working at Berlin's Renaissance Theatre.

== Awards ==
- 1959: Art Prize of the German Democratic Republic
- 1960: Distinguished Service Medal of the National People's Army in Silber for Schritt für Schritt
- 1962 Clara-Zetkin-Medaille
- 1963 National Prize of the German Democratic Republic for Art and Literature, III Class
- 1991 Deutscher Filmpreis (German Film Award) Film Award in Gold for outstanding individual achievement: Category actress for: Die Hallo-Sisters (1990)
- 2004 Bundesverdienstkreuz (Order of Merit of the Federal Republic of Germany)
