= Jens Reich =

German scientist (born 1939)

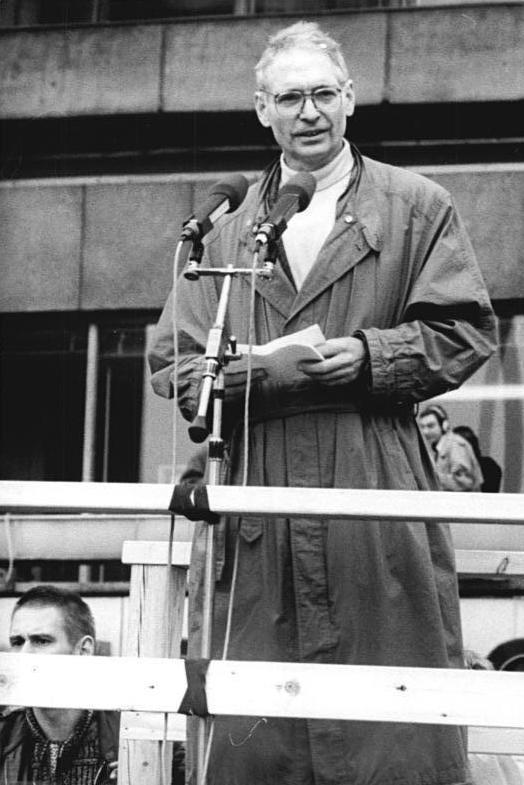
- Born: Jens Georg Reich; 26 March 1939 (age 87); Göttingen, Province of Hanover, Nazi Germany
- Education: Humboldt University of Berlin
- Known for: The kinetic behaviour of metabolic pathways, foundation of the New Forum
- Children: Stephanie Reich
- Awards: Carl Friedrich von Weizsäcker Prize, Order of Merit of the Federal Republic of Germany
- Scientific career
- Fields: Biochemistry
- Institutions: Central Institute for Molecular Biology, Berlin-Buch; German Cancer Research Center, Heidelberg; Max Delbrück Center for Molecular Medicine, Berlin
- Thesis: 1. Arterial Vascular Sounds; 2. Time and Motion in the Metabolism of Living Cells

Jens Georg Reich (born 26 March 1939 in Göttingen, Province of Hanover) is a German scientist and a member of the German Ethics Council. He became famous as a civil rights campaigner in the last decade of the German Democratic Republic (GDR)

== Life and work ==
Jens Reich grew up in Halberstadt. He studied medicine and molecular biology at East Berlin's Humboldt University and began his professional career as a junior doctor in his hometown. After further study in biochemistry, he turned to research work. In 1964, Jens Reich obtained his doctorate with the dissertation Arterial Vascular Sounds and from 1968 onwards worked at the Central Institute of Molecular Biology of the Academy of Sciences in Berlin-Buch. In 1976 he completed the dissertation Time and Motion in the Metabolism of Living Cells for his second doctorate. In collaboration with Evgeni Selkov he was one of the first to study the kinetic behaviour of metabolic pathways (as opposed to single enzymes).

As early as 1970 he co-founded a private "Friday Circle", a group of about 30 opposition-minded citizens who met to discuss the GDR. In the 1980s the Ministry for State Security spied on the group and kept records of their meetings. Soon after his appointment to head of department at the Central Institute for Molecular Biology, Jens Reich lost this post. He was further sanctioned for his oppositional attitude with a ban on travel to Western countries.

Despite his political difficulties Reich continued with his scientific research during the 1970s and 1980s, with several notable papers, such as a strategy for parameter estimation in enzymology and a study of inorganic pyrophosphatase in collaboration with Samuel Rapoport, the most influential figure in biochemistry in the GDR at that time. During that period he published his study with Selkov of time-dependent properties in metabolic systems.

In September 1989 Jens Reich was one of the authors and signatories of the appeal "Aufbruch 89 – Neues Forum " ( "Fresh Start 89 – New Forum"), leading to the founding of the New Forum. On 4 November 1989, Jens Reich, along with Friedrich Schorlemmer, Christa Wolf, Ulrich Mühe and other well-known figures in the GDR, was one of the speakers at the Alexanderplatz demonstration in East Berlin, the largest demonstration of that period.

His daughter is the physics professor Stephanie Reich.

== Works ==
- 2005 Reich, Jens Teufelsfragen. Ethische Konflikte in der Biomedizin. 2-CD-Set. supposé, Köln
- 2003 Reich, Jens Es wird ein Mensch gemacht. Möglichkeiten und Grenzen der Gentechnik, Rowohlt Berlin
- 1992 Reich J. G., Abschied von den Lebenslügen, Rowohlt-Verlag, Berlin
- 1991 Reich J. G., Rückkehr nach Europa, Carl-Hanser-Verlag, München-Wien
- 1981 Reich J. G., Sel’kov E. E., Energy Metabolism of the Cell, A Theoretical Treatise, Academic Press, London & New York
