= Elisa Molinari =

Italian physicist

- Born: Modena, Italy
- Scientific career
- Fields: Condensed Matter Physics
- Workplaces: University of Modena and Reggio Emilia (Department of Physics, Informatics and Mathematics), Nanoscience Institute of the National Research Council

Elisa Molinari is an Italian physicist from the University of Modena and a member of CNR, Italy. She has been primarily interested in computational materials science and nanotechnologies, and she has been particularly active in the theory of fundamental properties of low-dimensional structures, in the simulation of nanodevices, and in the development of related computational methods. She also has a continuing interest in scientific imaging and communication.

== Biography ==
Elisa Molinari is Full Professor of Condensed Matter Physics at the University of Modena and Reggio Emilia, Italy, in the Department of Physics, Informatics and Mathematics, a position she has held since 2001. Molinari has over thirty years of experience in the simulation of materials and nanosystems, as well as their spectroscopies. Her research interests lie in computational materials science and nanotechnologies.

Since 2015, she has served as Director of MaX – Materials design at the exascale, the European Centre of Excellence for materials simulation at the exascale using high-performance computing. Previously, she held research positions at CNR in Rome, at the Max Planck Institute for Solid State Research in Stuttgart, and in Grenoble.

Molinari has coordinated European and national projects involving fundamental properties and correlation in low-dimensional materials, and joint computational and experimental approaches to nano(bio)systems.

She has long been active in initiatives dedicated to promoting women in science: she cofounded the "Associazione donne e scienza" in Italy, as well as the IUPAP Working Group on Women in Physics in 1999 and the related International Conference series.

== Honours ==
Molinari was awarded the status of Fellow in the American Physical Society, after she was nominated by a Forum on International Physics in 1999, for "her contribution to the theory of semiconductors and their interfaces, in particular, her fundamental work on electron-electron and electron-phonon interaction in nanostructures; and for her involvement in the training of young theorists from many countries and the organization of international conferences."

== Selected publications ==
Molinari has published more than 280 scientific publications in leading international journals.

- MAH Bertran et al., "Understanding the irreversible lithium loss in silicon anodes using multi-edge X-ray scattering analysis", arXiv e-prints, arXiv: 2410.05794 (2024)
- Sun et al, "Evidence for equilibrium exciton condensation in monolayer WTe2", Nature Physics 18, 94 (2022).
- Ataei et al, "Evidence of ideal excitonic insulator in bulk MoS2 under pressure", Proc Natl Acad Sci USA, 118, e2010110118 (2021).
- D. Varsano et al, "A monolayer transition-metal dichalcogenide as a topological excitonic insulator", Nature Nanotechnology 15, 367 (2020)
- P. D'Amico et al, "Intrinsic edge excitons in two-dimensional MoS2", Phys. Rev. B 101, 161410 (2020)
- M.O. Atambo et al, "Electronic and optical properties of doped TiO2 by many-body perturbation theory", Phys. Rev. Materials 3, 045401 (2019)
- A. Portone et al, "Tailoring optical properties and stimulated emission in nanostructured polythiophene", Scientific Reports 9, 7370 (2019)
- J.O. Island et al, "Interaction-Driven Giant Orbital Magnetic Moments in Carbon Nanotubes", Phys. Rev. Letters 121, 127704 (2018)
- D. Varsano et al, "Carbon nanotubes as excitonic insulators", Nature Comm. 8, 1461 (2017)
- A. De Sio et al, "Tracking the coherent generation of polaron pairs in conjugated polymers", Nature Comm. 7, 13742 (2016)
- L. Bursi et al, "Quantifying the Plasmonic Character of Optical Excitations in Nanostructures", ACS Photonics 3, 520 (2016)
- G. Soavi et al "Exciton-exciton annihilation and biexciton stimulated emission in graphene nanoribbons", Nature Comm.7, 11010 (2016)
- S. Falke et al, "Coherent ultrafast charge transfer in an organic photovoltaic blend", Science 344, 1001 (2014)
- R. Denk et al, "Exciton Dominated Optical Response of Ultra-Narrow Graphene Nanoribbons", Nature Comm 5, 4253 (2014)
- C. A. Rozzi et al, "Quantum coherence controls the charge separation in a prototypical artificial light-harvesting system", Nature Comm 4, 1602 (2013)
- P. Ruffieux et al, "Electronic Structure of Atomically Precise Graphene Nanoribbons", ACS Nano 6, 6930 (2012)
- S. Kalliakos et al, "A molecular state of correlated electrons in a quantum dot", Nature Physics 4, 467 - 471 (2008)
- D. Prezzi et al, "Optical properties of graphene nanoribbons: The role of many-body effects", Phys Rev B77, 041404 (2008)
- A. Ferretti et al, "Mixing of electronic states in pentacene adsorption on copper", Phys Rev Lett 99, 046802 (2007)
- J. Maultzsch et al, "Exciton binding energies in carbon nanotubes from two-photon photoluminescence", Phys Rev B 72, 241402 (2005)
- A. Ferretti et al, "First-principles theory of correlated transport through nanojunctions", Phys Rev Lett 94, 116802 (2005)

== See also ==
- List of fellows of the American Physical Society (1998–2010)
