= The Resistible Rise of Arturo Ui =

1941 play by Bertolt Brecht

- Original language: German
- Written by: Bertolt Brecht
- Subject: Adolf Hitler's rise to power
- Genre: Allegory, satire
- Setting: Chicago, 1930s

Premiere
- Date: Stuttgart, West Germany, 10 November 1958

The Resistible Rise of Arturo Ui (German: Der aufhaltsame Aufstieg des Arturo Ui), subtitled "A parable play", is a 1941 play by the German playwright Bertolt Brecht. It chronicles the rise of Arturo Ui, a fictional 1930s Chicago mobster, and his attempts to control the cauliflower racket by ruthlessly disposing of the competition. The play is a satirical allegory of the rise of Adolf Hitler and the Nazi Party in Germany prior to World War II.

== History and description ==
Fearing persecution and blacklisted from publication and production, Brecht – who in his poetry referred to Adolf Hitler as der Anstreicher ("the housepainter") – left Germany in February 1933, shortly after the appointment of Hitler as Chancellor by President Paul von Hindenburg on the instigation of former Chancellor Franz von Papen. After moving around – Prague, Zürich, Paris – Brecht ended up in Denmark for six years. While there, c. 1934, he worked on the antecedent to The Resistible Rise of Arturo Ui, a satire on Hitler called Ui, written in the style of a Renaissance historian. The result was a story about "Giacomo Ui", a machine politician in Padua, a work which Brecht never completed. It was later published with his collected short stories.

Brecht left Denmark in 1939, moving first to Stockholm, and then, the next year, to Helsinki, Finland. He wrote the current play there in only three weeks in 1941, during the time he was waiting for a visa to enter the United States. The play was not produced on the stage until 1958, and not until 1961 in English. In spite of this, Brecht did not originally envision a version of the play in Germany, intending it all along for the American stage.

The play is consciously a highly satirical allegory of Hitler's rise to power in Germany and the advent of the National Socialist state. All the characters and groups in the play had direct counterparts in real life, with Ui representing Hitler, his henchman Ernesto Roma representing Ernst Röhm, the head of the Nazi brownshirts; Dogsborough representing General von Hindenburg, a hero of World War I and the President of the Weimar Republic (his name is a pun on the German Hund and Burg); Emanuele Giri representing Hermann Göring, a World War I flying ace who was Hitler's second in command; Giuseppe Givola representing the master propagandist Joseph Goebbels; the Cauliflower Trust representing the Prussian Junkers; the fate of the town of Cicero standing for the Anschluss, when Austria was annexed by Nazi Germany; and so on. In addition, every scene in the play is based, albeit sometimes very loosely, on a real event, for example the warehouse fire which represents the Reichstag fire, and the Dock Aid Scandal which represents the Osthilfeskandal (Eastern Aid) scandal. The play is similar in some respects to the film The Great Dictator (1940), which also featured an absurd parody of Hitler ("Adenoid Hynkel") by Charlie Chaplin, Brecht's favorite film actor.

Dramatically Arturo Ui is in keeping with Brecht's "epic" style of theatre. It opens with a prologue in the form of a direct address to the audience by an otherwise unidentified "Actor", who outlines all the major characters and explains the basis of the upcoming plot. This allows the audience to better focus on the message rather being concerned about what might happen next in the plot.

Brecht describes in the play's stage directions the use of signs or projections, which are seen first on the stage curtain, and later appear after certain scenes, presenting the audience with relevant information about Hitler's rise to power, in order to clarify the parallels between the play and actual events.

The play has frequent references to Shakespeare. To highlight Ui's evil and villainous rise to power, he is explicitly compared to Shakespeare's Richard III. Like Macbeth, Ui experiences a visitation from the ghost of one of his victims. Finally, Hitler's practiced prowess at public speaking is referenced when Ui receives lessons from an actor in walking, sitting and orating, which includes his reciting Mark Antony's famous speech from Julius Caesar.

== Characters and settings ==
- Dogsborough → Paul von Hindenburg
- Arturo Ui → Adolf Hitler
- Giri → Hermann Göring
- Roma → Ernst Röhm
- Givola → Joseph Goebbels
- Dullfeet → Engelbert Dollfuß (assassinated Chancellor of Austria)
- Caulifower Trust → Prussian Junkers (subsidized German landowners)
- Clark (of the Trust) → Franz von Papen
- Vegetable dealers → Petty bourgeoisie
- Gangsters → Fascists
- Fish → Marinus van der Lubbe (the Dutch Communist convicted of burning down the Reichstag)

Equivalents for places and things cited in the text are:

- Chicago → Germany
- Cicero → Austria
- Dock Aid scandal → Eastern Aid scandal
- the Warehouse → the Reichstag

== Alternative titles ==
There are fewer alternative copies of the script than is usual with Brecht's works, since "most of the revisions, such as they were, [had] been made directly on the first typescript", but he did refer to the play by a number of alternative names, among them The Rise of Arturo Ui, The Gangster Play We Know and That Well-Known Racket. At one point he referred to it as Arturo Ui, labelled it a "Dramatic Poem" and ascribed authorship to K. Keuner ("Mr. Nobody").

== Production history ==
The Resistible Rise of Arturo Ui was intended by Brecht to be first performed in the United States, but he was unable to get a production mounted. Brecht brought the play to the attention of director Erwin Piscator in New York, suggesting Oskar Homolka to play Ui. Piscator and Brecht's frequent musical collaborator, Hanns Eisler, got H. R. Hay to translate the work, which was completed by September 1941, and submitted to Louis Shaffer, the director of Labor Stage, who turned it down as "not advisable to produce", presumably because the United States was still, at the time, a neutral country.

The play lingered in the drawer until 1953, after Brecht had founded the Berliner Ensemble in East Germany, and had produced there his major works. He showed the play around to a larger circle of people than had seen it previously, and this eventually led to the Berliner Ensemble's production – except that Brecht insisted that scenes from his Fear and Misery of the Third Reich, a series of realistic short pieces about life in Nazi Germany that was written around 1935 – needed to be produced first. His fear was that the German audience was still too close to their previous psychic connection to Hitler.

When Brecht died in 1956, the Berliner Ensemble still had not produced Fear and Misery in the Third Reich – which at various times was also called 99% and The Private Life of the Master Race – but Brecht had prepared it for publication, which came out in 1957. That same year, scenes from the work were staged by five young directors of the Ensemble. One of them, Peter Palitzsch, directed the world premiere of The Resistible Rise of Arturo Ui in Stuttgart, West Germany, in 1958. The Ensemble itself first produced the play four months later, with Palitzsch and Manfred Wekwerth co-directing, and Ekkehard Schall as Arturo Ui. This production, "staged in fairground style, with ruthless verve and brassy vulgarity" was presented also in Berlin, London and at the Paris International Theatre Festival. A later production by the Berliner Ensemble, directed by Heiner Müller has run in repertory since June 1995, with Martin Wuttke in the title role.

The Resistible Rise of Arturo Ui was presented twice on Broadway. The first production, billed Arturo Ui, was in 1963, with Christopher Plummer in the lead role and Madeleine Sherwood. Michael Constantine, Elisha Cook, Lionel Stander, Sandy Baron, Oliver Clark and James Coco in the cast. It was directed by Tony Richardson and ran for five previews and eight performances. The second Broadway production of the play took place in 1968–69 by the Guthrie Theater Company. It starred Robin Gammell as Ui, and was directed by Edward Payson Call. It ran for ten performances.

The play has been presented three times Off-Broadway. In 1991 it was produced by the Classic Stage Company, with John Turturro as Arturo Ui, directed by Carey Perloff.

In 2002, it played at the National Actors Theatre, with Ui played by Al Pacino, co-starring Steve Buscemi as Givola, Billy Crudup as Flake, Charles Durning as Dogsborough, Paul Giamatti as Dullfeet, John Goodman as Giri, Chazz Palminteri as Roma, Lothaire Bluteau as Fish, Jacqueline McKenzie as Dockdaisy, Linda Emond as Betty Dullfeet, and Tony Randall (who also produced) as the actor, with an ensemble that included Sterling K. Brown, Ajay Naidu, Dominic Chianese, Robert Stanton, John Ventimiglia, and William Sadler. It was directed by Simon McBurney. The Classic Stage Company tackled it again in 2018, directed by John Doyle with Raúl Esparza in the title role and Eddie Cooper and Elizabeth A. Davis in the supporting cast. In 1986, the play was produced in Canada at the Stratford Festival, running for 46 performances with Maurice Godin in the lead role.

In 2017, Bruce Norris' adapted version of the play was performed at the Donmar Warehouse in London, with Lenny Henry starring as Arturo Ui, and directed by Simon Evans.

The role of Ui has been played by such other notable actors as Peter Falk, Griff Rhys Jones, Leonard Rossiter, Antony Sher, Nicol Williamson, Henry Goodman Hugo Weaving, and Jean Vilar. Simon Callow discussed his interpretation of the role in his autobiography, Being an Actor, while Plummer explains why he felt he failed in the role on Broadway in his autobiography, In Spite of Me.

A production by the Sydney Old Tote Theatre Company was filmed for Australian television in 1972 with John Bell in the title role and Helen Morse as Dockdaisy.

In April 2026, the Royal Shakespeare Company opened a new version by Stephen Sharkey and directed by Seán Linnen at the Swan Theatre, Stratford-upon-Avon starring Mark Gatiss in the title role alongside Mawaan Rizwan, Kadiff Kirwan, Janie Dee and Christopher Godwin.

== Critical response ==
At the time of the first stage production, in Stuttgart, Siegfried Melchinger, a West German critic, called it a "brilliant miscarriage", and complained that the play omitted the German people, echoing the complaint of the East German critic Lothar Kusche, who had read the play in manuscript. Brecht's answer was, in part

Ui is a parable play, written with the aim of destroying the dangerous respect commonly felt for great killers. The circle described has been deliberately restricted; it is confined to the plane of state, industrialists, Junkers and petty bourgeois. This is enough to achieve the desired objective. The play does not pretend to give a complete account of the historical situation in the 1930s.

In his 1992 study, Hitler: The Führer and the People, J. P. Stern, a professor of German literature, rejects both Arturo Ui and Chaplin's The Great Dictator, writing: "[T]he true nature of [Hitler] is trivialized and obscured rather than illuminated by the antics of Charles Chaplin and the deeply unfunny comedy of Bertolt Brecht."

The play was listed in 1999 as No. 54 on Le Monde's 100 Books of the Century.

== In popular culture ==
Lines from the play are quoted at the end of Cross of Iron, a 1977 drama war film directed by Sam Peckinpah: "Do not rejoice in his defeat, you men. For though the world has stood up and stopped the bastard, the bitch that bore him is in heat again".

In the final episode of the first season of Being Human, the vampire Herrick quotes the play shortly before the werewolf George kills him: "The world was almost won by such an ape! The nations put him where his kind belong. But don't rejoice too soon at your escape – The womb he crawled from is still going strong." This mocks the heroes' hopes of stopping his plans for world domination and asserts that the villains' rise to power is inevitable.
