= The Trial of Joan of Arc at Rouen, 1431 =

- Original language: German
- Written by: Bertolt Brecht
- Subject: Joan of Arc
- Genre: Non-Aristotelian / Epic

Premiere
- Date: November 1952
- Place: Berliner Ensemble, East Germany

The Trial of Joan of Arc at Rouen, 1431 is an adaptation by the German dramatist Bertolt Brecht of a radio play by Anna Seghers. It was written in collaboration with Benno Besson and premiered at the Berliner Ensemble in November 1952, in a production directed by Besson (his first important production with the Ensemble), with Käthe Reichel as Joan.

== Characters ==
- Joan of Arc
- Bishop Cauchon of Beauvais
- Jean Beaupère
- Jean de la Fontaine
- Jean de Chatillon (Chation)
- Guillaume Manchon
- Jean d'Estivet
- Jean Lefèvre
- Jean Massieu
- Raoul de Rinel
- A Clerk
- The Executioner
- Nuns
- An English Observer
- His Adjutant
- Guards of Joan of Arc
- English Soldiers
- Two Peasant Girls
- Jacques Legrain
- Peasant
- Peasant Woman
- Son
- Sister-in-law
- Child
- Fishwife
- Dr. Dufour
- His Two Nieces
- Well-dressed Gentleman
- Loose Woman
- Wine Merchant
- Innkeeper
- Young Curate
- War Cripple
- Grandfather Breuil
- His Grandson
- Children
- People

== Sources ==
- Willett, John. 1959. The Theatre of Bertolt Brecht: A Study from Eight Aspects. London: Methuen. ISBN 0-413-34360-X.
- Willett, John, and Ralph Manheim, eds. 1972. Collected Plays: Nine. By Bertolt Brecht. Bertolt Brecht: Plays, Poetry, Prose Ser. New York: Vintage. ISBN 0-394-71819-4.
