= Marion van de Kamp =

German actress and TV announcer (1925–2022)

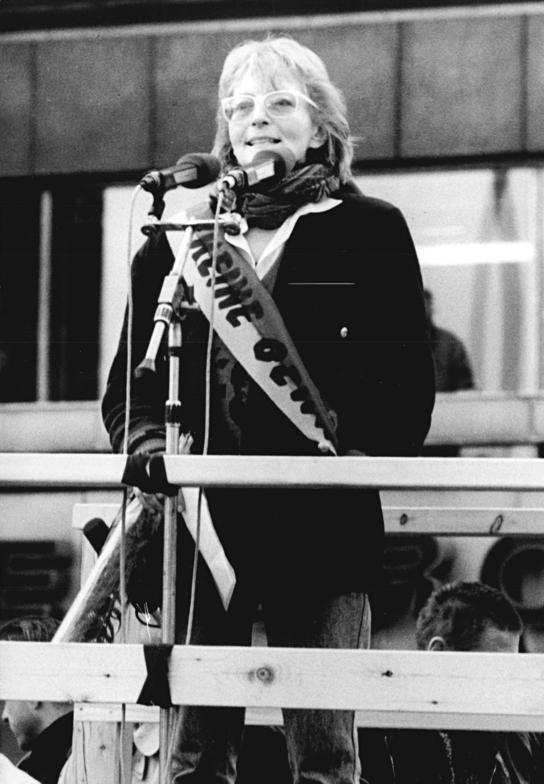
van de Kamp speaking at the Alexanderplatz demonstration in 1989.

Marion van de Kamp (23 October 1925 – 28 May 2022) was a German actress and television announcer.

Born in Wuppertal in 1925 to Dutch parents, she attended a drama school in Dresden, East Germany and worked at theatres in Meiningen, Görlitz, Plauen, Schwerin and Leipzig. In 1953 she started working for the Deutscher Fernsehfunk, the public East German television.

Van de Kamp died on 28 May 2022, at the age of 96.
