= Apple Trees (film) =

1992 film

- Directed by: Helma Sanders-Brahms
- Written by: Helma Sanders-Brahms
- Produced by: Alfred Hürmer
- Starring: Johanna Schall
- Cinematography: Jürgen Lenz
- Edited by: Monika Schindler
- Release date: 9 July 1992
- Running time: 112 minutes
- Country: Germany
- Language: German

Apple Trees (German: Apfelbäume) is a 1992 German drama film directed by Helma Sanders-Brahms. It was screened in the Un Certain Regard section at the 1992 Cannes Film Festival.

== Cast ==
- Johanna Schall as Lena
- Thomas Büchel as Heinz
- Udo Kroschwald as Sienks
- Steffie Spira as Großmutter
- Andrea Meissner as Sienkes Frau
- Roland Kuchenbuch as Stasimann
- Harald Engelmann as Stasimann
- Peter Pauli as Parteisekretär
- Dieter Schindelhauer as Parteifunktionär (as Dieter Schindelbauer)
- Cathlen Gawlich as Susi
- Anne K. Rathsfeld as Helga
- Nana Wolfing as Ingrid
- Marcel Struwe as Markus
