= Die Mutter (film) =

1958 East German film

- Directed by: Manfred Wekwerth; Bertolt Brecht
- Written by: Maxim Gorky
- Release date: 1958
- Country: East Germany
- Language: German

Die Mutter is an East German film. It was released in 1958. It is an adaptation of the 1932 play by Bertolt Brecht, which in itself is based on the 1906 novel by Maxim Gorky.
