= Castles and Cottages =

1957 film

Schlösser und Katen
- Directed by: Kurt Maetzig
- Written by: Kurt Barthel
- Produced by: Hans Mahlich
- Starring: Raimund Schelcher
- Cinematography: Otto Merz
- Edited by: Ruth Moegelin
- Music by: Wilhelm Neef
- Production company: DEFA
- Distributed by: Progress Film
- Release date: 8 February 1957 (both parts)
- Running time: 203 minutes (combined); Part 1: 102 minutes; Part 2: 101 minutes
- Country: East Germany
- Language: German

Schlösser und Katen (Castles And Cottages) is an East German black-and-white film, directed by Kurt Maetzig. It was released in 1957.

== Plot ==
=== Part 1: Hunchback Anton ===
In a feudal estate in Mecklenburg, the hunchback coachman Anton Zuckman married maid Marthe, who was pregnant with Baron von Holzendorf's illegitimate child, in exchange for a letter promising that the baron would recognize his offspring when it would wed and endow it with 5000 Mark. Marthe gave birth to a daughter, Anna, nicknamed Annegret.

In 1945, the baron and his family fled to the West, leaving their serfs and servants under Soviet occupation. The former estate inspector, Bröker, plans to have Anna marry his son, after discovering the baron's letter. Anna, now a young woman, falls in love with Klimm, a war veteran who returned from captivity. When she realizes her father's plans, she and Klimm flee to the city.

=== Part 2: Annegret's Return ===
The new communist government handed the nobles' lands to the common people, and Anton became a small farmer. He and his wife make a modest living on their plot of land. Annegret, now a zoologist, returns to the countryside to implement reforms in livestock management that would improve productivity, as the government intends to collectivize the farms. The farmers, especially the richer ones, are skeptical. Anton is frustrated by one of the communist functionaries' constant demands, assaults him and is thrown in jail. The people become tired of the collectivization efforts. The Baroness von Holzendorf returns from the west, and begins to stir trouble. On 17 June 1953, the farmers revolt against the government, as part of a wave of statewide demonstrations. Soviet troops quell the uprising. Anton, who understands the letter he received is worthless, turns to aid the local officials. After a life of misery, he is accepted as an equal member in the new collective farm. Marthe, Anton, Annegret and Klimm reunite as a happy family.

== Cast ==
- Raimund Schelcher - Krummer Anton
- Erika Dunkelmann - Marthe
- Karla Runkehl - Annegret
- Erwin Geschonneck - Bröker
- Ekkehard Schall as Ekkehart Bröker
- Ulrich Thein as agronom
- Harry Hindemith as Kalle
- Wilhelm Puchert as Jens Voß
- Angelika Hurwicz - Hede
- Dieter Perlwitz as Heinz Klimm
- Helga Göring - Christel Sikora
- Hans Finohr as Friedrich Sikura
- Lotte Loebinger as Mrs. Sikura
- Kurt Dunkelmann as Wittig
- Horst Kube as drunkard

== Production ==
According to director Kurt Maetzig, the idea to make the film came to him during the brief period of liberalization that took place in East Germany after Nikita Khrushchev's Secret Speech. He claimed that the film's realistic style was also influenced by his wish to correct the impression of the highly propagandistic Ernst Thälmann pictures.

The script's approval by the DEFA Commission was delayed by the outbreak of the Hungarian Revolt at October 1956. As the Soviets put their forces in East Germany on alert, fearing a repetition of the 1953 events, the scene in which Soviet tanks dispersed the rebelling villagers had to be reconsidered. The script was authorized at late November, after the situation in Hungary was stabilized.

Principal photography commenced in the end of 1956. The main obstacle that faced Maetzig was the alcoholism of actor Raimund Schelcher, who was constantly drunk on set and often failed to show up for filming. Eventually, the director was forced to have him replaced for two weeks by actor Hans Hardt-Hardtloff. This was partially remedied in the editing stage.

== Reception ==
Castles and Cottages was viewed by more than three million people, although failing to secure any awards.

Joshua Feinstein asserted that while the film still featured subversive agents from the West and other typical communist themes, it had a historical and psychological depth rare to East German pictures. He also claimed that Anton's deformity represented "an inner self-debasement, worse than any external oppression can cause." Heiko R. Blum considered Castles and Cottages as Maetzig's best film, and one of the best ever made in East Germany.

Andrea Brockmann wrote that Castles and Cottages was one of the few East German pictures which made a reference to the 17 June 1953 uprising, portraying it as a complex event rather than a counterrevolutionary putsch. Maetzig himself told interviewer Martin Brady that the interpretation of the June events was his own, and different from the view held by the governments of both German states; he stressed that he depicted the uprising neither as a purely popular act of resistance to the communists, nor as a consequence of Western subversion, but rather as resulting from the combination of external influence across the border and frustration with the rashness of the government's reforms.

Author Johannes von Moltke noted that the film used the motifs of the classical German "homeland" films, but instead of directly manipulating them for propaganda purposes as done in The Condemned Village, Maetzig's work was a more honest attempt, and only diverged slightly in what Mettke called "the prototype of Heimat in Socialism." He also pointed out another dualism characterizing the plot: while the re-distribution of the count's land to the serfs was portrayed as far from an unmitigated success, and the hardships facing the serfs-turned-farmers were emphasized, this was done not only for realism's sake, but also to demonstrate the necessity of a further change - the nationalization of all the plots to create the collective farms. Still, the farmers were presented as unwilling to agree to the latter move, fearing to lose their personal property; this, too, was a relatively realistic approach by the filmmaker. Helmut Pflügl and Raimund Fritz wrote that it was one of "surprisingly few" East German films to deal with the problems that arose due to the nationalization and later collectivization of the former feudal estates.

Critics Antonin and Miera Liehm regarded the film as "poor propaganda". The West German Catholic Film Service cited Castles and Cottages as "a film which, in spite of the good performance of the actors, was not thoroughly well made on the plot level... although it had many depictions of authentic human behavior."
