= Katzgraben =

1957 film

- Directed by: Manfred Wekwerth, Bertolt Brecht
- Written by: Erwin Strittmatter
- Release date: 1957
- Country: East Germany
- Language: German

Katzgraben is an East German film. It was released in 1957.
