= Stephanie Reich =

German physicist

- Education: Technische Universität Berlin (MS, PhD)
- Scientific career
- Workplaces: Free University of Berlin
- Thesis: Carbon nanotubes: vibrational and electronic properties (2001)

Stephanie Reich is a German physicist and Professor at the Free University of Berlin. Her research considers the physics of nanostructures, which she studies using experimental characterisation techniques and computational simulations.

== Early life and education ==
Reich attended Technische Universität Berlin where she studied physics. She earned her undergraduate and master's diplomas in 1998, before embarking on a doctoral programme. After a year as a research assistant, Reich moved to the Institut de Ciència de Materials de Barcelona. In 2002 she was made a Fellow of the Berlin-Brandenburg Academy of Sciences and Humanities.

== Research and career ==
In 2003 Reich moved to the University of Cambridge as an Oppenheimer Research Fellow. Whilst at Cambridge she held a joint position at Newnham College, Cambridge. She started to work on the characterisation of graphene, In 2007 Reich was appointed Professor of the Physics of Nanostructures at the Free University of Berlin. When she arrived at the Free University of Berlin she was awarded a European Research Council (ERC) starting grant, which was later upgraded to a Consolidator Grant. Reich focusses on one dimensional nanostructures, including graphene, semiconductor nanowires and carbon nanotubes.

== Awards and honours ==
- 2007 European Research Council Starting Grant
- 2012 Dahlem Research School Award for Excellent Supervision
- 2015 Elected to AcademiaNet
- 2017 European Research Council Consolidator Grant

== Select publications ==
- Thomsen, C.; Reich, S.; Maultzsch, J. (2004-01-28). Carbon Nanotubes. Wiley. doi:10.1002/9783527618040. ISBN 978-3-527-40386-8.
- Thomsen, C.; Reich, S. (2000-12-11). "Double Resonant Raman Scattering in Graphite". Physical Review Letters. 85 (24): 5214–5217. Bibcode:2000PhRvL..85.5214T. doi:10.1103/PhysRevLett.85.5214. PMID 11102224.
- Reich, S.; Maultzsch, J.; Thomsen, C.; Ordejón, P. (2002-07-19). "Tight-binding description of graphene". Physical Review B. 66 (3) 035412. Bibcode:2002PhRvB..66c5412R. doi:10.1103/PhysRevB.66.035412.
