= Stefan Brecht =

American poet, critic and scholar (1924-2009)

Stefan Sebastian Brecht (November 3, 1924 – April 13, 2009) was a German-born American poet, critic, and scholar of theatre.

== Early life and education ==
Brecht was born in Berlin to playwright and poet Bertolt Brecht and actress Helene Weigel.

On September 26, 1944, he joined the United States Army. In 1947, when his family returned to Europe, Brecht chose to stay in the United States. He studied at UCLA (BS in chemistry) and Harvard on the G.I. Bill and received a Ph.D. in philosophy at Harvard.

== Career ==
Brecht taught philosophy at the University of Miami. He pursued further study of Georg Wilhelm Friedrich Hegel and Karl Marx at the École pratique des hautes études in Paris. He had a son, Michael Böhm, who was born in Germany in 1954.

After moving to New York City in about 1966 with his wife, costume designer Mary McDonough Brecht (now deceased) and their two children, who were born in Paris in the early 1960s, Brecht became immersed in the radical theatre, which was just beginning at the time and started writing what he projected would be a series of seven books, The Original Theatre of the City of New York: From the Mid-Sixties to the Mid-Seventies. Descriptions of performances by Jack Smith and Charles Ludlam's Ridiculous Theatrical Company, and others formed the core of Queer Theatre, which was published by Suhrkamp Verlag in 1978. He performed with Ludlam and also with Robert Wilson in the 1960s and 1970s; The Theatre of Visions: Robert Wilson was published in 1978 by Suhrkamp and was translated into German in an abridged version in 2006. Peter Schumann's Bread and Puppet Theatre (Methuen, 1988) includes the early history of the theatre and describes in detail many performances and street parades of the 1960s and 1970s, with comments on Schumann's masks. A fourth book in this series, on the origins and early work of Richard Foreman's Ontological-Hysteric Theater, was being prepared for publication in 2010.

A collection of poems, self-published in 1976, was picked up by Lawrence Ferlinghetti's City Lights and appeared in their City Lights Pocket Poets Series in 1977 as Stefan Brecht: Poems. A small collection of poems in the German language, Gedichte, was published by Aufbau-Verlag in 1984.

Brecht was the U.S. administrator of his father's estate. At the time of his death he was married to Rena Gill, a longtime friend whose Victoria Falls clothing store was a 1970s landmark in the SoHo neighborhood of New York City.

== Selected publications ==
- The Theatre of Visions: Robert Wilson (1972)
- Stefan Brecht: Poems (1978)
- Queer Theatre (1982)
- Bread and Puppet Theatre (1987)
- 8th Avenue (2006) (Poems)
- Bedlam Days: The Early Plays of Charles Ludlam and The Ridiculous Theatrical Company (2019)
