= Ekkehard Schall =

German actor and director (1930-2005)

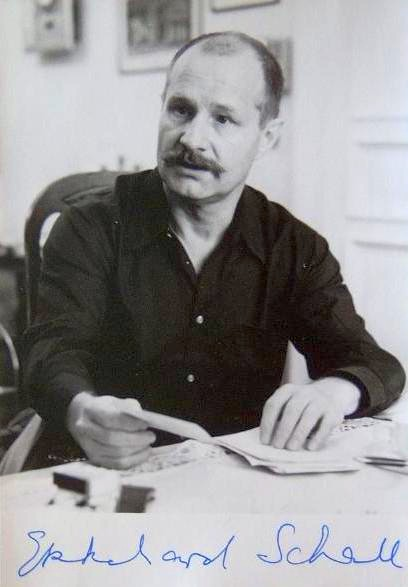
Ekkehard Schall's autograph, 1989.

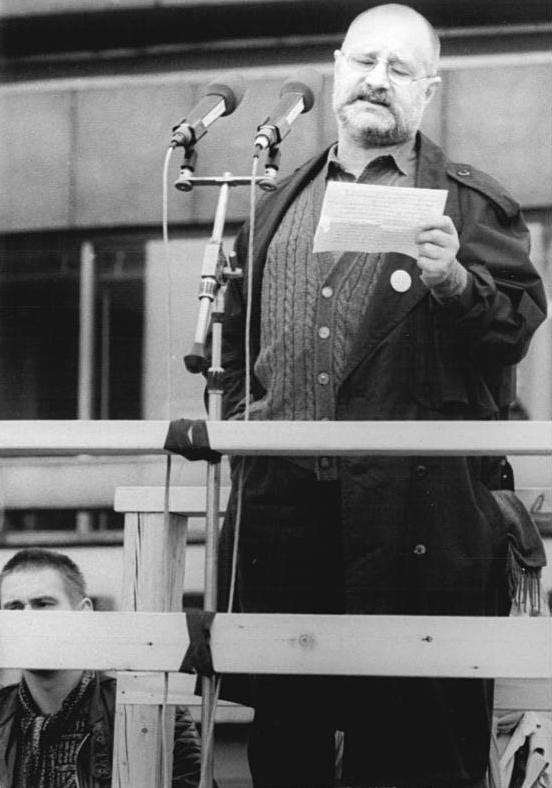
Ekkehard Schall (November 1989)

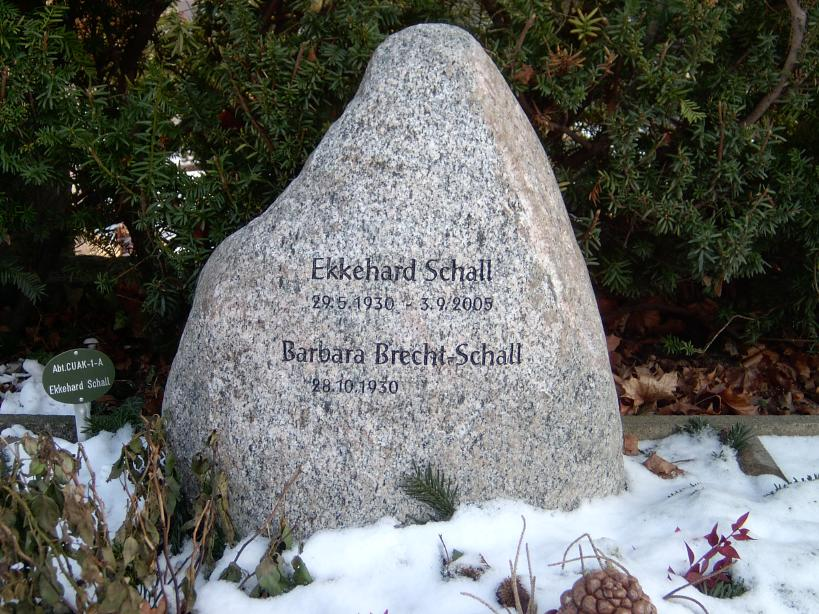
Headstone on Schall's grave at Dorotheenstädtischer Friedhof in Berlin.

Ekkehard Schall (29 May 1930 in Magdeburg – 3 September 2005 in Berlin) was a German stage and screen actor/director.

He was one of the best-known interpreters of Brecht's works and together with Helene Weigel a member of the Berliner Ensemble.

== Life ==
Schall first went on stage in 1947 in Magdeburg. After engagements in Frankfurt (Oder) (Stadttheater Frankfurt (Oder)) and on the Neuen Bühne in Berlin, Bertolt Brecht hired him in 1952 as part of the Berliner Ensemble. Schall played here till 1995, for 14 years as intendant.

He played more than 60 roles, for example, Ui in Brecht's Der aufhaltsame Aufstieg des Arturo Ui more than 500 times.

Schall was honored in 1959 with the Kunstpreis der DDR, in 1962 and 1979 with the Nationalpreis der DDR.

He was married to Brecht's daughter Barbara Brecht-Schall and is the father of actress Johanna Schall.

== Selected roles ==
- Ui in Der aufhaltsame Aufstieg des Arturo Ui (Brecht)
- Galilei in Leben des Galilei (Brecht)
- Coriolan (Shakespeare)
- Azdak in Der kaukasische Kreidekreis (Brecht)
- Galloudec in Der Auftrag von Heiner Müller

== Filmography ==
- Die unwürdige Greisin (1985)
- Wagner (1983)
- Die Rache des Kapitäns Mitchell (1979)
- Coriolan (1978)
- Der Kaukasische Kreidezirkel (1976)
- Im Staub der Sterne (1976)
- Aus unserer Zeit (1970)
- Ich - Axel Cäsar Springer (1970)
- Meine besten Freunde (1966)
- Wolf unter Wölfen (1965)
- I Sequestrati di Altona (1962)
- Der Traum des Hauptmann Loy (1961)
- Mutter Courage und ihre Kinder (1961)
- Les Arrivistes (1960)
- The Punch Bowl (1959)
- Geschichte vom armen Hassan (1958)
- Das Lied der Matrosen (1958)
- Berlin – Ecke Schönhauser… (1957)
- Schlösser und Katen (1957)
- Mutter Courage und ihre Kinder (1955)
- Die Gewehre der Frau Carrar (1953)

== Works ==
- 2001 Meine Schule des Theaters. Seminare, Vorlesungen, Demonstrationen, Diskursionen. Suhrkamp, ISBN 3-518-13413-2
- 2002 Buckower Barometer. Gedichte. Frankfurt Insel, ISBN 3-458-17102-9
