= Janina Maultzsch =

German physicist

- Education: Technische Universität Berlin
- Scientific career
- Workplaces: University of Erlangen–Nuremberg; Technische Universität Berlin; Columbia University
- Thesis: Vibrational properties of carbon nanotubes and graphite (2004)

Janina Maultzsch is a German physicist who is the Chair of Experimental Physics at Friedrich-Alexander-Universität Erlangen-Nürnberg. Her research considers the electronic and optical properties of carbon nanomaterials.

== Early life and education ==
Maultzsch was an undergraduate student at Technische Universität Berlin, where she studied physics. She remained in Berlin for doctoral research, investigating the vibrational properties of carbon allotropes including nanotubes and graphite.

== Research and career ==
Maultzsch moved to the University of Siegen, where she worked on near field microscopy. She returned to Technische Universität Berlin in late 2004, where she worked as a researcher in the Institute of Solid State Physics. She moved to Columbia University in 2006, working as a postdoctoral researcher with Tony Heinz. She returned Technische Universität Berlin in 2008, where she was made an assistant professor. She is interested in low-dimensional materials, including transition-metal dichalcogenides and graphene.

Maultzsch contributed to the understanding of carbon nanotubes. In particular, she investigated their electronic and vibrational properties. She made use of resonant Raman spectroscopy to uncover the optical transition energies and radial mode frequencies of various metallic and semiconducting nanotubes. She showed that the optical transition energies and electronic structures depend on the chirality index of the nanotube. She revealed that electron-phonon coupling increases for smaller chiral angles.

In 2010, Maultzsch was awarded an ERC Starting Grant focused on the characterisation of carbon nanomaterials. In 2015, she was promoted to full Professor for Novel Materials. In 2017, Maultzsch was appointed the Chair of Experimental Physics at the University of Erlangen–Nuremberg.

== Selected publications ==
- Reich, Stephanie; Maultzsch, Janina (2004). Carbon nanotubes: basic concepts and physical properties. C. Thomsen, J. Maultzsch. Weinheim: Wiley-VCH. ISBN 3-527-40386-8. OCLC 50434660.
- S. Reich; J. Maultzsch; C. Thomsen; P. Ordejón (19 July 2002). "Tight-binding description of graphene". Physical Review B. 66 (3). Bibcode:2002PhRvB..66c5412R. doi:10.1103/physrevb.66.035412. ISSN 0163-1829. Wikidata Q57654930.
- Elena Stolyarova; Kwang Taeg Rim; Sunmin Ryu; et al. (29 May 2007). "High-resolution scanning tunneling microscopy imaging of mesoscopic graphene sheets on an insulating surface". Proceedings of the National Academy of Sciences of the United States of America. 104 (22): 9209–12. arXiv:0705.0833. Bibcode:2007PNAS..104.9209S. doi:10.1073/pnas.0703337104. ISSN 0027-8424. PMC 1874226. PMID 17517635. Wikidata Q24683090.
- Janina Maultzsch; Stephanie Reich; Thomsen C; Requardt H; Pablo Ordejón (17 February 2004). "Phonon dispersion in graphite". Physical Review Letters. 92 (7) 075501. Bibcode:2004PhRvL..92g5501M. doi:10.1103/physrevlett.92.075501. ISSN 0031-9007. PMID 14995866. Wikidata Q57654905.
