= Angelika Hurwicz =

German actress and theatre director

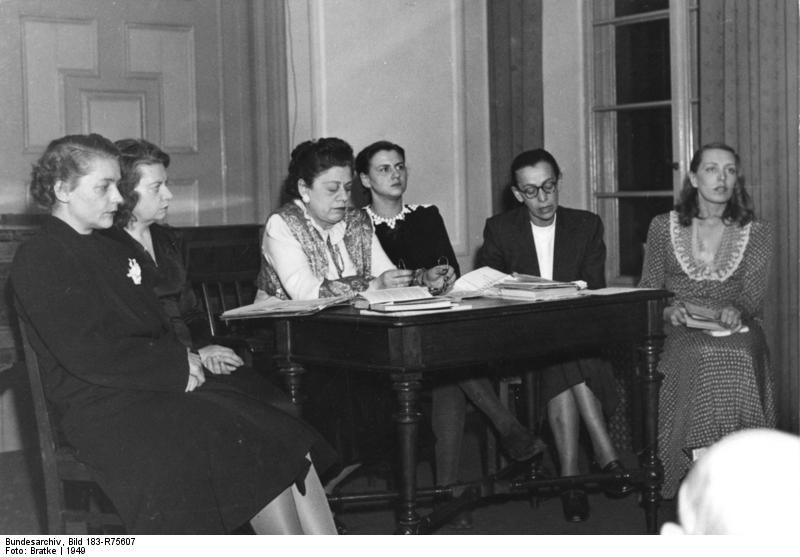
From left to right: Inge von Wangenheim, Mary Schneider-Braillard, Annemarie Hasse, Angelika Hurwicz, Helene Weigel und Else Reuss in 1949.

Angelika Hurwicz (22 April 1922, Berlin – 26 November 1999, Bergen) was a German actress and theatre director. She worked with Bertolt Brecht at his Berliner Ensemble company until 1958, when she moved to West Germany. Hurwicz was the first female director at the Burgtheater in 1978.

== Biography ==
Harwich was the daughter of writer Elias Hurwicz and was of Jewish descent, which made her unable to attend drama school under the Nuremberg Laws. Instead, she trained privately with state actress Lucie Höflich.

Hurwicz acted in a number of Brecht's plays, including the career-transforming Mother Courage and Her Children, in which she had the role of Kattrin. The success of the play paved the way for the establishment of the Berliner Ensemble.

At the time, Hurwicz's casting in lead role was remarked on by theatre critics such as Kenneth Tynan because of her physical appearance that, on the London stage, would have relegated her to comedic relief. In his review of The Caucasian Chalk Circle, Tynan wrote that, "Angelika Hurwicz is a lumpy girl with a face as round as an apple: our theatre would cast her, if at all, as a fat comic maid. Brecht makes her the heroine."

Hurwicz was a lesbian and lived with her long-term partner, the photographer Gerda Goedhart; at one point, she commented on Brecht's inability to deal openly with homosexuality. Hurwicz and Goedhart wrote a book together about the intricacies of producing Brecht's work in 1964.
