= Manfred Wekwerth =

German theatre and film director (1929–2014)

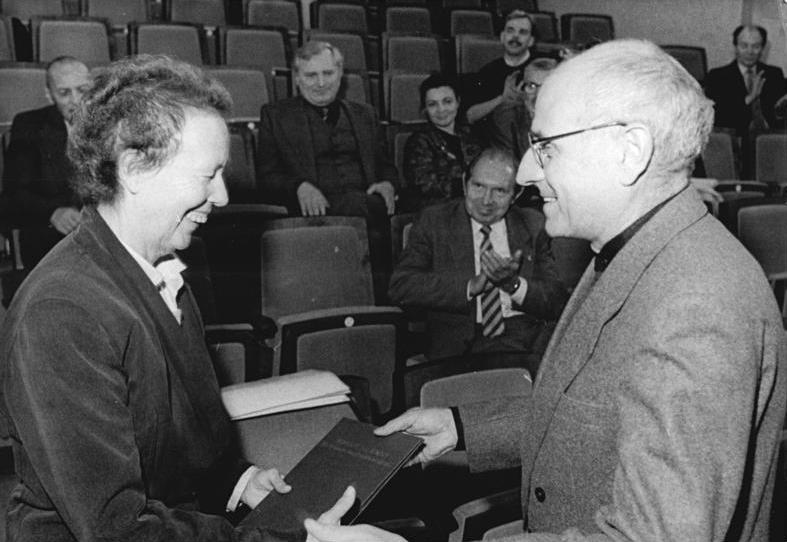
- Ruth Berghaus and Wekwerth, 1988
- Born: Manfred Weckwerth; 3 December 1929; Köthen, Free State of Anhalt, Weimar Republic
- Died: 16 July 2014 (aged 84); Berlin, Germany
- Occupations: Theatre director; film director; writer

Manfred Wekwerth (né Weckwerth; 3 December 1929 – 16 July 2014) was a German theatre and film director and writer. He was the director of the Berliner Ensemble theatre from 1977 to 1991. He was also an informant for East Germany's Stasi from 1965 until the German reunification.

Wekwerth was born in Köthen, Saxony-Anhalt. He was married to Renate Richter until his death. They had one child.

Wekwerth died on 16 July 2014 in Berlin, aged 84.

== Selected filmography ==
- Katzgraben (1957)
- Die Mutter (1958)
- Mutter Courage und ihre Kinder (1961)

== Other websites ==
- Manfred Wekwerth at IMDb
