= Berliner Ensemble =

German theatre company

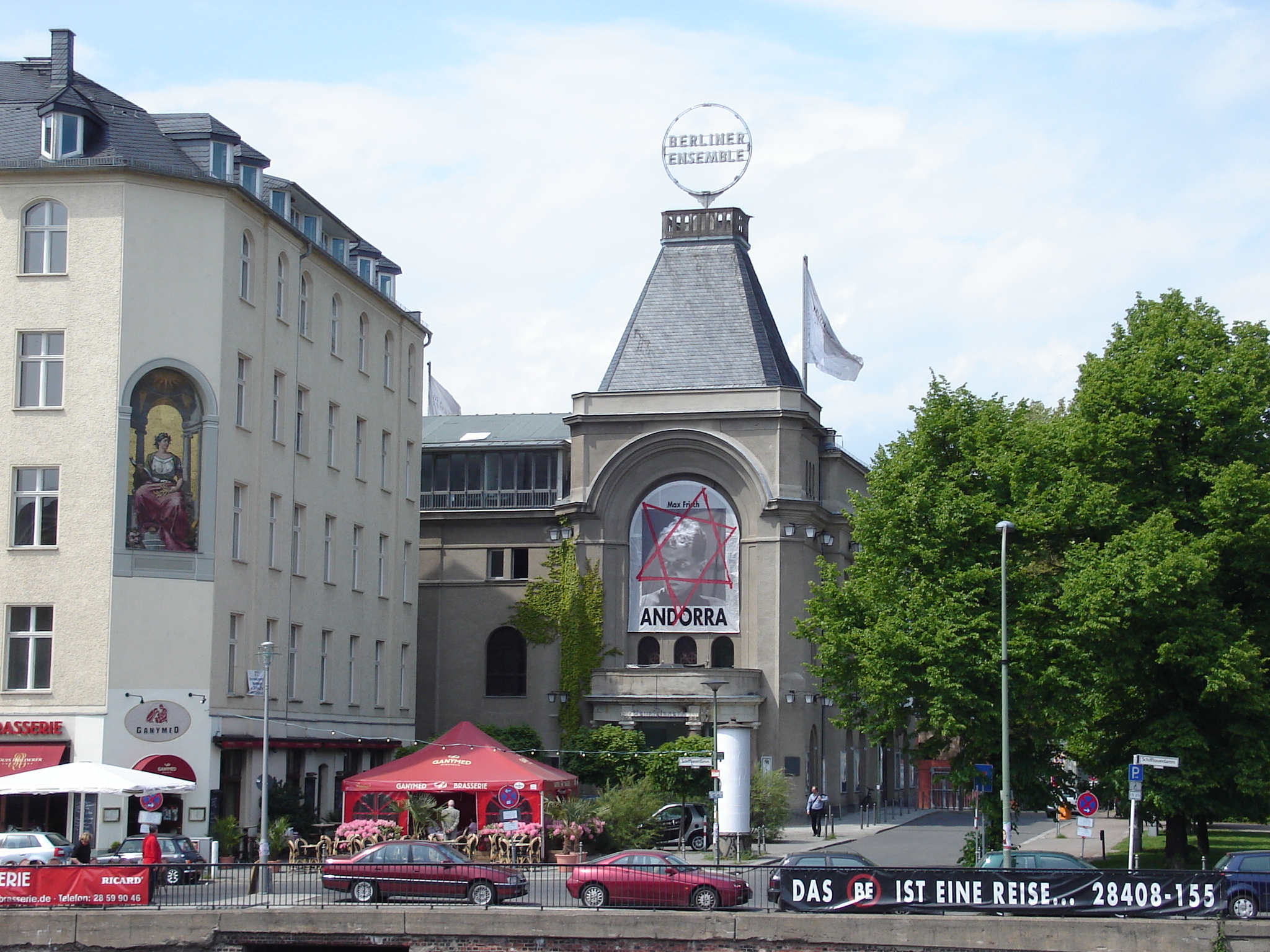
- Theater am Schiffbauerdamm, home of the Berliner Ensemble
- Formation: January 1949; 77 years ago
- Type: Theatre group
- Location: Berlin, Germany
- Website: berliner-ensemble.de

The Berliner Ensemble (German pronunciation: [bɛʁˈliːnɐ ʔãˈsãːbl̩]) is a German theatre company established by actress Helene Weigel and her husband, playwright Bertolt Brecht, in January 1949 in East Berlin. In the time after Brecht's exile, the company first worked at Wolfgang Langhoff's Deutsches Theater and in 1954 moved to the Theater am Schiffbauerdamm, built in 1892, that was open for the 1928 premiere of The Threepenny Opera (Die Dreigroschenoper).

== Bertolt Brecht's Berliner Ensemble ==
Brecht's students Benno Besson, Egon Monk, Peter Palitzsch, and Manfred Wekwerth were given the opportunity to direct plays by Brecht that had not yet been staged. The stage designers Caspar Neher and Karl von Appen, the composers Paul Dessau and Hanns Eisler, as well as the dramaturge Elisabeth Hauptmann, were among Brecht's closest collaborators. After her husband died in 1956, Weigel continued managing the Berliner Ensemble until her death in 1971.

The Berliner Ensemble achieved success through long and meticulous rehearsals, often spanning several months. Each production was documented with a Modellbuch, or preview album, containing 600 to 800 action photographs. The scenic designer Hainer Hill was among the photographers.

Die Dreigroschenoper and Happy End premiered in Berlin in 1928 and 1929 respectively, both at the Schiffbauerdamm Theatre, but twenty years before the founding of the Berliner Ensemble. Brecht wrote no new plays for the Berliner Ensemble, but remounted previously staged plays, premiering with Mother Courage and Her Children in 1949. He also directed The Caucasian Chalk Circle, and with Erich Engel, Life of Galileo. After Brecht's death, 3 plays, The Resistible Rise of Arturo Ui, Schweik in the Second World War, and The Visions of Simone Machard, had their premieres with the Ensemble.

== Post-Brechtian Berliner Ensemble ==
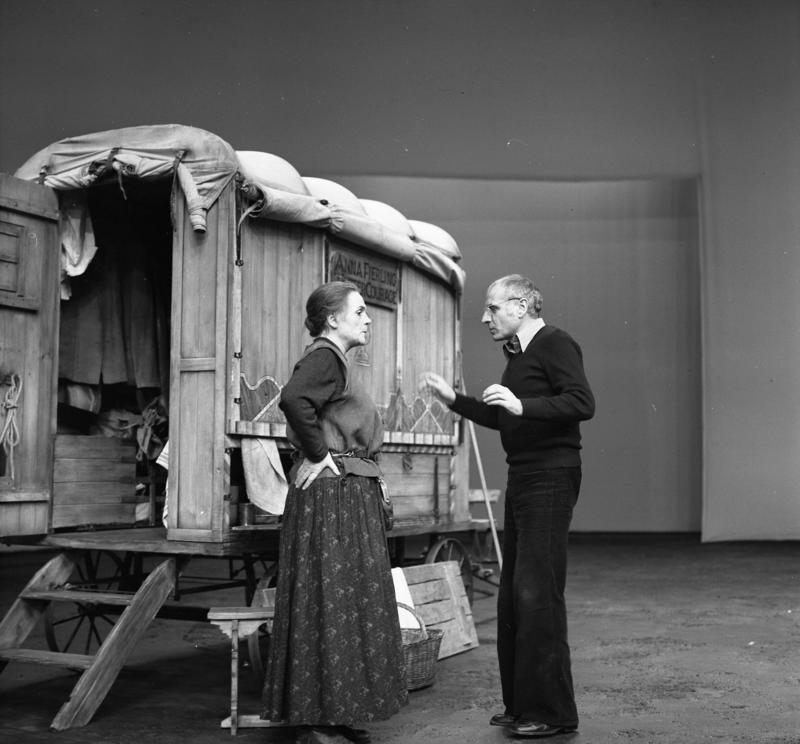
Manfred Wekwerth and Gisela May during rehearsals of Mother Courage and Her Children (1978)

Under the management of Helene Weigel's successor Ruth Berghaus, the company expanded its selection to that of other European playwrights in the 1970s. Major German actors, including Therese Giehse, Lionel Steckel, and Ernst Busch, appeared in Berliner productions. After German reunification, major changes took place at the theatre: in 1992, the Berlin Senate appointed a collective of five stage directors to serve as Intendanten (General Administrators): Peter Zadek, Peter Palitzsch, Heiner Müller, Fritz Marquardt, and Matthias Langhoff. In that same year, the internationally renowned conductor Alexander Frey was appointed music director of the Berliner Ensemble. Frey was the first American to hold a position at the Berliner Ensemble, as well as being the theatre's first non-German music director; his historic predecessors in that position include the composers Kurt Weill, Hanns Eisler, and Paul Dessau.

Under the new artistic management, the Berliner Ensemble changed from a state-owned theatre into a Gesellschaft mit beschränkter Haftung (limited liability company) subsidized by the city government. In 1993, the theatre company was privatized, but continued to receive $16 million in subsidy. Nevertheless, the idea of a joint administration proved a failure and the board of managers finally broke up in 1995, leaving only Heiner Müller. The quarrels, however, did not affect the artistic development of the ensemble: Young directors, including B. K. Tragelehn and Einar Schleef, and the stage designer Andreas Reinhardt, questioned the traditions of Brechtian theatre and introduced more contemporary theatre styles. Müller's production of Brecht's The Resistible Rise of Arturo Ui, with Martin Wuttke playing the title role, became one of the most successful in the history of the Berliner Ensemble. His program Brecht – Müller – Shakespeare remains their guiding legacy.

The American director Robert Wilson premiered Brecht's The Flight across the Ocean in 1998 to honour the hundredth anniversary of Brecht's birth. On 30 April 1999, the curtain came down on the final production of Heiner Müller's Die Bauern, an early end to the theatre's season that also marked the preliminary end of the ensemble. After Müller had died in December 1995, the difficult decision about who would manage this highly symbolic cultural institution was now exacerbated by another problem: the theatre building itself was in the process of being bought by a nonprofit foundation in the hands of dramatist Rolf Hochhuth, who seemed to have his own plans for the theatre. After the City of Berlin negotiated a settlement to everyone's satisfaction, the search for a new administration began. Claus Peymann, the provocative and successful manager of the Burgtheater in Vienna, was finally appointed to the position and reopened the theatre in January 2000, after extensive renovations were completed. Peymann's efforts have stabilized the theatre's operations. He assumed his role with a commitment—like Brecht's—to producing political theatre for the public, but more broadly interpreted.

In 2019, it was announced that an annex to Das Theater am Schiffbauerdamm would be built in autumn of that year, giving the theatre a second, fully equipped auditorium for the first time.

== Notable members ==
- Curt Bois
- Ernst Busch
- Angelica Domröse
- Erwin Geschonneck
- Therese Giehse
- Jürgen Holtz
- Gisela May
- Ingrid Pitt
- Ekkehard Schall
- Heinz Schubert
- Helene Weigel
- Christina Drechsler
