= Helene Weigel =

Austrian actress and artistic director (1900–1971)

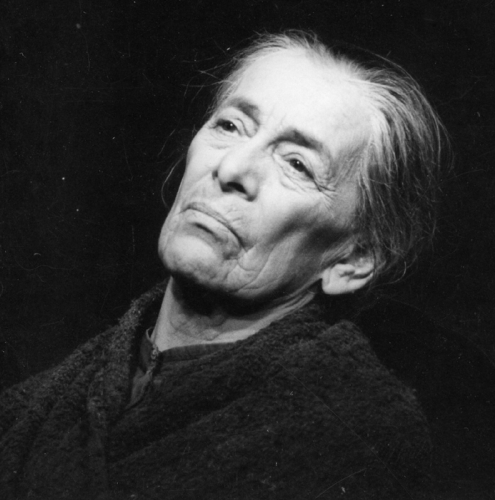
- Weigel in 1967, as "Mother" in Bertolt Brecht's play The Mother
- Born: Helene Weigel; 12 May 1900; Vienna, Austria-Hungary
- Died: 6 May 1971 (aged 70); East Berlin, East Germany
- Resting place: Dorotheenstadt Cemetery, East Berlin, East Germany
- Occupations: Actress; Artistic director
- Spouse: Bertolt Brecht (m. 1930; died 1956)
- Children: 2

Helene Weigel (German: [heˈleːnə ˈvaɪɡl̩]; 12 May 1900 – 6 May 1971) was an Austrian actress and artistic director. She was the second and last wife of Bertolt Brecht until his death in 1956; together they had two children.

== Personal life ==
Weigel was born in Vienna, Austria-Hungary, the daughter of Leopoldine (née Pollak) and Siegfried Weigel, an accountant-general in a textile factory. Her family was Jewish. She and husband Brecht had two children, Stefan Brecht and Barbara Brecht-Schall. Weigel was a Communist Party member from 1930.

== Career ==
Weigel became the artistic director of the Berliner Ensemble on 16 February 1949. She is best remembered for creating several Brecht roles, including: Pelagea Vlassova, The Mother of 1932; Antigone in Brecht's version of the Greek tragedy; the title role in his civil war play, Señora Carrar's Rifles; and the iconic Mother Courage.

Between 1933 and 1947, as a refugee from Adolf Hitler's Germany, she was seldom able to pursue her acting craft, even during the family's six-year period in Los Angeles. It was only with the foundation of the Berliner Ensemble in East Germany in 1949 that Brecht's theatre began to be recognized worldwide. She died in 1971, still at the helm of the company, and many of the roles that she created with Brecht are still in the theatre's repertoire today.

== Death ==
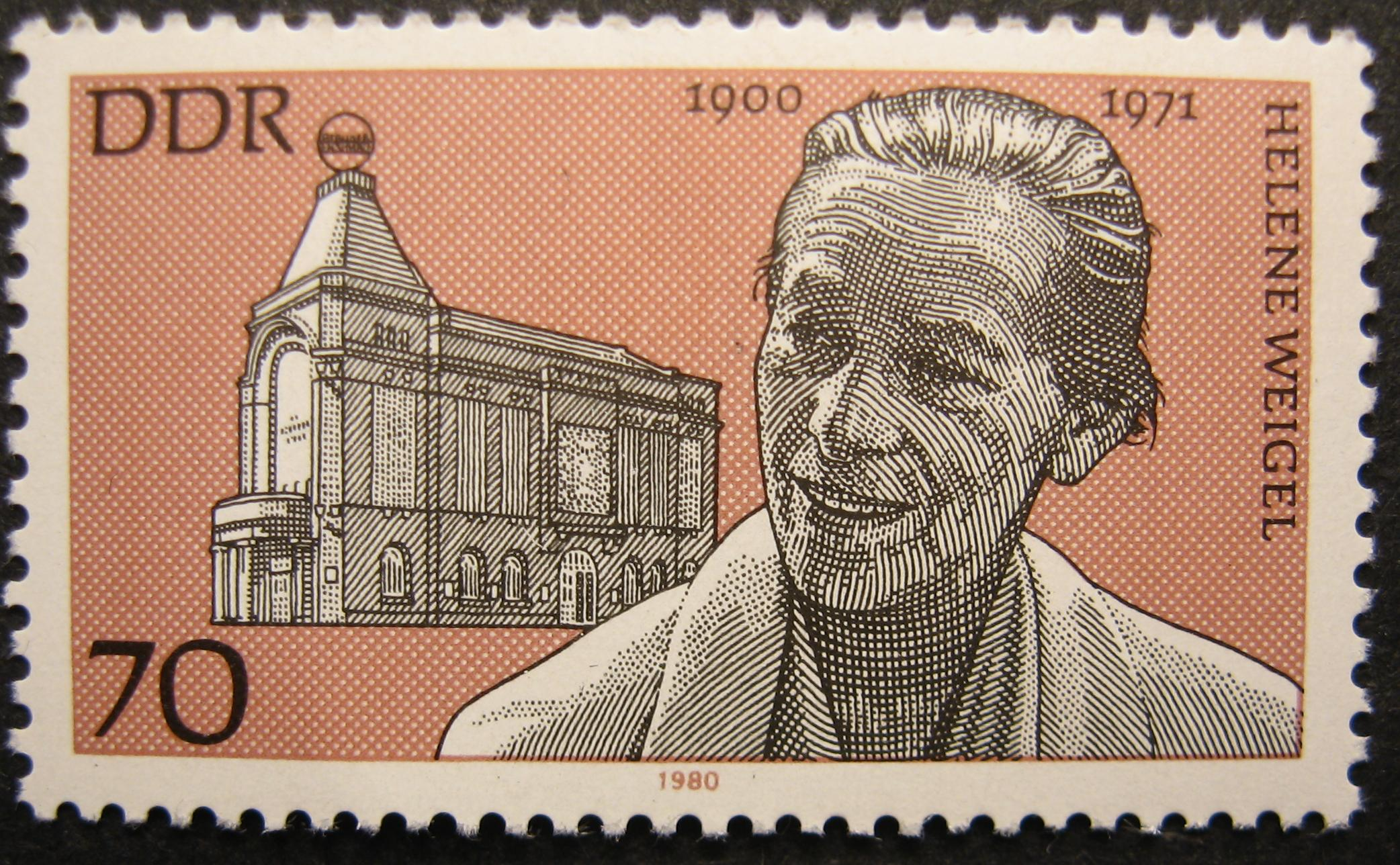
East German commemorative stamp for Helene Weigel

Weigel died in East Berlin on 6 May 1971, aged 70.

== Notable understudies ==
- Ingrid Pitt, British-Polish actress
