= Badlands (film) =

1973 American film by Terrence Malick

- Theatrical release poster
- Directed by: Terrence Malick
- Written by: Terrence Malick
- Produced by: Terrence Malick
- Starring: Martin Sheen; Sissy Spacek; Ramon Bieri; Warren Oates
- Cinematography: Brian Probyn; Tak Fujimoto; Stevan Larner
- Edited by: Robert Estrin
- Music by: George Tipton; Carl Orff; James Taylor; (theme "Migration")
- Distributed by: Warner Bros.
- Release date: October 15, 1973
- Running time: 93 minutes
- Country: United States
- Language: English
- Budget: $300,000 (estimated)

Badlands is a 1973 American neo-noir period crime drama film written, produced and directed by Terrence Malick, in his directorial debut. The film stars Martin Sheen and Sissy Spacek, and follows Kit Carruthers (Sheen), a 25-year-old who goes on a killing spree with his 15-year-old girlfriend Holly Sargis (Spacek). The film also stars Warren Oates and Ramon Bieri. While the story is fictional, it is loosely based on the real-life murder spree of Charles Starkweather and his girlfriend, Caril Ann Fugate, in 1958.

Badlands was released in 1973 to critical acclaim, with praise for its direction, cinematography, soundtrack (which includes pieces by Carl Orff), and lead performances. At the 28th British Academy Film Awards, Spacek was nominated for the Most Promising Newcomer to Leading Film Roles award, and Sheen won the Best Actor award at the San Sebastián International Film Festival.

In 1993, the film was selected for preservation in the United States National Film Registry by the Library of Congress as being "culturally, historically, or aesthetically significant".

== Plot ==
In 1959, Holly Sargis narrates the film as a 15-year-old living in Fort Dupree, a dead-end South Dakota town. She has a strained relationship with her father, a sign painter, since her mother's death from pneumonia years earlier. Holly meets Kit Carruthers, a 25-year-old garbage collector, troubled greaser and Korean War veteran. He resembles James Dean, an actor whom Holly admires. After Kit charms Holly, they have sex. As they become closer, his violent and anti-social tendencies are gradually revealed.

Holly's father disapproves of Kit and kills her dog as punishment for seeing him. Kit breaks into Holly's house and insists she run away with him. When her father threatens to call the police, Kit fatally shoots him. After Kit and Holly fake suicide by burning the house, they head for the badlands of Montana. They build a tree house in a remote area where they fish and steal chickens for food. They flee when found by three men (who Kit later tells Holly were bounty hunters) whom Kit shoots dead. They seek refuge with Kit's former co-worker, Cato, but when he attempts to summon help, Kit shoots him, too. A young couple arrive and are forced into the storm cellar. Kit shoots into the closed cellar door and leaves without knowing if they are dead.

Law enforcement pursue Kit and Holly across the Northern Plains. They stop at a rich man's mansion and take supplies, clothing, and his Cadillac, sparing the man and his deaf housemaid. As they drive across Montana towards Canada, the police find and chase them.

Holly, who has grown tired of Kit and life on the run, refuses to go with him and turns herself in. Kit leads the police on a car chase, but is soon caught. He charms the arresting officers and National Guard troops, tossing them his personal belongings as souvenirs of his crime spree. Holly reveals at the end that she received probation and married her defense attorney's son. Kit was executed for his crimes.

== Cast ==
- Martin Sheen as Kit
- Sissy Spacek as Holly
- Warren Oates as Father
- Ramon Bieri as Cato
- Alan Vint as Deputy (Tom)
- Gary Littlejohn as Sheriff
- John Carter as Rich Man
- Bryan Montgomery as Boy
- Gail Threlkeld as Girl
- Charley Fitzpatrick as Clerk
- Howard Ragsdale as Boss
- John Womack, Jr. as Trooper
- Dona Baldwin as Maid
- Ben Bravo as Gas Attendant

Director Terrence Malick makes a cameo as the man at the rich man's door, while Sheen's sons – Charlie Sheen and Emilio Estevez – appear briefly as two boys sitting under a lamppost outside Holly's house.

== Production ==
=== Writing and casting ===
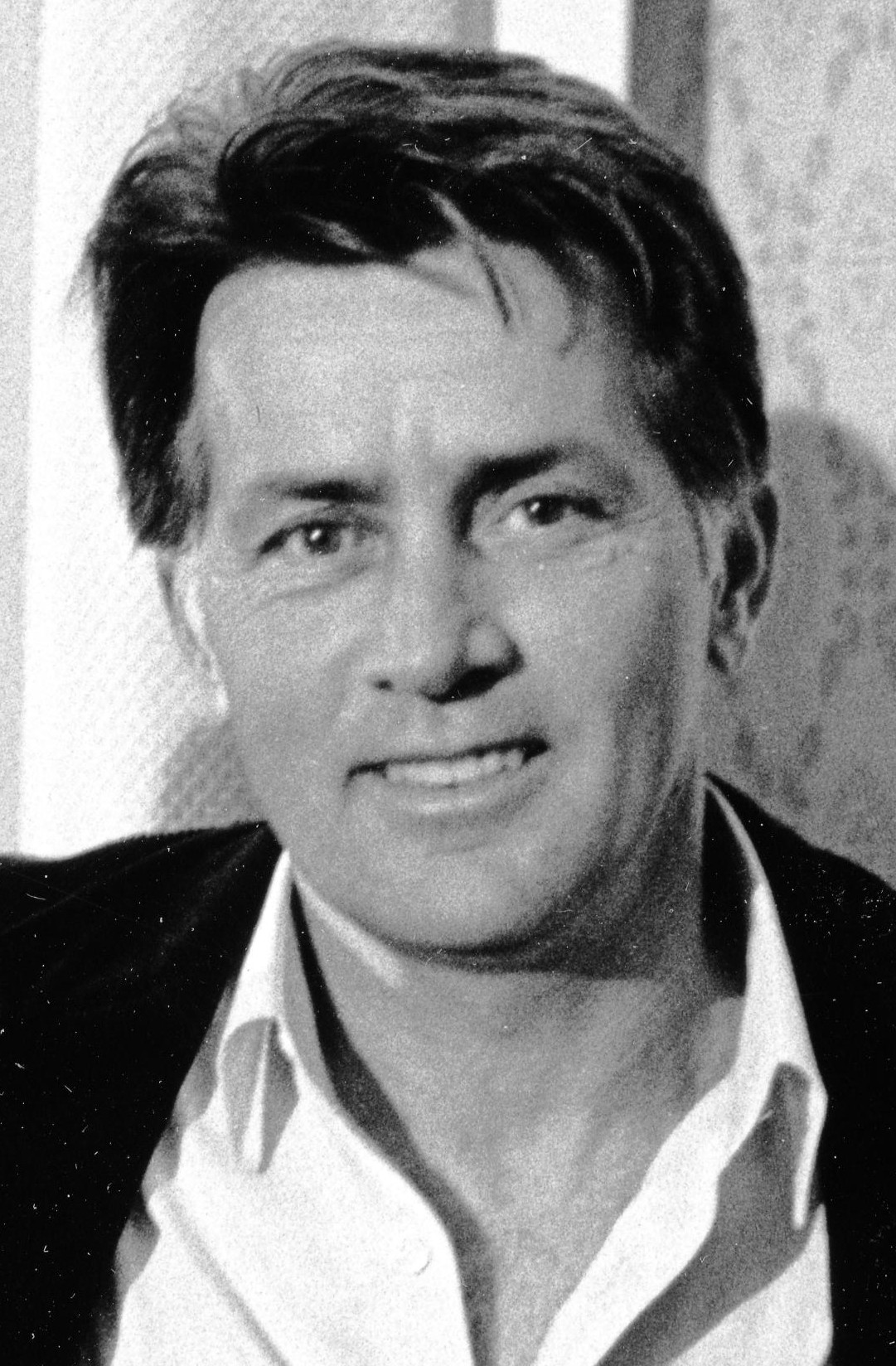
Sheen (pictured in 1987) was chosen for the role of Kit Carruther, based on his immediate chemistry with co-star Spacek.

Malick, a protégé of Arthur Penn (whom he thanked in the film's end credits), began work on Badlands after his second year attending the American Film Institute. In 1970, Malick, at age 27, began working on the screenplay during a road trip. "I wrote and, at the same time, developed a kind of sales kit with slides and video tape of actors, all with a view to presenting investors with something that would look ready to shoot," Malick said. "To my surprise, they didn't pay too much attention to it; they invested on faith. I raised about half the money and executive producer Edward Pressman the other half." Malick paid $25,000 of his own funds. The remainder of his share was raised from professionals such as doctors and dentists. Badlands was the first feature film that Malick had written for himself to direct.

Sissy Spacek, in only her second film, was the first actor cast. Malick found her small-town Texas roots and accent were perfect for the part of the naive impressionable high school girl. The director included her in his creative process, asking questions about her life "as if he were mining for gold." When he found out she had been a majorette, he worked a twirling routine into the script. Several up-and-coming actors were auditioned for the part of Kit Carruthers. When Martin Sheen was suggested by the casting director, Malick was hesitant, thinking he was too old for the role. Spacek wrote in her autobiography that "the chemistry was immediate. He was Kit. And with him, I was Holly." Sheen based his characterization of Kit on the actor James Dean.

=== Filming and set design ===
Principal photography took place in Colorado starting in July 1972, with a non-union crew and a low budget of $300,000 (excluding some deferments to film labs and actors). The film had a somewhat troubled production history: several members of the crew clashed with Malick, and another was severely injured when an explosion occurred while filming the fire scene. Malick's first cinematographer, Brian Probyn, quit mid-shoot after balking at the director's unorthodox methods. He was replaced first by Tak Fujimoto, then by Stevan Larner, who finished the film. "Amazingly, despite the input of these different hands, the film looks remarkably seamless," said producer Edward R. Pressman.

The Frank G. Bloom House in Trinidad, Colorado, was used for the rich man's house. Malick himself had an uncredited cameo after the actor hired to play 'Caller at Rich Man's House' failed to show up. The script's beginning was mostly filmed in the southeastern Colorado towns of La Junta and Las Animas, including the scene in which Holly runs out of the latter town's Columbian Elementary School. The closing credits thank the people of Otero County "for their help and cooperation."

Jack Fisk served as art director for the film in his first of several collaborations with the director. During production, Sissy Spacek and Fisk fell in love and were married on April 12, 1974. Fisk and Malick continued to collaborate for the majority of the director's films, including To the Wonder and Knight of Cups. Badlands was edited by Robert Estrin, who is credited as the sole editor.

Though Malick paid close attention to period detail, he did not want it to overwhelm the picture. "I tried to keep the 1950s to a bare minimum," he said. "Nostalgia is a powerful feeling; it can drown out anything. I wanted the picture to set up like a fairy tale, outside time." At a news conference coinciding with the film's festival debut, Malick called Kit "so desensitized that [he] can regard the gun with which he shoots people as a kind of magic wand that eliminates small nuisances." Malick also pointed out that "Kit and Holly even think of themselves as living in a fairy tale", and he felt this was appropriate since "children's books like Treasure Island were often filled with violence." He also hoped a fairy tale tone would "take a little of the sharpness out of the violence but still keep its dreamy quality."

=== Soundtrack ===
The film makes repeated use of the short composition Gassenhauer from Carl Orff's and Gunild Keetman's Schulwerk, and also uses other tunes by Erik Satie, Nat "King" Cole, Mickey & Sylvia and James Taylor.

== Release and reception ==
Warner Bros. purchased and distributed the film for just under $1 million. Warner Bros. initially previewed the film on a double bill with the Mel Brooks comedy Blazing Saddles, resulting in very negative audience response. The production team was forced to book the film into several other theaters, in locations such as Little Rock, Arkansas, to demonstrate that it could make money.

The film holds a 97% rating on Rotten Tomatoes based on the reviews of 61 critics, with an average rating of 9.2/10. The site’s critical consensus states, "Terrence Malick's debut is a masterful slice of American cinema, rife with the visual poetry and measured performances that would characterize his work." On Metacritic, the film holds a weighted score of 94 out of 100 based on 21 reviews, indicating "universal acclaim". Variety stated that the film was an "impressive" debut. Roger Ebert added it to his "Great Movies" list in 2011.

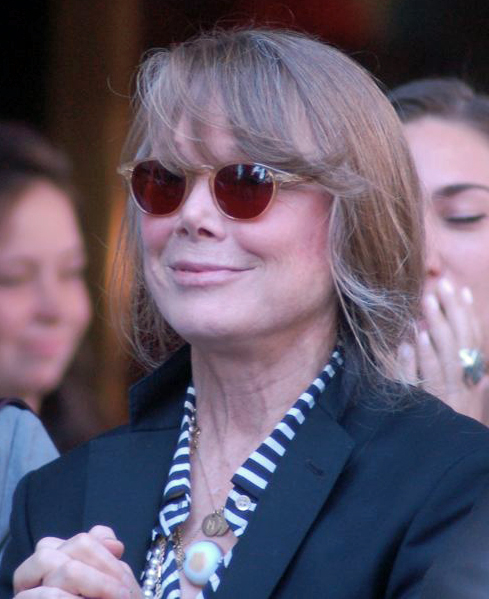
Spacek (pictured here in 2013) plays Holly Sargis in the film. She was lauded for her performance, and earned a BAFTA Award nomination.

Badlands was the closing feature film at the 1973 New York Film Festival, reportedly "overshadowing even Martin Scorsese's Mean Streets." Vincent Canby, who saw the film at the festival debut, called it a "cool, sometimes brilliant, always ferociously American film"; according to Canby, "Sheen and Miss Spacek are splendid as the self-absorbed, cruel, possibly psychotic children of our time, as are the members of the supporting cast, including Warren Oates as Holly's father. One may legitimately debate the validity of Malick's vision, but not, I think, his immense talent. Badlands is a most important and exciting film."

In April 1974, Jay Cocks wrote that the film "might better be regarded less as a companion piece to Bonnie and Clyde than as an elaboration and reply. It is not loose and high-spirited. All its comedy has a frosty irony, and its violence, instead of being brutally balletic, is executed with a dry, remorseless drive." According to executive producer Edward Pressman, apart from Canby's New York Times review, most initial reviews of the film were negative, but its reputation with critics improved over time. David Thomson conversely reported that the work was "by common consent [...] one of the most remarkable first feature films made in America." Writing years later for The Chicago Reader, Dave Kehr wrote: "Malick's 1973 first feature is a film so rich in ideas it hardly knows where to turn. Transcendent themes of love and death are fused with a pop-culture sensibility and played out against a midwestern background, which is breathtaking both in its sweep and in its banality."

Spacek later said that Badlands changed the way she thought about filmmaking. "After working with Terry Malick, I was like, 'The artist rules. Nothing else matters.' My career would have been very different if I hadn't had that experience". In 2003, Bill Paxton said: "It had a lyricism that films have only once in a while, moments of a transcendental nature.... There's this wonderful sequence where the couple have been cut adrift from civilisation. They know the noose is tightening and they've gone off the road, across the Badlands. You hear Sissy narrating various stories, and she's talking about visiting faraway places. There's this strange piece of classical music [an ethereal orchestration of Erik Satie's Trois Morceaux en forme de Poire], and a very long-lens shot. You see something in the distance – I think it's a train moving – and it looks like a shot of an Arabian caravan moving across the desert. These are moments that have nothing to do with the story, and yet everything to do with it. They're not plot-orientated, but they have to do with the longing or the dreams of these characters. And they're the kind of moments you never forget, a certain kind of lyricism that just strikes some deep part of you and that you hold on to."

Martin Sheen commented in 1999 that Badlands "still is" the best script he had ever read. He wrote that "It was mesmerising. It disarmed you. It was a period piece, and yet of all time. It was extremely American, it caught the spirit of the people, of the culture, in a way that was immediately identifiable."

== In popular culture ==
Clips from Badlands appear in Springsteen: Deliver Me from Nowhere, illustrating Bruce Springsteen's interest in the Starkweather murders and subsequent composition of the title track of the Nebraska album about those killings.

== See also ==
- List of American films of 1973
- List of cult films – List of films that generated cult following
- The Sadist – 1963 American crime film also loosely based on the murders
- Natural Born Killers – 1994 crime film by Oliver Stone, telling the story of two lovers and mass murderers irresponsibly glorified by the mass media
- True Romance – 1993 American romantic crime film by Tony Scott with similar dramatic motifs, voice-over, and music
- United States in the 1950s
