= True Romance =

1993 American romantic crime film by Tony Scott

- Theatrical release poster
- Directed by: Tony Scott
- Written by: Quentin Tarantino
- Produced by: Samuel Hadida; Steve Perry; Bill Unger
- Starring: Christian Slater; Patricia Arquette; Dennis Hopper; Val Kilmer; Gary Oldman; Brad Pitt; Christopher Walken
- Cinematography: Jeffrey L. Kimball
- Edited by: Michael Tronick; Christian Wagner
- Music by: Hans Zimmer
- Production companies: Morgan Creek Productions; Davis Films
- Distributed by: Warner Bros. (United States, Canada and United Kingdom); August Entertainment (international)
- Release date: September 10, 1993
- Running time: 118 minutes
- Country: United States
- Language: English
- Budget: $12.5 million
- Box office: $12.6 million

True Romance (Note: The film was released in a re-edited format in the Philippines under the title Breakaway.) is a 1993 American romantic crime film directed by Tony Scott and written by Quentin Tarantino. It stars Christian Slater and Patricia Arquette, with James Gandolfini, Dennis Hopper, Val Kilmer, Gary Oldman, Brad Pitt, and Christopher Walken in supporting roles. Slater and Arquette portray newlyweds who head to California with a stolen suitcase of drugs, with the Mafia in close pursuit and their future very uncertain.

True Romance began as an early script by Tarantino; he sold the screenplay in order to finance his debut feature film, Reservoir Dogs (1992). It is regarded by proponents as a cross-section of writer Tarantino and director Scott's respective trademarks, including a Southern California setting, pop cultural references, and stylized violence punctuated by slow motion.

Though initially a box-office failure, the film's positive reviews, with critics praising the dialogue, characters, and offbeat style, helped it earn a cult following. It has come to be considered one of Scott's best films.

== Plot ==
At a Detroit theater showing kung fu films, Alabama Whitman strikes up a conversation with Elvis Presley fanatic Clarence Worley. They later have sex at his downtown apartment. Alabama tearfully confesses that she is a call girl hired by Clarence's boss as a birthday present but has fallen in love with him. The two get married the next day at City Hall. An apparition of Elvis convinces Clarence to kill Alabama's abusive pimp, Drexl Spivey. Going to the brothel where Alabama worked, he shoots and kills Drexl and takes a bag he assumes contains Alabama's belongings. Back at the apartment, he and Alabama discover it contains a large amount of cocaine that Drexl had stolen from two drug pushers that he had murdered.

The couple ask Clarence's estranged father Clifford, a retired police officer, for help. He tells Clarence the police assume Drexl's murder is a gang killing committed in revenge for the slain dealers. After the couple leave for Los Angeles, Clifford is interrogated by Vincenzo Coccotti, consigliere to mobster "Blue Lou Boyle", who had hired Drexl to steal and distribute the cocaine on his behalf. He reveals that the mob knows about Clarence's theft since they found his driver's license near Drexl's body. Clifford, realizing he will die anyway, mockingly defies Coccotti, who shoots him dead. One of his men then finds a Los Angeles address taped to Clifford's refrigerator.

In Los Angeles, Clarence and Alabama meet Clarence's aspiring actor friend, Dick Ritchie, who introduces him to actor and production assistant Elliot Blitzer. He reluctantly agrees to broker the sale of the drugs to his boss, film producer Lee Donowitz. While Clarence is out buying lunch, Coccotti's enforcer Virgil finds Alabama in their motel room and beats her for information. Alabama fights back, stabbing him with a corkscrew, putting nail polish remover in his eyes and using hairspray to set fire to Virgil's face before grabbing his sawed-off shotgun and shooting him to death in a maniacal rage. Clarence tends to Alabama's wounds, and they discuss their future together.

Elliot is pulled over for speeding and gets charged when the prostitute he is with hits him with a bag of cocaine and spills it on him. To stay out of jail, he agrees to wear a wire and record the drug deal between Clarence and Donowitz for police detectives Dimes and Nicholson. Coccotti's men learn where the deal will take place from Dick's stoner roommate Floyd. Clarence, Alabama, Dick, and Elliot go to Donowitz's suite at the Ambassador Hotel with the drugs. In the elevator, a suspicious Clarence threatens Elliot at gunpoint but is persuaded by Elliot's pleading for mercy.

Clarence fabricates a story for Donowitz that the drugs were given to him by a corrupt police officer, and he agrees to the sale. Clarence goes to the bathroom, and the vision of Elvis reassures him that things are going well. Meanwhile, Donowitz and his bodyguards are ambushed by the police and the mobsters. Elliot reveals himself to be an informant by asking the officers if he can leave, whereupon a shootout erupts. Dick throws the suitcase of drugs into the air, where it gets shredded by gunfire, and flees. Donowitz, his bodyguards, Elliot, the officers, and the mobsters are all killed, and Clarence is wounded. He and Alabama flee with Donowitz's money to Mexico, where Alabama gives birth to a son, whom they name Elvis.

== Cast ==
- Christian Slater as Clarence Worley
- Patricia Arquette as Alabama Whitman-Worley
- Dennis Hopper as Clifford Worley
- Val Kilmer as Elvis
- Gary Oldman as Drexl Spivey
- Brad Pitt as Floyd, Dick's roommate
- Christopher Walken as Vincenzo Coccotti
- Bronson Pinchot as Elliot Blitzer
- Samuel L. Jackson as Don "Big Don"
- Michael Rapaport as Dick Ritchie
- Saul Rubinek as Lee Donowitz
- Conchata Ferrell as Mary Louise Ravencroft
- James Gandolfini as Virgil
- Anna Thomson as Lucy
- Victor Argo as Lenny
- Paul Bates as Marty
- Chris Penn as Detective Nicky Dimes
- Tom Sizemore as Detective Cody Nicholson
- Gregory Sporleder as burger stand customer
- Maria Pitillo as Kandi
- Frank Adonis as Frankie
- Kevin Corrigan as Marvin
- Paul Ben-Victor as Luca
- Michael Beach as Detective Wurlitzer
- Eric Allan Kramer as Boris
- Patrick John Hurley as Monty
- Laurence Mason as Floyd "D"
- Ed Lauter as Captain Quiggle (uncredited)

Additionally, Arquette's son Enzo Rossi plays Elvis in the final scene of the film.

== Production ==
The title and plot are a play on the titles of romance comic books such as True Life Secrets, True Stories of Romance, Romance Tales, Untamed Love and Strange Love.

The film was a breakthrough for Quentin Tarantino, who wrote the script while working at Video Archives. Released after Reservoir Dogs, it was his first screenplay for a major motion picture. He had hoped to direct the film, but lost interest in directing and sold the script. According to Tarantino's audio commentary on the DVD release, he was happy with the way it turned out. Apart from changing the nonlinear narrative he wrote to a more conventional linear structure, it was largely faithful to his original screenplay. He initially opposed director Tony Scott's decision to change the ending (which Scott maintained was of his own volition, not the studio's, saying "I just fell in love with these two characters and didn't want to see them die"). When seeing the completed film, he realized Scott's happy ending was more appropriate to the film as Scott directed it. The film's first act, as well as some fragments of dialogue, were repurposed from Tarantino's 1987 amateur film My Best Friend's Birthday.

The film's score by Hans Zimmer incorporates "Gassenhauer" from Carl Orff's Schulwerk. The piece was a motif in Terrence Malick's 1973 crime film Badlands, which was an inspiration for True Romance. In addition to using Orff's music, Arquette's voiceover is an homage to Sissy Spacek's narration in Badlands.

The movie was cut by the United States MPAA for an R rating for its wide theatrical release. The majority of the confrontation between Alabama and Virgil was cut, as well as the ending shootout scene. There was also an alternative edit where Detective Nicky Dimes is shot not by Alabama, but by Toothpick Vic, one of the mafia hitmen. This edit was the official 1993 rental VHS release, but subsequently all DVD and most Blu-ray releases are of the original unrated director's cut. The 2022 4K release from Arrow, however, has both cuts of the film.

Christian Slater admitted to have been romantically involved with his co-star Patricia Arquette while shooting, even if only for a short time. The protracted nude love scene they had together was, Slater said, "really special. I lost sight of the crew being around. It was the first time nothing on the outside really mattered."

== Reception ==
=== Box office ===
Although a critical success, True Romance was a box office failure. The film earned $4 million during its opening weekend, ranking in third place behind The Fugitive and Undercover Blues. It was given a domestic release and earned $12.3 million on a $12.5 million budget. Despite this, the film developed a cult following over the years.

=== Critical response ===
On the review aggregator website Rotten Tomatoes, the film holds an approval rating of 93% based on 60 reviews, with an average rating of 7.8/10. The website's critics consensus reads, "Fueled by Quentin Tarantino's savvy screenplay and a gallery of oddball performances, Tony Scott's True Romance is a funny and violent action jaunt in the best sense." Metacritic, which uses a weighted average, assigned the film a score of 59 out of 100 based on 19 critics, indicating "mixed or average" reviews. Audiences polled by CinemaScore gave the film an average grade of "B−" on an A+ to F scale.

Phil Villarreal of the Arizona Daily Star called it "one of the most dynamic action films of the 1990s". Peter Travers of Rolling Stone gave it three stars, saying "it's Tarantino's gutter poetry that detonates True Romance. This movie is dynamite."

Roger Ebert gave the film a positive review remarking that "the energy and style of the movie are exhilarating", and that "the supporting cast is superb, a roll call of actors at home in these violent waters: Christopher Walken, Dennis Hopper, and Brad Pitt, for example". A negative review by The Washington Post's Richard Harrington claimed the film was "stylistically visceral" yet "aesthetically corrupt".

Janet Maslin of The New York Times wrote, "True Romance, a vibrant, grisly, gleefully amoral road movie directed by Tony Scott and dominated by the machismo of Quentin Tarantino (who wrote this screenplay before he directed Reservoir Dogs), is sure to offend a good-sized segment of the moviegoing population".

=== Accolades ===
In 1993, Tarantino's screenplay for the film was nominated at the 20th Saturn Awards for "Best Writing".

== Legacy ==
Empire ranked True Romance the 83rd greatest film of all time in 2017, writing: "Tony Scott's handling of Quentin Tarantino's script came off like the cinematic equivalent of cocaine-flavoured bubble-gum: a bright, flavoursome confection that had an intoxicatingly violent kick. It also drew some tremendous big names to its supporting cast."

The Hopper/Walken scene, colloquially named "The Sicilian scene", was praised by Oliver Lyttelton of IndieWire, who called it "one of the most beautiful tête-à-têtes in contemporary cinema, wonderfully written and made utterly iconic by the two virtuoso actors". Tarantino himself has named it as one of his proudest moments. "I had heard that whole speech about the Sicilians a long time ago, from a black guy living in my house. One day I was talking with a friend who was Sicilian and I just started telling that speech. And I thought: 'Wow, that is a great scene, I gotta remember that'."

Oldman's villain also garnered acclaim. MSN Movies wrote: "With just a few minutes of screen time, Gary Oldman crafts one of cinema's most memorable villains: the brutal, dreadlocked pimp Drexl Spivey. Even in a movie jammed with memorable cameos from screen luminaries [...] Oldman's scar-faced, dead-eyed, lethal gangster stood out." Jason Serafino of Complex magazine named Spivey as one of the top five coolest drug dealers in movie history, writing: "He's not in the film for a long time, but the few scant moments that Gary Oldman plays the psychopathic dealer Drexl Spivey make True Romance a classic ... Oldman gave us a glimpse at one of cinema's most unfiltered sociopaths." Maxim journalist Thomas Freeman ranked Spivey as the greatest performance of Oldman's career.

"Robbers", a song by the English indie rock band the 1975 from their 2013 debut album, was inspired by the film. Vocalist Matthew Healy explained: "I got really obsessed with the idea behind Patricia Arquette's character in True Romance when I was about eighteen. That craving for the bad boy in that film [is] so sexualized."

True Romance, the 2013 debut album from English pop star Charli XCX, was named after the film.

Brad Pitt's stoner character in True Romance, Floyd, was the inspiration for making the film Pineapple Express, according to producer Judd Apatow, who "thought it would be funny to make a movie in which you follow that character out of his apartment and watch him get chased by bad guys".

James Gandolfini landed his role of Tony Soprano on The Sopranos when he was invited to audition for the role after casting director Susan Fitzgerald saw a short clip of his performance in True Romance. Gandolfini ultimately received the role ahead of several other actors, including Steven Van Zandt and Michael Rispoli.

In the trance song "Solarcoaster" by Solarstone, a sample is used from the film. The sample includes the line spoken by Alabama, "That three words went through my mind endlessly. Repeating themselves like a broken record. You're so cool. You're so cool. You're so cool."

On December 16, 2015, Tarantino's screenplay was used for a staged reading at the United Artists Theater in the Ace Hotel Los Angeles. The event was organized by the Film Independent at Los Angeles County Museum of Art (LACMA) as part of the Live Read series.

On November 26, 2024, on the Talking Pictures Podcast, Margot Robbie stated that the film is her favorite, and that she walked down the aisle at her wedding to the theme, "You're So Cool".

== Home media ==
True Romance was originally released by Warner Home Video on VHS on September 12, 1994. This release contains only the director's cut, however the theatrical cut was released on an R rated rental VHS.

The DVD was released on September 24, 2002, as a two-disc set. It was later released on Blu-ray on May 26, 2009. Again, these releases only contain the director's cut, and the theatrical cut remained excluded.

The 4K UHD Blu-ray was released on June 28, 2022, by Arrow Video. Unlike the previous DVD and Blu-ray releases, this release contains the theatrical cut for the first time since the original VHS release, it also includes the director's cut from past DVD and Blu-ray releases.

== See also ==
- List of American films of 1993
- List of works by Quentin Tarantino
- Quentin Tarantino's unrealized projects
