= Gassenhauer =

Composition by Carl Orff in 1920s

Gassenhauer (pronounced [ˈɡasn̩ˌhaʊ̯ɐ]) is a German street song. It is also the name of a short piece by Hans Neusidler which was popularized in the 20th century by Gunild Keetman and Carl Orff.

== History ==
Gassenhauer is a German street song. The term became familiar in the 16th century and could be applied to any kind of folk song. In Josua Maaler's 1561 dictionary, gassenhauer is defined as a "low song". Hans Sachs referenced the genre in a 1567 collection of his work. In Richard Wagner's 1868 opera Die Meistersinger von Nürnberg, Sixtus Beckmesser dismisses Sachs as a gassenhauer composer.

In the 18th century, Johann Gottfried Herder began describing rural folk songs as volkslied, and the term quickly supplanted gassenhauer, which continued to be applied to urban street songs. Some volkslied and gassenhauer could also be called schlager, which is a term for popular or hit music. Albeit, when a volkslied becomes a hit, it tends to lose credibility.

== Neusidler ==
Incipit from transcription of Hans Neusidler's "Gassenhauer".

In 1536, Hans Neusidler published a method book for lute. After a substantial section on the technique of lute playing, the book includes several pieces including a gassenhauer.

During the 1920s, Carl Orff and Gunild Keetman developed Hans Neusidler's "Gassenhauer" into a teaching piece for Orff Schulwerk. The exercise is a series of variations on Neusidler's lute composition. Gassenhauer is designed to teach the classic cadential progression from the subdominant chord to the dominant before the return to the tonic. In a centennial recording of Orff's work, "Gassenhauer" was credited solely to Keetman.

"Gassenhauer" has been widely used in film, television, and radio. Terrence Malick indelibly used it as the main theme in his highly influential 1973 movie Badlands. The simplicity of Orff's music for children is juxtaposed with the bloody crime spree of the young couple in Malick's film. Quentin Tarantino paid homage to Badlands in his screenplay for True Romance (1993), which was directed by Tony Scott. "Gassenhauer" is a recurring motif in the film's score to emphasize the link between the films.

The composition also appears in Lynne Ramsay's 1999 film Ratcatcher. "Gassenhauer" features in Finding Forrester (2000), Monster (2003), Michael Moore's Capitalism: A Love Story (2009), Priscilla (2023),The Simpsons' 22nd-season episode "The Scorpion's Tale" (2011), Friend of the World (2020), The Simpsons' 33rd-season episode "Mothers and Other Strangers" (2021) and Mad God (2021). The piece was used as the theme music for an afternoon radio program also titled Gassenhauer on the classical music station WCLV in Cleveland, Ohio, in the 1970s.

== See also ==
- Piano Trio, Op. 11 (Beethoven), 1797 composition also known as "The Gassenhauer Trio".
- The Street Song, 1931 German film originally titled Gassenhauer.
