= Gertrud Orff =

German music therapist (1914–2000)

- Born: Gertrud Willert; 9 August 1914; Munich, Kingdom of Bavaria, German Empire
- Died: 1 May 2000 (aged 85); Munich, Bavaria, Germany
- Occupation: Music therapist
- Known for: Orff Music Therapy
- Spouse: Carl Orff (m. 1939; div. 1953)

Gertrud Orff (née Willert; 9 August 1914 in Munich – 1 May 2000 in Munich) was one of the first German music therapists. She developed Orff Music Therapy and, from 1939 to 1953, was the second wife and collaborator of the composer Carl Orff.

== Biography ==
Gertrud Willert was born on 9 August 1914 in Munich. Little is known about her life before she married Carl Orff (1895–1982). It is known that after graduating from high school, she attended a private business school. Contrary to the wishes of her father, who wanted her to study medicine, she devoted herself to music and met Carl Orff. She was one of his first students and they married 1939. She was his second wife, divorcing in 1953. Gertrud was involved in the development of her husband's Schulwerk (School Work) and tested it in public schools in the United States. This experience gave her an introduction to working with disabled and developmentally disabled children.

Her first independent works were published from 1954 to 1959 under the name Gertrud Willert-Orff, in four volumes entitled Small Piano Pieces and listing her as the composer. Her main publications as a music therapy specialist are The Orff Music Therapy. Actively Promoting Child Development (1974) and Key Concepts of the Orff Music Therapy (1984). Both were published under the name Gertrud Orff and have appeared in English, French, Spanish and Japanese. From 1970 until her retirement in 1984, she worked as a music therapist at the social pediatric children's center in Munich under Theodor Hellbrügge, who supported her work and promoted her publications.

=== Orff Music Therapy ===
Gertrud's Orff Music Therapy, based on Carl Orff's Schulwerk, is a development-oriented, child-centered, development-promoting music therapy. It is aimed primarily at children with sensory impairments, developmental disorders, and other disabilities or with an autism spectrum disorder. Related work takes up the ideas of elementary music education, a playful and multisensory approach, and further developed them into a methodology individually tailored to the needs of children with disabilities.

Gertrud Orff was committed to the development of the emerging professional profile of music therapy in the forerunner form of the German Music Therapy Society. From 1980 onwards she passed on her knowledge to students attending courses, which from 1986 gave rise to further training, which is continued by the German Academy for Development Promotion and Health of Children and Adolescents. A year before her death she was involved in founding the Society for Orff Music Therapy based on Gertrud's work. She died in Munich on 1 May 2000.

=== Students ===
Gertrud Orff's many students have included the music therapists Christine Plahl and Susanna Filesch (Catholic Foundation, LMU Munich), Karin Schumacher (Berlin University of the Arts), Ursula Stiff (new music forum) and Melanie Voigt (Children's Center Munich).

== Honors ==
- 1986: Order of Merit of the Federal Republic of Germany for special services in working with disabled children.

== Selected works ==
- Orff, G. (1976). Multisensorischer Einsatz der Musik in der Therapie mit entwicklungsgestörten Kindern. In: Praktische Psychiatrie; Sonderdruck Musiktherapie in der Psychiatrie, pp. 36–41.
- Orff, G. (1974, 1980). The Orff Music Therapy. Translated by Margaret Murray. New York: Schott Music Corporation.
- Orff, G. (1984, 1989). Key Concepts in the Orff Music Therapy. Translated by Jeremy Day and Shirley Salmon. London: Schott.
