= Prinzregententheater =

Coordinates: 48°08′20″N 11°36′20″E

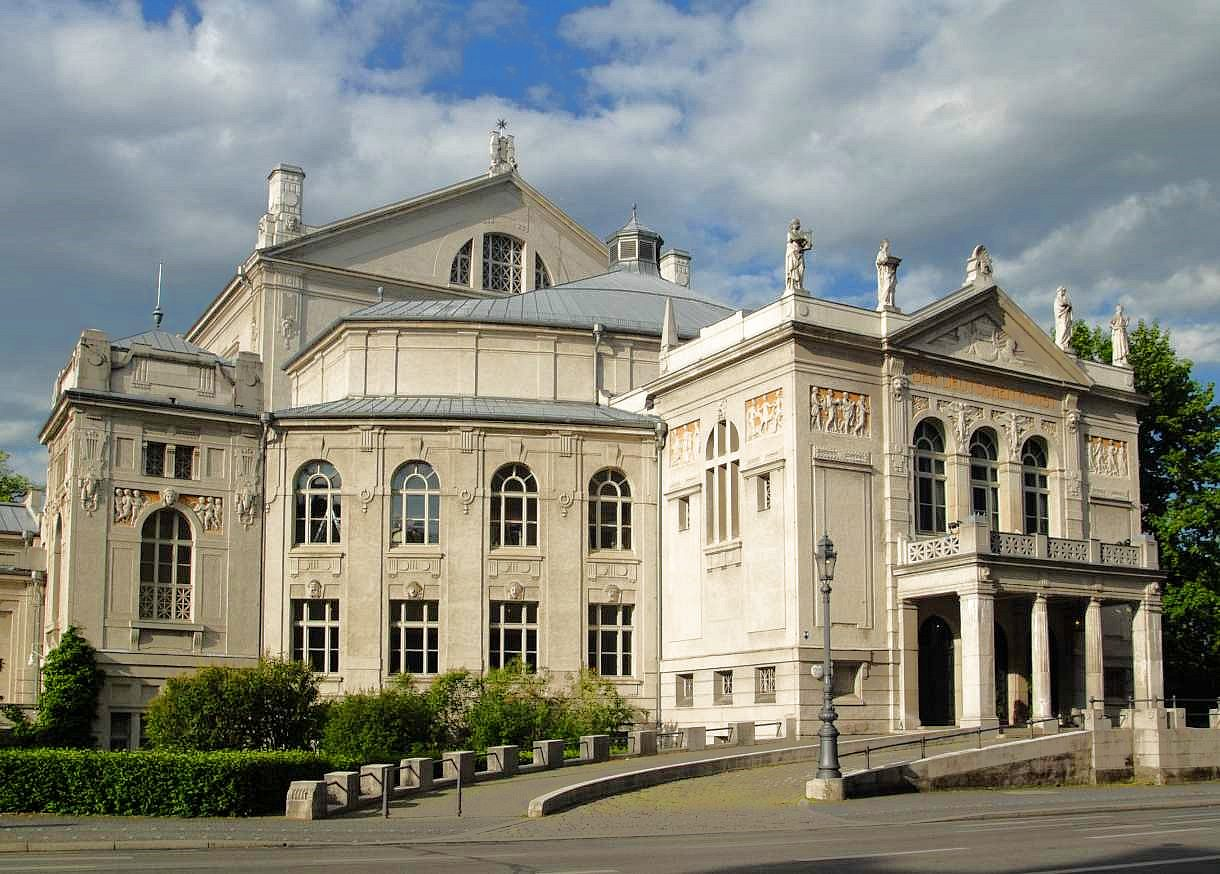
Prinzregententheater

The Prinzregententheater, or, as it was called in its first decades, the Prinz-Regenten-Theater, in English the Prince Regent Theatre, is a concert hall and opera house on Prinzregentenplatz in the Bavarian capital of Munich, Germany.

== Building and History ==
Initiated by Ernst von Possart, the theatre was built in the Prinzregentenstrasse as a festival hall for the operas of Richard Wagner near an area where a similar project of King Ludwig II had failed some decades before. Named after Luitpold, Prince Regent of Bavaria, the building was designed by Max Littmann and opened 21 August 1901 with a production of Die Meistersinger von Nürnberg by Richard Wagner. Like the Bayreuth Festspielhaus, the auditorium was designed to Wagner's specifications, but an amphitheater has replaced the loges.

After the destruction of the Nationaltheater during World War II, the Prinzregententheater housed the Bavarian State Opera from 1944 to 1963 even though it also suffered damage during the war which was not repaired until 1958. Since its renovation in 1988, the Prinzregententheater, with 1122 seats, has served also for the Bavarian Staatsschauspiel and now houses the Bavarian Theatre Academy founded by August Everding. Another theatre in the building, the Akademietheater or Academy Theatre, seats 300.

=== Some famous world premieres ===
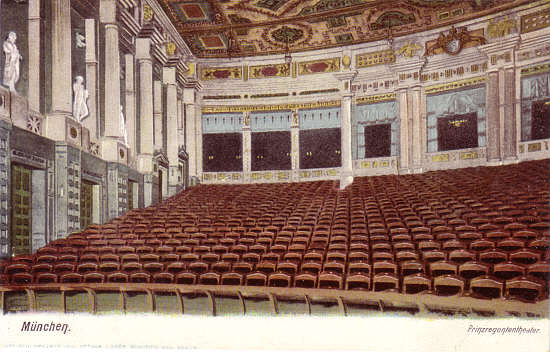
Prinzregententheater, ca. 1910

- 12 June 1917, Palestrina by Hans Pfitzner
- 27 March 1952, Weg zum Licht ballet by Victor Gsovsky with music by Georges Auric
- 22 July 1952, ballet Pas de cœur by Victor Gsovsky / Gottfried von Einem
- 25 February 1954, new edition of Die Bernauerin, by Carl Orff
- 29 March 1956, Don Juan de Manara by Henri Tomasi
- 11 August 1957, Die Harmonie der Welt by Paul Hindemith
- 16 February 1960, ballet Danza by Heinz Rosen / Werner Egk
- 1961, ballet La Buffonata by Heinz Rosen / Wilhelm Killmayer
