= Jini Dinshaw =

Jini Dinshaw (9 August 1930 – 23 October 2025) was an Indian violinist, music pedagogue, and the founder of the Bombay Chamber Orchestra (BCO), India's oldest active indigenous Western classical orchestra. For over sixty years, she contributed to the training, performance, and promotion of Western classical music in Mumbai.

== Early life and education ==
Born on 9 August 1930 as the youngest of eight children in a Parsi family, Dinshaw was the daughter of businessman Dinshaw Dhunjibhoy Mistry. Although her father initially wanted her to become a doctor, leading her to briefly join science studies at St. Xavier's College, she was determined to pursue music. In 1947, at age 17, she moved to London to study the violin under Gladys Noon.

During her 13 years in England, she earned diplomas from both the Royal School of Music and the Royal College of Music. To support herself while studying, she performed household chores for her teacher for pocket money. She returned to Bombay in 1960 at the request of her ailing mother.

== Career ==
Upon her return to India, Dinshaw observed a vacuum in the city's musical life following the closure of the Bombay Symphony Orchestra and the Bombay Philharmonia. In 1962, she established the Bombay Chamber Orchestra (BCO) to provide a platform for young Indian musicians to learn orchestral repertoire beyond basic examination pieces.

As a founder trustee, Dinshaw worked to make the BCO a self-sufficient ensemble, often training various sections herself. The orchestra became a major cultural institution in Mumbai, staging several concerts annually at venues such as the National Centre for the Performing Arts, Sophia Bhabha Hall, and Prithvi Theatre. Under her leadership, the BCO collaborated with international guest conductors and Indian classical soloists, including Amjad Ali Khan and Vilayat Khan. In 1985, the orchestra provided the live music for India's first live ballet performance, a production of Giselle featuring Britain's Royal Ballet Company.

== Pedagogy and mentorship ==
Dinshaw was a teacher of the violin, viola, and cello. Her commitment to filling gaps in the orchestra led her to learn the cello in Switzerland during the 1970s specifically so she could return to India and train new cellists.

She was also a pioneer of the Orff method in India, having studied the technique in Salzburg, Austria, between 1969 and 1970. These classes used music, movement, speech and drama to give children a foundation in rhythm and melody. Known for her philanthropy, Dinshaw frequently taught underprivileged students for free and loaned them instruments. She continued to conduct music lessons until the age of 92.

== Recognition ==
She was awarded the Member of the Order of the British Empire (MBE) by Elizabeth II for her services to music.

== Personal life and death ==
Dinshaw remained unmarried throughout her life, often remarking that she was "married to her music". She died at her home in Mumbai on 23 October 2025 at the age of 95, just four days after the death of her 100-year-old sister, Aloo.
