= Carl Orff =

German composer (1895–1982)

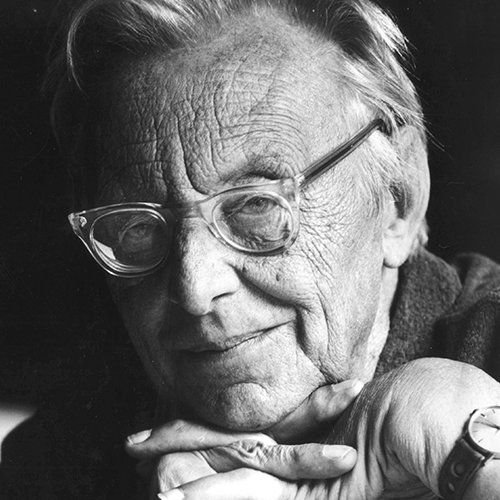
- Orff c. 1970
- Born: 10 July 1895; Munich, Kingdom of Bavaria, German Empire
- Died: 29 March 1982 (aged 86); Munich, Bavaria, West Germany
- Occupations: Composer; music educator
- Known for: Carmina Burana
- Works: List of compositions
- Spouses: Alice Solscher (m. 1920; div. 1927); Gertrud Willert (m. 1939; div. 1953); Luise Rinser (m. 1954; div. 1959); Liselotte Schmitz (m. 1960)
- Children: Godela Orff-Büchtemann (1921–2013)
- Relatives: Alwin Seifert (brother-in-law); Carl Maximilian von Orff (grandfather); Emilia Giehrl (great-aunt); Joseph Aschenbrenner (great-grandfather)

Carl Heinrich Maria Orff (German: [kaʁl ˈʔɔʁf]; 10 July 1895 – 29 March 1982) was a German composer and music educator who is best known for composing the cantata Carmina Burana and formulating concepts of his Schulwerk (lit. 'schoolwork'), which became influential for children's music education.

Born in Munich, Orff was raised in a military family that was scholarly and musical, and later attended the Munich Academy of Music. After composing a number of Lieder and other orchestral works, he completed his Carmina Burana for voices and large orchestra in 1936, setting poems from the medieval poetry collection of the same name. Its première was an immediate great success and Orff considered it the first time he had done exactly what he wanted, although he did not have his previous works destroyed as sometimes claimed. While the cantata was initially hampered by a small group of critics and officials, its popularity dramatically rose throughout and after World War II. Orff never received nearly as much recognition or attention for his later works, like the latter two parts of his triptych Trionfi, of which Carmina Burana is the first installment.

Orff was also an influential pedagogue who, along with colleagues like Gunild Keetman, developed an approach (the "Orff Schulwerk") to teaching children, which is a collection of fundamental principles to ensure every child learns music, much like a new language, in a comfortable environment. It involves tools like elementary forms of instruments and specifically composed music (the original form of the Schulwerk).

A member of the Reichsmusikkammer but not the Nazi Party, Orff's relationship with the Third Reich has been analysed by many as he was considerably successful (musically and financially) under its rule, and his work was well-liked by contemporary critics. Having concealed his part-Jewish ancestry throughout his life, Orff underwent denazification and was rated "'Grey C', acceptable" by psychiatrist Bertram Schaffner, who characterized him as a passive anti-Nazi. He was granted an unrestricted license with no further prohibitions from public musical activities, and continued to compose stage works and rework previous compositions until his death in 1982.

== Life ==
=== Early life ===
Carl Heinrich Maria Orff was born in Munich on 10 July 1895, the son of Paula Orff (née Köstler; 1872–1960) and Heinrich Orff (1869–1949). His family was Bavarian and was active in the Imperial German Army; his father was an army officer with strong musical interests, and his mother was a trained pianist. His grandfathers, Carl Maximilian von Orff (1828–1905) and Karl Köstler (1837–1924), were both major generals and also scholars. His paternal grandmother, Fanny Orff (née Kraft; 1833–1919), was the daughter of Jews who had converted to Catholicism before her birth, Heinrich Kraft (1784–1866) and Barbara Kraft (née Neustädtl, 1797–1872). His maternal grandmother was Maria Köstler (née Aschenbrenner; 1845–1906). Orff had one sibling, his younger sister Maria ("Mia", 1898–1975), who married the architect Alwin Seifert (1890–1972) in 1924.

Despite his family's military background, Orff recalled in 1970: "In my father's house there was certainly more music making than drilling." At age five, he began to play piano, and later studied cello and organ. He composed a few songs and music for puppet plays. He had two vignettes published in July 1905 in Das gute Kind, the children's supplement to Die katholische Familie. He began attending concerts in 1903 and heard his first opera (Richard Wagner's The Flying Dutchman) in 1909. The formative concerts he attended included the world premiere of Gustav Mahler's Das Lied von der Erde in 1911 and Richard Strauss conducting his opera Elektra on 4 June 1914.

In 1910–12, Orff wrote several dozen Lieder on texts by German poets, including the song set Frühlingslieder (Opus 1, text by Ludwig Uhland) and the song cycle Eliland: Ein Sang von Chiemsee (Opus 12, text by Karl Stieler). The poet whose work he most frequently used was Heinrich Heine; he also chose texts of Walther von der Vogelweide, Princess Mathilde of Bavaria (1877–1906), Friedrich Hölderlin, Ludwig August Frankl, Hermann Lingg, Rudolf Baumbach, Richard Beer-Hofmann, and Börries von Münchhausen, among others. Orff's songs fell into the style of Richard Strauss and other German composers of the day, but with hints of what would become Orff's distinctive musical language. Some of his songs were published in 1912. These include Eliland, with a dedication to Karl Köstler, who funded the publication. (Note: All of these songs were published by Ernst Germann & Co. (Munich/Leipzig). In addition to Eliland, they include "Märchen" (as Opus 13, but in fact Opus 13, No. 3; text by Max Haushofer Jr.), "Des Herzen Slüzzelin" (Opus 15; text by anonymous), "Liebessorgen" and "Drei toskanische Volkslieder" (in one publication, Opus 17 Nos. 1 and 2, respectively; text by Martin Greif and Paul Heyse, respectively), and "Der Tod und die Liebe" (Opus 18, No. 1; text by Münchhausen). Excepting "Der Tod und die Liebe", these songs may be heard on Lieder und Gesänge recorded by WERGO.) In 1911–12, Orff wrote Zarathustra (Opus 14), a large work for baritone voice, three tenor-bass choruses, winds, percussion, harps, pianos, and organ, based on a passage from Friedrich Nietzsche's philosophical novel Also sprach Zarathustra.

Orff studied at the Munich Academy of Music from 1912 until 1914. Orff later wrote that his decision to pursue music studies instead of completing Gymnasium was the source of family strife, as the Orff patriarch (his father's older brother, also named Karl Orff, 1863–1942) was against the idea. Orff had the support of his mother, who persuaded his father, and of his grandfather Köstler. Orff's teacher at the Akademie was the composer Anton Beer-Walbrunn, of whom he later wrote with respect but said that he found the academy overall to be "conservative and old-fashioned" (konservativ und altväterlich). At this time, he studied the works of Arnold Schoenberg, and one of his most important influences at this time was the French composer Claude Debussy. These influences can be heard in his first stage work, the music drama Gisei: Das Opfer (Gisei: The Sacrifice, Opus 20), written in 1913 but not performed until 2010. Orff's source material is a German translation of part of Sugawara Denju Tenarai Kagami, specifically "Terakoya" ("The Village School") in Act IV. In 1914 Orff wrote Tanzende Faune: Ein Orchesterspiel (Opus 21). The work was to be performed at the Akademie – his first performance by an orchestra – but conductor Eberhard Schwickerath removed it from the program following an unsuccessful rehearsal; it was first performed in 1995. In 1915, he began studying piano with Hermann Zilcher. Writing to his father, he called the studies with Zilcher his most productive teacher relationship to date. Around this time he also came to know theater director Otto Falckenberg, and saw plays by August Strindberg and Frank Wedekind.

=== World War I ===
Orff was forced into the German Army in August 1917, which was a great crisis for him. In a letter to his father dated 3 August 1917, he wrote:

My future lies now more than ever completely in the dark. That I [shall] go into the battlefield is absolutely certain. Here the decision should, and will, fall (you know that I am free from sentimentality): either I find an end of everything that has pushed and almost crushed me, or I become a wholly new person and begin in a certain sense entirely new. What must come, should come entirely better as the time that was.

The coming fall, he was severely injured and nearly killed when a trench caved in, suffering amnesia, aphasia, and paralysis of his left-side. During his difficult recovery, he wrote to his father:

I certainly never think of something that looks like the future. ... Since I am in the battlefield, all threads and connections from earlier are torn to shreds. ... For him who has been out here once, it is better (especially in my profession) that he remains out here. When I hear music I get palpitations & fever and it makes me sick; I can't think at all about when I might be able to hear a concert again, let alone make music myself.

After Orff's death in 1982, his daughter wrote that she believed this experience "made him think and rebel yet more revolutionarily."

=== Weimar Republic ===
After recovering from his battle injuries, Orff held various positions at opera houses in Mannheim and Darmstadt, later returning to Munich to pursue his music studies. Around 1920, Orff was drawn to the poetry of Franz Werfel, which became the basis for numerous Lieder and choral compositions. In the mid-1920s, he began to formulate a concept he called elementare Musik, or elemental music, which was based on the unity of the arts symbolized by the ancient Greek Muses, and involved tone, dance, poetry, image, design, and theatrical gesture. Like many other composers of the time, he was influenced by the Russian-French émigré Igor Stravinsky. But while others followed the cool, balanced neoclassic works of Stravinsky, it was works such as Les noces (The Wedding), an earthy, quasi-folkloric depiction of Russian peasant wedding rites, that appealed to Orff.

Orff came to know the work of Bertolt Brecht in 1924, which had a profound influence on him. The same year, he and Dorothee Günther founded the Günther-Schule for gymnastics, music, and dance in Munich. He developed his theories of music education, having constant contact with children and working with musical beginners. In 1930, Orff published a manual titled Schulwerk, in which he shares his method of conducting. He was involved with the Schulwerk and its associated institutions throughout his life, although he retired from the Günther-Schule in 1938.

Orff also began adapting musical works of earlier eras for contemporary theatrical presentation, including Claudio Monteverdi and Alessandro Striggio's opera L'Orfeo (1607). Orff's shortened German version (with Günther's translation), Orpheus, was staged under his direction in 1925 in Mannheim, using some of the instruments that had been used in the original 1607 performance, although several of these were unavailable and had to be replaced. Orff revised the score a few years later; this version was first performed in Munich in 1929. Orff's adaptations of early music brought him very little money. The passionately declaimed opera of Monteverdi's era was almost unknown in the 1920s, and Orff's production met with reactions ranging from incomprehension to ridicule. He told his mentor Curt Sachs, who had led him to study Monteverdi and supported his Orpheus, that the Munich press was against him: "I am made out to be not only a violator of corpses (see Monteverdi), but also a youth-seducer, who systematically corrupts our good youth with exotic perversities."

=== Nazi era ===
Orff's relationship with German National Socialism and the Nazi Party has been a matter of considerable debate and analysis, sometimes colored by misinformation. Historian Michael H. Kater, nevertheless wrote that "Carl Orff's name to many has become synonymous with fascist art and culture, frequently by way of a rather cavalier prejudgment" but also that Orff "thoroughly disliked most of the things that National Socialism and the Third Reich came to stand for, before and after Hitler's takeover".

Orff accepted several commissions from the Nazis: his Einzug und Reigen der Kinder was performed at the opening of the 1936 Summer Olympics in Berlin. In 1939, on commission from the city of Frankfurt, he revised his stage work based on Shakespeare’s A Midsummer Night’s Dream, the first version of which had been published in 1917 and was now intended to replace Ein Sommernachtstraum music by Felix Mendelssohn Bartholdy, a composer who had been ostracized as Jewish. Baldur von Schirach, who, as Reich Governor in Vienna, developed extensive cultural-political initiatives, engaged him during the war for the Vienna State Opera and commissioned the opera Antigonae. From 1941 to 1945, Orff received a fixed monthly salary from Vienna for his work, which made him financially independent for the first time in his career. Among the works performed at the State Opera during this period was Carmina Burana. In 1944, Orff was named by Hitler on the “Gottbegnadeten list”, which exempted him from military service and labor duties on the home front—because of “German cultural heritage” the Nazis deemed worthy of protection.

Orff never joined the Party, nor did he have any leadership position with the Third Reich. He was a member of the Reichsmusikkammer, which was required of active musicians in the Third Reich.

Several of Orff's friends and associates went into exile between 1933 and 1939, including Sachs and Leo Kestenberg, the latter of whom was an advocate for his Schulwerk. Orff reconnected with several of these exiled colleagues after the war and in some cases maintained lifelong friendships, as with singer and composer Karel Salmon, who emigrated within the first few months of the Nazi takeover. Another such figure is the art historian Albin von Prybram-Gladona (1890–1974), whose parents had converted from Judaism before his birth and who survived multiple incarcerations in concentration camps after he fled to France. Prybram-Gladona testified to Orff's character during the denazification process. Another important friend to Orff was the German-Jewish musicologist and composer Erich Katz (1900–1973), who fled in 1939 after temporary incarceration in Dachau. Orff reestablished contact with Katz in 1952, and Katz considered Orff a valued friend. Orff wrote a tribute upon Katz's death in the form of a letter addressed to the deceased.

==== Carmina Burana ====
Orff's Carmina Burana had its premiere in Frankfurt on 8 June 1937. It became very popular in Nazi Germany over the next few years. Historian Michael H. Kater wrote that "by 1945" it "[stood] out as the single universally important work produced during the entire span of the Third Reich". Oliver Rathkolb, however, has noted that subsequent popular perception has exaggerated the degree of its importance to the culture of the Third Reich, as numerous other works received more stagings. Given Orff's previous lack of commercial success, the monetary gains from Carmina Burana's acclaim, including a 500 RM award from the city of Frankfurt, were significant to him but the composition, with its unfamiliar rhythms, was also denounced with racist taunts.

==== Ein Sommernachtstraum ====
Orff was one of numerous German composers under the Nazi regime who wrote new incidental music for Shakespeare's A Midsummer Night's Dream – in German Ein Sommernachtstraum – after Mendelssohn's incidental music for that play had been banned.

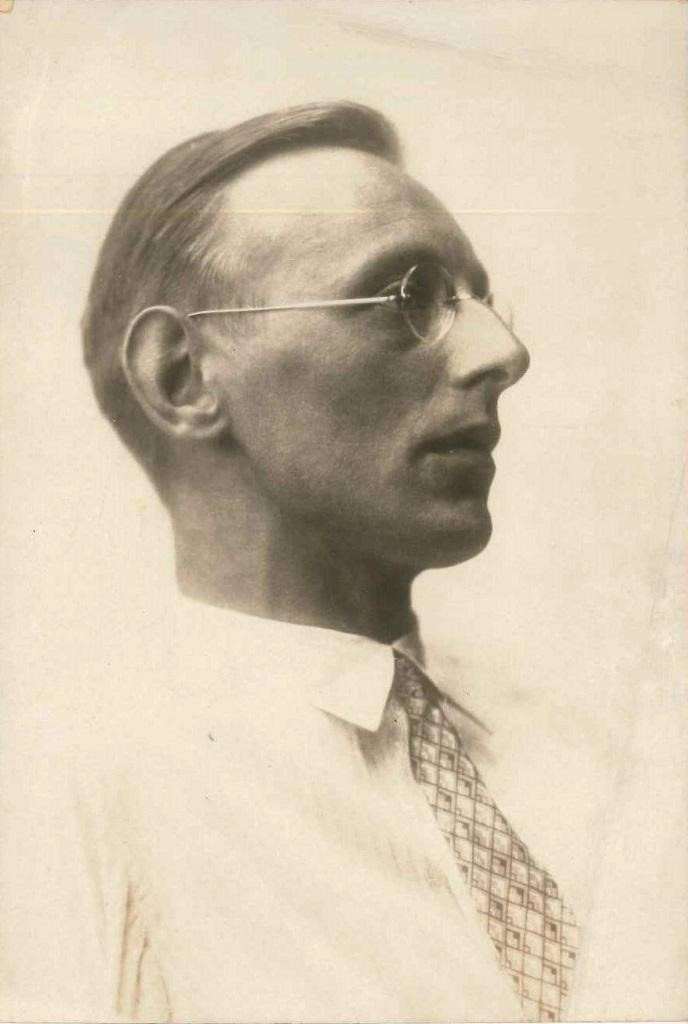
Orff in 1940

Orff's version was first performed on 14 October 1939 in Frankfurt as the result of a commission through that city. By his report, he had already composed music for the play as early as 1917 and 1927, long before the Frankfurt commission; no materials from these earlier (presumably incomplete) versions are extant. Orff's publisher had serious reservations about the project, and Orff's commission was unable to make the original deadline of the commission, resulting in the reduction of his payment from 5,000 RM to 3,000 RM. He later called the 1939 iteration "a compromised (unfortunately printed) version. In place of the small onstage ensemble there was again a normal small opera orchestra, no more magical percussion, all inexcusable concessions." The composer's discontent, together with his initial difficulties in composition, sometimes has been interpreted at least in part as due to pangs of conscience. Thomas Rösch has written of this project: "The autonomy of art, which Orff always held highly, was only more illusion within the dictatorship – and the insistence of the composer on a purely artistic, aesthetic viewpoint inevitably changed under this condition to a momentous error."

Orff went on to rework his Ein Sommernachtstraum score three times. The next version was to have its premiere on 10 September 1944, but the closure of all theaters in dire wartime conditions prevented it from occurring. In December 1945, Orff expressed hope for a performance in Stuttgart, but when Gottfried von Einem asked him in 1946 about a premiere of this version at the Salzburg Festival, he demurred and responded defensively when Einem asked if the work had been a commission from the Third Reich. Orff made further revisions still, and this version was first performed on 30 October 1952 in Darmstadt. It also had an American premiere by Leopold Stokowski at the Empire State Music Festival on 19 July 1956. Orff revised the score yet again in 1962; this final version had its first performance on in Stuttgart on 12 March 1964.

==== Relationship with Kurt Huber ====
Orff was a friend of Kurt Huber (1893–1943), a professor at the Ludwig-Maximilians-Universität München (LMU), with whom he worked since 1934 on Bavarian folk music. Together with Orff's Schulwerk associate Hans Bergese (1910–2000), they published two volumes of folk music as Musik der Landschaft: Volksmusik in neuen Sätzen in 1942.

In December 1942, Huber became a member of the student resistance movement Weiße Rose (the White Rose). He was arrested on 27 February 1943, condemned to death by the Volksgerichtshof, and executed by the Nazis on 13 July 1943. By happenstance, Orff called at Huber's house on the day after his arrest. Huber's distraught wife, Clara (née Schlickenrieder; 1908–1998), hoped Orff would use his influence to help her husband, but Orff panicked upon learning of Kurt Huber's arrest, fearing that he was "ruined" (ruiniert). Clara Huber later said she never saw Orff again, but there is documentary evidence that they had further contact. On at least one occasion, she recalled that Orff had attempted to help her husband through Baldur von Schirach (the highest-ranking Nazi official with whom he came into contact, and whom he met at least twice), for which no further evidence has been found. In June 1949, Orff transferred his rights to Musik der Landschaft to Huber's family. Shortly after the war, Clara Huber asked Orff to contribute to a memorial volume for her husband; he contributed an emotional letter written directly to Kurt Huber, similar to what he did for Katz years later. Orff's Die Bernauerin, a project which he completed in 1946 and which he had discussed with Huber before the latter's execution, is dedicated to Huber's memory. The final scene of this work, which is about the wrongful execution of Agnes Bernauer, depicts a guilt-ridden chorus begging not to be implicated in the title character's death.

==== Denazification ====
In late March 1946, Orff underwent a denazification process in Bad Homburg at a psychological screening center of the Information Control Division (ICD), a department of the Office of Military Government, United States (OMGUS). Orff was rated "Grey C, acceptable", which his evaluator Bertram Schaffner (1912–2010) defined as for those "compromised by their actions during the Nazi period but not subscribers to Nazi doctrine". (Note: Documents pertaining to Orff's denazification, including the official report by Schaffner, are printed in Rathkolb 2021, pp. 236–254 and Kohler 2015, pp. 415–435. The materials from Orff's evaluation are held in the Oskar Diethelm Library, DeWitt Wallace Institute for the History of Psychiatry, Weill Cornell Medical College, New York City, David M. Levy Papers, Box 35, Folder 2 (Schaffner's report) and Folder 40 (Orff's Rorschach test).)

Some sources report that Orff had been blacklisted before the evaluation, which would have prevented him from collecting royalties on his compositions. According to more recent research by Oliver Rathkolb, there is no evidence to support this. In January 1946, American officer Newell Jenkins (1915–1996) – Orff's former student (with whom he used the informal du), who went on to have a career as a conductor – informed him that he did not need a license as a composer if he was not seeking to conduct, teach, or otherwise appear in public. Jenkins, however, hoped that Orff would take an Intendant position in Stuttgart, which Orff was considering after initially saying no. This would require evaluation, and thus Jenkins encouraged Orff to think of how he could prove that he had actively resisted Nazism, as such persons were most highly valued. Orff turned down the Stuttgart position by early March 1946, but Jenkins still insisted Orff undergo an evaluation at the end of that month. Schaffner's report notes: "Orff does not wish a license as 'Intendant' of an opera-house, and states that he has already refused such an offer, because the work would be primarily administrative and not musical. He wishes to have permission to appear as guest-conductor." Orff was granted a license without any restrictions despite his rating of "'Grey C', acceptable", but there is no evidence that he conducted in public after the war.

Schaffner believed that the root causes of Nazism included an underlying societal rigidity and authoritarianism in Germany, especially as they pertained to fathers in family life and institutions such as the school and the military. His theories informed his and his colleagues' denazification evaluations. In his report on Orff, Schaffner wrote:

O[rff]'s attitudes are not Nazi. One of his best friends, Prof. Carl [sic] Huber, with whom he published Musik der Landschaft, a collection of folk songs, was killed by the Nazis in Munich in 1943. Nevertheless he was a Nutzniesser [i.e., beneficiary] of the Nazis and can at present be classified only as "Grey C", acceptable. In view of his antinazi point of view, his deliberate av[o]idance of positions and honors which he could have had by cooperating with the Nazis, he may at a future date be reclassified higher.

There is no evidence that Orff was ever reclassified, but since his license had no restrictions, this was not necessary. For Orff's psychological evaluation, Schaffner wrote:

1. A highly gifted, creative individual who scored high on intelligence tests ... Orff is diplomatic, ingratiating and ingenious. Retiring and unob[tr]usive, accustomed to independence and solitude since childhood, he has steadfastly pursued his career as an unattached composer. He has little personal need of "belonging" to a group, public honor or recognition, and prefers to work alone rather than in organizations. He is emotionally well-adjusted, purposeful and egocentric.

2. Orff scored highest in his group on the political attitudes test. Psychiatric studies of his environment and development are consistent with an antinazi att[i]tude. On psychological grounds, [N]azism was distasteful to him; likewise on psychological grounds, he remained a passive antinazi, and tried to avoid official and personal contact bot[h] with the Nazi movement and with the war.

Some scholars have maintained that Orff deceived his evaluators to some degree. The counterpoint is that Orff misrepresented himself in some instances, but the Americans had enough information to assess him fundamentally correctly and rate him accordingly. The report notes some of Orff's financial support from the cities of Frankfurt and Vienna, his participation in the 1936 Summer Olympics, and the music for A Midsummer Night's Dream (although the number of its performances was undercounted), which Orff said he wrote "from his own private musical point of view" but "admit[ted] that he chose an unfortunate moment in history to write it."

Orff said "that he never got a favorable review by a Nazi music critic"; however, his work had been enthusiastically received by audiences and many critics. He also said that "[h]is great success" was in 1942 with a performance of Carmina Burana in La Scala in Milan, "not under the auspices of the Propaganda Ministry." In fact, Orff later publicly characterized the second staging of Carmina Burana, which took place in Dresden on 4 October 1940, as the beginning of his great success. The American evaluators disbelieved Orff's account of his reception in the Third Reich: "The fact that he was deferred ... during the war is contradictory to his claim that he was not well thought of at the Propaganda Ministry. ... He does not give a very good [e]xplanation." The report likewise notes Orff's very sharp rise in income in the latter part of the Third Reich.

Surprisingly absent from the report are several factors that Orff could have used in his favor, notably his associations with Jewish colleagues as well as his own partly Jewish ancestry, the latter of which was never publicly known while he was alive. Nor is there any mention of the potentially subversive and anti-authoritarian texts in his works, notably the passages in Die Kluge (premiere 1943) that have been identified as such, sometimes even during Orff's lifetime (including by Carl Dahlhaus).

==== White Rose controversy ====
According to Michael Kater, Orff cleared his name during the denazification period by claiming that he had helped establish the White Rose resistance movement in Germany. Kater also made a particularly strong case that Orff collaborated with Nazi German authorities. The source for the White Rose claim was a 1993 interview with Jenkins. Kater described his finding as "nothing less than sensational" (nichts weniger als sensationell). The episode was the source of considerable strife. The controversy elicited objections from two people who had known Orff in their youth during the Third Reich, one of whom recalled that Jenkins had been trying to portray Orff as a "resistance fighter" (Widerstandskämpfer) and thus believed that Jenkins had been the source of the alleged legend.

A few years later, Viennese historian Oliver Rathkolb discovered Orff's denazification file, which was distributed to reporters in a press conference at the Orff-Zentrum München on 10 February 1999. In this document, there is no claim about being in the White Rose. There is, however, a reference to Orff's relationship with Huber (see quoted passage under "Denazification"). Orff told Fred K. Prieberg in 1963 that he was afraid of being arrested as an associate of Huber, but made no claim that he had been involved in the White Rose himself. In 1960, Orff had described similar fears to an interviewer but explicitly said that he was not a part of the resistance himself.

Kater's accusation, as he termed it, regarding the White Rose colored much of the discourse on Carl Orff in the coming years. In some instances the debate focused more on acrimony between those involved. In Composers of the Nazi Era: Eight Portraits (2000), Kater qualified his earlier accusations to some extent after reviewing the documents that Rathkolb discovered. Subsequently, however, Kater reiterated his initial claim regarding Orff and the White Rose without any reference to the denazification file.

While Kater's account has been accepted by some scholars who have investigated the matter further, Rathkolb and others have examined the theory that Orff lied about being a member of the resistance and found insufficient evidence to believe it, noting there is no solid corroboration outside of Kater's interview with Jenkins. Rathkolb concluded: "That it [i.e., Kater's finding] is based on the interpretation of an oral-history source without seeking or receiving further sources makes it a construction that is based on a scholarly untenable working method." Writing in 2021, Siegfried Göllner was not convinced that the allegation about the White Rose lie had been refuted as unambiguously as he felt Rathkolb and Thomas Rösch had claimed, but "since the episode about the White Rose was never on the record or issued openly by Orff, it is ultimately irrelevant whether the episode reported by Jenkins to Kater actually took place or was a matter of misunderstanding. ... Kater in any case attached too much significance to the statement of Jenkins." In 1999, at the height of the controversy, musicologist Reinhard Schulz described the affair as a "scholarly cockfight" (wissenschaftlichen Hahnenkampfes), adding: "Far more important than a single fact would be an understanding of [the] connection" to Orff's life and creativity.

=== Personal life ===
Carl Orff was very guarded as to his personal life. When asked by the theater scholar Carl Niessen to provide a handwritten entry for a collection of autobiographies of German composers of the day, for which some of his colleagues wrote as many as three pages, he sent only: "Carl Orff[,] born 1895 in Munich[,] living there" (Carl Orff[,] geboren 1895 in München[,] lebt daselbst).

Orff was married four times and had three divorces. His first marriage was in 1920 to the singer Alice Solscher (1891–1970). Orff's only child, Godela Orff-Büchtemann (1921–2013) was born on 21 February 1921. The couple separated about six months after Godela's birth and were divorced officially in 1927. Godela remained with her father when her mother moved to Melbourne to pursue her career around 1930. In 1939, Orff married Gertrud Willert (1914–2000), who had been his student and who founded a method of music therapy using the Orff-Schulwerk; they divorced in 1953. By 1952, he began a relationship with author Luise Rinser (1911–2002), whom he married in 1954. In 1955, they moved from Munich to Dießen am Ammersee. Their marriage was troubled and ended in divorce in 1959, by which time Orff was living with the person who would become his next wife. Orff's final marriage, which lasted to the end of his life, was with Liselotte Schmitz (1930–2012), who had been his secretary, and who after his death carried on his legacy in her capacity with the Carl-Orff Stiftung. They married in Andechs on 10 May 1960.

Born to devout Roman Catholic parents, Orff broke from religious dogma at a young age. His daughter tied his break from the church to the suicide of a classmate, and she reported that he did not have her baptized. Gertrud Orff said that "he never went to church; to the contrary. It was probably the time of inner rebellion against things like that. ... He was a religious person, yes. But not a person of the church." Nevertheless, he wanted to be buried in the Baroque church of the beer-brewing Benedictine priory of Andechs, southwest of Munich; he could see this monastery from his home in Dießen.

Orff had no desire to follow in his family's military tradition, even as a child. He later wrote: "My father [Heinrich Orff] knew that everything soldierly lay far from me and that I could not warm up to it." According to Godela Orff, the composer's parents "nevertheless always remained lovingly inclined toward him, even when his way of life did not meet their expectations", and Orff and his sister "were watched over and supported with loving tolerance." She also wrote that her father's mother, Paula Orff, always fostered her son's creativity and gave him "the gift of inspiration". Orff himself wrote of his mother: "From time immemorial I was a real mother's boy. In life's serious and most difficult situations she understood me deeply with her heart, even if her ideas, strongly set in tradition, stood in the way of it." Paula Orff died on 22 July 1960, after which Orff's colleague Karl Amadeus Hartmann wrote to him: "I know how intimately bonded you were with your mother, similar to me with mine, and can therefore especially sympathize with the entire gravity of the loss."

Godela Orff described her relationship with her father as having been difficult at times. "He had his life and that was that", she tells Tony Palmer in the documentary O Fortuna. Their relationship became especially strained in the late 1940s; they reconciled around the early 1970s.

=== Death ===
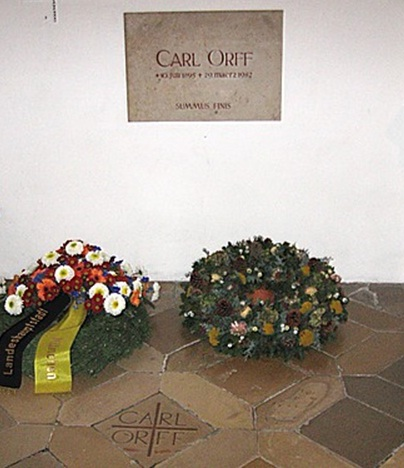
Orff's grave at the Andechs Abbey church

Orff died of cancer in Munich on 29 March 1982, at the age of 86. He is buried in the Andechs Abbey. His tombstone bears the Latin inscription Summus Finis (the Ultimate End), taken from the end of his last work, De temporum fine comoedia.

== Works ==
=== Carmina Burana ===
Orff is best known for Carmina Burana (1936), a "scenic cantata". It is the first part of a trilogy that also includes Catulli Carmina and Trionfo di Afrodite. Carmina Burana reflects his interest in medieval German poetry. The trilogy as a whole is called Trionfi, or "Triumphs". The work is based on thirteenth-century poetry found in a manuscript dubbed the Codex latinus monacensis found in the Benedictine monastery of Benediktbeuern in 1803 and written by the Goliards; this collection is also known as Carmina Burana. While "modern" in some of his compositional techniques, Orff was able to capture the spirit of the medieval period in this trilogy. The medieval poems, written in Latin and an early form of German, are a lament about the cruel indifference of fate (the brief opening and closing sections of Orff's work are titled "Fortuna Imperatrix Mundi", i.e., "Fortune, Ruler of the World"). The chorus that opens and concludes Carmina Burana, "O Fortuna", is often used to denote primal forces, for example in the Oliver Stone film The Doors. The work's association with fascism also led Pier Paolo Pasolini to use the movement "Veris leta facies" to accompany the concluding scenes of torture and murder in his final film Salò, or the 120 Days of Sodom. Pasolini was concerned with the question of art being appropriated by power when he made the film, which has relevance to Orff's situation.

=== Relationship to pre-Carmina Burana works ===
Orff often said that, following a dress rehearsal for Carmina Burana, he told his publisher the following: "Everything that I have written up until now and that you, unfortunately, have printed you now can pulp. With Carmina Burana begins my collected works." (Note: For two of the earliest known instances of this account appearing in print, see Liess, Andreas (1955). Carl Orff: Idee und Werk (in German). Zürich: Atlantis Verlag. p. 27.. The same year as this publication (which Orff himself authorized), Everett Helm wrote: "In 1937 Carmina Burana was performed for the first time and with great success in Frankfurt am Main, and at that moment Orff 'disowned' all his previous work, with which he was now dissatisfied. Two pieces, Catulli Carmina and the Entrata, were later revised and restored to grace, as were the Monteverdi arrangements. For all practical purposes, then, Carmina Burana must be regarded as his earliest work, and it has remained one of his most successful." Helm, Everett (July 1955). "Carl Orff". The Musical Quarterly. XLI (3): 286 (285–304). doi:10.1093/mq/XLI.3.285.. Note that the 1943 stage work Catulli Carmina uses six of the seven earlier Catulli Carmina I a cappella choruses, but the majority of its material is newly composed.) Michael H. Kater has called this statement into question, citing a lack of documentary evidence and the continuation of performances of Orff's previous works after the premiere of Carmina Burana, although in fact most of these performances used revised versions. Orff eventually qualified his oft-repeated statement: "So I had said this thoughtlessly, con leggerezza [i.e. "lightly"]: a remark that, as I well knew, was true and also not true. I only wanted to accentuate with it the meaning that the Carmina Burana held in my creations up to that point, as was clear to me myself." When asked about the quotation in 1975, Orff replied: "For the first time I had done exactly what I wanted, and I also knew that I had treated it right. Really there is nothing more to say." Orff went on to revise many of his earlier works, and later in his career he reissued some of his pre-Carmina Burana compositions with minimal revisions. One of his final publications was a volume of songs he had composed between 1911 and 1920.

=== After World War II ===
Most of Orff's later works – Antigonae (1949), Oedipus der Tyrann (Oedipus the Tyrant, 1959), Prometheus desmotes (Prometheus Bound, 1968), and De temporum fine comoedia (Play on the End of Times, 1973) – were based on texts or topics from antiquity. They extend the language of Carmina Burana in interesting ways, but they are expensive to stage and (on Orff's own characterization) are not operas in the conventional sense. Live performances of them have been few, even in Germany.

In a letter dated 8 January 1947 to his student Heinrich Sutermeister, Orff called Die Bernauerin "the last piece in the series of my earlier work; Antigonae starts a new phase." Antigonae is a setting of Friedrich Hölderlin's translation of the play by Sophocles. Orff first became interested in this source material shortly after his trauma in World War I and began planning his work late in 1940. The premiere took place on 9 August 1949 at the Salzburg Festival. Orff followed Antigonae with Oedipus der Tyrann, also using Hölderlin's translation of Sophocles's play, and Prometheus, using the original language of the Greek play attributed to Aeschylus. Their premieres took place in Stuttgart, respectively in 1959 and 1968, conducted by Ferdinand Leitner. All three of the Greek tragedies make no cuts or alterations to the texts.

The Greek tragedies are scored for highly unusual ensembles centered on large percussion ensembles, which include non-Western instruments and numerous mallet instruments (including lithophone), and several pianos (four in Prometheus and six in the other two); the traditional string section is dispensed with excepting nine contrabasses. They also have six flutes and six oboes (with various auxiliary doublings of piccolo, alto flute, and English horn), as well as trumpets (six in Antigonae and Prometheus; eight in Oedipus der Tyrann, behind the scene). Oedipus der Tyrann and Prometheus also have six trombones and organ. All three works also have four harps; there is additionally mandolin in Oedipus der Tyrann and four tenor banjos in Prometheus.

Following the premiere of Prometheus, Everett Helm wrote:

Orff does not make things easy for either singers or audience. But the retention of the original text undoubtedly evoked a mood such as could not have been created by a modern language.

"Prometheus" is not an opera in the usual sense. Like other works by Orff, it is music theater in which the music is part of, and subordinated to, the dramatic whole. The voices declaim almost constantly – either in spoken rhythm or in a kind of psalmodic recitative. Only occasionally (and most effectively) does the stark psalmody give way to melismas that recall the more florid passages of Gregorian chant. There is no semblance of arias or concerted numbers.

... Brief interludes in the orchestra have the character of interjections. There is no development, either musical or psychological. The huge blocks of sound produce a static, immobile form and atmosphere ... The makeup of the orchestra ... produces, hard, metallic sounds, mercilessly driven by primitive ostinato rhythms. The whole effect is elemental to a degree, but in no sense naive. Orff's stylized primitivism masks a high degree of sophistication.

Orff's final work for the stage, De temporum fine comoedia (Play on the End of Times), had its premiere at the Salzburg Festival on 20 August 1973, performed by Herbert von Karajan and the WDR Symphony Orchestra Cologne and Chorus. It has a large cast and similar scoring to the Greek tragedies with some exceptions, notably clarinetists (all with E-flat clarinets) instead of oboists and the addition of contrabassoon, horns, and tuba. Thomas Rösch has called this work "in many respects the summation of [Orff's] entire work." There is no evidence Orff considered writing another stage work after De temporum fine comoedia, and in 1979 he told an interviewer he was certain it was the end (Schluß) of his composition. In this highly personal work, Orff presented a mystery play, sung in Greek, German, and Latin, in which he summarized his view of the end of time. His philosophy draws from many religious traditions, primarily Origen's idea of apocatastasis. De temporum fine comoedia also makes numerous references to Orff's previous compositions, notably Die Bernauerin. Around the time of the premiere, he said that his works are "as with an onion: one layer follows the others." On the same occasion, he said of De temporum fine comoedia: "It is all a dream, only a fantasy. Pessimistic, optimistic, as anyone wants."

=== Pedagogic works ===
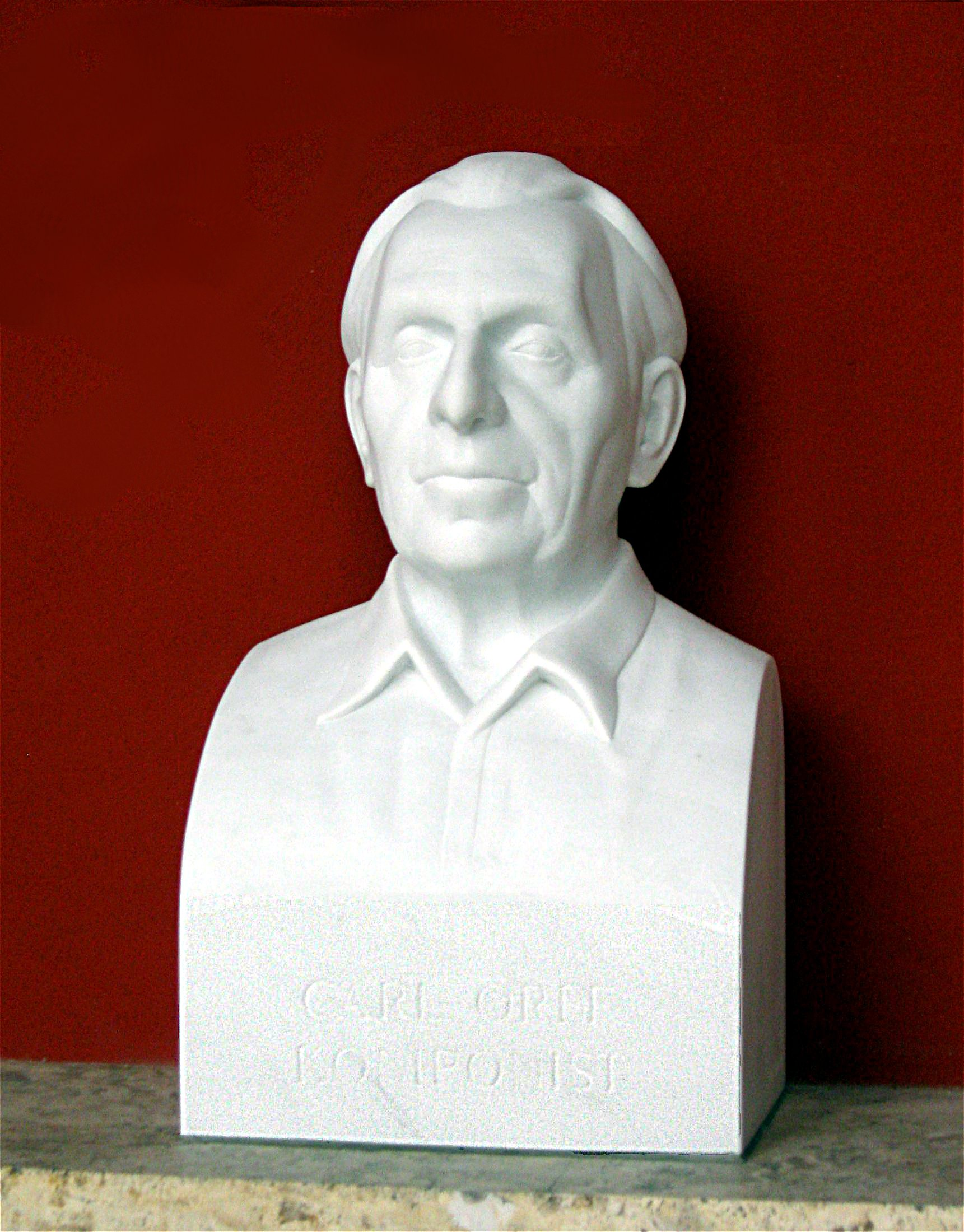
Bust of Carl Orff in the Munich Hall of Fame (2009)

In pedagogical circles he is probably best remembered for his Schulwerk ("School Work"). Originally a set of pieces composed and published for the Güntherschule (which had students ranging from 12 to 22), this title was also used for his books based on radio broadcasts in Bavaria in 1949. These pieces are collectively called Musik für Kinder (Music for Children), and also use the term Schulwerk, and were written in collaboration with his former pupil, composer and educator Gunild Keetman (1904–1990), who actually wrote most of the settings and arrangements in the "Musik für Kinder" ("Music for Children") volumes.

Orff's ideas were developed, together with Gunild Keetman, into a very innovative approach to music education for children, known as the Orff Schulwerk. The music is elemental and combines movement, singing, playing, and improvisation.

Gassenhauer, Hexeneinmaleins, and Passion, which Orff composed with Keetman, were used as theme music for Terrence Malick's film Badlands (1973).

== List of compositions ==
Carl Orff's publisher is Schott Music.

=== I. Concert and stage works (Note: Excepting where otherwise noted, information for dates according to Orff-Zentrum München webpage, https://www.ozm.bayern.de/kuenstlerisches_werk/ (accessed 13 August 2022).) ===
==== Stage works ====
- Gisei: Das Opfer, Opus 20, libretto adapted by Orff from Terakoya, a portion of Sugawara Denju Tenarai Kagami in translation by Karl Florenz (1913, premiere 30 January 2010)
- Incidental music for Georg Büchner's play Leonce und Lena (1918–19), unpublished and only partially extant (manuscript in Orff-Zentrum München)
- Lamenti (first performed as cycle on 15 May 1958)
  - Klage der Ariadne, reshaping of the lament from Claudio Monteverdi and Ottavio Rinuccini's L'Arianna, German text by Orff (1925, premiere 16 April 1925; reworked 1940)
  - Orpheus, reshaping of Claudio Monteverdi and Alessandro Striggio's L'Orfeo, German text by Dorothee Günther (1922–1925, premiere 17 April 1925; reworked 1929 and 1940)
  - Tanz der Spröden, reshaping of Monteverdi and Rinuccini's Il ballo delle ingrate, German text by Günther (1925, premiere 28 December 1925; reworked 1940)
- Trionfi. Trittico teatrale (premiere 14 February 1953)
  - Carmina Burana. Cantiones profanae cantoribus et choris cantandae comitantibus instrumetis atque imaginibus magicis, texts from Carmina Burana codex (1934–1936, premiere 8 June 1937)
  - Catulli Carmina. Ludi scaenici, texts by Orff (Praelusio and Exodium) and Catullus (Actus I–III), incorporating material from Catulli Carmina I choruses (1941–1943, premiere 6 November 1943)
  - Trionfo di Afrodite. Concerto scenico, texts by Sappho, Catullus, and Euripides (1947–1951, premiere 14 February 1953)
- Märchenstücke (Fairy tales)
  - Der Mond, libretto by Orff after the Brothers Grimm (1936–1938, premiere 5 February 1939; reworked 1940, 1942, 1946, 1957, 1970)
  - Die Kluge, libretto by Orff after the Brothers Grimm (1941–1942, premiere 20 February 1943)
  - Ein Sommernachtstraum, incidental music to play by William Shakespeare in translation by August Wilhelm Schlegel (drafts 1917 and 1927–1928; completed version 1938–1939, premiere 14 October 1939; reworked 1943–44 (unperformed); reworked 1952, premiere 30 October 1952; reworked 1962, premiere of final version 12 March 1964)
- Bairisches Welttheater (Bavarian world theatre)
  - Die Bernauerin (1944–1946, premiere 15 June 1947)
  - Astutuli (1946–1948, premiere 20 October 1953)
  - Comoedia de Christi Resurrectione (1955, premiere 31 March 1956 on television; stage premiere 21 April 1957) – Easter Play
  - Ludus de nato Infante mirificus (1960, premiere 11 December 1960) – Nativity play
- Theatrum Mundi
  - Antigonae, setting of Sophocles's play in translation by Friedrich Hölderlin (1940–1949, premiere 9 August 1949)
  - Oedipus der Tyrann, setting of Sophocles's play in translation by Hölderlin (1951–58, premiere 11 December 1959)
  - Prometheus, setting of play attributed to Aeschylus in original Greek (1960–67, premiere 24 March 1968)
  - De temporum fine comoedia (1970–71, premiere 20 August 1973; reworked 1979 and 1981)

==== Vocal works ====
- Choral with instruments
  - Zarathustra, Opus 14 for baritone soloist, three tenor-bass choruses, ensemble, and organ on texts of Nietzsche (1911–1912), unpublished (manuscript at Bayerische Staatsbibliothek (Munich), Musiklesesaal, Orff.ms. 43 and Orff.ms. 44)
  - Treibhauslieder, Traumspiel on texts of Maurice Maeterlinck (1913–14), drafted but score largely destroyed by composer (surviving sketches in Orff-Zentrum München)
  - Des Turmes Auferstehung for tenor-bass chorus, orchestra, and organ on texts by Franz Werfel (1920–21, premiere 6 December 1995)
  - Werkbuch I – cantatas on texts of Franz Werfel (Note: In Veni Creator Spiritus and Der gute Mensch, all three movements are recompositions of earlier Lieder on the same texts from 1920. The second movement of Fremde sind wir uses the same poetry of one of the earlier Lieder; the music has similarity to the earlier work.)
    1. Veni creator spiritus for chorus, pianos, and percussion (premiere 7 October 1930; revised 1968)
    2. Der gute Mensch for chorus, pianos, and percussion (premiere 11 October 1930; revised 1968)
    3. Fremde sind wir for chorus, violins, and contrabasses; reworked version for chorus and pianos (premiere 10 July 1935; reworked 1968)
  - Werkbuch II – cantatas on texts of Bertolt Brecht for chorus, pianos, and percussion (1930–1931, reworked 1968–1973)
    1. Von der Freundlichkeit der Welt (first published 1973, premiere 19 March 1979)
    2. Vom Frühjahr, Öltank, und vom Fliegen (first published 1932, premiere 11 July 1965; revised 1968)
  - Dithyrambi for mixed chorus and instruments on texts of Friedrich Schiller
    1. Die Sänger der Vorwelt (1955, premiere 3 August 1956; reworked 1981)
    2. Nänie und Dithyrambe (1956, premiere 4 December 1956; reworked 1981)
  - Rota for children's chorus, mixed chorus, and instruments on traditional old English text "Sumer is icumen in" (1972, premiere 26 August 1972 at opening ceremonies of the 1972 Summer Olympics)
  - Sprechstücke for speaker, spoken chorus, and percussion on anonymous texts and texts by Bertolt Brecht (1976)
- Vocal a cappella
  - "Der sinnende Storch", Op. 7 for SATB vocal quartet on text of Franz Josef Stritt (1911), unpublished (manuscript at Bayerische Staatsbibliothek (Munich), Musiklesesaal, Orff.ms. 30)
  - Ave Maria for mixed chorus (ca. 1912–1914, premiere 23 July 1982)
  - Cantus-Firmus-Sätze I: Zwölf alte Melodien für Singstimmen oder Instrumente (1925–1932, first published in 1932; republished in 1954 without Nos. 6 and 7)
  - Catulli Carmina I, seven movements for mixed chorus on texts by Catullus (1930, published 1931; six movements incorporated into Catulli Carmina: Ludi scaeni; the other republished in 1979 as "Lugete o veneres")
  - Catulli Carmina II, three movements for mixed chorus on texts by Catullus (1931, published 1932), revised and republished as Concento di voci I: Sirmio, Tria Catulli Carmina (1954)
  - Concento di voci II: Laudes creaturarum: Quas fecit Beatus Franciscus ad Laudem et Honorem Dei for eight-part mixed chorus on text of Francis of Assisi (1954, premiere 21 July 1957)
  - Concento di voci III: Sunt lacrimae rerum. Cantiones seriae for tenor-bass chorus; texts of the three movements respectively by Orlando di Lasso, from Ecclesiastes 3, and anonymous (1956, premiere 21 July 1957)
- Solo voice
  - With piano
  - Note: A publication of Orff's songs from 1910 to 1920 is in preparation. Only a few of the following were published around the time of their composition; the publishing house was Ernst Germann & Co. (see below for Opp. 12, 13 No. 3, 15, 17, and 18 No. 1). In 1975, Orff selected some to be printed in Carl Orff und sein Werk: Dokumentation, Vol. 1; in 1982, most of these were published in a score intended for performance.
    - Early songs without opus number: "Altes Weihnachtslied (Es ist ein Ros entsprungen)"; "Winternacht", text by Joseph Eichendorff; "Der einsame Fichtenbaum", text by Heinrich Heine; "Die Lust vergeht" and "Die Lilie", both with text by Mathilde von Bayern; "Das weiß ich genau" (Volksweise); "Mein süßes Lieb"
    - Frühlingslieder for soprano or tenor, Opus 1 (1911), texts by Ludwig Uhland
    - 9 Lieder for soprano or tenor, Opus 2 (1910–11), texts by Mathilde von Bayern (Nos. 1 and 2), Gustav Renner (No. 3), Nikolaus Lenau (No. 4), Adolf Friedrich Graf von Schack (No. 5), Julius Mosen (No. 6), Rudolf Baumbach (No. 7), Detlev von Liliencron (No. 8), Friedrich Hölderlin (No. 9)
    - 3 Lieder for Alto or Baritone, Opus 3 (1911), texts by August Kalkoff (No. 1), Theodor Storm (No. 2), Hermann Lingg (No. 3)
    - "Die Wallfahrt nach Kevlaar" for low voice, Opus 4 (1911), text by Heinrich Heine
    - "Zlatorog" for low voice, Opus 5 (1911), text by Rudolf Baumbach
    - 2 Lieder, Opus 6 (1911): No. 1 for baritone, text by Ludwig August Frankl; No. 2 for low voice, text by Richard Beer-Hofmann
    - 5 Lieder for soprano, Opus 8 (1910–11), texts by Theodor Storm (No. 1), Hermann Lingg (No. 2), Mathilde von Bayern (No. 3), Hermann Vogel (No. 4), Hans Mayr (No. 5)
    - 6 Lieder for tenor, Opus 9 (1911), texts by Börries von Münchhausen (No. 1), Heinrich Heine (Nos. 2, 3, 4, and 6), Semper (No. 5; text unidentified, possibly by Ernst Leberecht Semper)
    - 3 Lieder, Opus 10 (1911), texts by Heinrich Heine (No. 1), by Wilhelm Hertz (No. 2), and from Friedrich Fischbach's edition of Edda (No. 3)
    - 3 Lieder, Opus 11 (1911), texts by Oskar von Redwitz (No. 1), from Friedrich Nietzsche's Also sprach Zarathustra (No. 2), and by Ernst Moritz Arndt (No. 3)
    - Eliland: Ein Sang von Chiemsee, song cycle, Opus 12 (1911, published 1912), text by Karl Stieler
    - 3 Lieder, Opus 13 (1911; No. 3 published in 1912 as Opus 13), texts by Heinrich Heine (Nos. 1 and 2) and Max Haushofer Jr. (No. 3)
    - "Des Herzen Slüzzelin", Op. 15 (1912, published same year)
    - Lieder, Opus 17 (1912, published that same year), texts by Martin Greif (No. 1) and from Paul Heyse's translations of Tuscan folksongs (No. 2, comprising three individual songs)
    - 4 Lieder, Opus 18 (1912; No. 1 published that same year), texts by Börries von Münchhausen
    - 2 Lieder, Opus 19 (1912), texts by Walther von der Vogelweide
    - 2 Lieder for High Voice (1919): "Bitte", text by Nikolas Lenau; "Mein Herz ist wie ein See so weit", text by Friedrich Nietzsche
    - 3 Lieder for High Voice on texts by Klabund (1919): "Zwiegespräch", "Blond ist mein Haar", "Herr, ich liebte"
    - The First 5 Lieder und Gesänge on Texts by Franz Werfel (1920): "Als mich dein Wandeln", "Rache", "Ein Liebeslied", "Mondlied eines Mädchens", "Der gute Mensch" (of these, "Ein Liebeslied" and "Der gute Mensch" incorporated into Werkbuch I; see Choral Works)
    - The Second 5 Lieder und Gesänge on Texts by Franz Werfel (1920): "Lächeln, Atmen, Schreiten", "Litanei eines Kranken", "Nacht", "Fremde sind wir", "Veni creator spiritus" (all incorporated into Werkbuch I; see Choral Works)
  - With Orchestra
    - Orchestral version of 4 Lieder, Opus 18 (1912), unpublished (manuscript at Bayerische Staatsbibliothek, Orff.ms. 41 and 42); see under "Solo Voice – With Piano"
    - 3 Lieder for Tenor and Orchestra on texts of Richard Dehmel (1919), unpublished (manuscript at Bayerische Staatsbibliothek, Musiklesesaal, Orff.ms. 9 and Orff.ms.10)

==== Instrumental ====
- Orchestral
  - Tanzende Faune: Ein Orchesterspiel, Opus 21 (1914, premiere 6 December 1995)
  - Entrata for large orchestra in five antiphonal groups, after "The Bells" by William Byrd (1539–1623) (1928, premiere 1930; reworked 1940, premiere 28 February 1941)
- Ensemble
  - Kleines Konzert nach Lautensätzen aus dem 16. Jh., after lute works by Vincenzo Galilei, Jean-Baptiste Besard, and anonymous (1927, premiere 11 December 1928; reworked 1937 and 1975)
- Chamber
  - Quartettsatz in B minor for string quartet, Opus 22 (ca. 1914, premiere 5 July 1989)
  - Quartettsatz in C minor for string quartet (1921, premiere 18 October 2007)
  - Präludium und Kanon for four viols and cembalo (ca. 1923), unpublished; Kanon later used at the end of De temporum fine comoedia
- Solo Piano
  - Tonbild nach Andersen, Opus 16 (1912), unpublished (manuscript at Bayerische Staatsbibliothek, Musiklesesaal, Orff.ms. 39)

=== II. Pedagogical works ===
- Orff Schulwerk
  - Musik für Kinder (with Gunild Keetman) (1930–35, reworked 1950–54)
  - Tanzstück (1933)
  - Gassenhauer

== Legacy ==
On 2 November 2025, the Carl Orff Museum opens at Ammersee on initiative of the Carl Orff foundation.

== Notes and references ==
=== Sources ===
- Brembeck, Reinhard J. (1999a). "Mitläufer oder Widerstandskämpfer? Ein neues Dokument hat einen Historikerstreit über die Rolle des Komponisten Carl Orff im Nationalsozialismus ausgelöst". Süddeutsche Zeitung (in German)., 8 February 1999, Münchner Kultur, p. 16.
- Busch-Frank, Sabine (24 June 2020). "'Er war politisch erschreckend naiv.' Der Wiener Historiker Oliver Rathkolb hat das Leben Carl Orffs in der NS-Zeit untersucht". Donaukurier (in German). Archived from the original on 6 November 2023.
- Dangel-Hofmann, Frohmut (1999). "Orff, Carl". Neue Deutsche Biographie (in German). Vol. 19. Berlin: Duncker & Humblot. pp. 588–591. (full text online).
- Davenport, Mark (September 1995). "Carl Orff: The Katz Connection". The American Recorder. XXXVI (4): 7–15, 34–39.
- DCamp, Richard M. (1995). The Drama of Carl Orff: From 'Unerwünscht' to Postmodernity. University of Iowa: PhD. dissertation.
- Drobnitsch, Helmut (1989). "Ahnen Prominenter Bayern VII. Die Familie des Komponisten Carl Orff (1895–1982)". Blätter des bayerischen Landesvereins für Familienkunde. 52: 73–83.
- Gläß, Susanne (2008). Carl Orff: Carmina Burana. Kassel: Bärenreiter. ISBN 978-3-7618-1732-2.
- Haas, Barbara (2004). Dibelius, Ulrich (ed.). "Die Münchner Komponisten-Trio: Das nicht immer unproblematische Verhältnis zwischen Orff, Egk und Hartmann". Karl Amadeus Hartmann: Komponist Im Widerstreit. Kassel: Bärenreiter: 228–250.
- Henkel, Theresa; Messmer, Franzpeter, eds. (2021). Carl Orff. Komponisten in Bayern (in German). Vol. 65. Munich: Allitera. ISBN 978-3-96233-296-9.
- Hennenberg, Fritz (2011). Orff-Studien. Leipzig: Engelsdorfer Verlag. ISBN 978-3-86268-452-6.
- Karner, Otto (2002). Komponisten unterm Hakenkreuz: Sieben Komponistportraits während der Zeit des Nationalsozialismus. University of Vienna: PhD. dissertation (unpublished).
- Kater, Michael H. (1995). "Carl Orff im Dritten Reich" [Carl Orff in the Third Reich] (PDF, 1.6 MB). Vierteljahrshefte für Zeitgeschichte (in German). 43 (1): 1–35. ISSN 0042-5702.
- Kater, Michael H. (2000). Composers of the Nazi Era: Eight Portraits. New York: Oxford University Press. ISBN 978-0-19-515286-9.
- Kater, Michael H. (2019). Culture in Nazi Germany. New Haven: Yale University Press. doi:10.2307/j.ctvfc542q.
- Kohler, Andrew S. (2015). 'Grey C, Acceptable': Carl Orff's Professional and Artistic Responses to the Third Reich (PhD dissertation). University of Michigan. hdl:2027.42/111359.
- Kowalke, Kim H. (Spring 2000). "Burying the Past: Carl Orff and His Brecht Connection". The Musical Quarterly. 84 (1): 58–83. doi:10.1093/mq/84.1.58. JSTOR 742576.
- Liess, Andreas (1966). Carl Orff: His Life and His Music. Translated by Parkin, Adelheid and Herbert. New York: St. Martin's Press. ISBN 978-0-7145-0151-2.
- Monod, David (2003). Kater, Michael H. and Albrecht Riethmüller (ed.). "Verklärte Nacht: Denazifiying Musicians Under American Control". Music and Nazism: Art Under Tyranny, 1933–1945. Laaber: Laaber: 292–314.
- Monod, David (2005). Settling Scores: German Music, Denazification, & the Americans, 1945–1953. Chapel Hill and London: The University of North Carolina Press.
- Orff, Carl (1964). "Musik zum Sommernachtstraum: Ein Bericht". Shakespeare-Jahrbuch. 100: 117–34.
- Orff, Carl (1975–1983). Carl Orff und sein Werk. Dokumentation. 8 vols. Tutzing: Hans Schneider. ISBN 978-3-7952-0154-8, 3-7952-0162-4, 3-7952-0202-7, 3-7952-0257-4, 3-7952-0294-9, 3-7952-0308-2, 3-7952-0308-2, 3-7952-0373-2.
- Orff, Godela (1995). Mein Vater und ich. Munich: Piper. ISBN 978-3-492-18332-1.
- Palmer, Tony (2008). O, Fortuna! (DVD). Voiceprint (TP-DVD118).
- Painter, Karen (2007). Symphonic Aspirations: German Music and Politics, 1900–1945. Cambridge, Massachusetts: Harvard University Press. ISBN 978-0-674-02661-2.
- Prieberg, Fred K. (2009). Handbuch Deutsche Musiker 1933–1945 (2nd. ed.). Self-published CD-Rom.
- Rathkolb, Oliver (2021). Carl Orff und der Nationalsozialismus. Publikationen des Orff-Zentrums München, Band II/2. Mainz: Schott Music. ISBN 978-3-79-572755-0.
- Rockwell, John (5 December 2003). "Reverberations; Going Beyond 'Carmina Burana,' and Beyond Orff's Stigma". The New York Times.
- Rösch, Thomas (2003). Die Musik in den griechischen Tragödien von Carl Orff. Münchner Veröffentlichungen zur Musikgeschichte, Bd. 59. Tutzing: Hans Schneider. ISBN 978-3-7952-0976-6.
- Rösch, Thomas (2004). "Orff, Carl". Die Musik in Geschichte und Gegenwart. Vol. 12 (2nd ed.). Kassel: Bärenreiter Verlag. pp. 1397–1409.
- Rösch, Thomas (2009). Carl Orff – Musik zu Shakespeares "Ein Sommernachtstraum". Entstehung und Deutung. Munich: Orff-Zentrum.
- Rösch, Thomas, ed. (2015). Text, Musik, Szene – Das Musiktheater von Carl Orff. Symposium Orff-Zentrum München 2007. Mainz: Schott. ISBN 978-3-7957-0672-2.
- Rösch, Thomas (2021a). "Carl Orff 1895–1982. Der Lebensweg eines Musiktheater-Komponisten im 20. Jahrhundert". In Henkel & Messmer (2021), pp. 11–44.
- Rösch, Thomas (2021b). "Carl Orff. De temporum fine comoedia". In Henkel & Messmer (2021), pp. 178–189.
- Schaffner, Bertram (1948). Fatherland: A Study of Authoritarianism in the Germany Family. New York: Columbia University Press.
- Seifert, Wolfgang (1970). "'...auf den Geist kommt es an': Carl Orff zum 75. Geburtstag – Kommentar und Gespräch". Neue Zeitschrift für Musik. 131 (7/8 July/August): 370–377. Interview with Orff and Wolfgang Seifert (1932–2013) on pp. 373–377; interview reprinted in Henkel & Messmer 2021, pp. 45–55.
- Willnauer, Franz, ed. (1995). Carmina Burana von Carl Orff: Entstehung, Wirkung, Text. Mainz: Piper-Schott.
