= Catulli Carmina =

1940 cantata by Carl Orff

- Scenic cantata by Carl Orff
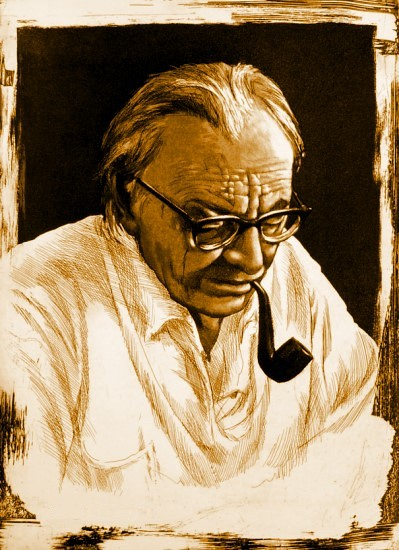
- The composer, aquatint etching
- Description: ludi scaenici (scenic plays)
- Language: Latin
- Based on: Poetry of Catullus
- Premiere: 6 November 1943; Leipzig Opera

Catulli Carmina (Songs of Catullus) is a cantata by Carl Orff dating from 1940–1943. He described it as ludi scaenici (scenic plays). The work mostly sets poems of the Latin poet Catullus to music, with some text by the composer. Catulli Carmina is part of Trionfi, the musical triptych that also includes the Carmina Burana and Trionfo di Afrodite. It is scored for a full mixed choir, soprano and tenor soloists, and an entirely percussive orchestra – possibly inspired by Stravinsky's Les noces – consisting of four pianos, timpani, bass drum, 3 tambourines, triangle, castanets, maracas, suspended and crash cymbals, antique cymbal (without specified pitch), tam-tam, lithophone, metallophone, 2 glockenspiels, wood block, xylophone, and tenor xylophone/low xylophone.

== Dramatic structure ==
The piece is divided into three parts: a prelude with Latin text by Orff, the central dramatic story using Catullus' poems, and a short postlude which recalls the music of the prelude.

In the prelude, groups of young women and young men sing to each other of eternal ("eis aiona" – "forever" – two words of Greek in the otherwise Latin text) love and devotion, along with quite explicit statements of the erotic activities they intend with each other. (In the texts distributed with programs and early recordings, such as the Turnabout (Vox) one, many lines in the translation are left blank.) A group of old men interrupts with sarcastic comments and charges the young people to listen to "the songs of Catullus".

The story proper tells of Catullus, a lovesick young man who falls in love with Lesbia, a woman who does not remain faithful to him. The tenor and soprano soloists portray Catullus and Lesbia respectively. This story is based loosely on the factual relationship between Catullus and Clodia, with a text mostly constructed from the poems of Catullus, in which he did address Clodia by the pseudonym Lesbia. Catullus wrote many poems about this relationship and the ones selected for the cantata take the audience through its several phases.

In this listing, the poems are given the standard numbers. Subject to occasional textual variants, the poems are as written by Catullus, except for some interpolations in Latin ('O mea Lesbia' and the like, and exclamations of approval by the old men) and the curious extra words in poem 109.

=== Act 1 ===
- "Odi et amo" (poem 85)
- "Vivamus, mea Lesbia, atque amemus" (poem 5)
- "Ille mi par esse deo videtur" (poem 51)
- "Caeli! Lesbia nostra, Lesbia illa" (poem 58)
- "Nulli se dicit mulier mea nubere malle quam mihi" (poem 70)

=== Act 2 ===
- "Jucundum mea vita" (poem 109, with the apparently Italian words Dormi, dormi ancora interpolated)
- "Desine de quoquam quicquam bene velle mereri" (poem 73)

=== Act 3 ===
- "Odi et amo" (poem 85)
- "Amabo mea dulcis Ipsitilla" (poem 32)
- "Ameana, puella defututa" (poem 41)
- "Miser Catulle, desinas ineptire" (poem 8)
- "Nulla potest mulier tantum se dicere amatam" (poem 87)
- "Nunc est mens deducta tua mea, Lesbia, culpa" (poem 75)

This selection and sequence of poems is apparently intended to tell the young people on stage that love will not last forever.

However, in the postlude, the young people have clearly decided to ignore the message and the cantata ends with their continued exclamations of "eis aiona" (meaning "forever"), to the exasperation of the old men.

== The music ==
The orchestra only plays in the prelude and postlude, whereas in the Catullus play itself, the soloists are only accompanied by the chorus, which takes the part of a Greek chorus. The piece experiments with repeated phrases and syncopated rhythms even more so than Carmina Burana. Scholars have debated the reason why this is such a lesser-known work, compared to its predecessor. It has been suggested that, with the fall of Nazi Germany and the depressed feeling of Europe in the aftermath of World War II, for a long time it simply did not have the opportunity to be presented to any large audience.

== Recordings ==
- Deutsche Grammophon (recorded June 1954, Nov 1955; reissued on CD 474 131-2): Annelies Kupper (soprano), Richard Holm (tenor); Bavarian Radio Chorus; Eugen Jochum (conductor).
- CBS BRG 72611 (original LP): Janice Harsanyi, Richard Kness; Temple University Choirs; Philadelphia Orchestra; Eugene Ormandy (conductor); Robert Page (choral director).
- Arts Music (CD reissue): Ruth-Margret Pütz (soprano), Donald Grobe (tenor); Cologne Radio Choir; Kölner Rundfunk-Sinfonie-Orchester; Ferdinand Leitner (conductor).
- Deutsche Grammophon DGG 2530 074 (original LP): Arleen Auger (soprano), Wiesław Ochman (tenor); Chorus of the Deutsche Oper Berlin; Eugen Jochum (conductor).
- Supraphon 1112 1462 (original LP, copyright date on label 1974); Helena Tattermuschová (soprano), Ivo Židek (tenor); Ludmilla Tržická, Vladimir Topinka; Vladimir Menci and Oldřich Kredba (pianos), Czech Philharmonic Chorus, Prague Symphony Orchestra, Václav Smetáček (conductor).
- Vox PL 8640 (LP, first issued 1954, re-issued 1963): Elisabeth Roon (soprano); Hans Loeffler (tenor); Walter Klien, Michael Gielen, Eduard Mrazek, Walter Kamper (pianos); Vienna Chamber Choir, Heinrich Hollreiser (conductor).
- Philips 6500 815 (original LP): Ute Mai (soprano); Eberhard Büchner (tenor); Jutta Czapski, Günter Philipp (piano), Wolfgang Wappler, Gerhard Erber (pianos); Chorus of Radio Leipzig; Herbert Kegel (conductor).
- EMI Classics (released in 1995 and 2005): Dagmar Schellenberger (soprano); Lothar Odinius (tenor); Mozart-Chor Linz; Munich Radio Orchestra; Franz Welser-Möst (conductor).
- Forlane UCD 16610 (CD released January 25, 1995), recorded live at the 20th Festival International de Sofia 1988/89: Elena Stoyanova (soprano); Kaludi Kaludov (tenor); Bulgarian Radio-Television Symphony Orchestra and Mixed Choir, Michail Milkov (conductor).
- Newport Classic NCD 60118 (1990), Susan Crowder (soprano); Philip Bologna (tenor), Choral Guild of Atlanta, William Noll (conductor).
