= Margaret Murray (music educator) =

Margaret Murray MBE (1921–2015), was a British music educator and musician. Together with Gunild Keetman, she produced a "seminal" English-language version of Carl Orff's Orff-Schulwerk in 1957.

== Publications ==
- Wee Willie Winkie, and seven other songs using three and four notes with easy accompaniments, 1965
- Eighteen pieces for descant recorder and Orff-instruments, 1966
- Nine carols, 1973
