= Trionfi (Orff) =

Trionfi is a trilogy of cantatas by German composer Carl Orff, comprising Carmina Burana, Catulli Carmina and Trionfo di Afrodite. The works celebrate erotic love in history, inspired by Latin, Ancient Greek, Old French and Middle High German texts.

Carmina Burana is by far the most famous of the three.
