= Bryan Montgomery =

American actor

- Born: Beecher Bryan Montgomery; July 20, 1946; San Angelo, Texas, U.S.
- Died: December 12, 2008 (aged 62); Malibu, California, U.S.
- Occupation: Actor

Beecher Bryan Montgomery (July 20, 1946 – December 12, 2008) was an American actor. He was known for his appearances in the films Badlands (1973), Cat Ballou (1971), and Standing Tall (1978).

Mongomery died on December 12, 2008, at his home in Malibu, California, at the age of 62.

== Filmography ==
=== Film ===
Year	Title	Role	Notes
1972	Slaughterhouse-Five	Slave Boy	Uncredited
1973	Badlands	Boy	
2008	The Pugilist	Chairbound Charlie	Short; also writer and director

=== Television ===
Year	Title	Role	Notes
1971	Cat Ballou	Clay	Television pilot
1971	Alias Smith and Jones	Johnny	Episode: "Jailbreak at Junction City"
1971	The F.B.I.	Jimmy Faron	Episode: "Dynasty of Hate"
1971	Owen Marshall, Counselor at Law	Roger Carlisle	Episode: "Shadow of a Name"
1971	Sarge	Harry	Episode: "A Bad Case of Monogamy"
1971	Ironside	Pfc. Jerry Kovak	Episode: "Good Samaritan"
1975–1976	Barnaby Jones	Lester Gibson / Tommy Allen	3 episodes
1976	The Quest	Billy Jarvis	Episode: "Dynasty of Evil"
1978	Standing Tall	Captain Earl Hinton	Television film
1987	Great Performances	Young Soldier	Episode: "Tales from the Hollywood Hills: Natica Jackson"
1990	Columbo	Security Man #2	Episode: "Agenda for Murder"
