= Dorothee Günther =

German choreographer

- Born: October 8, 1896
- Died: September 18, 1975 (aged 78)

Dorothee Günther (8 October 1896 — 18 September 1975) was a dance and gymnastics teacher. She founded the Günther School with Carl Orff.

== Biography ==
Dorothee Günther was born in Gelsenkirchen on 8 October 1896 as Anna-Katharine Dorothea Günther. Günther met Carl Orff in 1923, with whom she founded the Günther School in 1924. The Günther School educated students in music and dance. In 1933, Günther joined the NSDAP.

In 1944, the Nazis shut down the school in order to use it as a military base.
