= Everett Helm =

American classical composer

Everett Burton Helm (17 July 1913, Minneapolis – 25 June 1999, Berlin), was an American composer, musicologist and music critic.

He studied at Harvard University, and then after having been awarded a travel fellowship, with Gian Francesco Malipiero in Italy and Ralph Vaughan Williams in England. In 1948, he was appointed Music Officer for the occupying US army in Germany, which introduced him to the Darmstadt Internationale Ferienkurse für Neue Musik in contemporary classical music. Helm regularly participated in the Darmstadt summer schools over the next decades.

From 1950 and into the 1960s, Helm worked as a music critic in Germany, writing for The New York Times, the San Francisco Chronicle and Musical America. In parallel, he was composing. The Berlin Philharmonic Orchestra commissioned and premiered his First Piano Concerto in 1951, the same year as his first opera, Adam and Eve, was performed at the Hessisches Staatstheater Wiesbaden. His Second Piano Concerto was commissioned by the Louisville Orchestra and first performed on February 25, 1956. It was recorded by the orchestra under Robert Whitney with Benjamin Owen as pianist.**

== Sources ==
- Sonneck Society for American Music Bulletin, Volume XXV, no. 3: Obituary for Helm.
  - Notes for the Louisville Orchestra recording, LOU-58-3.
- Grove Music Online: article on Helm.
