= Michael Hans Kater =

German-Canadian historian of Nazism (1937–2025)

Michael Hans Kater (4 July 1937 – 17 November 2025), also known as Michael H. Kater, was a German-Canadian historian of Nazism. He was Distinguished Research Professor Emeritus of history at York University, Toronto, and a fellow of the Royal Society of Canada.

== Early life and education ==
Kater was born on 4 July 1937 in Zittau, and moved to Canada in his teens. He graduated from St. Michael's College School in Toronto and earned bachelor's and master's degrees from the University of Toronto. After studying at LMU Munich and Heidelberg University, he completed his PhD in 1966.

== Career ==
After working as a lecturer at the University of Maryland, College Park, from 1965 to 1966, Kater spent the remainder of his career at York University, where he was an assistant professor from 1967 to 1970, associate professor from 1970 to 1973, professor from 1973 to 1991, and distinguished research professor from 1991 until becoming emeritus. From 1985 to 1986, he was Jason A. Hannah Visiting Professor of the History of Medicine at McMaster University, and in the 1990s, he was a visiting professor at the University of Toronto.

Kater was also a jazz musician and music historian.

== Death ==
Kater died on 17 November 2025, at the age of 88.

== Honors ==
Kater was a past recipient of fellowships including the Guggenheim Fellowship and the Canada Council Senior Killam Fellowship. He became a Fellow of the Royal Society of Canada in 1988 and in 1990 won the Konrad Adenauer Research Award of the Alexander von Humboldt Foundation. His book Doctors Under Hitler won the Royal Society of Canada's Jason A. Hannah Medal in 1991.

== Selected publications ==
- Das "Ahnenerbe" der SS 1935–1945. Ein Beitrag zur Kulturpolitik des Dritten Reiches (Dissertation, University of Heidelberg, 1966). Studien zur Zeitgeschichte. Vol. 6. Munich: Oldenbourg. 2006 [1974].
- The Nazi Party: A Social Profile of Members and Leaders, 1919–1945. Harvard University Press. 1983. doi:10.1353/jsh/18.3.496.
- Doctors Under Hitler. University of North Carolina Press. 1989. ISBN 9780807848586.
- Different Drummers: Jazz in the Culture of Nazi Germany. Oxford University Press. 1992. ISBN 9780195165531.
- Hitler Youth. Harvard University Press. 2004. ISBN 9780674019911.
- Weimar: From Enlightenment to the Present. Yale University Press. 2014. ISBN 9780300170566.
- Michael H. Kater (2019). Culture in Nazi Germany. Yale University Press. ISBN 9780300211412.
