= Friedrich Fischbach =

German textile designer

Friedrich Fischbach (1839 Aachen - 1908) was a German textile designer.

== Biography ==
He received his education at the Berlin Academy of Industrial Design. In 1862, he moved to Vienna where he followed the profession of decorator and designer. There he prepared drawings for the collection of pattern designs in the Austrian Museum. He became teacher of ornamentation at the Royal Academy, Hanau, in 1870, and from 1883 to 1888 served as director of the newly organized Industrial Art School of Saint Gall. He sold his collection of fabrics and embroideries to the Textile Museum in Saint Gall in 1888. In 1889, he moved to Wiesbaden. He founded many societies for the advancement of industrial art and by his work exercised a great influence on textile designing in Germany. In 1909, the Metropolitan Museum of Art, New York City, acquired his surviving collection of antique embroideries and fabrics.

== Writings ==
- Ornamente der Gewebe, with 160 colored plates (1874–81)
- Geschichte der Textilkunst (1883)
- Südslavische Ornamente (2d ed., 1872)
- Album für Stickerei (130 patterns in gold and colors, 1872; 1880)
- Neue Muster für Stickerei und Häkelarbeiten (3 series, 1880–83)
- Stickereimuster (1888)
- Häkelvorlagen (1889)
- Weissstickereivorlagen (1892)
- Die Wichtigsten Webemuster bis zum 19ten Jahrhundert (1900)
