= Die Bernauerin =

Opera by Carl Orff

Die Bernauerin is a piece in Bavarian dialect by the composer Carl Orff to his own libretto on the life of Agnes Bernauer. It was first performed on 15 June 1947 in Stuttgart.

== Recordings ==
- Die Bernauerin, Agnes: Christine Ostermayer, The Duke: Gerhart Lippert, Tenor solo: Horst Laubenthal, Soprano solo: Lucia Popp, Munich Radio Orchestra, conducted Kurt Eichhorn. Orfeo, ADD, 1978/1980
