= Gunild Keetman =

The German educator Gunild Keetman (5 June 1904, Elberfeld – 14 December 1990, Breitbrunn) was the primary originator of the approach to teaching music known as Orff Schulwerk. Keetman was responsible for most of the actual teaching that was done in the early stages of the movement, perhaps most prominently as the teacher for the radio and television broadcasts that popularized the Schulwerk throughout Germany in the 1950s.

As a young woman, Keetman was unsure of herself and of her calling in life. In her twenties, however, she came under the ideals and music instruction of Dorothee Günther and Carl Orff at the Güntherschule in Munich, Germany. This event helped Keetman to truly find herself, and she flourished in this environment. She began to teach at the Güntherschule after being a pupil for many years; however, the school was destroyed by a bombing in Munich when Keetman was in her early 40s. At that point, she and Carl Orff began the development of the Orff Schulwerk approach, for which she is best known today.

== Life ==
=== Early years ===
Gunild Keetman was born in Germany in 1904 to parents who seriously cultivated music and made sure it was an integral part of their daughter’s life. Her parents also expected her to get a full education, which included study at the university level. Despite the turbulent times of World War I and the unfortunate restraints placed upon women, she went to the University of Bonn in 1923. She then transferred to the University of Berlin the following year, but that did not work out well either. After struggling for a few years, she finally made what would become a pivotal decision in her life: she enrolled in the Güntherschule in Munich in 1926. Carl Orff and Dorothee Günther opened this school in 1924 in Munich to protest the German version of Victorianism then rampant. The Güntherschule employed modern dance to provoke a protest, combining rejection, discovery, and idealism. It was here that Keetman finally found where she belonged and what she wanted to do with her life. She became fully invested in the school. In fact, she would spend the next 18 years of her life learning, and then eventually teaching at the school.

=== Teaching ===
In 1945, when Keetman was 41, the Güntherschule was destroyed in an Allied air raid. Keetman and the other members of the school were lost. For years, this establishment had been all they had known, and it was now gone. Keetman stated, “We had our recorders with us; we could not do anything but make music together. In that moment, we played out our entire misery and sadness. I believe that when we finally stopped playing, we had played ourselves a little courage.”

It was a result of this event, however, that Keetman turned her writing focus to a significantly younger audience. She began a struggle for educational reform, as she took the ideas and methods of the Güntherschule and applied them to music and movement education for younger children. Administrators were not keen on educational reform during this time, so Keetman had the idea of broadcasting her methods by the radio, and later, television. After successfully broadcasting over radio, television, and records, the approach was becoming a success. In 1950, Keetman and Orff wrote the five Music for Children volumes, enabling the approach to reach an international audience. It was also during this decade that Keetman turned her focus to training teachers at the Orff Schulwerk headquarters in Salzburg. The work had become the essence of her life; she lived and breathed it every moment. She would continue to teach others to teach in this way until her death in 1990.

== Compositional style ==
Keetman’s works are written for the characteristic “Orff instruments.” This includes the glockenspiel, xylophone, metallophone, recorder, and body percussion. The Music for Children volumes are designed to layer all of these instruments, one step at a time, eventually creating a polyphonic ensemble piece to be performed. These compositions usually consist of basic beat or note patterns, allowing the children flexibility to choose pitches and compositional patterns. Keetman strongly believe that play is essential to learning, and therefore gave students the opportunity to create anew within the wide boundary of her compositions. She also wrote works for the recorder, as this is another key instrument in the Orff Schulwerk approach. It was one of her most beloved instruments to play personally, and she did so throughout her years at the Güntherschule. She later applied what she learned there to compose works for Orff Schulwerk.

== Works ==
- Keetman, Gunild and Carl Orff. Music for Children, Vols. 1-5. Germany: Schott’s Sohne, 1960.
- Keetman, Gunild. Elementaria: first acquaintance with Orff Schulwerk. London: Schott and Co. Ltd., 1974.
- Keetman, Gunild. Rhythmische Ubung. New York: Schott Music Corp., 1970.
- Frazee, Jane. Discovering Keetman: rhythmic exercises and pieces for xylophone. New York: Schott, 1998.
- Keetman, Gunild. Elemental Recorder Playing. New York: Schott, 1999.
