= Orff Schulwerk =

Developmental approach to music education

The Orff Schulwerk, or simply the Orff Approach, is a developmental approach used in music education. It combines music, movement, drama, and speech into lessons that are similar to a child's world of play. It was developed by the German composer Carl Orff (1895–1982) and colleague Gunild Keetman during the 1920s. Orff worked until the end of his life to continue the development and spread of his teaching method.

The Orff Approach is now used throughout the world to teach students in a natural and comfortable environment. The term Schulwerk is German for (literally) school work or schooling, in this regard in the area of music.

== Foundations ==
The Orff Approach of music education uses very rudimentary forms of everyday activity for the purpose of music creation by music students. The Orff Approach is a "child-centered way of learning" music education that treats music as a basic system like language, and believes that just as every child can learn language without formal instruction, every child can learn music through a gentle and friendly approach.

It is often called Elemental Music making because the materials needed to teach students are "basic, natural, and close to a child’s world of thought and fantasy".

In order for the Orff Approach to work effectively, teachers must create an atmosphere that is similar to a child's world of play. This allows participating children to feel comfortable learning a new and often abstract musical skill, greater exploration of a musical instrument or musical skill, and keeps a student from feeling evaluated or judged by his or her peers and teachers. A child participating in an Orff classroom does not feel the pressure of performing that is often in tandem with music because every student in an Orff classroom is treated as an equal, even when performing a solo.

The Orff Approach is used by teachers to encourage their students to enjoy making music as individuals as well as in groups. Children realize the joys of group co-ordination and cohesion. It also involves the participation of other adults and parents in music making. Thus it brings the role of parent in child education in a central position. From a teacher's aspect Orff-Schulwerk is also a process of breaking down each activity into its simplest form and then presenting those steps one at a time to eventually become a completed performance.

In the Orff Approach "all concepts are learned by 'doing'". Students of the Orff Approach learn music by experiencing and participating in the different musical lessons and activities. These lessons stimulate not only the paraxial concepts of music like rhythm and tempo, but also the aesthetic qualities of music. "Orff activities awaken the child’s total awareness" and "sensitize the child’s awareness of space, time, form, line, color, design, and mood- aesthetic data that musicians are acutely aware of, yet find hard to explain to musical novices".

Unlike Simply Music or the Suzuki Method, the Orff Schulwerk approach is not a method. There is no systematic stepwise procedure to be followed. There are fundamental principles, clear models and basic processes that all intuitive and creative teachers use to guide their organization of musical ideas.

== Music ==
The music generated in the Orff Approach is largely improvisational and uses original tonal constructions that build a sense of confidence and interest in the process of creative thinking. Students of the Orff Approach sing, play instruments, and dance alone as well as in groups. Songs are usually short, contain ostinatos, are within singing range, can be manipulated to be played in a round or ABA form. "Music is chosen with strong nationalistic flavor, being related to folk songs and music of the child’s own heritage". Music can also be anything from nursery rhymes to songs that are invented by the children themselves. Orff-Schulwerk music is largely based on simple but forceful variations on rhythmic patterns. This makes for very simple and beautiful musical forms, which are easily learned by young children, and is also useful for adults and thus it has a universal appeal. Composer Dave Hewson was exposed to Orff Schulwerk and this influence helped to shape a lot of his later music.

The music is largely modal, beginning with pentatonic (both major and minor) scales. (English version adapted by Margaret Murray) The drone or bordun, is quickly established as the ground bass that supports most melodies and melodic ostinatos add energy and colour.

Volume II in Part One, covers hexachordal (added fa) melodies over Major Drone Bass Triads, and then seven notes: Ionian mode. Note, this is not major scale, as the drone bass enforces a non-functional harmony. Parallel thirds and sixths (paraphony) are used liberally here. Part Two introduces the use of triads as following: I – ii, and some I – vi.

Goodkin (p172) discusses the progression of the volumes: I-II-III-IV-V as opposed to I-II-IV-III-V. Volume III introduces Major Dominant and Subdominant triads (That is to say: functional harmony). However Volume IV can be viewed as more logically the next step as it introduces Dorian, Aeolian and Phrygian modes with similar shifting drones and triads to those found previously in Vol II.

Vol IV, Part One: Minor-Drone Bass Triads. Aeolian, Dorian and Phrygian mode, i-ii shifting drones and triads. Part Two: Tonic and Leading Note triads, i-IV and decoration of the third.

Vol III Major Dominant and Subdominant Triads. This harmonic world is more challenging for children and improvising than the modes, hence the importance of leaving until skills have developed appropriately.

Volume V follows III, but explores Minor Dominant and Subdominant Chords.

And finally, almost as an afterthought, Paralipomena which explores the worlds of Lydian I-II, and Mixolydian I-VII.

When interesting original music has been generated by the groups or individual child a desire to record it may arise. Thus, the desire to develop musical skills emerges by itself and the child may be intrinsically propelled to learn formal music.

== Orff's Instruments and tools ==
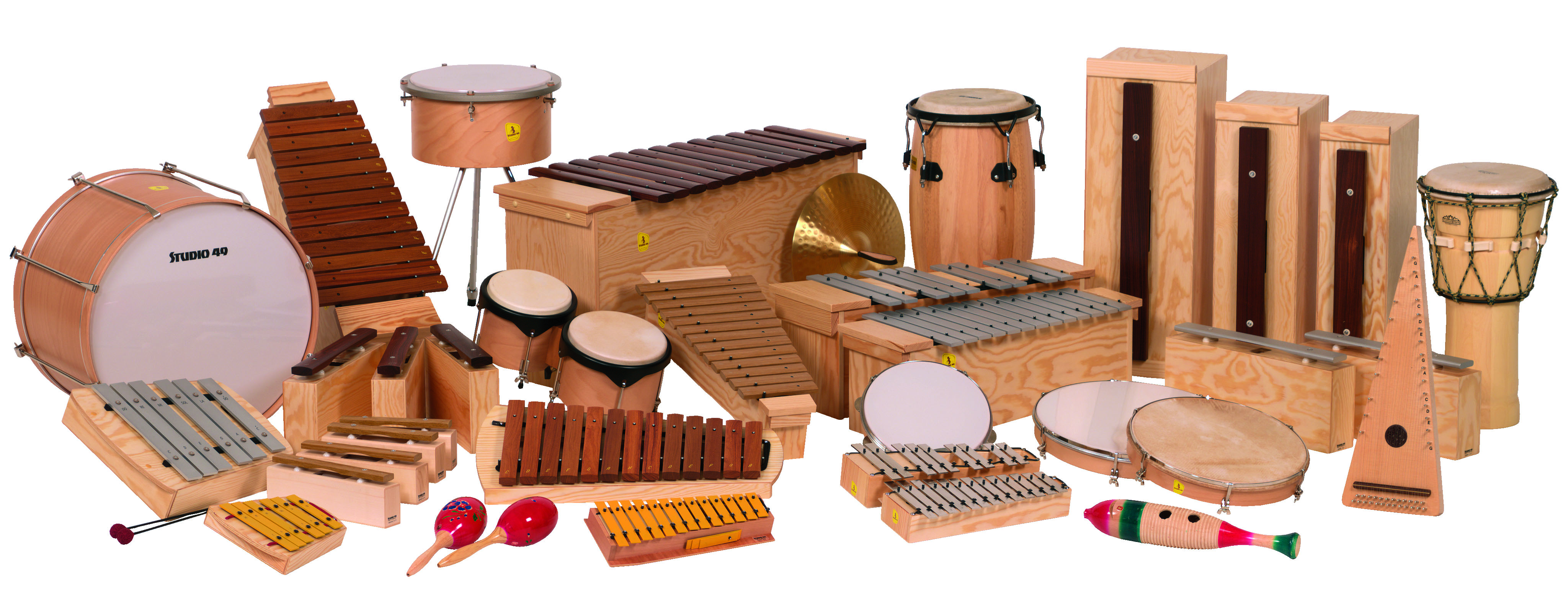
Some typical teaching instruments Orff-Schulwerk

Orff considered the percussive rhythm as a natural basic form of human expression. Orff and colleague Gunild Keetman co-composed much of the music for the five volume series, Music for Children. These volumes, first published in 1950, are still available and used today. Music played on Orff instruments is often very simple and easy to play even for first time musicians.

Some of the instruments within the approach include miniature xylophones, marimbas, glockenspiels and metallophones; all of which have removable bars, resonating columns to project the sound, and are easily transported and stored. Orff teachers also use different sized drums, recorders and non-pitched percussion instruments "to round out the songs that are sung and played". The Orff approach also requires that children sing, chant, clap, dance, pat and snap fingers along to melodies and rhythms.

== Spread ==
In 1923 Orff met Dorothee Günther while working at a theater in Munich. Günther "believed that most students did not get enough chances to do art and music and movement activities". Because of his extensive background in gymnastics and the arts Günther was able to open the Günther-Schule in 1924. Even though Orff never worked with the students of the Günther-Schule directly, this was the first institution to teach what would later be known as the Orff Approach.

Students of the Günther-Schule later went on to be dancers and teachers of note. One of these students, Keetman, began as a student and became a teacher at the school. The Günther-Schule originally only taught older students; however, Keetman later worked on developing the ideas of the school to teach younger children as well. Together she and Orff created the five volume series Music for Children which is still used by teachers today. In 1936, Günther, Keetman and Orff contributed to the opening ceremony of the 1936 Summer Olympics. The Günther-Schule was closed in 1944 due to the war. In 1945 the building was destroyed in an Allied bombing raid and all materials (instruments, costumes, photographs, and its library and archives) were destroyed.

After the war, two serendipitous events brought Orff's approach back into the educational field. A series of radio programs aimed at children was broadcast in Bavaria. Orff wrote the music and re-united with Keetman to work on these broadcasts. The second event was the Mozartariums' request to have Keetman teach classes to children between 8 and 10 years old. Traude Schrattenecker who was also a graduate of the Günther-Schule, joined Keetman in running this school.

There are Orff Schulwerk associations in different countries across the world including Germany, Canada, the United States, Australia, Korea, the United Kingdom, South Africa, France, Finland and New Zealand. All of these organisations promote the teachings of Orff and Keetman and the spread of the Approach. Through all of these organizations teachers interested in teaching the Orff Approach can become certified in the Approach.

== The American model ==
The American Orff-Schulwerk Association offers three different levels of training, each of which takes 60 hours to complete. Level one focuses on the "necessary skills to plan and implement a variety of Orff Schulwerk music and movement activities in the classroom." "Levels two and three are concerned with development of conceptual understanding of music and movement elements as they are presented in the Schulwerk elemental music context, as well as the skill needed to implement them".

In America there are four stages in the Orff Approach: imitation, exploration, improvisation, and composition. Through imitation, the teacher, group leader, or even the students perform for the class and the class in turn repeats what was played for them. Exploration allows students to seek out the musical aspects that the Orff instruments offer and explore aural/oral skills and the motions and expressions that the body is capable of. Literacy is taught by learning musical notation and becoming familiar with forms of music like rondo and ABA. Improvisation is the act of creating something, especially music, without prior preparation. To improvise, a student must have "a preliminary knowledge and comprehension of concepts." Students of the Orff Approach learn to create their own melodies in a comfortable environment that allows for mistakes and promotes creativity.

== Orff Schulwerk in Aotearoa/New Zealand ==
Orff New Zealand Aotearoa (ONZA) is a professional society dedicated to the promotion of the Orff Schulwerk approach in New Zealand. The organisation is a member of the Orff Schulwerk Forum Salzburg. In association with the University of Waikato, ONZA offers a four-tiered course of study in the Orff approach, which includes practical workshops and critical investigation.

== Other applications ==
The Orff Approach was originally intended to teach music to children but because of the different benefits that it offers with coordination, dexterity, and concentration the technique is often used to teach individuals with special needs. The simplicity of the technique allows all ranges of handicapped students to participate in the learning process. Mentally handicapped students can easily perform the tasks without fear of being ridiculed or being left behind. The visually impaired who tend to have "hesitant, jerky, and over controlled" movements because they "often breathe quite shallowly" can use the different breathing and movement exercises to relax their body and breathing. Students with a hearing impairment can use the Orff Approach by feeling the vibrations that are created by different musical instruments. Since music is mostly resilient, students who have had injuries that have mentally impaired them can use the Approach as a form of therapy. Even elderly individuals who often become weak with old age can use the Orff Approach to help with memory, dexterity, and agility.
