= List of compositions by Wolfgang Rihm =

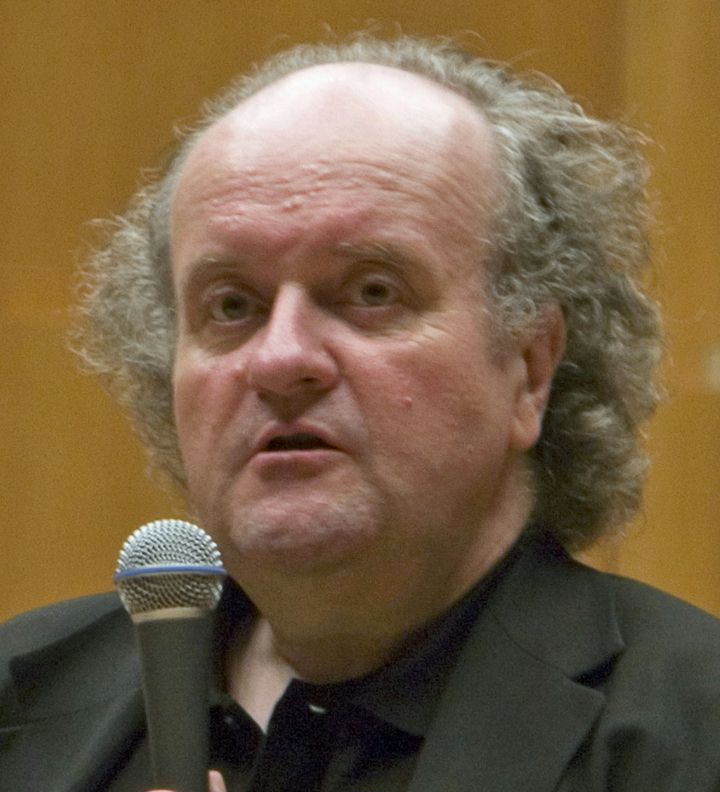
Rihm at the Kölner Philharmonie in 2007

This is a list of compositions by Wolfgang Rihm. His output numbers more than 500 works.

Rihm's compositions were published by Universal Edition. IRCAM has a list of Rihm's works.

Rihm was extremely prolific, and much of his music has yet to be commercially recorded. His works include thirteen string quartets, the opera Die Eroberung von Mexico (1987–1991, based on texts by Antonin Artaud), over twenty song cycles, the oratorio Deus Passus (1999–2000, commissioned by the Internationale Bachakademie Stuttgart), Jagden und Formen for chamber orchestra (1995–2001), more than thirty concertos, and a series of interrelated orchestral works bearing the general title Vers une symphonie fleuve ("Towards a river symphony").

He sometimes revised or adapted his finished work. For example, in 1992 he completely rewrote Ins Offene ... for orchestra (1990) and used it as the basis for his piano concerto Sphere (1994). Then he recast the piano part of Sphere to create Nachstudie for solo piano (1994). In 2002, he wrote Sphäre nach Studie (a new version of Nachstudie) for harp, two double basses, piano, and percussion, as well as Sphäre um Sphäre (a new version of Sphere) for two pianos and chamber ensemble.

He also experimented with writing musical fragments, for example in his Alexanderlieder (1975–1976, described as a "fragmentary song accompaniment"), cuts and dissolves for orchestra (1976–1977), Bagatelles (1977–1978), Lenz-Fragmente (1980), or more recently Fetzen (Scraps) for string quartet and accordion (1999–2004)

== Works ==
=== Stage works ===
- Faust und Yorick, chamber opera (1976)
- Jakob Lenz, chamber opera in one act, based on the 1836 novel of the same name by Georg Büchner (1977–1978)
- Tutuguri, ballet (Poème dansé), after Antonin Artaud (1980)
- Die Hamletmaschine, Musiktheater, music theater piece in five parts, based on the play by Heiner Muller (1983–1986)
- Oedipus, Msiktheater, music drama in two parts, based on Sophocles' Oedipus Rex (1986–1987)
- Die Eroberung von Mexico, opera in four acts, based on Antonin Artaud's "La conquête du Mexique" (1987–1991)
- Séraphin, after Antonin Artaud (1993–1994)
- Das Gehege, monodrama (2004–2005)
- Proserpina, monodrama (2008)
- Dionysos, opera fantasy, based on the Dionysian Dithyrambs by Nietzsche (2009–2010)

=== Orchestral works ===
- Form / 2 Formen (second state)
- Gejagte Form (first version)
- Gejagte Form (second version)
- IN-SCHRIFT (1995)
- Jagden und Formen (1995–2001)
- Ernster Gesang (1996)
- Symphony No. 1, Op. 3
- Symphony No. 2 (first and last movement)
- Dis-Kontur for large orchestra
- Sub-Kontur for large orchestra
- Vers une symphonie fleuve I–IV
- In-schrift 2 (2013)
- Dunkles Spiel, for small orchestra
- Schwarzer und roter Tanz, a fragment from Tutuguri (1983)
- Verwandlung (2002–2013)
- Gruß-Moment (2015)
- Gruß-Moment 2 "In Memoriam Pierre Boulez" (2016)

=== Concertante ===
- Violin
  - Lichtzwang
  - Gesungene Zeit
  - Lichtes Spiel
  - Coll'arco
- Viola
  - Viola Concerto
  - Viola Concerto No. 2
- Cello
  - Konzert in einem Satz
  - Monodram
  - Styx und Lethe
  - Concerto en Sol (2018)
- String quartet
  - "Concerto"
- Clarinet
  - Musik für Klarinette und Orchester
- Oboe
  - Musik für Oboe und Orchester
- Bassoon
  - Psalmus
- Trumpet
  - Gebild
  - Marsyas, Rhapsodie für Trompete mit Schlagzeug und Orchester
- Trombone
  - Canzona per sonare
- Piano
  - Piano Concerto (1969)
  - Sphere
  - Sotto voce, a notturno for piano and small orchestra
  - Sotto voce 2, a capriccio for piano and small orchestra
  - Piano Concerto No. 2 (2014)
- Harp
  - Die Stücke des Sängers
- Organ
  - Unbenannt IV
- Mixed instruments
  - Erster Doppelgesang, for viola, cello and orchestra
  - Zweiter Doppelgesang, for clarinet, cello, and orchestra
  - Dritter Doppelgesang, for clarinet, viola, and orchestra

=== Chamber works ===
- Chiffre-Zyklus
  - Chiffre I (1982)
  - Nach-Schrift (eine Chriffre) (1982/2004)
  - Silence to be beaten (Chiffre II) (1983)
  - Chiffre III (1983)
  - Chiffre IV (1983/84)
  - Chiffre V (1984)
  - Bild (eine Chiffre) (1984)
  - Chiffre VI (1984)
  - Chiffre VII (1985)
  - Chiffre VIII (1985/88)
- Hekton for violin and piano (1972)
- Interscriptum for string quartet and piano (2000-02)
- Fetzen (Shreds) 1-8, for string quartet and accordion (1999-2004)
- Am Horizont (In the Horizon) for violin, cello, and accordion (1991)
- Four Studies for Clarinet Quintet (2002)
- Dyade for violin and contrabass

=== String quartet ===
- Grave
- Quartettstudie
- String Quartet No. 1
- String Quartet No. 2
- String Quartet No. 3 "Im Innersten"
- String Quartet No. 4
- String Quartet No. 5
- String Quartet No. 6
- String Quartet No. 7
- String Quartet No. 8
- String Quartet No. 9 "Quartettsatz"
- String Quartet No. 10
- String Quartet No. 11
- String Quartet No. 12
- String Quartet No. 13

=== Vocal works ===
- Voice and orchestra
  - Fünf Abgesangsszenen
  - Drei späte Gedichte von Heiner Müller
  - Ernster Gesang mit Lied
  - Frau / Stimme
  - Hölderlin-Fragmente
  - Lenz-Fragmente
  - Penthesilea Monolog
  - Rilke: Vier Gedichte

==== Voice and piano ====
- Gesänge, Op. 1 (1968–71)
  - "Untergang" (Georg Trakl)
  - "Geistliche Dämmerung" (Trakl)
  - "Hälfte des Lebens" (Friedrich Hölderlin)
  - "Hochsommerbann" (Oskar Loerke)
  - "Abend" (August Stramm)
  - "Patrouille" (Stramm)
  - "Kriegsgrab" (Stramm)
  - "Sturmangriff" (Stramm)
  - "Lied" (Stefan George)
  - "Frühling" (Franz Büchler)
  - "Verzweifelt" (Stramm)
  - "Robespierre" (Georg Heym)
  - "Vorfrühling" (Reiner Maria Rilke)
- Vier Gedichte aus "Atemwende" (Paul Celan) (1973)
- Alexanderlieder (1975/76) for mezzo-soprano, baritone and two pianos. (Ernst Herbeck)
- Hölderlin-Fragmente (1976/77) piano version
- Neue Alexanderlieder (1979) (Herbeck) for baritone
- Lenz-Fragmente (1980) for tenor
- Wölfli-Liederbuch (1980/81) bass-baritone & piano, with optional episodes for 2 bass drums (orch. version 1982)
- Das Rot (Karoline von Gunderrode) (1990)
- Vier Gedichte von Peter Härtling (1993)
- Drei Gedichte von Monique Thoné (1997)
- Apokryph (1997) (deathbed words attributed to Georg Büchner)
- Nebendraußen (1998) (Hermann Lenz)
- Ende der Handschrift. Elf späte Gedichte von Heiner Müller (1999)
- Rilke: 4 Gedichte (2000)
- Sechs Gedichte von Friedrich Nietzsche (2001)
- Lavant-Gesänge (2000–01), on five poems by Christine Lavant
- Brentano-Phantasie (2002) (Clemens Brentano)
- Eins und doppelt. Fünf Lieder aus dem Zwielicht, for baritone and piano. (2005)
  - Abendempfindung (Arnim)
  - Gingo biloba (Goethe)
  - Dämmrung senkte sich von oben (Goethe)
  - Ausgang (Fontane)
  - Worte sind der Seele Bild (Goethe)
- Drei Hölderlin-Gedichte (2004)
  - Abbitte
  - Hälfte des Lebens
  - An Zimmern
- 2 Sprüche (2005) (Friedrich Schiller)
- Heine zu "Seraphine" (2006), seven poems by Heinrich Heine
- Goethe-Lieder (Johann Wolfgang von Goethe, 30'), 2004–07
1. An Zelter
2. Gingo biloba
3. Dämerung senkte sich von oben
4. Worte sind der Seele Bild
5. Phänomen
6. Selige Sehnsucht
7. Parabase
8. Lebensgenuss
9. Höchste Gunst
10. Heut und ewig
11. Aus "Wilhelm Meisters Wanderjahren"
12. Willst du dir ein gut Leben zimmern
13. An Zelter
- Wortlos (2007)
- Vier späte Gedichte von Friedrich Rückert baritone, 2008
- Zwei Gedichte von Joseph Eichendorff (2009)
- Zwei kleine Lieder (Eduard Mörike, 2009)
- Auf dem See for tenor (or high baritone) and piano (Conrad Ferdinand Meyer)

=== Choral works ===
- Choir a cappella
  - Sieben Passions-Texte
- Choir with orchestra or ensemble
  - Dies, an oratorio for four soloists, two speakers, mixed choir, speaking choir, children's choir, organ and orchestra
  - Deus Passus, a passion for five soloists, choir, and orchestra
  - Astralis
  - Et Lux, for vocal quartet and string quartet
  - Vigilia
  - Symphony No. 3, for soprano, baritone, choir, and orchestra
  - Départ, for mixed choir, speaking choir, and 22 instrumentalists
  - Requiem-Strophen (2017)

=== Solo instruments ===
- Grat (cello)
- Über die Linie (cello)
- Über die Linie VII (violin)

=== Piano solo ===
- Auf einem anderen Blatt
- Brahmsliebewalzer
- Klavierstücke nos. 1–7 1970–80
- Ländler 1979
- Nachstudie
- Zwiesprache 1999

=== Organ solo ===
- Drei Fantasien
