= William Dooley =

American singer (1932–2019)

William Dooley (September 9, 1932 – July 2, 2019) was an American bass-baritone singer who performed with many prominent opera companies. He began his career in Germany in the late 1950s, ultimately becoming a leading performer at the Deutsche Oper Berlin from 1962 to 1964. He then embarked on a highly successful career at the Metropolitan Opera where he sang regularly between 1964 and 1977. Between 1977 and 1982 he sang in 19 performances at the Vienna State Opera, after which he remained active as a freelance artist on the international stage through the early 1990s.

Dooley possessed a rich, deep, and warm voice that had a considerable amount of dramatic power and a wide vocal range. In his prime singing years he particularly excelled within the operas of Richard Wagner and Richard Strauss. Although primarily an exponent of German opera, his repertoire spanned a wide range of languages from French and Italian to Russian and even, in the case of the opera Montezuma, Aztec, Spanish and Latin. He sang in numerous world premieres throughout his career, including Hans Werner Henze's The Bassarids.

== Biography ==
Dooley entered the University of Rochester in 1950, graduating from there in 1954 with a bachelor's degree in English. During that time he also studied singing as a music minor under Lucy Lee Callund at the Eastman School of Music. After graduation he enlisted in the United States Army, serving in Munich between 1954 and 1956. During his off duty hours he studied singing with Viktoria Prestel and Hedwig Fichtmüller.

Dooley made his professional opera debut in 1957 as Posa in Giuseppe Verdi's Don Carlos at the Stadttheater Heidelberg. He spent the next two years performing in operas and concerts throughout Germany. He joined the roster at the Städtische Bühnen in Bielefeld in 1959, where he sang regularly for the next three years. While there he notably portrayed the title role in Marcel Mihalovici's one character opera Krapp, ou, La dernière bande for its world premiere broadcast on RTF radio in France on May 15, 1961, its stage premiere at the Théâtre des Nations the following July 3, and its premiere in Germany at the Städtische Bühnen in February 1962.

In the summer of 1962 Dooley became a member of the Deutsche Oper Berlin, where he sang leading baritone roles for two years. While there he notably sang the role of Apollo in the world premiere of Darius Milhaud's L'Orestie in 1963 and the role of Hernán Cortez in the world premiere of Roger Sessions's Montezuma in 1964. He was also well known in Germany for his interpretation of the role of Jago in Verdi's Otello which he sang in Bonn and many other German opera houses and abroad with great success.

Dooley returned to the United States in 1964 to become a member of the company at the Metropolitan Opera in New York City. He made his debut with the company in the title role of Eugene Onegin on February 15, 1964, opposite Leontyne Price as Tatiana. He spent the next 13 years singing with the company for a total of 188 performances. He particularly excelled in the works of Richard Wagner during his time at the Met, portraying the roles of Amfortas in Parsifal, Gunther in Götterdämmerung, Donner in Das Rheingold, Herald in Lohengrin, Kurwenal in Tristan und Isolde, and the title role in The Flying Dutchman.

In 1966 Dooley notably sang the role of The Messenger of Keikobad in the Met's first production of Richard Strauss's Die Frau ohne Schatten, and in 1976 he portrayed Marquis de la Force in the Met's first production of Francis Poulenc's Dialogues of the Carmelites with Maria Ewing as Blanche de la Force. His other roles during his career at the Met included the four villains in Les Contes d'Hoffmann, Amonasro in Aida, Count Almaviva in Le Nozze di Figaro, Don Pizarro in Fidelio, Escamillo in Carmen, Faninal in Der Rosenkavalier, the Grand Inquisitor in Don Carlo, John the Baptist in Salome, Mandryka in Arabella, the Music Master in Ariadne auf Naxos, Orest in Elektra, Rangoni in Boris Godunov, Scarpia in Tosca, the Speaker in The Magic Flute, and the title role in Wozzeck. His last performance at the Met was on March 11, 1977, as the Marquis de la Force.

During his time at the Met, Dooley occasionally performed with other companies and at music festivals internationally. In 1964 he made his debut at the Salzburg Festival as the title hero in Mozart's Lucio Silla. He returned to Salzburg two years later to portray the Captain of the Royal Guard in the world premiere of Hans Werner Henze's The Bassarids and the role of Escamillo in Carmen. In 1965 he sang in the world premiere of Isang Yun's Der Traum des Liu-Tung at the Akademie der Künste in Berlin. Dooley made two appearances with the Philadelphia Lyric Opera Company in 1968, portraying Wolfram von Eschenbach in Wagner's Tannhäuser with Jess Thomas in the title role and Count Almaviva to Pilar Lorengar's Countess. He also made several appearances at the Royal Danish Theatre in Copenhagen during the late 1960s. In 1976 he returned to the Deutsche Oper Berlin to sing in the world premiere of Toshiro Mayuzumi's Der Tempelbrand.

Dooley made his debut at the Vienna State Opera in the Fall of 1977. He sang there sporadically for the next six seasons in seven roles. In 1979 he portrayed the role of Pastor Oberlin in the world premiere of Wolfgang Rihm's Jakob Lenz at the Hamburg State Opera. In 1984 he appeared in the world premiere of Aribert Reimann's Die Gespenstersonate at the Deutsche Oper Berlin and in 1989 he sang in the world premiere of Marc Neikrug's Los Alamos at the Los Angeles Opera. In 1991 he portrayed Tiresias in the American premiere of Wolfgang Rihm's Oedipus at the Santa Fe Opera, a role he had created in the opera's 1987 premiere in Berlin.

Dooley died in Modesto, California, at age 86 in 2019.
