= Lenz (fragment) =

Literary fragment by Georg Büchner

Lenz is a novella fragment written by Georg Büchner in Strasbourg in 1836. It is based on the documentary evidence of Jean Frédéric Oberlin's diary. An incident in the life of German-language writer Jakob Michael Reinhold Lenz is the subject of the story. In March 1776, Lenz had met Goethe in Weimar. In the fall, Lenz was sent away from the Weimar court and he traveled to Oberlin's vicarage in the Steintal, apparently undergoing a mental health crisis. The story is concerned with the mental health crisis that Lenz experienced, during which he seemingly attempted suicide several times. Although left unfinished at the time of Büchner's death in 1837, it has been seen as a precursor to literary modernism. Its influence on later writers has been immense. The story has been adapted for the stage as Jakob Lenz, a 1978 chamber opera by Wolfgang Rihm.

== Editions in English ==
- Lenz. Translated by Michael Hamburger. West Newbury: Frontier Press, 1969.
- Woyzeck and Lenz. Translated by Hedwig Rappolt. New York: TSL Press, 1988.
- Lenz. Translated by Richard Sieburth. Brooklyn: Archipelago Books, 2005. ISBN 0-9749680-2-1.
- Complete Works and Letters, pp. 139–162. Translated by Henry J. Schmidt. New York: Continuum, 1986. ISBN 0-8264-0301-8.
- Complete Plays and Prose, pp. 139–166. Translated by Carl Richard Mueller. New York: Hill and Wang, 1963. ISBN 0-8090-0727-4.

== Film adaptation ==
Alexandre Rockwell wrote, directed, produced and edited a feature-length adaptation of Lenz in 1982. It was his debut film.
