= Et Lux =

Studio album by Wolfgang Rihm
- Released: March 27, 2015
- Recorded: February 2014
- Studio: Augustinus Muziekcentrum; Antwerp, Belgium
- Genre: Classical; chamber; choral
- Length: 1:01:30
- Label: ECM New Series 2404
- Producer: Manfred Eicher

Wolfgang Rihm chronology
Symphonie "Nähe Fern" (2013)	Et Lux (2015)	Ultimum - New A Cappella Music (2016)

Professional ratings
Review scores
Source	Rating
The Guardian	4/5 stars

Et Lux is a classical and choral album by German composer Wolfgang Rihm recorded in February 2014 by the Huelgas Ensemble with the Minguet Quartett, conducted by Paul Van Nevel, and released on the ECM New Series March the following year.

== Composition ==
Like Rihm's participation in the Requiem of Reconciliation, the album is a reworking of the Roman Catholic mass for the dead.

In Et Lux he uses a few specific text fragments from the mass, for example “et lux perpetua luceat” (and let perpetual light shine upon them) used to pray for eternal light for the deceased, which appear as components of a progressively realized whole.

On the album, the conductor, Paul Van Nevel, doubled the vocal part.

== Reception ==
In The Guardian, Kate Molleson gave the album four stars and says that "this music treads the line of tangibility, with sudden rushes of anger or fondness and the messy half-memories that come with grief.... Conductor Paul van Nevel doubles the vocal parts to create broad, generous textures that sound lovely and lush against the strings' icy clarity—all qualities that ECM's engineers are expert at capturing."

In Gramophone, Arnold Whittall said that "while some of the more austere episodes might strain the listener's concentration, they are set against eruptive, even melodramatic passages that demonstrate Rihm's special ability to make something distinctively edgy out of meditation and reflection."

== Track listing ==
All tracks are written by Wolfgang Rihm.

No.	Title	Length
1.	"Et lux"	1:01:30

== Personnel ==
- Paul Van Nevel – conductor
  - Huelgas Ensemble
    - Axelle Bernage, Sabine Lutzenberger, – soprano
    - Terry Wey, Achim Schulz – tenor
    - Stefan Berghammer, Matthew Vine – tenor
    - Tim Whitheley, Guillaume Orly – bass
  - Minguet Quartett
    - Ulrich Isfort – violin
    - Annette Reisinger – violin
    - Aroa Sorin – viola
    - Matthias Diener – violoncello
