= Friedrich Meyer-Oertel =

German opera director (1936–2021)

- Born: 3 April 1936; Leipzig
- Died: 14 March 2021 (aged 84)
- Education: Musikakademie, Vienna (composition and oboe); Universität Wien (musicology)
- Occupations: Stage director; Opera director
- Years active: 1968 – 1972: Staatstheater Mainz; 1974 – 1979: Nationaltheater Mannheim; 1979 – 1996: Opernhaus Wuppertal; 1996 – 2004: Staatstheater Darmstadt

Friedrich Meyer-Oertel (3 April 1936 – 14 March 2021) was a German opera director. After positions at Staatstheater Mainz, Nationaltheater Mannheim, Opernhaus Wuppertal and Staatstheater Darmstadt, he was active as a freelance stage director.

== Career ==
Born in Leipzig, Meyer-Oertel studied in Vienna, commercial art as well as composition and oboe at the Musikakademie, and musicology at the Universität Wien in Vienna. First, he was a stage assistant at the Wiener Staatsoper and Staatsoper Stuttgart, among others, before working at the Staatstheater Mainz as Oberspielleiter from 1968 to 1972. He was active in the same position at the Nationaltheater Mannheim from 1974 to 1979. From 1979 to 1996 he was director of the Opernhaus Wuppertal, where he worked intensively with stage designer Hanna Jordan and others, and from 1996 to 2004 director at the Staatstheater Darmstadt.

His most famous productions include Don Giovanni and Boris Godunov at the Finnish National Opera, Giuseppe Verdi's Don Carlo at the Royal Swedish Opera in Stockholm, Othello and Les vêpres siciliennes in Darmstadt. In 1981 he staged Wagner's early Die Feen at the Opernhaus Wuppertal. He also staged Wagner's Tannhäuser in Gothenburg, Der Ring des Nibelungen in Wuppertal and Mannheim, Weber's Der Freischütz at the Oper Köln, Richard Strauss' Elektra at the Opéra Royal de Wallonie, Johann Strauss's operetta Eine Nacht in Venedig at the Komische Oper Berlin, and Igor Stravinsky's The Rake's Progress in Barcelona. He staged in Mannheim also Schoenberg's Moses und Aron and the premiere of Wolfgang Rihm's Die Hamletmaschine in 1987.

His special interest in Leoš Janáček led to productions of Jenůfa at Montpellier, Liège, Monte Carlo and Bordeaux, Káťa Kabanová in Wuppertal and The Makropulos Affair in Darmstadt.

In 2012 he directed at the Israeli Opera Mussorgsky's Boris Godunov.

== Death ==
He died aged 84 on 14 March 2021.
