= William Pell (tenor) =

American opera singer (1947–2003)

Pell in Parsifal at the 1989 Bayreuth Festival

William R. Pell (August 16, 1947 – July 26, 2003) was an American opera singer who had a major international career during the 1980s and 1990s. He began his career as a baritone in the early 1970s before transitioning into the dramatic tenor repertoire in 1975. He was particularly admired for his interpretations of the works of Richard Wagner.

== Early years ==
Born in Denver, Colorado, Pell attended high school in Indianapolis, Indiana, where the 6 ft 5 in (195.5 cm) youth played basketball while taking voice lessons at the urging of his mother, Helen Pell. He then studied at the Peabody Conservatory (1965–1967) and the Jacobs School of Music at Indiana University Bloomington (1967–1970). While at IU he performed in student productions of Andrea Chénier (Roucher), Deidamia (Fenice), L'italiana in Algeri (Haly), and Love on Trial (Count Asdrubale). After graduation, Pell was drafted into the U.S. Army, where he sang with an Army ensemble and band. Pell then moved to New York City, where he pursued graduate studies at the Manhattan School of Music and sang as a baritone with the professional choir of nearby Riverside Church, under the direction of Frederick Swann.

== Career in opera ==
Pell began performing in professional operas with mostly secondary houses throughout North America during the early 1970s as a baritone. He notably sang Figaro in Mozart's The Marriage of Figaro with the Canadian Opera Company and Germont in Verdi's La Traviata in San Francisco. In 1975 he made his first foray into the tenor repertoire with a portrayal of Rodolfo in Puccini's La bohème. In 1977 he became an Affiliate Artist at San Francisco Opera where he sang the role of the officer in Ariadne auf Naxos by Richard Strauss and Procolo in Donizetti's Le convenienze ed inconvenienze teatrali.

In the late 1970s he went to Europe where his career thrived. From 1982–1989 he was a principal tenor at the Deutsche Oper Berlin where he was much admired in Wagner roles. He notably starred in the world premiere of Wolfgang Rihm's Oedipus on October 4, 1987, which was broadcast on German television. Music reviewer John Holland said Pell sang his challenging part's "high tessitura without any sign of distress". He also performed with the company in performances of Rudolf Kelterborn's Ophelia at the Schwetzingen Festival. He had two major triumphs with the company in 1988 as Siegfried in Wagner's Ring Cycle and Váňa Kudrjáš in Janáček's Káťa Kabanová.

Pell was also highly active as a guest artist with opera companies on the international stage. In 1980 he returned to the Canadian Opera Company to sing Laca Klemeň in Janáček's Jenůfa and in 1981 he returned to the San Francisco Opera to portray Romeo in Gounod's Roméo et Juliette. At Oper Frankfurt he sang in the world premiere of Hans Zender's Stephen Climax on June 15, 1986. He had a major triumph at the Festival dei Due Mondi in the title role of Wagner's Parsifal in 1987, returning there the following year to sing Laca Klemeň. In 1988 he was an admired Bacchus in Ariadne auf Naxos at the Teatro Lirico Giuseppe Verdi in Trieste and gave successful performances of Alwa in Alban Berg's Lulu at the Teatro Carlo Felice and Staatsoper Hannover.

Pell gave several performances at the Bayreuth Festival where he was heard as Parsifal (1989) and as Walther in Tannhäuser (1989–1991). In 1990 he sang Florestan in Beethoven's Fidelio in Trieste and returned to Frankfurt to perform in York Höller's The Master and Margarita. He also performed Parsifal at the Spoleto Festival that year, with The New York Times music critic Donal Henahan calling his performance, "believable and bright-toned". Pell also made several guest appearances at the De Nederlandse Opera, Staatsoper Stuttgart, La Fenice, and the Teatro dell'Opera di Roma during his career. Other roles in his extensive repertoire included Desportes in Zimmermann's Die Soldaten, Jean in Antonio Bibalo's Miss Julie, Matteo in Arabella by Richard Strauss, and Zinoviy Borisovich Izmailov in Shostakovich's Lady Macbeth of the Mtsensk District.

== Death and legacy ==
Having never retired, Pell died in Nashville, Tennessee, on July 26, 2003 at the age of 55. His remains are interred in the columbarium of the Cathedral of St. John the Divine in New York City, where he often sang. He is survived by his ex-wife, Andrea, a professional ballerina, and a son, Christopher, who is principal clarinetist of the Cincinnati Symphony Orchestra, as of 2025. Pell's voice is preserved on a complete opera recording of Tannhäuser made in 1988 under the direction of Giuseppe Sinopoli and on Messe für Soli, Chor und Orchester by Wolfgang von Schweinitz. Some of Pell's solos sung at Riverside Church in the mid-1970s can still be heard on the Sacred Classics radio program, such as his rendition of The Palms by Jean-Baptiste Faure. Pell's performance of Wolfgang Rihm's Oedipus, televised in 1987, was released by Arthaus on DVD in 2013.
