= Hamletmachine =

1977 postmodernist drama by Heiner Müller

- Original title: Die Hamletmaschine
- Original language: German
- Written by: Heiner Müller
- Based on: Hamlet by William Shakespeare

Premiere
- Date: November 7, 1978
- Place: Brussels
- Directed by: Marc Liebens

Hamletmachine (German: Die Hamletmaschine) is a postmodernist drama by German playwright and theatre director Heiner Müller, loosely based on Hamlet by William Shakespeare. It was written in 1977, and is related to a translation of Shakespeare's Hamlet that Müller undertook. Some critics claim the play problematizes the role of intellectuals during the era of Communism in East Germany; others argue that the play should be understood in relation to wider post-modern concepts. Hamletmachine is not centered on a conventional plot, but is partially unified through sequences of monologues in which the protagonist leaves his role and reflects on being an actor.

== Overview ==
The play is constituted of scenes. The whole text is roughly nine pages long. The script itself is extremely dense and open to interpretation; recurring themes include feminism and the ecology movement.

The play remains Müller's most-often performed and (arguably) his best-known today; Müller himself directed a seven-and-a-half-hour performance of Hamlet (in which Die Hamletmaschine was the play-within-a-play) in Berlin in 1990.

== Performance history ==
Hamletmachine had its world premiere in 1978, november 7 by the Ensemble théâtral mobile of Brussel, in a production directed by Marc Liebens, in the Michel Dezoteux's Théâtre élémentaire.

The play was then presented in 1979 at Théâtre Gérard Philipe in Saint-Denis, France. The U.S. premiere of the play was performed in March 1984 by Freies Theater München at the University of South Florida. This was followed in December of the same year by a production at the Theater for the New City in New York and in May 1986 by a production at New York University, which was directed by Robert Wilson.

The British premiere was on March 7, 1985, at the Gate Theatre in London, in a double bill with Heiner Müller's Mauser, both directed by Paul Brightwell, who had previously directed a student production of Müller's Cement at the University of Essex. The production of Hamletmachine was described as "a stage teeming with images" and "an electrifying message from East Germany" by Nicholas De Jongh in The Guardian.

In 1992, the play was presented by the University of California, Irvine, directed by Keith Fowler, as a bloody fantasy set in a "Frankenstein laboratory," in which industrial meat hooks served to "float" Ophelia. In 2002, the Los Angeles Times published a 35-year retrospective of cutting edge art "on the wilder side," and UC Irvine's Hamletmachine was one of five "bloodiest" events listed.

In 1992 Josef Szeiler and Aziza Haas elaborated the Hamletmachine in Tokyo in parallel to a production of Hamlet by the Tokyo Engeki Ensemble, known for its traditional Brecht adaptations, which was confronted with the open and experimental approach Szeiler and Haas had first developed as members of TheaterAngelusNovus. The project resulted in a new translation of Hamletmachine into Japanese and 15 experimental performances ranging from 45 minutes to 12 hours. It was documented in the book HamletMaschine.Tokyo.Material.

In 2007 it was performed in the Samuel Beckett Theatre in Dublin, Ireland, directed by Paul Carton.

In 2010, Wang Chong directed the first production of Hamletmachine in China. References to the Chinese and North Korean political situations caused controversy. However, the show toured Beijing and Hangzhou without getting banned. The show was performed by four Chinese opera actors and one child. Critics called it "deconstructed Chinese opera" and "the most exciting work at the Beijing International Fringe Festival".

In 2016 Vitalyi Goltsov directed the first production of Hamletmachine in Ukraine. It was in Chernihiv Teatre of puppets. In 2020 director Roza Sarkisyan and writer Joanna Wichowska collaborated on a new production entitled H-Effect, which combined this play and Hamlet in a postdramatic theatre production.

== Adaptations ==
Hamletmachine has had various adaptations in other media:

- Hamletmachine, a radio drama, including music by Einstürzende Neubauten, which was released as a compact disc in 1991. Blixa Bargeld played the part of Prince Hamlet and Gudrun Gut played Ophelia.
- Die Hamletmaschine-Oratorio, an oratorio by composer Georges Aperghis
- Die Hamletmaschine, a 1987 opera by Wolfgang Rihm
- Szenische Kammermusik nach Heiner Müllers “Hamletmaschine”, a 1991 classical piece for five instruments by Ruth Zechlin
- Hamletmachine: A Non-Long Movie, a 2010 short film by Barcelona filmmaker Agustin Calderon. In 2016, the film was released on the website Vimeo.

== Works influenced by Hamletmachine ==
Opheliamachine, a postmodernist response to Heiner Mueller's Hamletmachine by the Polish-born American playwright and dramaturg Magda Romanska, premiered to critical acclaim at City Garage Theatre in Santa Monica, CA in 2013, opened at the Berliner Ensemble in Germany on September 30, 2022, and was published in nine languages by Bloomsbury in 2024.

== Recordings ==
- Die Hamletmaschine (with Blixa Bargeld), Rough Records 1991
- Maschine (by Ester Brinkmann), Supposé 1998
