= Renate Behle =

Austrian opera singer (born 1945)

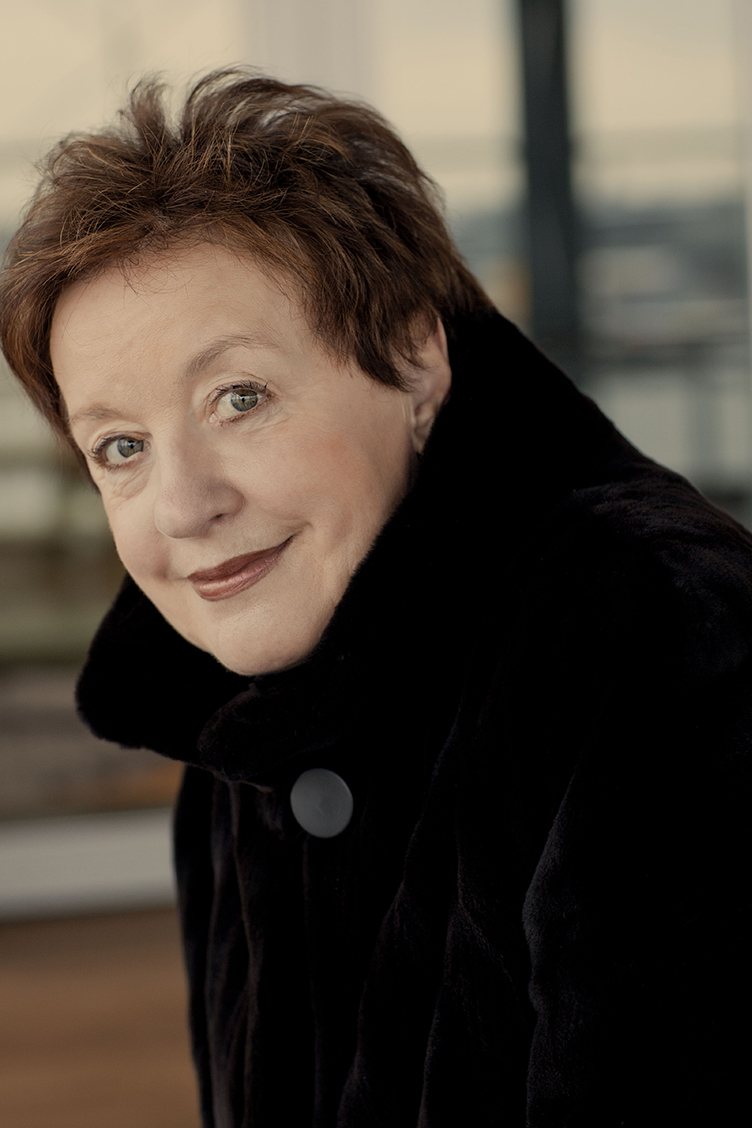
- Behle in 2010
- Born: Renate Summer; 3 April 1945 (age 80); Graz, Austria
- Education: University of Graz
- Occupations: Operatic mezzo-soprano and soprano; Academic
- Organizations: Hochschule für Musik und Theater Hamburg
- Website: renatebehle.de

Renate Behle (née Summer; born 3 April 1945) is an Austrian operatic mezzo-soprano and soprano who made an international career, based in Germany. She was professor of voice at the Hochschule für Musik und Theater Hamburg from 2000 to 2010.

== Career ==
Born in Graz, Behle studied voice there and in Rome for six years. In parallel, she also studied history and philosophy at the University of Graz. Her first engagement as a lyric mezzo-soprano was in 1968 at the Badisches Staatstheater Karlsruhe, where she performed several trousers roles. In 1971, she married an oboist of the NDR and only performed in guest roles, such as Dorabella in Mozart's Così fan tutte at the Stadttheater Klagenfurt, as Cherubino in his Le nozze di Figaro at the Theater Hagen, and as the Gymnasiast (schoolboy) in Berg's Lulu in Lisbon and Graz. When their son Daniel was born in 1974, she took a position as first alto in the NDR Chor to have more time for her family. During that period, she performed as a soloist in concerts and recitals.

From 1979, she was again a lyric mezzo-soprano, now at the Musiktheater im Revier in Gelsenkirchen, where she performed roles such as Penelope in Monteverdi's Il ritorno d'Ulisse in patria, the title role of Bizet's Carmen, Maddalena in Verdi's Rigoletto, Olga in Tchaikovsky's Eugen Onegin, the Composer in Ariadne auf Naxos by Richard Strauss, Hänsel in Humperdinck's Hänsel und Gretel, and Rosina in Rossini's Der Barbier von Sevilla which she also sang at the Hamburgische Staatsoper, stepping in for Agnes Baltsa. From 1981, she performed as a member of the Staatsoper Hannover where she stayed for 15 years, singing more dramatic roles such as Eboli in Verdi's Don Carlos. In 1987, she appeared at the Landestheater Detmold as Sieglinde in Wagner's Die Walküre, her first soprano role.

In 1995, she appeared in the title role of Salome at La Scala in Milan and in 2001 at the Metropolitan Opera in New York City in the title role of Beethoven's Fidelio, a role which she also performed at the Vienna State Opera, the Semperoper in Dresden, and the Salzburg Festival. She returned to mezzo-soprano roles in 2007.

On 9 February 1992, she participated in the premiere of Wolfgang Rihm's Die Eroberung von Mexico at the Hamburgische Staatsoper. Other roles in contemporary opera included Regine in the German premiere of Rolf Liebermann's La Forêt (The Forest) at the Schwetzingen Festival in 1988 and repeated at the Oper Frankfurt, Kassandra in Aribert Reimann's Troades, and Agave in Henze's Die Bassariden in Hamburg and the Bavarian State Opera. In 2017, she appeared as Sara in the premiere of Giorgio Battistelli's opera Lot at the Staatsoper Hannover, alongside Franz Mazura as Abraham.

Since 1971, Behle has lived in Hamburg, where she taught as professor of voice at the Hochschule für Musik und Theater Hamburg from 2000 to 2010.

== Recordings ==
Recordings by Behle are held by the German National Library, including several CDs:

- Zemlinsky: Der Kreidekreis, conducted by Stefan Soltész
- Louis Spohr: Jessonda (Gerd Albrecht)
- Schumann: Genoveva (Gerd Albrecht)
- Schoeck: Penthesilea (Mario Venzago)
- Wolfgang Rihm: Die Eroberung von Mexico (Ingo Metzmacher)
- Beethoven: Ninth Symphony (Michael Gielen)

She appears on two DVDs of Stuttgart opera productions:

- Beethoven: Fidelio (Michael Gielen, staged by Martin Kušej)
- Wagner: Die Walküre (Lothar Zagrosek, Christof Nel)
