= Andreas Schmidt (baritone) =

German opera singer

- Born: 30 June 1960 (age 64); Düsseldorf, Germany
- Occupations: Classical bass-baritone; Academic voice teacher
- Organizations: Deutsche Oper Berlin; Hochschule für Musik und Theater München
- Awards: Kammersänger

Andreas Schmidt (born 30 June 1960 in Düsseldorf) is a German classical bass-baritone in opera and concert.

== Career ==
Andreas Schmidt studied church music with his father Hartmut Schmidt and singing with Ingeborg Reichelt and Dietrich Fischer-Dieskau.

His 1984 debut was in the part of Malatesta in Donizetti's Don Pasquale at the Deutsche Oper Berlin. He became a member of the opera house, appearing in Mozart roles such as Guglielmo in Così fan tutte or Count Almaviva in Le nozze di Figaro, as Wolfram in Wagner's Tannhäuser, Posa in Verdi's Don Carlos, and Marcello in Puccini's La Bohème. He created there the title role of Wolfgang Rihm's opera Oedipus in 1987 and the role of Ryuji in Hans Werner Henze's Das verratene Meer in 1990. He has appeared as a guest at the Hamburger Staatsoper, the Berlin State Opera, the Bavarian State Opera, the Vienna State Opera, the Grand Theátre Genf, the Royal Opera House Covent Garden, the Opéra de Paris, the Gran Teatre del Liceu Barcelona, La Scala Milano, and the Metropolitan Opera.

He has performed at the Bayreuth Festival, since 1996 the part of Beckmesser in Die Meistersinger von Nürnberg with Daniel Barenboim, later with Christian Thielemann, since 1997 Amfortas in Parsifal with Giuseppe Sinopoli, later Christoph Eschenbach, since 2005 Kurwenal in Tristan und Isolde.

As a concert singer he recorded several Bach cantatas and Bach's Mass in B minor, Christmas Oratorio and St John Passion with the Gächinger Kantorei and Helmuth Rilling. He recorded the bass part of Bach's St Matthew Passion several times, in 1986 with Colin Davis and the Symphonieorchester des Bayerischen Rundfunks, in 1993 with Peter Schreier as the Evangelist, the Westminster Symphonic Choir and the New York Philharmonic conducted by Kurt Masur, in 1997 with Schreier again and Claudio Abbado conducting the Tölzer Knabenchor, the Swedish Radio Choir and the Berlin Philharmonic, in 1998 with the Thomanerchor and the Gewandhausorchester Leipzig, conducted by Georg Christoph Biller. He performed the words of Jesus (Vox Christi) in the St Matthew Passion in 1988 with John Eliot Gardiner, the Monteverdi Choir and the English Baroque Soloists. With the Gächinger Kantorei he appeared in the premiere of Rihm's Deus Passus on 29 August 2000.

As a recitalist, he recorded for example Lieder of Johannes Brahms together with Juliane Banse, Iris Vermillion and pianist Helmut Deutsch.

He received the title Kammersänger in 1997. He has been teaching since 2005 at the Hochschule für Musik "Carl Maria von Weber" Dresden and was appointed professor in 2007. Starting in 2010 he is a teacher at the Hochschule für Musik und Theater München.

== Videography ==
- New Year's Eve Concert 1992: Richard Strauss Gala, conducted by Claudio Abbado. Kultur Video DVD, D4209, 2007
