= Reminiszenz =

2016 song cycle by Wolfgang Rihm

- Triptychon und Spruch in memoriam Hans Henny Jahnn
- Song cycle by Wolfgang Rihm
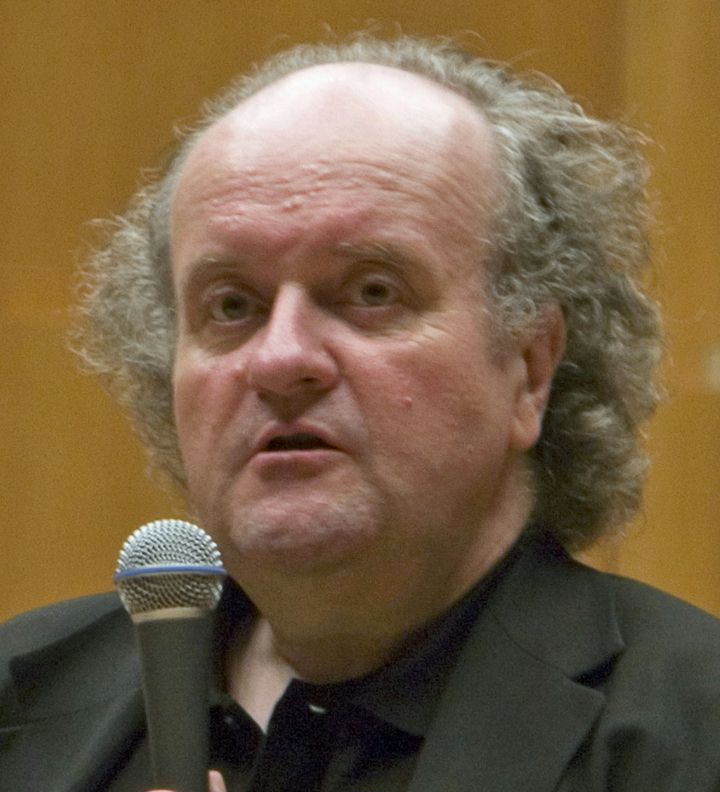
- Rihm in 2007
- Occasion: opening of the Elbphilharmonie
- Text: poems by Hans Henny Jahnn, Peter Huchel and Walter Muschg
- Language: German
- Composed: 2016
- Duration: 15 minutes
- Scoring: tenor; orchestra

Premiere
- Date: 11 January 2017
- Location: Elbphilharmonie, Hamburg

Reminiszenz is a song cycle for tenor and large orchestra by Wolfgang Rihm composed in 2016 for the opening of the Elbphilharmonie in Hamburg. It is subtitled Triptychon und Spruch in memoriam Hans Henny Jahnn, setting poems by Hans Henny Jahnn, Peter Huchel and Walter Muschg. It was premiered on 11 January 2017.

== History ==
Wolfgang Rihm received a commission from the NDR broadcaster to compose a work for the opening concert of the Elbphilharmonie in Hamburg. It was the only world premiere for this occasion.

He created a song cycle for tenor and large orchestra in 2016, based on four poems by Hans Henny Jahnn, a playwright, author and organ builder from Hamburg, Peter Huchel, a German poet, and Walter Muschg, a Swiss author. It is subtitled Triptychon und Spruch in memoriam Hans Henny Jahnn, in memory of Jahnn. The duration is given as 15 minutes.

The song cycle premiered at the Elbphilharmonie on 11 January 201, performed by tenor Pavol Breslik and the NDR Elbphilharmonie Orchestra conducted by Thomas Hengelbrock. A reviewer from The Guardian noted that the texts were bleak and the music "characteristically eclectic". A reviewer from the New York Times described the music as "rangy, difficult", "broody" and "arresting".
