= Opheliamachine =

- Written by: Magda Romanska
- Characters: Hamlet, Therapist/Talk Show Host, Ophelia-Writer
- Subject: Response to and polemic with the German playwright Heiner Mueller's Hamletmachine
- Genre: Postmodernist
- Setting: Cold War

Premiere
- Date: June 2013
- Place: City Garage Theatre Company

Opheliamachine is a postmodernist drama by the Polish-born American playwright and dramaturg, Magda Romanska. Written in the span of ten years, from 2002 to 2012, the play is a response to and polemic with the German playwright Heiner Mueller's Hamletmachine (in German, Die Hamletmaschine). Like Hamletmachine, Opheliamachine is loosely based on Hamlet, by William Shakespeare. The play originated in relation to Romanska's doctoral dissertation on the representation of death and femininity.

In Hamletmachine, Mueller deconstructs the impossible position of an Eastern European intellectual at the peak of the Cold War as well as the seemingly disappearing agency of the author. Likewise, Opheliamachine captures "the current historical moment with all its entrapments: the dissolution of national and gender identities, the loss of agency and the solipsism of contemporary lives in an increasingly fragmented—if connected—world, the brutal, animal-like quality of modern relationships, the collapse of a social order and its distinction, the chaos and violence that follows." (translated from Italian)

== Overview ==
Written in the tradition of such experimental texts as Pablo Picasso's The Four Little Girls (1946–47), Antoni Artaud's Jet of Blood (1925), or Alfred Jarry's Ubu Roi (1896), Opheliamachine is a collage, pastiche, conglomeration of images that rule over our modern, global, virtual sexuality. It is a postmodern tale of love and sex in a fragmented world of questionable values. Scholar Niki Tulk calls it "an Artaud-inspired pastiche with Ophelia presented as multiple characters, all exploring sexuality in a largely virtual, and globalized world."

Opheliamachine captures the dissolution of the national (local, sexual, etc.) identities leading to the kind of physical and psychological displacement that used to be the traditional immigrant, diasporic condition and which now has become the new normalized global mode of being, a new human condition. It was inspired by Witold Gombrowicz' concept of "filistria: the realm of displaced persons of uncertain gender and sexuality living in a postcolonial - and now postideological – world."

In a modern global world of unstable national and sexual identities, Hamlet and Ophelia are both what Fouad Ajami calls "children of the fault lines," "rootless residents" for whom "home is neither in the lands of their birth nor in the diaspora communities where people flee the fire and the failure of tormented places." Hamlet from Opheliamachine is the postmodern "nowhere man," who finds the comfort of belonging in the virtual reality of TV and the Internet, and "who [has] risen to war against the very messy world that forged [him]." Ophelia is split between contradictory drives and desires, turning to self-violence in a grotesque gesture of gender mockery.

In her introduction to the Bloomsburry edition of the play, "How to Lose a Guy in Ten Wars: Introduction to Opheliamachine," Ilinca Todorut, theatre scholar and critic, states:

In Opheliamachine, the landscape is a cemetery of things, a trash heap of objets d'art, rotting corpses, broken devices, and assorted detritus of Western civilization... Hamlet and Ophelia are represented by multiple characters, each in conflict with him- or herself and the other. The plot follows the courtship between Ophelia and Hamlet, their wedding day, their marriage settled into the routine of her-talking-while-working to a him-devouring-TV-on-a-couch. Along this narrative, bodies float, army boots clobber to death, babies are merchandise, mothers eat children's brains, gun shots splatter brains, flesh is set on fire. The usual. It is obviously a comedy... The play ends with the image of Ophelia lighting up a match as dusk falls. She may use it to torch Hamlet doused in gasoline, symbolic of the old world with its heroes, cultures and ideas that failed us; she may use it to guide us and Hamlet through the night.

Playwright Magda Romanska says in the introduction to the Italian translation that Opheliamachine "...was meant to be a response and a polemic with [Heiner] Mueller's Die Hamletmaschine. In Hamletmachine, Muller tries to deconstruct the impossible position of an Eastern European intellectual at the peak of the Cold War as well as the seemingly disappearing agency of the author. The gender, sex and violence are part of the equation, particularly in Germany which has been struggling to come to terms with its own historical glorification of raw power and masculinity." (translated from Italian) Maria Pia Pagani provides extensive critical analysis of the play, published in Mimesis, which states:

Opheliamachine reveals the complex experiences and feelings of a contemporary woman. Cruelly entrapped in a machine created by her own conscience, Ophelia exploits this to unravel her contradictions and those of our age. Showing no shame and making no comprises, Ophelia wants to be an authentic woman, but feels the continual danger of losing herself among the women milling at New York's Port Authority Bus Station. [...] Hamlet's failure to hit the target seems to suggest the dark despair of the potshot in Uncle Vanya. Today Doctor Chekov might say that this Hamlet in exile is suffering from: 'techno-solitude,' a global disease steadily taking more victims, particularly in America. (translated from Italian)

Returning to "How to Lose a Guy in Ten Wars: Introduction to Opheliamachine," Ilinca Todorut also declares:

Romanska tests with gusto the postdramatic's aptitude for intertextuality and self-referentiality, for language games and plastic use of story-telling clichés. Unexpected imagery explodes into the visual field freely and aggressively. Lines mix as in a salad bowl chopped references to feminist, postcolonial, media and political theory... Opheliamachine... rummages through the debris to reaffirm the sense of possibility and freedom within a postideological fluidity.

== Premiere ==
Opheliamachine premiered at City Garage Theatre in Los Angeles 14 June– 28 July 2013. It was directed by Frédérique Michel and produced and designed by Charles A. Duncombe, with the following cast:

Hamlet: Joss Glennie Smith

Therapist/Talk Show Host: Leah Harf

Ophelia/Writer: Kat Johnston

Ophelia/Fighter: Megan Kim

Ophelia/Traveler: Saffron Mazzia

Gertrude: Cynthia Mance

Horatio: RJ Jones

Founded in 1987, City Garage has since presented more than two dozen "Critic's Choice" or "Pick of the Week" productions. Its production history includes groundbreaking experimental texts by Neil LaBute, Sarah Kane, Heiner Mueller and Charles Mee.

== Performance history ==
On October 27, 2014, Opheliamachine received a staged reading at the experimental performance space, The Brick Theatre in Brooklyn, NY. The reading was directed by Jackson Gay (Yale School of Drama), with Patch Darragh as Hamlet, Danielle Slavick as Ophelia/Writer, Ceci Fernandez as Ophelia/Fighter, Sarah Sokolovic as Ophelia/Traveler and Jeanine Serralles as Gertrude.

Opheliamachine opened at the Berliner Ensemble in Germany on September 30, 2022. It was translated by Theresa Schlesinger and directed by Uršulė Barto. The assistant director was Kathinka Schroeder and the dramaturg was Jan-Stephan Schmieding. The cast included Nina Burns as Ophelia, Max Diehle as Hamlet, and Hilke Altefrohne as Gertrude.

Theaterkompass described the new production, saying,

In Magda Romanska's post-dramatic response to Müller, she tries to take control of the narrative as the author of her own fragmented history, as a lover and a madwoman, on a mountain of western values and commodities. Not an easy task: After all, Ophelia ended up in one of the most famous dysfunctional ruling families in the history of drama, in which the roles seem irrefutably fixed, her relationship with the Danish prince is asymmetrical and whose tragic outcome has long been known. In Opheliamaschine Romanska, an American writer with Polish roots, gives space to the female perspective on a complex and yet disturbingly traditional world. She traces the mechanisms of patriarchal structures in relationships in an associative and pointed manner, focusing on the vulnerability of body and mind. (translated from German)

In May 2024, students at Dhaka University, the oldest and largest public university in Bangladesh, staged a production of Opheliamachine at Natmandal, the department laboratory/auditorium. It was directed and translated into Bengali by Assistant Professor Somaiya Moni, and performed by Students of 5th Semester, 3rd Year BA Honours.

In June 2024, Sjoerd Eltink & Maja Brouwer included Opheliamachine in their show Ophelia: Splash Zone "a queer theatrical concert that investigates gender, humanity, repertoire and the necessities for self-expression," which was performed at Het Nationale Theater, the main theater company of The Hague in the Netherlands.

In June 2025, Opheliamachine was performed at the Theatro Garcia de Rezende in Évora, Portugal. The notes described the play:

On a stage torn between technological ruins, symbolic relics, and shards of collective memory, Opheliamachine unfolds: a storm of poetic delusions, intertwined narratives, and intimate confrontations. Inspired by Hamlet's Ophelia, this piece deconstructs the tragic figure of the silenced woman. Ophelia is no longer just the beloved who goes crazy and kills herself for love: she is all women, and none; she is the identity where all female voices merge: soldier, bride, corpse, and machine. She is a product, protest, pornography, and poetry. She is a Woman! While Hamlet watches the world passively, trapped between video games and emotional powerlessness, Ophelia writes. Write it down. Rewrites itself. Claiming her place in life, tearing every seam of the dress that binds her to an identity imposed by the place and duty of a woman in matters of affection, sex, and maternity. By merging voices, genders, technologies, and times, Opheliamachine questions women’s place in a world that consumes and recycles her as a defective product. In a scenario where everything collapses, which represents the world so perfectly these days, there is only one question left: How do you survive when your own body is an occupied territory?

== Critical reception ==
The City Garage production of Opheliamachine was critically acclaimed, receiving a slew of positive reviews from many LA-based media. Radio station KCRW (local NPR affiliate) picked Opheliamachine as "Thing to See" among "Five Things To Do" in LA over a 4 July weekend. In the podcast about the show, Anthony Byrnes said:

The play itself, written by Magda Romanska, is a series of scenes that explore the themes of femininity, power, sex, rage, love, and madness through a faceted portrayal of Ophelia. Our title character is split in three: we have Ophelia the Brain—typing away at a vintage typewriter complete with bell; Ophelia the terrorist clad in black fatigues with a .45 tucked into her bare midriff; and finally Ophelia the Mad confined to a wedding dress and, at times, a wheelchair. […] If you're looking for a play or a company that ties everything into neat little knots—this probably isn't for you. If you're willing to tackle a play as much as experience it—you won't be disappointed you spent 60 minutes in their world.

In the preview of the show, Jessica Rizzo in The Cultural Weekly wrote:

Romanska gives us an unsettling and internally conflicted picture of global gender relations. [...] She owes more to the tradition of astringently feminist, linguistically challenging playwriting which includes Sarah Kane and Elfriede Jelinek than she owes to Muller. A worthy heir to this legacy, Romanska carves out a space of critical resistance in Opheliamachine, a space where the ugliest and the most beautiful of our desires can exist, as they do in life, side by side, where the death-dealing and life-giving vie for dominance.

Myron Meisel, from The Hollywood Reporter, wrote:

Difficult comedy of ideas and ideologies honestly stimulates with its perceptiveness . . . . In this world premiere play at City Garage in Santa Monica, Magda Romanska consciously concocts both an homage to and critique of a landmark theatrical composition, 1979's Hamletmachine by Heiner Müller, the successor to Brecht as both director of the Berliner Ensemble and groundbreaking German experimental playwright. […] Since City Garage has been conscientious over its two decades in presenting Müller's work locally, it's appropriate that it should mount Romanska's fiercely meditative mirror, which quotes excerpts from Hamletmachine at the beginning and the end in both deference and defiance. […]

If the modern take on Hamlet is that his consciousness inhibits his ability to act, then the ironies of Opheliamachine posit that radical analysis can be the enemy of effective political action, or put another way, that gender awareness is no refuge from the truism that each of us must reckon ourselves as our own most implacable adversary. Romanska is a well-versed academic and accomplished dramaturg, and she heeds the cherished advice to write about what she knows. Thankfully, she has a vision comprehensive enough to relish irony and pose deeper questions than mere indictment. If the world might be viewed more rewardingly without the arbitrary distinctions between the sexes, those prejudices must be confronted if any substantive change is to be accomplished in the world as it is. Romanska dramatizes the wisdom that confrontation comprises only the first essential steps. [. . .] This funny yet brutal play needs the inventive mise-en-scene to support its fecundity of ideas amidst the tumult of its conflicting impulses. And don't be afraid: It is OK, even purgative, to laugh.

Philip Brandes of Los Angeles Times, praised the production:

An uncompromising vision. […] fiercely confrontational new play. […] In her own fashionably postmodern fashion, the title character in the visually stylish Opheliamachine at Santa Monica's City Garage is a tragic figure, though she bears only slight textual ties to Shakespeare's original archetype. [. . .] stream-of-consciousness monologues as densely associative and enigmatic as Müller's [. . .] Though Ophelia's quest for self-determination teeters on the brink of inevitable annihilation, she "fails better" (in Samuel Beckett's sense). With few traditional theater points of reference to navigate by, her uncompromising journey is not for the intellectually incurious.

Steven Leigh Morris, wrote for LA Weekly:

A vigorous deconstruction of the feminine psyche, image and gender roles, […] Romanska's script—heavy laden with dense imagery and symbolism—explores love, sex, violence, politics, class sensibilities, feminist aesthetics, the vacuities of mass culture and the timeless mystery of death. This is theater that's not easily accessible and is devilishly bleak at times, but it's not without shards of humor, and is relentlessly provocative and challenging.

Rose Desena wrote for The Los Angeles Post:

Stunning piece of performance art. […] Frederique's vision and creativity along with the brilliant writing of Magda Romanska takes us on a visionary exploration of love, politics and confused emotions. […] Both Ophelia and Hamlet are separated by Ocean, unable to connect with their physical emotions. Frederique uses TV screens with constant news footage to convey the message of the world in gloom while the large over screen shows us beauty, sex and the complexity of the world we live in. Hamlet (Joss Glennie-Smith) is glued to the TV using that acts as his medium for understanding the world around him. […]The metaphors are nonstop, making this an intense and complex work of art. […] What I can say is please don't miss this. Whether you fully comprehend it or just enjoy, is a fabulous treat for your psyche.

Sarah A. Spitz wrote for Santa Monica Daily Press:

In the case of City Garage, once again this outstanding local company engages in thought provocation. […] The City Garage takes Ophelia out of her poor, put-upon, mad girl role and places her in the context of a media-saturated, social network-driven 21st century world, in which she faces down the forces that shape her image as a woman. […] In Polish playwright Magda Romanska's Opheliamachine, we find multiple characters and voices representing Ophelia as she confronts a world of contradictory images for women, while considering her choices about a brooding Hamlet who "wants to understand the world but all he can do is stare at it."

Ben Miles from Showmag wrote:

Each Ophelia on display is a postmodern feminist prototype, meant to provoke us to consider the oppressed psychology of Hamlet's co-character. Is Ophelia a threat or a menace? Is Ophelia somehow disabled, or at least disempowered? Is Ophelia a heroine or a victim, or perhaps both? While there are no answers put forth regarding these suppositions, what we do get is a nonlinear overview of Ophelia's largely unfulfilled potential as an individual and dramatic character. What Opheliamachine lacks in plot, it makes up for it in a visual narrative that is borderline assaultive. […] Opheliamachine is not for everyone. There's full frontal female nudity on display, and the theatrical conceit is esoteric to say the least. But for Shakespeare aficionados and for curious theatergoers, Opheliamachine is a challenging and unsettling experience.

In response to the Berliner Ensemble production, Felix Mueller wrote for Berliner Morgenpost:

(translated from German) "If Heiner Müller freed the protagonist from his role in his Hamletmaschine in 1977, the playwright Magda Romanska did the same for Ophelia four decades later. The eight monologues that make up the piece are, above all, a form of self-empowerment. They show Ophelia in different roles, which mark her as an independent, quite contradictory being."

Doris Meierhenrich wrote for Berliner-Zeitung:

(translated from German) "Like Müller's Danenprinz in 1977, Ophelia now steps out of her victim role, for which there is a large cupboard on stage with a wooden Ophelia template in it, through which she enters and exits. Later, Hamlet and Mother Gertrude take the same route. Of course, these attempts to leave remain only parody in variations, because as then, the world is still full of violence, war and exploitation. Except that violence is no longer just a "man thing". And so the lanky Hamlet Maximilian Diehles haunts the scene as a gender-fluid macho, mother Gertrud (Hilke Altefrohne) as a business-cold girl dealer with a shrimp head."

And Christian Rakow wrote in Theatre Heute

(translated from German) "Opheliamachine is creeping into the private sphere as a potentially feminist answer to the post-dramatic classic Hamletmaschine, where Müller's text was still rambling at the end of the 1970s after seeing the socialist regime and the suppression of the democracy movement in Hungary in '56."

== Translations and publications ==
In 2014, Opheliamachine was translated and published in Italian journal Mimesis, with an introduction by Italian theatre scholar, Maria Pia Pagani.

In 2024, Opheliamachine was published by Bloomsbury Publishing as part of their prestigious Methuen Drama Play Collections. It was published in an edited collection that includes nine different translations of the play (English, German, French, Italian, Spanish, Japanese, Korean, Romanian, and Polish) along with introductory essays by Ilinca Todorut and Maria Pia Pagani. "These different versions of Opheliamachine provide academics, artists and teachers the opportunity to study a fascinating intersection of Shakespeare, translation, adaptation, feminism and avant-garde theatre."
