= Die Eroberung von Mexico =

1992 opera by Wolfgang Rihm

- Opera by Wolfgang Rihm
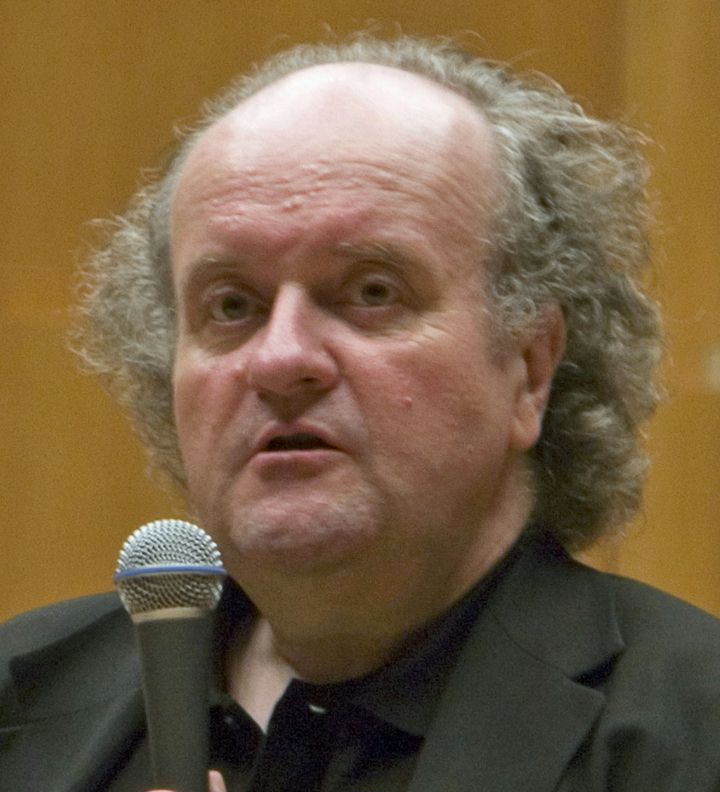
- Wolfgang Rihm, in 2007
- Translation: The Conquest of Mexico
- Librettist: Rihm
- Language: German
- Based on: Antonin Artaud's 1932 text, La conquête du Mexique
- Premiere: 9 February 1992; Hamburg State Opera

Die Eroberung von Mexico (The Conquest of Mexico) is an opera in four acts by Wolfgang Rihm, premiered at the Hamburg State Opera on 9 February 1992.

== Libretto and concept ==
The libretto, by the composer, is based on Antonin Artaud's 1932 text, La conquête du Mexique, but also included elements of Artaud's Le théâtre de Séraphin and of poetry by Octavio Paz (his 1937 poem, "The Root of Man"). The work also cites an Aztec poem believed to be from the early 16th century, originally written in Nahuatl. The opera, which Rihm himself refers to as a 'music-drama', centres on the encounter between the invader Cortez and the Aztec ruler Montezuma, which was conceived by Rihm as 'an encounter with the Self'. Montezuma (sung by a soprano) has his words echoed by two other female voices offstage, whilst those of Cortez are echoed by two speaking roles.

== Roles ==
Role	Voice type	Premiere cast, 9 February 1992
Cortez	baritone	Richard Salter
Montezuma	soprano	Renate Behle
La Malinche (Cortez's mistress)	mimed role	Miriam Goldschmidt
Screaming man		Peter Kollek
Speakers, offstage voices (high soprano and contralto), Spaniards, Aztecs, animals.

== Synopsis ==
=== Act I - Die Vorzeichen (The Omens) ===
Cortez arrives in Mexico and determines to conquer it; Montezuma presages disaster.

=== Act II - Bekenntnis (Declaration) ===
Cortez enters the empty city - he begins to doubt his own reality. Meeting Montezuma, Cortez's attempts at communication break down. He taunts Montezuma's idol worship, whilst Montezuma realizes that the Spaniards are only after gold. La Malinche (danced role), (who was in fact the interpreter between the two), fails to re-establish dialogue.

=== Act III - Die Umwälzungen (The Convulsions) ===
Montezuma is increasingly mentally disturbed. Cortez produces a screaming man who enters Montezuma's body. In torment, Montezuma delivers a long address in which his two 'alternative' voices and the female choir also join.

=== Act IV - Die Abdankung (The Abdication) ===
Montezuma has died: Cortez dreams before his statue and experiences a dissolution of his own personality. Montezuma's funeral commences and this sparks off the Aztecs and Spaniards to massacre each other (an event which did not take place in history). The male and female choruses chant the ancient Nahuatl poem. When all are dead, the voices of Cortez and Montezuma are heard in duet for the first time, singing the last verse of the poem by Paz.

== Performances ==
The opera has been performed in Cologne, Madrid and Frankfurt, and, in 2015, at the Salzburg Festival.
