= Staatstheater Mainz =

Theatre and opera house in Mainz, Germany

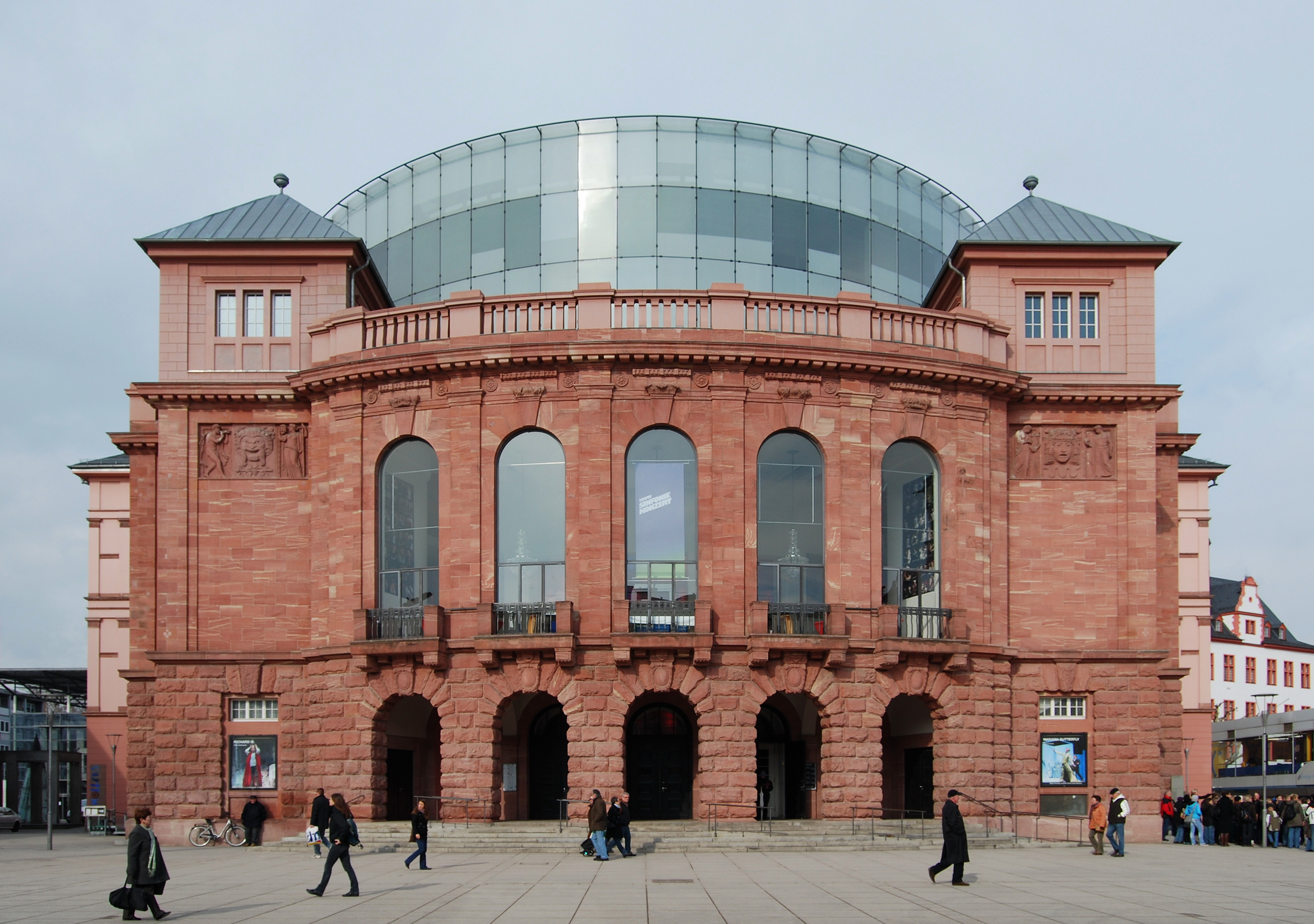
- The facade of the theatre, 2010
- Former names: Stadttheater Mainz

General information
- Type: Theatre
- Location: Mainz, Rhineland-Palatinate, Germany, Gutenbergplatz
- Coordinates: 49°59′58″N 08°16′16″E
- Opened: 1833

Design and construction
- Architect: Georg Moller

Website
- www.staatstheater-mainz.com

The Staatstheater Mainz (Mainz State Theatre) is a theatre in Mainz, Germany, which is owned and operated by the state of Rhineland-Palatinate. Situated on the Gutenbergplatz, the complex comprises two theatres which are connected by an underground passage and also by skywalk. Performances of opera, drama and ballet are presented. Its name was Stadttheater Mainz (municipal theatre) until 1989.

The main building was constructed between 1829 and 1833 by Georg Moller in Neoclassical style. The construction had been requested by the bourgeoisie of the city of Mainz for decades and cost 280,000 guilders (the city's budget amounted to 300,000 guilders at that time). The theatre's great hall (Großes Haus) was destroyed by bombing during World War II. Friedrich Meyer-Oertel became director of the theatre in 1968. The small hall (Kleines Haus) was built in 1997. Remedial work from 1976 to 1977 aimed at restoring Moller's rotunda were undertaken by Dieter Oesterlen. Between 1998 and 2001, extensive renovations were carried out to restore it to its original condition and it now seats 1,000.

The resident orchestra is the Philharmonisches Staatsorchester Mainz (Philharmonic State Orchestra Mainz).

== History ==
Before the Stadttheater Mainz was constructed, there existed the theatre "Komödienhaus". The Stadttheater's great hall ("Großes Haus")) was built in 1829–33 by Georg Moller with seating for 1,500. It was inaugurated on 21 September 1833 with Weber's "Jubelouverture" and Mozart's La clemenza di Tito". In 1863, Josef Laske repaired the ducal proscenium boxes. In 1876, the auditorium and the foyer were extended by Eduard Kreyßig. In 1898–99, renovations were carried out by Ferdinand Fellner & Hermann Helmer, which involved creation of additional storage space, alterations to the roof, fixing an iron curtain, and improvements to the heating system. When it reopened on 18 September 1899, Gounod's Faust was premiered.

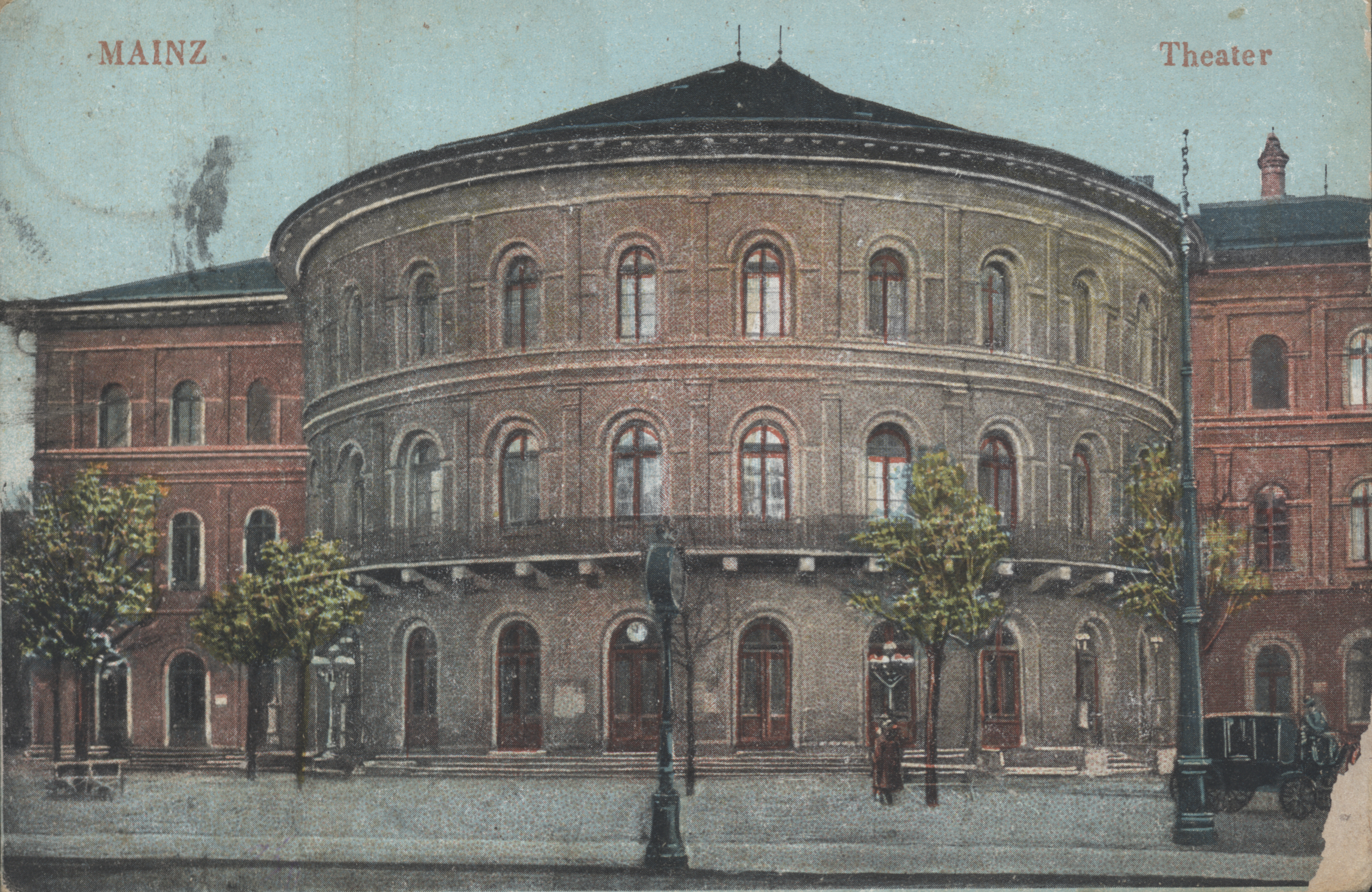
The theatre in 1910

In 1910–1912, substantial improvements were again carried out by Adolf Gelius such as increasing the foyer space, building an additional floor, modernizing the stage and changes to the auditorium. In 1938–39, the auditorium and foyer were redone after demolition of the 1912 improvements. The theatre was gutted after bombings in 1942. In 1950–51, it was rebuilt to the architectural plans of Richard Jörg with the reopening on 24 November 1951 marked by a ballet performance. In 1977, seating capacity of the auditorium for opera and drama were altered by Dieter Gesterlen to accommodate 801 seats and 887 seats respectively. However, this work was criticized for its acoustical problems, visual effect and seating comfort. In 1989, the theatre was renamed as "Staatstheater". The Kleines Haus (small hall), with a capacity of 500 seats, was built in 1997 by Klaus Möbius and inaugurated on 17 November 1997.

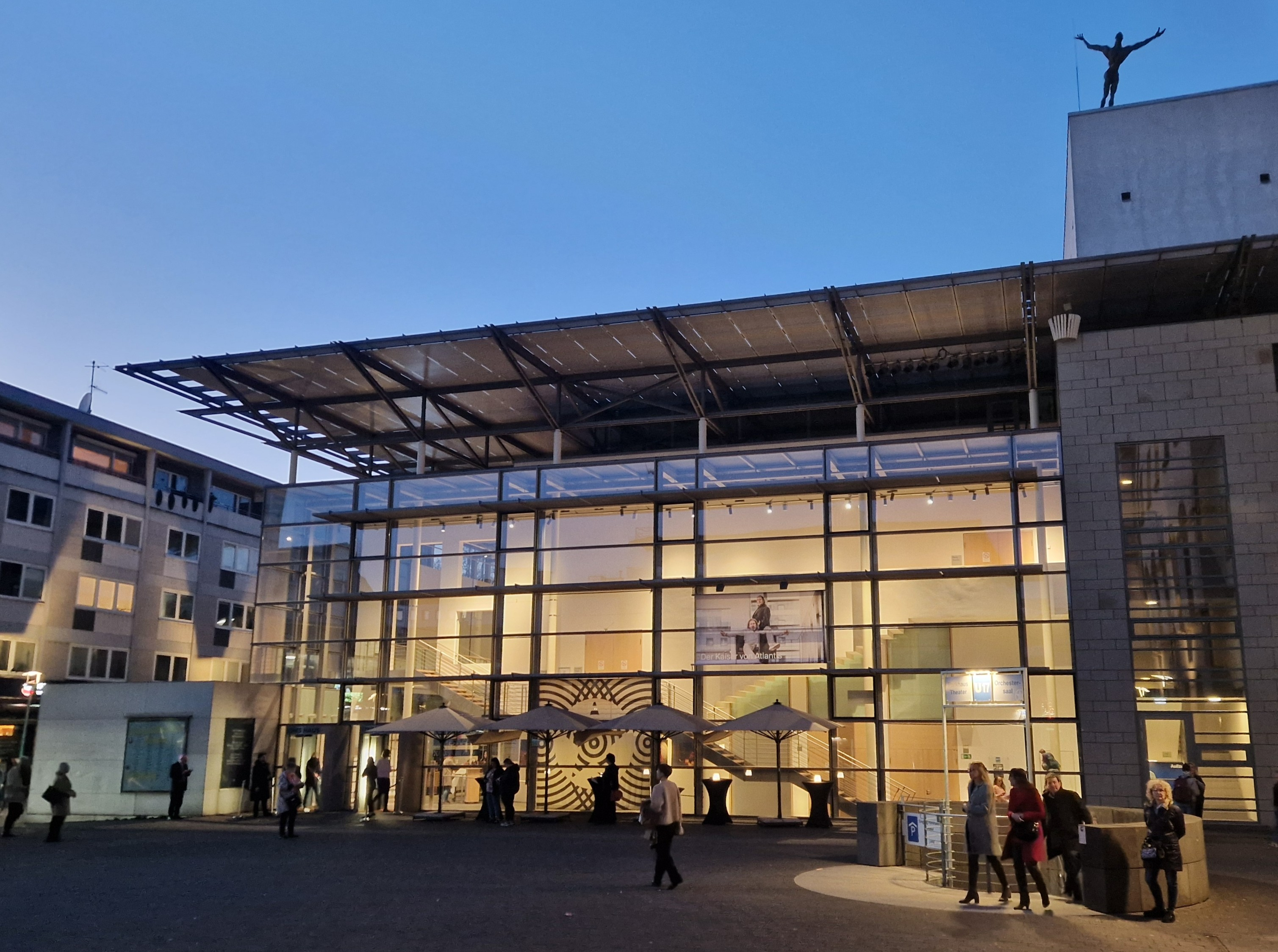
Kleines Haus

The most recent renovation and refurbishing occurred in 1998–2001. Modifications made were to the auditorium and foyers, with a new restaurant on the roof and changes to the facade. The architect was Shoyerer Möbius and builders were Kauffmann Theilig & Partner. The renovated theatre was opened to the public on 15 September 2001 with a presentation of Handel's oratorio Saul. The renovation also involved construction of a glass dome. The orchestra pit's acoustics were modified under the "Room Acoustic Approach" with transparent, absorbing screen elements such as "the Microperforated Absorber (Perspex) Broadband Compact Absorber, BCA on the absorbing side". The podium was redesigned to accommodate first and second violins. The 2001 renovation of the theatre improved its structural and technological elements with redesigned interiors. It is now a modern venue with state-of-the-art technology. The stage mechanism was renovated in 2003, when the theatre was equipped with modern technology from Bosch Rexroth who installed the complete stage machinery including the control system.

In 2026 Staatstheater Mainz was named 'Opera House of the Year' by the magazine Opernwelt based on the decision of 40 critics.

== Features ==
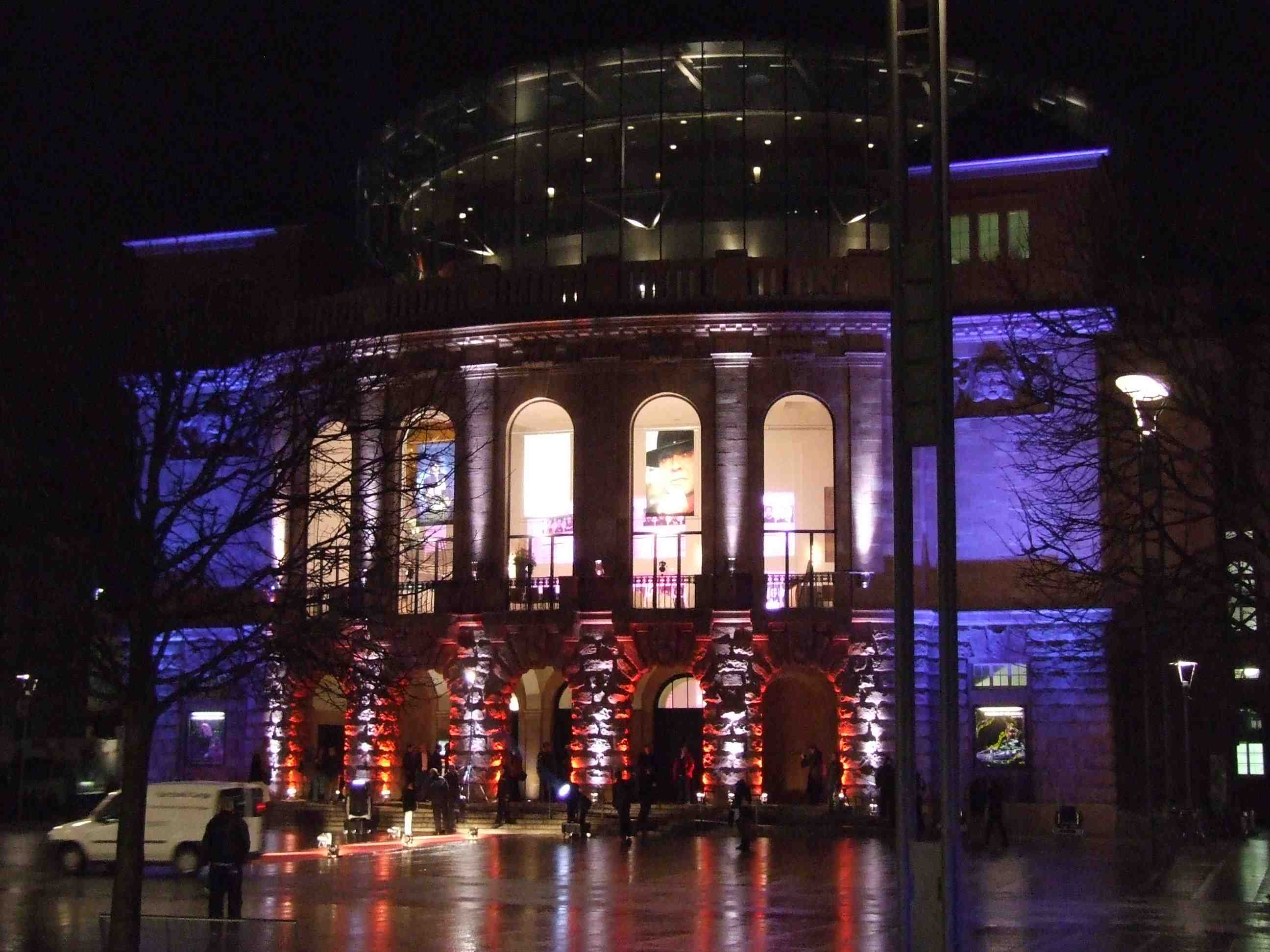
Night view of the theatre

Since 1989, the Mainz State Theatre has been reorganized as a Limited Company under the aegis of City of Mainz and the state of Rhineland-Palatinate. Annually, about 500 performances of opera, drama and ballet are held here with international audiences also participating. The Hochschule für Musik Mainz of the Johannes Gutenberg Universität and the Peter Cornelius Conservatory are collaborating with the Staatstheater to develop "Kleine Zauberflöte" as an ensemble for the young to perform at the theatre to gain experience. In 2011, a collaboration of the theatre and the university included "Mathematics and Physics in the World of Sound".

== Tanzmainz ==
The resident contemporary dance company is called tanzmainz.

== Philharmonisches Staatsorchester Mainz ==
The history of the Philharmonisches Staatsorchester Mainz, the theatre's resident orchestra, can be traced to the Mainz court orchestra in the early 16th century. It became part of the Mainz theatre in 1833. The orchestra presents a series of concerts and also programmes for children and young people.
