= Roza Sarkisian =

Ukrainian theatre director and curator

- Роза Володимирівна Саркісян
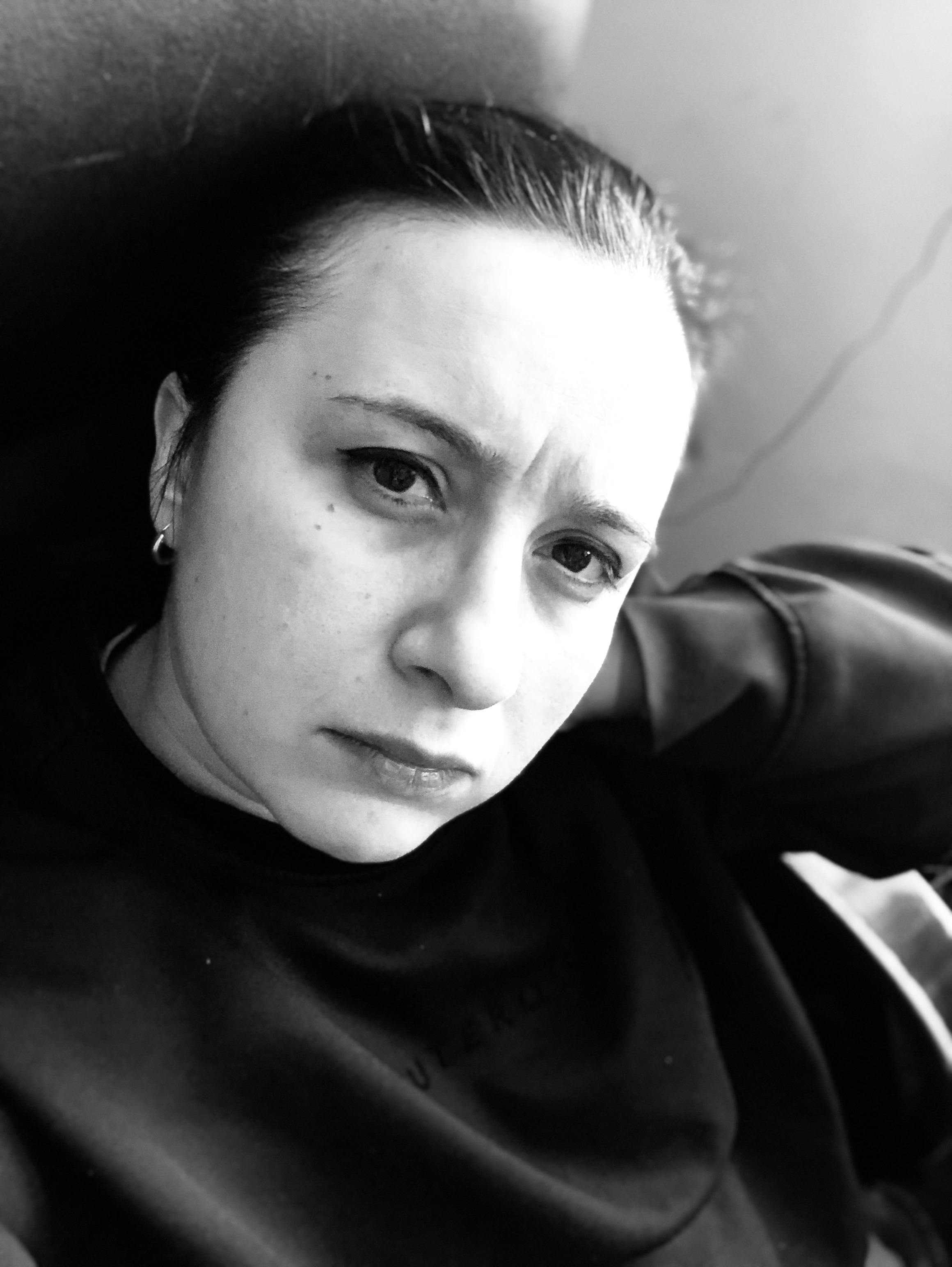
- Born: January 20, 1987 (age 39); Stepanakert, Nagorno-Karabakh AO of Azerbaijan SSR, Soviet Union
- Citizenship: Ukraine
- Education: VN Karazin Kharkiv National University, Kharkiv National Kotlyarevsky University of Arts
- Occupations: Theatre director, curator

Roza Sarkisian (Ukrainian: Роза Володимирівна Саркісян, Armenian: Ռոզա Սարգսյան; born 20 January 1987) is a Ukrainian theatre director and curator.

== Biography ==
She studied political sociology at the National University of Kharkiv and graduated in directing from the Kharkiv National University of Arts in 2012.

During her artistic period in Kharkiv, she founded and served as artistic director of the De Facto Theatre (2012–2017), an independent theatre group based at the Kharkiv Municipal Gallery that created documentary, site-specific, and devised performances in public spaces such as supermarkets, parks, and a circus.

In 2017, she co-curated the DESANT.UA, a showcase of independent Ukrainian theatre projects in Warsaw.

From 2017 to 2019, she was Chief Director of the First Ukrainian Academic Theatre for Children and Youth in Lviv. From 2019 to 2020, she worked as a director at the Ivano-Frankivsk National Academic Drama and Music Theatre.

She has collaborated with a number of theatres in Ukraine and Europe, including Maxim Gorki Theater (2023–2025), Teatr Dramatyczny in Warsaw (2023), Polish Theatre, Poznań (2021), Theatre Powszechny in Warsaw (2021), Lesia Ukrainka Academic Theatre in Lviv (2020), Kyiv Academic Theatre Actor (2018), Kharkiv Theatre for Children and Youth in Kharkiv (2015).

In 2020, she staged H-Effect, a post-documentary performance based on the personal experiences of performers, including professional actors, war veterans, and an LGBT activist, combining motifs from Shakespeare's Hamlet and Heiner Müller's Hamletmachine.. The rehearsals of H-Effect and the participants’ stories served as the basis for the documentary film The Hamlet Syndrome, directed by Elwira Niewiera and Piotr Rosołowski.

In 2021, Sarkisian, together with dramaturge Joanna Wichowska, visual artist Kiju Szałankiewicz and producer Dominika Mądry co-created Freedom Square, a performative installation with Poznań’s queer community at the Close Strangers: The East Festival at the Polish Theatre in Poznań (curator Agata Siwiak).

In 2021, she directed KOLO-BO-RACIO, an inclusive theatre project at the Ivano-Frankivsk National Academic Drama and Music Theatre involving young people and actors with disabilities.

== Selected works ==
- Yes, My Führer (De Facto Theatre, 2014)
- My Granddad Was Digging. My Father Was Digging. But I Won’t Do It (Ukrainian–Polish co-production, co-directed with Agnieszka Błońska, 2016)
- Theory of the Big Filter (Theatre of Contemporary Dialogue, Poltava, 2017)
- Psychosis 4.48 (Kyiv Academic Theatre Actor, 2018)
- Wonderful, Wonderful, Wonderful Times (First Ukrainian Academic Theatre for Children and Youth, Lviv, 2018)
- Macbeth (Lesia Ukrainka Academic Theatre, Lviv, 2019)
- H-Effect (Ukraine–Poland–Germany co-production, NGO “Art-Dialogue”, 2020)
- Radio Mariia (Theatre Powszechny in Warsaw, 2022)
- Ship. Bridge. Body (co-production with Theatre of Playwrights in Kyiv, Schaubühne Lindenfels Leipzig, and Festspielhaus Hellerau Dresden, 2023)
- Fucking Truffaut (co-production with Bliadski Circus Queer Collective, Reszka Foundation, Dramatic Theatre in Warsaw, and Maxim Gorki Theater, Berlin, 2023)
- Karabakh Memory (Maxim Gorki Theater, Berlin, 2025)

Her productions, which address themes of collective memory, national identity, political manipulation, non-normativity, and social oppression, have received awards and been presented at numerous festivals in Ukraine and Poland, including GogolFest (Kyiv, 2014, 2016), Urban Exploration Fest (Lviv, 2014), GaliciaKult (Kharkiv, 2016), Terra Futura (Kherson, 2016), Startup GogolFest (Mariupol, 2017), Golden Lion (Lviv, 2018), Parade Fest (Kharkiv, 2018, 2019), Svitohliad (Severodonetsk, 2019), Desant.UA (Warsaw, 2017), and Close Strangers Festival (Poznań, 2019).

== Awards ==
Roza is a winner of the British Council Ukraine competition "Taking the Stage 2017", as well as the Gaude Polonia scholarship of the Minister of Culture and National Heritage of the Republic of Poland in 2017, International Mobility Grant “Culture Bridges” and the Artistic Scholarship from the President of Ukraine in 2019/2020. She also won a "City of Lviv Personality of the Year 2018” award in the category of Theatre.
