= Die Hamletmaschine (opera) =

1987 opera by Wolfgang Rihm

- Opera by Wolfgang Rihm
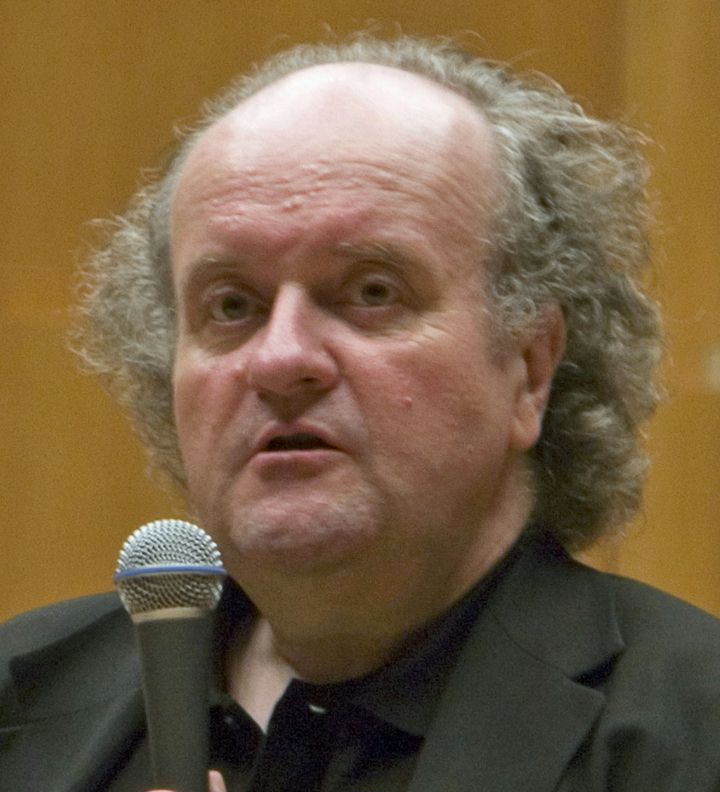
- Rihm in 2007
- Description: Musiktheater
- Librettist: Wolfgang Rihm
- Language: German
- Based on: Heiner Müller's play Die Hamletmaschine
- Premiere: 30 March 1987; Nationaltheater Mannheim

Die Hamletmaschine is an opera composed by Wolfgang Rihm to a German-language libretto based on Heiner Müller's 1977 play of the same name. The libretto, subtitled Musiktheater in 5 Teilen (Music Drama in 5 parts), was written by the composer. The opera was written between 1983 and 1986 and premiered on 30 March 1987 at the Nationaltheater Mannheim.

== Background ==
Müller's play, on which the opera is based, paraphrases Shakespeare's Hamlet. In the play's first staged production, directed by Robert Wilson, the first words—"Ich war Hamlet." (I was Hamlet.)—were spoken after 20 minutes of silent action. Rihm composed his opera between 1983 and 1986 and presented parts of the score for the Rolf-Liebermann-Preis of Hamburg, which he won in 1986.

== Performance history ==
Die Hamletmaschine premiered on 30 March 1987 at the Nationaltheater Mannheim in a production directed by Friedrich Meyer-Oertel and conducted by Peter Schneider. The role of Ophelia, written for a Wagnerian soprano, was sung by Gabriele Schnaut. The Hamlet character was portrayed at different stages in his life by three separate performers: the actors Kurt Müller and Rudolf Kowalski as Hamlet I and Hamlet II, and the baritone Johannes M. Kösters as Hamlet III.

A live recording of the opera's premiere was released on CD in 1995 (Wergo #6195)

== Roles ==
Role	Voice type	Premiere cast, 30 March 1987
Hamlet I	male actor	Kurt Müller
Hamlet II	male actor	Rudolf Kowalski
Hamlet III	male actor	Johannes M. Kösters
Ophelia	soprano	Gabriele Schnaut
Ophelia's doubles: Marx	soprano	Carmen Fuggiss
Lenin	soprano	Ulrike Sonntag
Mao	mezzo-soprano	Martina Borst
3 naked women, voices from the casket	2 sopranos, mezzo-soprano	
4 laughing people	2 female and 2 male actors	
3 screaming people	male actors	

== Structure ==
1. Familienalbum (Family Album)
2. Das Europa der Frau (Europe of the Woman)
3. Scherzo
4. Pest in Buda, Schlacht um Grönland (Pestilence in Buda, Battle of Greenland)
5. Wildharrend, In der furchtbaren Rüstung, Jahrtausende (Wildstraining, In the Fearsome Armaments, Millennia)

== Music ==
The opera is scored for actors, singing and speaking voices, choir and orchestra. The work is described in the Concise Oxford Dictionary of Opera as following Stockhausen in that it seeks "a total theatre of sound and nonnarrative, ritualistic drama." Sounds use the complete space of a hall by placing instrumentalists not only in the pit, but also on stage and in the audience. Sounds are mixed from live performance, electronic amplification and purely electronic sounds, described as soundscapes.

== Other musical settings ==
Müller's play, which formed the basis for the libretto, has subsequently had two more musical settings—an opera by Ruth Zechlin for singers and small orchestra (1991) and an oratorio for choir, soloists and orchestra by Georges Aperghis (2000).
