= Oedipus (opera) =

1987 opera by Wolfgang Rihm

- Opera by Wolfgang Rihm
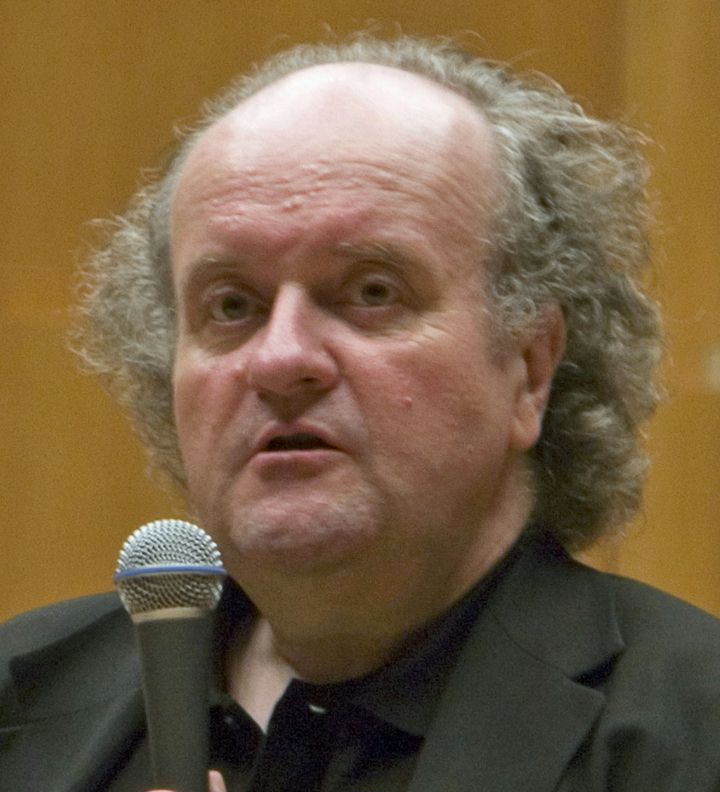
- Rihm in 2007
- Librettist: Wolfgang Rihm
- Language: German
- Based on: Oedipus Rex by Sophocles
- Premiere: 4 October 1987; Deutsche Oper Berlin

Oedipus is an opera in two parts composed by Wolfgang Rihm to a German-language libretto that he based on the Greek tragedy Oedipus Rex by Sophocles and related texts by Friedrich Nietzsche and Heiner Müller. The work is characterised as Musiktheater (Music drama). Written in 1986 and 1987, it was premiered on 4 October 1987 at the Deutsche Oper Berlin, directed by Götz Friedrich; it was broadcast live and recorded on DVD.

== History ==
Oedipus was commissioned by Deutsche Oper Berlin. Wolfgang Rihm wrote the libretto and music in 1986 and 1987. He based the libretto on the Greek tragedy Oedipus Rex by Sophocles in the translation by Friedrich Hölderlin, and also on both Friedrich Nietzsche's fragment Oedipus. Reden des letzten Philosophen mit sich selbst. Ein Fragment aus der Geschichte der Nachwelt and Heiner Müller's Ödipuskommentar.

The opera was premiered at Deutsche Oper on 4 October 1987, conducted by Christof Prick and directed by Götz Friedrich in a stage design by Andreas Reinhardt. The soloists were Andreas Schmidt (Oedipus), William Pell (Kreon), William Dooley (Tiresias), Lenus Carlson (Messenger), William Murray (Shepherd) and Emily Golden (Jokasta). The performance was broadcast live on television, and published on DVD. The opera was published by Universal Edition.

A concert version was played at the 1989 Wiener Festwochen at the Wiener Konzerthaus, conducted by Michael Gielen with Richard Salter as Oedipus and Dunja Vejzović as Jokasta.

The opera was performed in 1991 at the Santa Fe Opera in an English version by Carol Borah Palca. It was conducted by George Manahan and directed by Francesca Zambello, with Rod Gilfry as Oedipus, David Rampy as Kreon, Dooley as Tiresias, Peter Van Derick as Messenger, Patryk Wroblewski as Shephers and Golden as Jokasta.

A 2003 production was staged at the Theater Krefeld und Mönchengladbach, with Kenneth Duryea conducting the Niederrheinischen Sinfoniker and Gregor Horres directing in scenic design by Kirsten Dephoff. Johannes M. Kösters appeared in the title role, and Carola Guber as Jokasta.

== Roles ==
Role	Voice type	Premiere cast, 4 October 1987
Oedipus	baritone	Andreas Schmidt
Kreon	tenor	William Pell
Tiresias	baritone	William Dooley
Messenger	baritone	Lenus Carlson
Shepherd	baritone	William Murray
Jokasta	mezzo-soprano	Emily Golden
Sphinx	4 sopranos	
16 counselors	tenors and basses	
men, women, children	mixed choir	

== Libretto ==
Rihm fragmented the plot of the Oedipus myth and created new relations. He structured the work in 21 scenes. Six scenes deal with the drama, based on Sophocles. Three scenes reflect the background, played at the back of the stage: Oedipus and the Sphinx, a child limping though a rocky desert, and the scuffle at the crossroads. Four scenes are inner monologues of Oedipus based on Nietzsche. Five scenes are based on Müller and reflect the action from a more neutral viewpoint.

== Music ==
The music is scored for an orchestra of two flutes (one doubling piccolo), two oboes, two cor anglais, four clarinets (two doubling bass clarinets), two bassoons, two contrabassoons, four horns, four trumpets (two doubling piccolo trumpets), four trombones, six percussionists, two harps (amplified), piano, and two solo violins. Oedipus and Jokasta play on stage a large hanging metal plate and a large wooden barrel drum.

The music is dominated by brass and percussion, illustrating outcry and protest. The only strings are two solo violins that play after Oedipus blinds himself, accompanying him to the "farthest distance". The music plays mostly in extremes of range, both high and low, and in dynamic contrasts. It contains phases of silence and noise, tone clusters and violent percussion outbursts. The chorus appears on stage as a 16-part men's chorus of the counselors, while a mixed chorus, both singing and speaking, is added from tape. Rihm described the aggressive sound language: "Sound is a weapon here – or a scalpel?" ("Der Klang ist hier Waffe – oder Skalpell?")

== Recordings ==
- 4 October 1987 – Christof Prick (cond.), Götz Friedrich (dir.), Andreas Reinhardt (scenic design), chorus and orchestra of the Deutsche Oper Berlin. Andreas Schmidt (Oedipus), William Pell (Kreon), William Dooley (Tiresias), Lenus Carlson (Messenger), William Murray (Shepherd), Emily Golden (Jokasta). DVD live from the premiere, Arthaus Musik.
- 30 May 1989 – Michael Gielen (cond.), choir and ORF Radio-Symphonieorchester Wien. Richard Salter (Oedipus), William Pell (Kreon), William Dooley (Tiresias), Rudolf Katzböck (Messenger), Claudio Otelli (Shepherd), Dunja Vejzović (Jokasta), broadcast.
