= Terry Wey =

Swiss countertenor (born 1985)

Terry Wey (born 15 September 1985) is a classical countertenor, specialising in historically informed performance. As a boy soprano, he was a soloist of the Wiener Sängerknaben.

Born in Bern in a Swiss-American family of musicians, Wey began his vocal training as a member of the Wiener Sängerknaben and also studied the piano. From 2003, he appeared internationally in concert- and opera. His love of Renaissance music made him join the vocal ensemble Cinquecento.

== Selected recordings ==
- Tommaso Albinoni: Il Nascimento dell’Aurora (2007)
- Stefano Landi: Il Sant’Alessio (2008)
- Johann Sebastian Bach: Mass in B minor (2008)
- George Frederic Handel: Israel in Egypt (2008)
- Claudio Monteverdi: Il Ritorno d'Ulisse in Patria (2010)
- Bach: Es ist ein trotzig und verzagt Ding, BWV 176 (2014)
