= Jagden und Formen =

- by Wolfgang Rihm
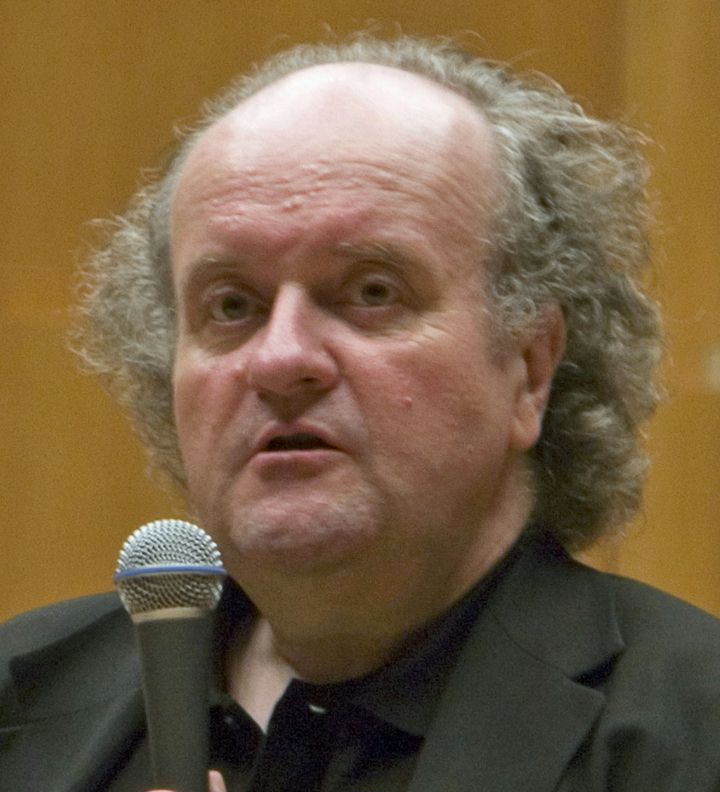
- Rihm in 2007
- English: Hunts and Forms
- Year: 1995–2001
- Period: Contemporary
- Composed: 1995–2001, Germany
- Dedication: Ensemble Modern
- Published: Vienna, 2001
- Publisher: Universal Edition
- Duration: 55–60 minutes
- Movements: 1
- Scoring: Large ensemble (chamber orchestra)

Jagden und Formen (Hunts and Forms) is an orchestral composition by German composer Wolfgang Rihm. Long considered "a work in progress", it was initially planned in the 90s and completed in 2001, although a revision with extensive changes was published in 2008.

== Background ==
=== Original version ===
This composition was already to be considered a "work in progress" from the beginning, which was a working method Rihm was really acquainted with and well-known for. A commission by the Europäischen Musikmonat, a music festival in Basel, the composition started out in 1995 and had no clear structure from the start. It took most of Rihm efforts during the 90s and the first version was provisionally finished in 2001 and premiered in November, 2001, in Basel, by the Ensemble Modern with Dominique My as conductor. The composition incorporated other Rihm compositions in it, most prominently Gejagte Form (Hunted Form), completed in 1995. These compositions were transformed, modified, and cast into one work that encapsulated the spirit of the original piece. The composition process of the piece involved continuously adding layers and reworking it for years, a process Thomas Schulz called "Übermalungstechnik" (overpainting technique). A facsimile version of the work was published in 2001 by Universal Edition. The original version of Jagden und Formen was awarded the Royal Philharmonic Society's Prize for Large-Scale Composition in 2001.

=== 2008 version ===
A second version of the piece was completed in 2008, which included a few major departures from the original material. This version was slightly longer and included additions from other Rihm works. This version was effectively called a revision of the original version, which Rihm entitled "Zustand 2008" (State 2008), and which he described as "eine mäandernde Werklandschaft" (a meandering landscape of [his] works). This version was premiered with live on-stage dancers in a choreography by Sasha Waltz at the Schauspiel Frankfurt, again with the Ensemble Modern. This version was published in a typeset edition by Universal Edition in 2008.

== Structure ==
The composition is cast into one long movement (the original version has a total duration of 55 minutes and the 2008 version lasts for one hour). It is scored for orchestra, consisting of two flutes, an English horn, two clarinets in A, two bass clarinets in B♭, a contrabass clarinet in B♭, a bassoon, a contrabassoon, two French horn in F, two trumpets in C, two trombones, a bass tuba, a guitar, an electric bass guitar, a harp, a piano, a very discreet string section, consisting of two violins, a viola, a cello, and a five-stringed double bass, and a relatively large percussion section consisting of three percussion players, playing three antique cymbals, a vibraphone, two sets of tubular bells, eleven nipple gong, eight variously-pitched woodblocks, four differently-sized suspended cymbals, three differently-sized tam-tams, a snare drum, two bass drums, a marimba, two pairs of clash cymbals, six differently-pitched bongo drums, three differently-pitched tom-toms, and a conga.

Rihm refused to describe Jagden und Formen as a Concerto for Orchestra, even though, just like in many other concertos for orchestra, certain instruments have lengthy solo passages. The piece starts out with a clap of hands by all the musicians on stage and a violin duo, which is later joined by the woodwinds, brass, and percussion and, later on, by the rest of the instrument in the orchestra, using the same structure and thematic material as in Gejagte Form. A series of climaxes and calm moments are intersparsed throughout the work. The composer uses dotted rhythms and surging quavers, creating a breathless and relentless musical quality. It has been described as modernist, evoking the style of Franco Donatoni.

== Recordings ==
Recordings of Jagden und Formen
Version	Orchestra	Conductor	Date of recording	Place of recording	Label	First release	Format
Original version	Ensemble Modern	Dominique My	August 2001	Hessischer Rundfunk, Frankfurt	Deutsche Grammophon	2002	CD
2008 version	Ensemble Modern	George Benjamin	September 2020	Philharmonie, Berlin	Ensemble Modern Medien	2022	CD
2008 version	Bavarian Radio Symphony Orchestra	Franck Ollu	June 2021	Residenz, Munich	BR-Klassik	2022	CD

== Reception ==
A reviewer in Gramophone wrote that Jagden und Formen was one of the strongest Rihm scores they had heard "and holds the listener throughout its [50-odd] minutes [...] Those unfamiliar with his music (or with his recent output‚ certainly) could do worse than start here." Tom Service described it in The Guardian as the best introduction to Rihm's work, praising its "uncanny sense of drama and pacing".
