= Jakob Lenz (opera) =

1979 opera by Wolfgang Rihm

- Chamber opera by Wolfgang Rihm
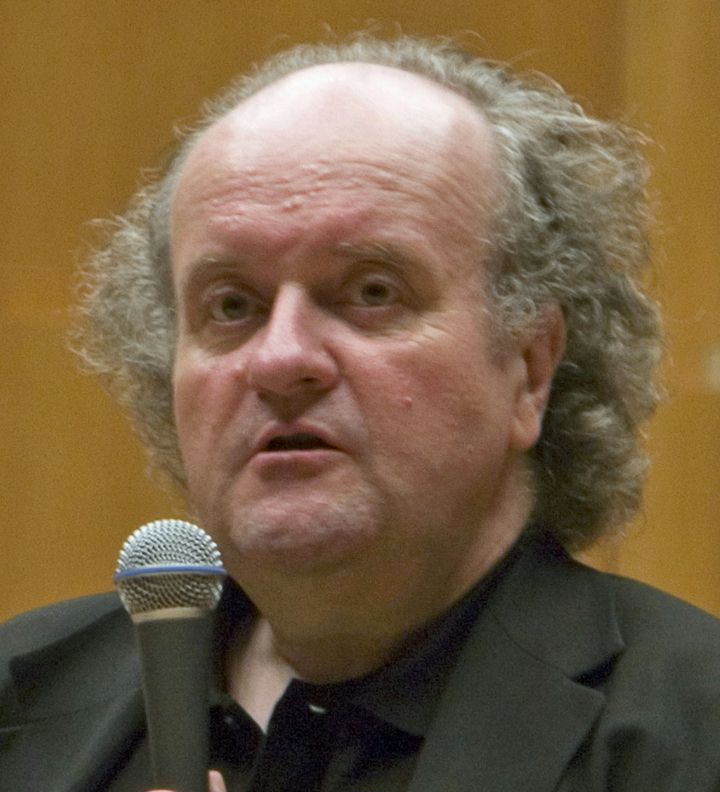
- The composer in 2007
- Librettist: Michael Fröhling
- Language: German
- Based on: Lenz (1836) by Georg Büchner
- Premiere: 8 March 1979; Hamburg State Opera

Jakob Lenz is a one-act chamber opera by Wolfgang Rihm, written 1977–78 to a libretto by Michael Fröhling after Georg Büchner's 1836 novella Lenz which in turn is based on an incident in the life of the German poet Jakob Michael Reinhold Lenz (1751–1792). Rihm dedicated the opera to his teacher, Eugen Werner Velte.

Rihm received for Jakob Lenz the Beethoven Prize of the city of Bonn in 1980.

== Performance history ==
The first performance was given at the Hamburg State Opera on 8 March 1979. It was first performed in the United States in 1981 at Indiana University and in New York at the Juilliard Theater in 1987. The UK premiere was in 1987 at the Almeida Festival. There was an English National Opera/Hampstead Theatre co-production at the Hampstead Theatre in London in April 2012, given in celebration of the 60th birthday of the composer. It was directed by Sam Brown, and conducted by Alexander Ingram, with Andrew Shore in the leading role.

== Roles and orchestra ==
Rolws, voice types, premiere cast
Role	Voice type	Premiere cast, 8 March 1979 Conductor: Klauspeter Seibel
Lenz	baritone	Richard Salter
Pastor Oberlin	bass	Ude Krekow
Kaufmann	tenor	Peter Haage
Chorus of six solo voices (2 sopranos, 2 altos, 2 basses), 2 or 4 children sopranos (Note: The chorus embodies real people, or Nature.)

The opera is scored for 2 oboes (2nd doubling cor anglais), clarinet (doubling bass clarinet), bassoon (doubling contrabassoon), trumpet, trombone, 3 cellos, harpsichord, percussion.
