= Wolfgang Rihm =

German composer and teacher (1952–2024)

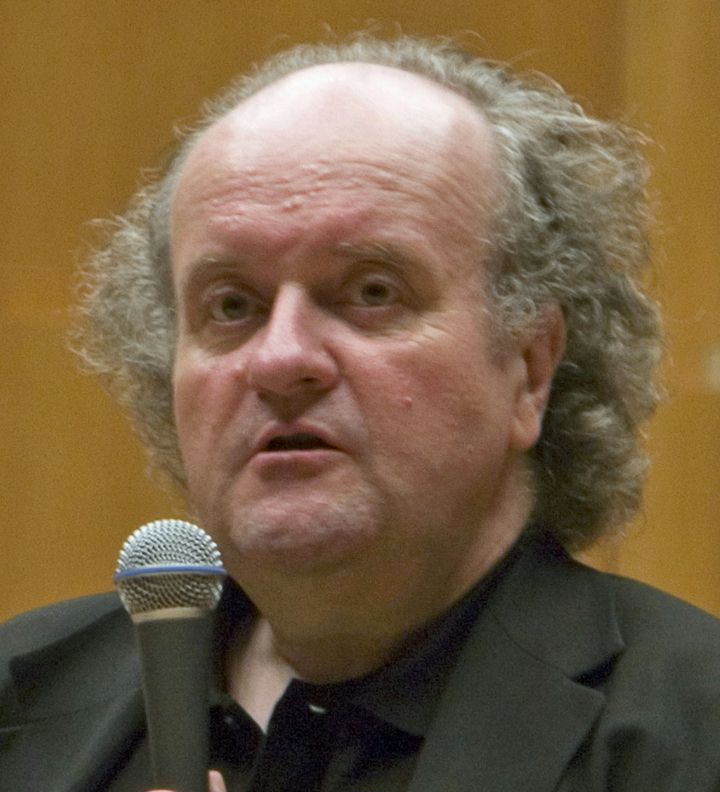
- Rihm at the Kölner Philharmonie in 2007
- Born: 13 March 1952; Karlsruhe, Württemberg-Baden, West Germany
- Died: 27 July 2024 (aged 72); Ettlingen, Baden-Württemberg, Germany
- Education: Hochschule für Musik Karlsruhe
- Occupations: Composer; academic teacher
- Organizations: Hochschule für Musik Karlsruhe; Lucerne Festival Academy
- Known for: Jakob Lenz; Die Hamletmaschine; Dionysos
- Works: List of compositions
- Awards: Bach Prize of Hamburg; Ordre des Arts et des Lettres; Ernst von Siemens Music Prize

Wolfgang Michael Rihm (German: [ˈvɔlfɡaŋ ˈʁiːm]; 13 March 1952 – 27 July 2024) was a German composer of contemporary classical music and an academic teacher based in Karlsruhe. He was an influential post-war European composer, as "one of the most original and independent musical voices" there, composing over 500 works including several operas.

The premiere of Rihm's Morphonie for orchestra at the 1974 Donaueschingen Festival won him international recognition. Rihm pursued a freedom of expression, combining avant-garde techniques with emotional individuality. His chamber opera Jakob Lenz was premiered in 1977, exploring the inner conflict of a poet's soul. The premiere of his opera Oedipus at Deutsche Oper Berlin in 1987 was broadcast live and recorded as DVD. When his opera Dionysos was first performed at the Salzburg Festival in 2010, it was voted World Premiere of the Year by Opernwelt. He was commissioned to compose a work for the opening of the Elbphilharmonie, and created the song cycle Reminiszenz which was premiered in 2017.

Rihm was professor of composition at the Hochschule für Musik Karlsruhe from 1985, with students including Rebecca Saunders and Jörg Widmann. He was composer in residence for the BBC, at the Lucerne Festival and the Salzburg Festival. He was honoured as an officer of the Ordre des Arts et des Lettres in 2001 and received the Ernst von Siemens Music Prize in 2003.

== Biography ==
=== Youth, early work and studies ===
Rihm was born in Karlsruhe on 13 March 1952. His parents were Julius Rihm, a treasurer for the Red Cross, and Margarete, a homemaker. He grew up with a sister, Monika. The boy began to compose at age eleven, and wrote a plan for a mass the following year. He was an enthusiastic choir singer, and he often improvised on the organ, creating "sound orgies" in the style of French organists. His cello sonata earned him a prize at the Jugend musiziert competition at age 16. He wrote his second string quartet at age 18.

At the Hochschule für Musik Karlsruhe, he studied music theory and composition with Eugen Werner Velte while still attending secondary school. He took his undergraduate final exams in 1972, when he graduated from secondary school. He attended the Darmstädter Ferienkurse from 1970 and studied with Karlheinz Stockhausen in Cologne from 1972 to 1973. Rihm then enrolled at the Hochschule für Musik Freiburg from 1973 to 1976, studying composition with Klaus Huber and musicology with Hans Heinrich Eggebrecht. His other teachers included Wolfgang Fortner and Humphrey Searle.

=== Initial successes and teaching ===
The premiere of Rihm's Morphonie at the 1974 Donaueschingen Festival launched his career in the European new music scene. It was regarded as "indecently individual" ("unanständig individuell"). Rihm pursued expressive freedom in clear opposition to established norms. He combined the techniques of then-contemporary classical music with the emotional volatility of Gustav Mahler and the musical expressionism of Arnold Schönberg. Rihm later cited Claude Debussy, saying that Debussy and the expressionist Schönberg combined "minimal formalism and system with the maximal expression". Many regarded this as a revolt against the early Darmstadt School generation of Stockhausen and Pierre Boulez.

His Dis-Kontur (1974) has been described as "rusty and brutal", "channeling primal acoustic violence". When Sub-Kontur (1975) was premiered in Donaueschingen (1976), the audience complained about Rihm's "brutal noise". Some critics called it a "fecal piece". But positive reviews of his early work led to many commissions in the following years. His chamber opera Jakob Lenz premiered in 1977; it explores the inner conflict of a poet's soul without following a linear narrative.

In 1978 he became a lecturer at the Darmstädter Ferienkurse. From 1985 onward, he was a composition professor at the Hochschule für Musik Karlsruhe, succeeding his teacher Velte. Rihm followed Velte's approach of educating in open dialogue with the individual student, cultivating freedom of thought.

His opera Die Hamletmaschine, composed between 1983 and 1986 based on Heiner Müller's play, Hamletmachine, premiered at the Nationaltheater Mannheim in 1987. It was described as a "total theatre of sound" and a "non-narrative, ritualistic drama" reminiscent of Stockhausen. He based the libretto for his opera Oedipus, commissioned by Deutsche Oper Berlin on the Greek tragedy by Sophocles and related texts by Friedrich Nietzsche and Heiner Müller. The premiere in October 1987, directed by Götz Friedrich, was broadcast live and recorded as DVD. Rihm's work continued in an expressionist vein. However, the influence of Luigi Nono, Helmut Lachenmann, and Morton Feldman, amongst others, affected his style significantly.

=== International successes and honours ===
At Walter Fink's invitation, Rihm was the fifth composer featured in the annual Komponistenporträt of the Rheingau Musik Festival in 1995. The same year, he contributed Communio (Lux aeterna) to the Requiem of Reconciliation. The Free University of Berlin awarded him an honorary doctorate in 1998.

In 2003 Rihm received the Ernst von Siemens Music Prize, as

... one of the most prolific and versatile composers of our time. With inexhaustible imagination, a vital creative drive and keen self-reflection, he has created an oeuvre rich in facets, which already comprises over four hundred compositions from all musical genres. Rihm's music manifests his belief in the indestructible existence of the creative individual, who is able to assert his strength and dignity against all external threats. (Note: German: "... einen der fruchtbarsten und vielseitigsten Komponisten der Gegenwart. Mit unerschöpflicher Phantasie, vitaler Schaffenslust und scharfer Selbstreflexion hat er ein an Facetten reiches Œuvre geschaffen, das schon heute über vierhundert Kompositionen aus allen musikalischen Gattungen umfasst. In Rihms Musik manifestiert sich der Glaube an die unzerstörbare Existenz des schöpferischen Individuums, das seine Kraft und Würde gegen alle äußeren Gefährdungen zu behaupten vermag.")

The New York Philharmonic commissioned and premiered his Two Other Movements in 2004. Matthias Rexroth sang his Kolonos | 2 Fragments by Hölderlin after Sophokles for countertenor and small orchestra in 2008 at the Bad Wildbad Kurhaus, with Antonino Fogliani conducting the Virtuosi Brunensis.

In 2009 Rihm's opera Proserpina premiered successfully at the Schwetzingen Festival.

In March 2010, the BBC Symphony Orchestra featured Rihm's music in one of their 'total immersion' weekends at the Barbican Centre in London. Using recordings from that weekend, BBC Radio 3 dedicated three Hear and Now programmed to his work.

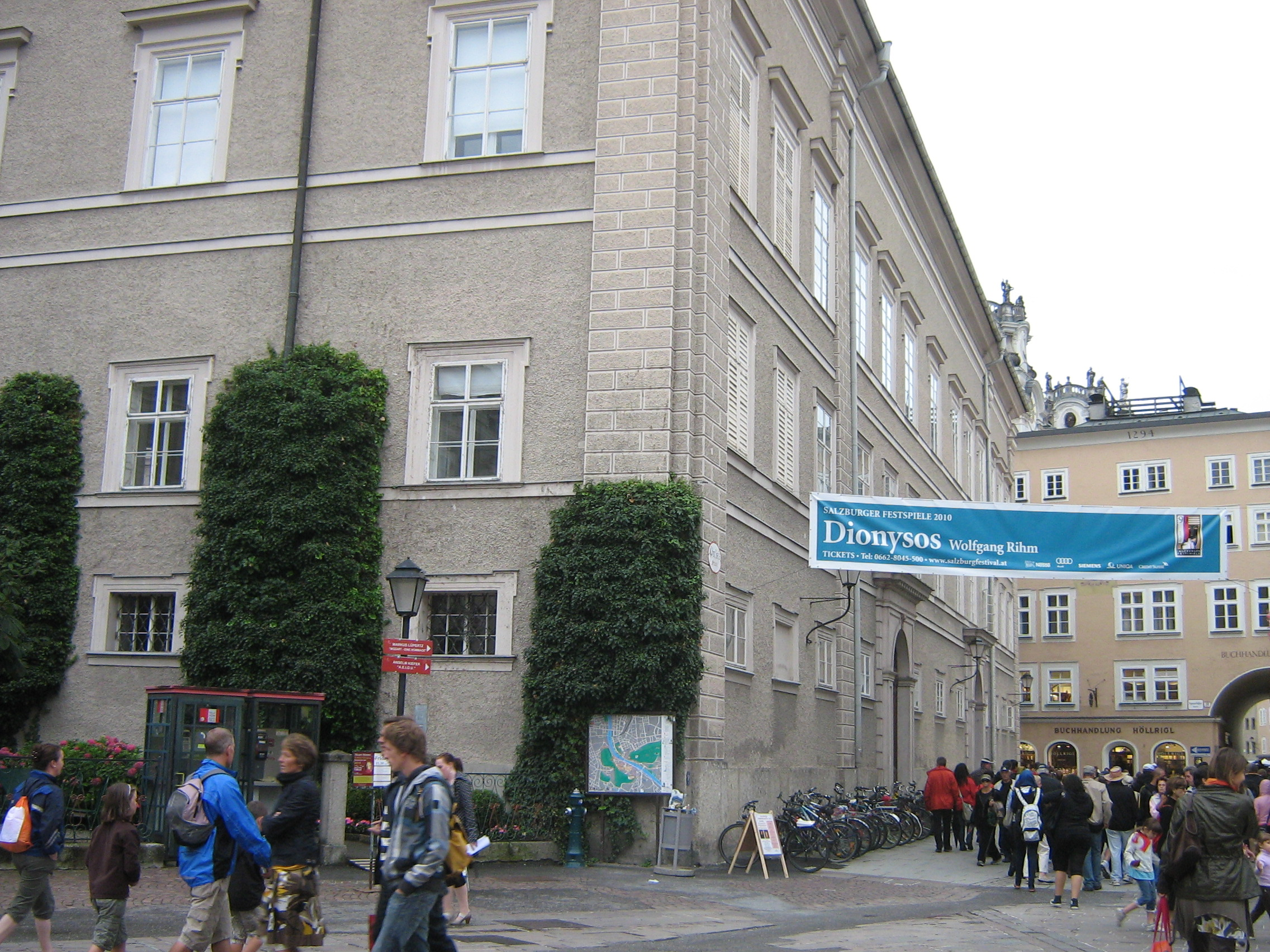
Entrance to the premiere of Dionysos at the Salzburg Festival 2010

On 27 July 2010, his opera Dionysos (on Nietzsche's late cycle of poems Dionysian-Dithyrambs) was premiered at the Salzburg Festival by Ingo Metzmacher with sets designed by Jonathan Meese. In Opernwelt magazine, this performance was voted by critics World Premiere of the Year.

The Trio Accanto premiered his Gegenstück (2006, rev. 2010) for bass saxophone, percussion, and piano on 16 August 2010, celebrating the 80th birthday of Walter Fink. Anne-Sophie Mutter and the New York Philharmonic premiered his violin concerto Lichtes Spiel (Light Games) in Avery Fisher Hall on 18 November 2010.

In 2016 Rihm became artistic director of the Lucerne Festival Academy where young musicians, directors and composers are trained in music of the 20th and 21st centuries. On 11 January 2017, the Elbphilharmonie in Hamburg was inaugurated with the premiere of Reminiszenz, a song cycle for tenor and large orchestra that he composed on a commission for the occasion. Rihm wrote and dedicated Concerto en Sol to cellist Sol Gabetta in 2020. It was reviewed as a radiant musical portrait. Among his last works were a Stabat Mater and the song cycle Terzinen an den Tod.

=== Personal life ===
Rihm lived in Karlsruhe and Berlin. He was married to Johanna Feldhausen-Rihm; they had a son, Sebastian. The marriage ended in divorce. He married Uta Frank in 1992; they had a daughter, Katja. They separated, and Uta Frank died in 2013. He married Verena Weber in 2017.

His friend, the philosopher Peter Sloterdijk, said in an interview: "In a certain way he was an anti-ascetic character", taking pleasure in living. About cooking for friends, Sloterdijk said: "There was always a certain level of form and a certain inventive height. He never just cooked a simple recipe. He was always improvising and inventing."

Rihm was diagnosed with cancer in 2017. He said in an interview in 2020: "Of course, like every person, I'm physically approaching the end. But I'm not at the end of my creative energy."

Rihm died in a hospice in Ettlingen on 27 July 2024, at the age of 72, after battling cancer for many years.

== Compositions and style ==
Rihm composed more than 500 works and was particularly known for his operas. 460 of his works were published, and manuscripts are held by the Paul Sacher Foundation. Despite this productivity, he said he never found composing easy; rather, he was dedicated to his work. Tom Service described Rihm's music as comprising a "bewildering variety of styles and sounds" in The Guardian. Jeffrey Arlo Brown described it as a "forceful, shape-shifting" œuvre in The New York Times.

In the late 1970s and early 1980s, his name was associated with the movement called New Simplicity (Neue Einfachheit), a term popularized by Aribert Reimann. Writing in 1977, Rihm suggested instead New Multiplicity (Neue Vielfalt) or New Clarity (Neue Eindeutigkeit), since he felt his music was not well described as simple. His music was sometimes also described as Neoromantic.

In the 1980s, Rihm's music was newly described as representing "New Subjectivity" or Neo-expressionism, with its "free figuration, emotional pathos, ... and ... clear individualization", sometimes in relation to contemporaneous art schools like Junge Wilde (also known as Neue Wilde) in Germany or the Transavantgarde (also known as Arte Cifra or Transavantguardia) in Italy. However, Rihm did not seek to belong to any school and said that such things "must not be looked for" in his music. Nonetheless, Yves Knockaert considered that there were important philosophical and stylistic affinities, especially between Rihm's music and the work of Georg Baselitz.

Rihm once said he sought "a new kind of coherence, no longer only restricted to process". He experimented with "loosening coherence" in his "Notebook Compositions": the Musik for drei Streicher (1977), Zwischenblick: "Selbsthenker!" for string quartet (1983–1984), and the String Quartets Nos. 5 and 6. In these, he wrote the music with little, if any, precomposition or revision. Yves Knockaert compared his manner of writing here to the expressionist, but not the dodecaphonic, Schönberg.

Rihm wrote his own libretti, based on the writings of Sophocles, Hölderlin, Nietzsche, Artaud and Müller. Rihm grouped particular themes in cycles, like Chiffre, Vers une symphonie-fleuve, Séraphin, and Über die Linie. He also experimented with writing musical fragments, like Alexanderlieder, Lenz-Fragmente, and Fetzen (Scraps).

=== Reception ===
According to Bachtrack, Rihm was in 2022 in the Top 10 of the most performed living contemporary composers in the world. He was acclaimed for his independence and continuous self-invention, which Brown said "reinvigorated" contemporary classical music.

== Legacy ==
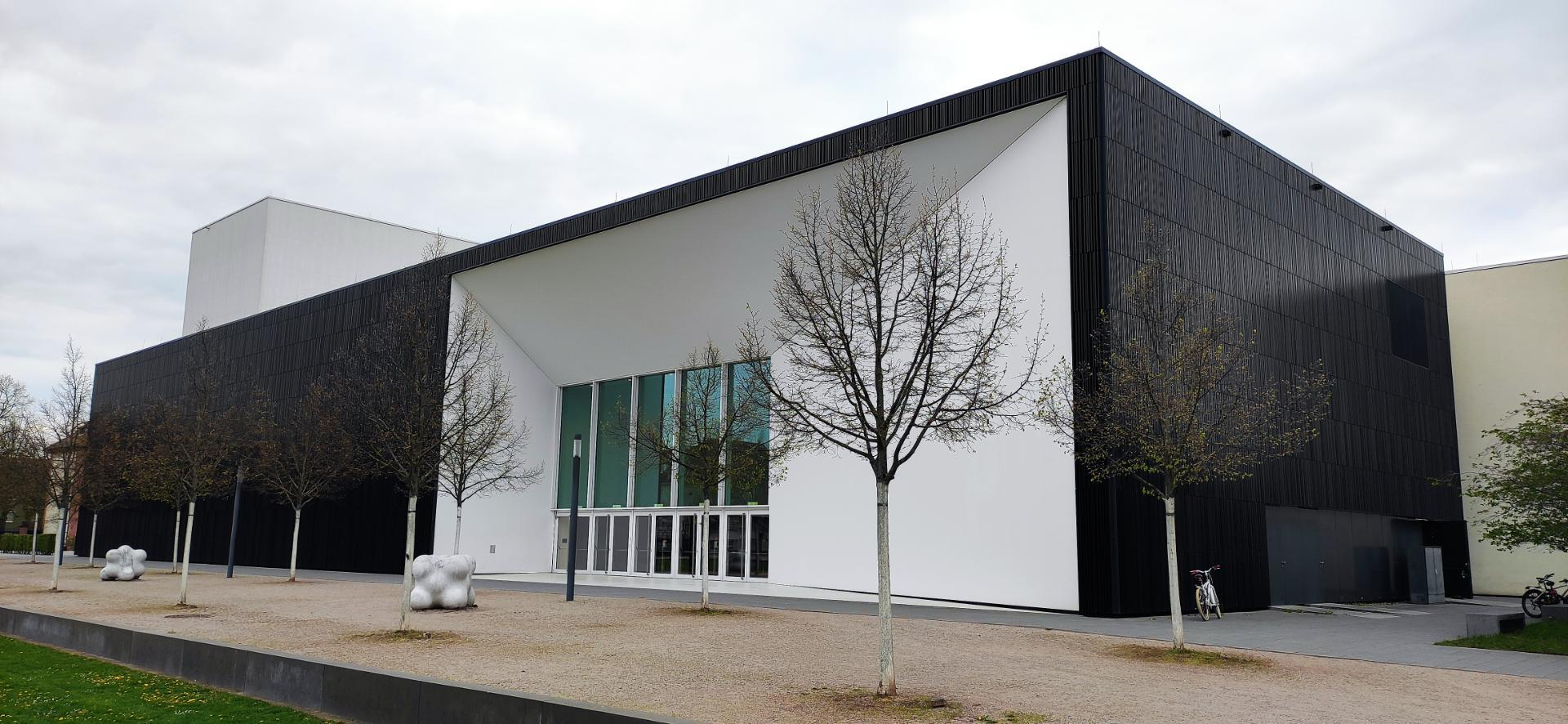
Wolfgang-Rihm-Forum

In 2013, the Wolfgang-Rihm-Forum was opened at the Hochschule für Musik Karlsruhe, a multi-functional auditorium with 400 seats.

== Awards ==
- 1978 Kranichstein Music Prize
- 1978 Reinhold Schneider Prize of the City of Freiburg
- 1981 Beethoven Prize of the City of Bonn
- 1986 Rolf Liebermann Prize for his opera The Hamlet Machine
- 1997 Musical Composition Prize from The Prince Pierre Foundation
- 1998 Jacob Burckhardt Prize from the Johann Wolfgang von Goethe Foundation
- 2000 Bach Prize of the Free and Hanseatic City of Hamburg
- 2001 Royal Philharmonic Society Award for the work Hunts and Forms (Jagden und Formen)
- 2001 Officer of Ordre des Arts et des Lettres by the French Ministry of Foreign Affairs
- 2003 Ernst von Siemens Music Prize
- 2004 Medal of Merit from the State of Baden-Württemberg
- 2012 Pour le Mérite
- 2014 Grand Cross of Merit with Star of the Federal Republic of Germany
- 2014 Bavarian Maximilian Order for Science and Art
- 2014 Robert Schumann Prize for Poetry and Music
- 2017 European Church Music Prize
- 2018 Foundation Prize of the Ecumenical Foundation for the Bible and Culture
- 2019 German Music Authors' Prize (Lifetime achievement)

=== Honorary doctorates ===
- 1998 Free University of Berlin

=== Memberships ===
- 1983 Bayerische Akademie der Schönen Künste
- 1986 Academy of Arts, Berlin
- 1996 Deutsche Akademie für Sprache und Dichtung, Darmstadt
- 2000 Freie Akademie der Künste Hamburg
- European Academy of Sciences and Arts

== Students ==
Rihm's students included Rebecca Saunders, David Philip Hefti, Márton Illés, and Jörg Widmann. Saunders said about his teaching that "he fought steadily and consequently against polemic thinking, and he encouraged a decidedly personal aesthetic unique to each of his many students." Widmann characterized Rihm as "sometimes manic-obsessive and always extreme".

== Writings ==
- Rihm, Wolfgang (1997). Mosch, Ulrich (ed.). Ausgesprochen: Schriften und Gespräche (in German). Winterthur: Amadeus Verlag. ISBN 978-3-7957-0395-0.
- Rihm, Wolfgang; Brinkmann, Reinhold (2001). Musik Nachdenken: Reinhold Brinkmann und Wolfgang Rihm im Gespräch (in German). Regensburg: ConBrio Verlag. ISBN 978-3-932581-47-2.
- Rihm, Wolfgang (2002). Mosch, Ulrich (ed.). Offene Enden: Denkbewegungen um und durch Musik (in German). Munich: Hanser Verlag. ISBN 978-3-446-20142-2.
