= Literaturoper =

Opera genre using an existing literary work

Literaturoper (German: [lɪtəʁaˈtuːɐ̯ˌʔoːpɐ]; "literature opera"; plural Literaturopern), a term coined by the German music critic Edgar Istel, describes a genre of opera that emerged during the late 19th century. When an existing play for the legitimate theatre is set to music without major changes and without the intervention of a librettist, a Literaturoper is the result. Although the term is German, it can be applied to any kind of opera, irrespective of style or language. (In that sense it can be regarded as a term rather than a genre as such.)

The former, much broader usage of the term Literaturoper for opera libretti on the basis of dramas, novels and short stories of undoubted literary renown, which was still common until around 1980, has been made obsolete by recent research on the history of the opera libretto. Since opera libretti have relied on subject matter from the history of literature since the very origin of the genre of opera, a broader usage of the term would cover the entire history of opera, regardless of the underlying libretto structure.

== Current definition ==
According to a seminal publication by Peter Petersen, the term means "a special form of music theater in which the libretto is based on a literary work whose linguistic, semantic and aesthetic structure remains recognizable in the musical-dramatic work as a structural layer."

== History ==
The tradition of literaturoper only became established in European opera culture when, with Richard Wagner and the "through-composed dramatic form" he developed, the conventions of verse metrics for the opera libretto had faded. At the same time, the personal union of libretto poet and composer appeared as the new norm of opera production. Especially in the area of the Romance languages, the alliterating verse in Wagner's Ring des Nibelungen was perceived as prose text, since the use of alliteration as basis for the poetry in the Ancient Germanic languages had always been alien the syllable-counting verse systems in the French, Italian, Spanish and Portuguese poetic tradition.

Since the production of literaturopern possessed the potential to make the function of the opera librettist redundant, the genre was first able to assert itself in those opera cultures in which professional libretto-writing had not been able to develop a centuries-long tradition (Russia, Germany). The first examples of this dramaturgical process can be found in the history of French and Russian music in the second half of the 19th century. Early Russian literaturopern include Alexander Dargomyzhsky’s opera The Stone Guest (after Alexander Pushkin) and Modest Mussorgsky’s opera fragment The Marriage and his Boris Godunov (also after Pushkin).

In French and Italian opera, which had possessed an established libretto tradition for centuries, the introduction of the literaturoper took place parallel to the discussions about the possibility of writing opera libretti in prose. Since the Italian tradition of operatic verse proved to be particularly resistant to the introduction of prose libretti, the first Italian literaturopern were created on the basis of Gabriele d'Annunzio’s verse dramas (Alberto Franchetti, La figlia di Iorio (1906), Pietro Mascagni, Parisina (1913), Riccardo Zandonai, Francesca da Rimini (1914), Ildebrando Pizzetti, Fedra (1915).

The first composers to directly set plays include Charles Gounod, Pietro Mascagni, Claude Debussy, Richard Strauss and Alban Berg. After the Second World War, the genre flourished, especially in Germany, and composers often resorted to setting plays from previous centuries or from Greek Antiquity. The production of literary operas continues to this day.

== Literaturopern based on plays ==
- Nikolai Rimsky-Korsakov (all based on plays by Lev Mei)
  - The Maid of Pskov (Псковитянка, 1873)
  - The Noblewoman Vera Sheloga (Боярыня Вера Шелога, 1898)
  - The Tsar's Bride (Царская невеста, 1899)
  - Servilia (ервилия, 1902)
- Modest Musorgsky
  - The Marriage after Alexander Pushkin's play, 1868 (unfinished)
  - Boris Godunov after Alexander Pushkin's play, 1874
- Alexander Dargomyzhsky
  - The Stone Guest (Каменный гость) after Alexander Pushkin's play of the same name, 1872
- Charles Gounod:
  - George Dandin, after the comedy George Dandin by Molière, unfinished (?), 1874
- Pietro Mascagni:
  - Guglielmo Ratcliff after Heinrich Heine in the Italian translation by Andrea Maffei, 1895
  - Parisina after Gabriele d’Annunzio, 1913
- Claude Debussy: Pelléas et Mélisande after Maurice Maeterlinck, 1902
- Richard Strauss:
  - Salome after Oscar Wilde, 1905
  - Elektra after Hugo von Hofmannsthal, 1909
- Alberto Franchetti:
  - La figlia di Iorio after Gabriele d’Annunzio, 1906
- Nadia Boulanger / Raoul Pugno, La ville morte after the drama La città morta by Gabriele d’Annunzio, composed 1914, first performance 2008
- Riccardo Zandonai:
  - Francesca da Rimini after Gabriele d’Annunzio, 1914
- Ildebrando Pizzetti:
  - Gigliola after Gabriele d’Annunzio’s drama La fiaccola sotto il moggio (1914, unfinished)
  - Fedra after Gabriele d’Annunzio, 1915
  - La figlia di Iorio after Gabriele d’Annunzio, 1954
  - Assassinio nella cattedrale after Thomas Stearns Eliot in der Übersetzung von Alberto Castelli, 1958
- Alexander von Zemlinsky: Eine florentinische Tragödie after Oscar Wilde, 1917
- Italo Montemezzi:
  - La nave after Gabriele d’Annunzio, 1918
- Domenico Alaleona:
  - Mirra (Alaleona) after the tragedy by Vittorio Alfieri, 1920
- Sergei Prokofiev: The Love for Three Oranges after Carlo Gozzi’s fiaba teatrale L'amore delle tre melarance, 1921
- Darius Milhaud, Les Euménides after the drama The Eumenides by Aischylos, composed 1917–1922, performed 1949
- Paul Hindemith
  - Mörder, Hoffnung der Frauen after the drama Mörder, Hoffnung der Frauen (1907) by Oskar Kokoschka, 1921
  - Sancta Susanna after the drama Sancta Susanna (1913) by August Stramm, 1922
  - The Long Christmas Dinner after the play The Long Christmas Dinner (1931) by Thornton Wilder, 1963
- Alban Berg:
  - Wozzeck after Georg Büchner’s Woyzeck, 1925
  - Lulu after Frank Wedekind’s plays Erdgeist and Die Büchse der Pandora, 1937
- Manfred Gurlitt:
  - Wozzeck after Georg Büchner’s Woyzeck, 1926
  - Soldaten after the drama Die Soldaten (Lenz) by Jakob Michael Reinhold Lenz, 1930
- Arthur Honegger
  - Antigone (Honegger) after Jean Cocteau, 1927
- Othmar Schoeck:
  - Penthesilea after Heinrich von Kleist’s drama Penthesilea (Kleist) (1808), 1927
- Franco Alfano
  - Cyrano de Bergerac after Edmond Rostand, 1936
- Bohuslav Martinů
  - Julietta after the play Juliette, ou La clé des songes by Georges Neveux, 1935
  - Mirandolina after Carlo Goldoni's 1751 comedy La locandiera, 1959.
  - Ariane after the play Le Voyage de Thésée ( 1943) by Georges Neveux, 1961
- Francis Poulenc:
  - Les mamelles de Tirésias after Guillaume Apollinaire, 1941
  - La voix humaine after Jean Cocteau, 1958
- Carl Orff:
  - Antigonae after the drama by Sophokles in the German translation by Friedrich Hölderlin (1804), 1949
  - Oedipus der Tyrann after the drama by Sophokles in the German translation by Friedrich Hölderlin (1804), 1959
  - Prometheus after the drama by Aischylos, 1968
- Werner Egk:
  - Irische Legende after The Countess Cathleen by William Butler Yeats, 1955
  - Der Revisor after the comedy The Government Inspector (Ревизор) by Nikolai Gogol, 1957
  - Siebzehn Tage und vier Minuten after the comedy El mayor encanto, amor by Pedro Calderón de la Barca, 1966
- Wolfgang Fortner:
  - Bluthochzeit after Bodas de sangre by Federico García Lorca, 1957
  - In seinem Garten liebt Don Perlimplin Belisa after Amor de don Perlimplín con Belisa en su jardín by Federico García Lorca, 1962
  - That Time after the play That Time by Samuel Beckett, 1967
- Benjamin Britten: A Midsummer Night's Dream after William Shakespeare, 1960
- Hans Werner Henze:
  - Das Wundertheater after El retablo de las maravillas by Miguel de Cervantes, 1949
  - König Hirsch after the fiaba teatrale Il Re cervo (1762) by Carlo Gozzi, 1956
  - Der Prinz von Homburg after the drama Prinz Friedrich von Homburg oder die Schlacht bei Fehrbellin by Heinrich von Kleist, 1960
  - Die Bassariden after the drama Βάκχαι (The Bacchae) by Euripides, 1966
- Bernd Alois Zimmermann: Die Soldaten after the drama Die Soldaten (Lenz) by Jakob Michael Reinhold Lenz, 1965
- Gottfried von Einem:
  - Dantons Tod after the drama Dantons Tod by Georg Büchner, 1947
  - Der Besuch der alten Dame after the tragicomedy Der Besuch der alten Dame by Friedrich Dürrenmatt, 1971
  - Kabale und Liebe after the play Kabale und Liebe by Friedrich Schiller, 1976
- Boris Blacher:
  - Romeo und Julia after the tragedy by William Shakespeare, 1950
  - Preußisches Märchen after the comedy Der Hauptmann von Köpenick by Carl Zuckmayer, 1952
  - Yvonne, Prinzessin von Burgund after Witold Gombrowicz, 1973
- Giselher Klebe:
  - Die Räuber after the tragedy by Friedrich Schiller, 1957
  - Die Ermordung Cäsars after Julius Caesar (play) by William Shakespeare, 1959
  - Alkmene after Amphitryon by Heinrich von Kleist, 1961
  - Figaro lässt sich scheiden after the comedy Figaro lässt sich scheiden by Ödön von Horváth, 1963
  - Jacobowsky und der Oberst after the comedy Jacobowsky und der Oberst by Franz Werfel, 1965
  - Ein wahrer Held after The Playboy of the Western World by John Millington Synge, 1975
  - Das Mädchen aus Domrémy after the drama Die Jungfrau von Orléans by Friedrich Schiller, 1976
  - Der Jüngste Tag after Ödön von Horváth, 1980
- Hugo Weisgall:
  - Six Characters in Search of an Author after the drama Six Characters in Search of an Author by Luigi Pirandello, 1959
- Sylvano Bussotti
  - Lorenzaccio after the drama Lorenzaccio by Alfred de Musset, 1972
  - Le Racine after the drama Phèdre by Jean Racine, 1980
  - Fedra after the drama Phèdre by Jean Racine, 1988
  - Tieste after the drama Thyestes by Lucius Annaeus Seneca, 2000
- Aribert Reimann:
  - Ein Traumspiel after August Strindberg’s drama Ett drömspel, 1964
  - Melusine after Yvan Goll, 1970
  - Lear after William Shakespeare’s drama King Lear, 1978
  - Die Gespenstersonate after August Strindberg’s drama Spöksonaten, 1983
  - Troades after the drama The Trojan Women by Euripides in the translation by Franz Werfel, 1985
  - Das Schloß after Franz Kafka’s novel Das Schloß and its theatre version by Max Brod, 1991
  - Bernarda Albas Haus after Federico García Lorca’s drama The House of Bernarda Alba, 2000
  - Medea after the third part of Franz Grillparzer's trilogy The Golden Fleece, 2010
  - L'Invisible (after Maurice Maeterlinck's L'Intruse, L'Intérieur and La Mort de Tintagiles), 2017
- Wolfgang Rihm:
  - Faust und Yorick nach Jean Tardieu, 1977
- Walter Steffens:
  - Eli after the mystery play by Nelly Sachs, 1967
  - Unter dem Milchwald after Under Milk Wood by Dylan Thomas, 1973
- Adriana Hölszky:
  - Bremer Freiheit after Rainer Werner Fassbinder, 1988
  - Die Wände after the drama Les paravents by Jean Genet, 1995
- Michèle Reverdy, Le Précepteur after the play Der Hofmeister by Jakob Michael Reinhold Lenz, 1990
- Michael Denhoff: Der Pelikan after August Strindberg, 1992
- Manfred Trojahn:
  - Enrico after the drama Enrico IV by Luigi Pirandello, 1991
  - Was ihr wollt after Shakespeare’s Twelfth Night, 1998
  - Orest after the drama Orestes by Euripides, 2011
- Toshio Hosokawa
  - Hanjo after the Nô-drama 班女 (Hanjo, 1955) by Yukio Mishima (三島 由紀夫) in a translation by Donald Keene, 2004
  - Matsukaze, after the Nô-drama 松風 (Matsukaze) by Zeami Motokiyo (世阿弥 元清), 2011
- Luca Francesconi, Quartet after the drama Quartett by Heiner Müller, 2011
- Marc-André Dalbavie, Le Soulier de satin after the drama Le Soulier de satin (1931) by Paul Claudel, 2021

== Literaturopern based on novels and short stories ==
- Frederick Delius: A Village Romeo and Juliet after Gottfried Keller's Romeo und Julia auf dem Dorfe, 1907
- Leoš Janáček:
  - Káťa Kabanová after Alexander Ostrovsky, 1921
  - From the House of the Dead (Z mrtvého domu) after Fyodor Dostoevsky, 1930
- Dmitri Shostakovich:
  - Нос (The Nose) after the comedy by Nikolai Gogol
  - Леди Макбет Мценского уезда (Lady Macbeth of Mtsensk) after Nikolai Leskov's novel Ledy Macbeth Mtsenskovo uyezda, 1934
- Benjamin Britten:
  - Billy Budd after Herman Melville, 1951
  - Death in Venice after Thomas Mann's novel Tod in Venedig, 1973
- Gottfried von Einem: Der Prozess based on the novel Der Process by Franz Kafka, 1953
- Giselher Klebe:
  - Die tödlichen Wünsche after the novel La peau de chagrin von Honoré de Balzac, 1959
  - Das Märchen von der schönen Lilie after Goethe, 1969
- Werner Egk: Die Verlobung in San Domingo after the novel Die Verlobung in St. Domingo von Heinrich von Kleist, 1963
- Boris Blacher:
  - Das Geheimnis des entwendeten Briefes after the novel The Purloined Letter by Edgar Allan Poe, 1975
  - Die Flut nach einer Erzählung von Guy de Maupassant, 1947
- Hans Werner Henze:
  - Ein Landarzt, radio opera after Franz Kafka, 1951
  - Boulevard Solitude after the novel Histoire du Chevalier Des Grieux et de Manon Lescaut by Abbé Prévost, 1952
  - Der junge Lord based on the short story Der Affe als Mensch by Wilhelm Hauff, 1965
  - Pollicino based on a fairytale by Charles Perrault, 1980
  - Das verratene Meer, after Yukio Mishima's The Sailor Who Fell from Grace with the Sea (午後の曳航 – Gogo no Eiko), 1986–89
- Wolfgang Rihm:
  - Jakob Lenz after the novella Lenz by Georg Büchner, 1979
  - Die Hamletmaschine based on Heiner Müller's text Die Hamletmaschine (1977), 1987
  - Die Eroberung von Mexico based on Antonin Artaud's 1932 texts La conquête du Mexique and Le théâtre de Séraphin, 1992
  - Dionysos based on Friedrich Nietzsche's Dionysian-Dithyrambs, 2010
- Aribert Reimann: Das Schloß after Franz Kafka’s novel Das Schloß and its theatre version by Max Brod, 1991
- Hans Zender: Don Quijote de la Mancha after Miguel de Cervantes, 1993
- Heinz Holliger: Schneewittchen after Robert Walser, 1998

== Bibliography ==
- Vincenzo Borghetti/Riccardo Pecci, Il bacio della sfinge. D'Annunzio, Pizzetti e »Fedra«, EDT, Torino 1998.
- Literaturoper by Julian Budden, in 'The New Grove Dictionary of Opera', ed. Stanley Sadie (London, 1992) ISBN 0-333-73432-7
- Carl Dahlhaus: Vom Musikdrama zur Literaturoper. Aufsätze zur neueren Operngeschichte. Überarbeitete Neuausgabe. Piper u. a., München u. a. 1989, ISBN 3-7957-8238-4 (Serie Piper 8238).
- Swantje Gostomzyk: Literaturoper am Ende des 20. Jahrhunderts. Eine interdisziplinäre Studie am Beispiel der Opern von Detlev Glanert. Lang, Frankfurt am Main 2009.
- Adriana Guarnieri Corazzol, Musica e letteratura in Italia tra Ottocento e Novecento, Sansoni, Milano 2000.
- Hugh Macdonald: The Prose Libretto, In: Cambridge Opera Journal 1, 1989, pp. 155–166.
- Jürgen Maehder: The Origins of Italian »Literaturoper« ─ »Guglielmo Ratcliff«, »La figlia di Iorio«, »Parisina« and »Francesca da Rimini«, in: Arthur Groos/Roger Parker (edd.), Reading Opera, Princeton University Press, Princeton 1988, pp. 92–128.
- Jürgen Maehder: Drammaturgia musicale e strutture narrative nel teatro musicale italiano della generazaione dell'Ottanta, in: Mila De Santis (ed.), Alfredo Casella e l'Europa. Atti del Convegno internazionale di Studi a Siena, 7-9 giugno 2001, Olschki, Firenze 2003, pp. 223–248.
- Jürgen Maehder: »Salome« von Oscar Wilde und Richard Strauss ─ Die Entstehungsbedingungen der sinfonischen Literaturoper des Fin de siècle, in: Jürgen Kühnel/Ulrich Müller/Sigrid Schmidt (edd.), Richard Strauss, »Salome«: Stofftraditionen, Text und Musik, Müller-Speiser Anif/Salzburg 2013, pp. 55–107.
- Peter Petersen: Der Terminus „Literaturoper“ – eine Begriffsbestimmung. In: Archiv für Musikwissenschaft 56, 1999, pp. 52–70.
- Olaf Roth: Die Opernlibretti nach Dramen d'Annunzios, Peter Lang, Bern/Frankfurt/New York 1999.
- Richard Taruskin: Realism as Preached and Practiced – The Russian Opera Dialogue. In: Musical Quarterly, 56, 1970.
- Jürg Stenzl: Heinrich von Kleists Penthesilea in der Vertonung von Ottmar Schoeck. In Günter Schnitzler (Hrsg.): Dichtung und Musik – Kaleidoskop ihrer Beziehungen. Klett-Cotta, 1979, p. 224 sqq.
- Almut Ullrich: Die „Literaturoper“ von 1970–1990. Texte und Tendenzen. Noetzel, Wilhelmshaven 1991, ISBN 3-7959-0617-2 (Veröffentlichungen zur Musikforschung 11).
- Sigrid Wiesmann (ed.): Für und Wider die Literaturoper. Zur Situation nach 1945. Laaber-Verlag, Laaber 1982, ISBN 3-921518-67-9 (Thurnauer Schriften zum Musiktheater 6).
