= Henning Schlüter =

German actor (born 1927)

- Born: Henning Behrend Schlüter; 1 March 1927; Hamburg, Germany
- Died: July 5, 2000 (aged 73); Hamburg, Germany
- Occupation: Actor
- Years active: 1947–2000

Henning Behrend Schlüter (1 March 1927 – 20 July 2000) was a prolific German character actor known for his role in the 1979 screen adaptation of Günter Grass's The Tin Drum and in the long-running German TV police procedural, The Old Fox (1977).

== Early life and career ==
Born in Hamburg on March 1, 2027, Schlüter was the son of Hilda Maria (née Framheim) and Otto Franz Schlüter.

From 1949 to 1952, Schlüter performed with the Berliner Ensemble under Bertold Brecht, where he appeared in 1951, as Fritz von Berg in Brecht's adaptation of Jakob Lenz's The Tutor. Other notable stage credits include a 1962 double bill of one-act plays at Berlin's Schiller Theater, featuring Tankred Dorst's Tirade at the Town Hall and Polish playwirght Tadeusz Różewicz's The Card Index, the former staged by a young Peter Zadek and the latter by trans-Atlantic stage and screen veteran, William Dieterle, the former work had Schlüter cast—amidst a quartet of uniformly generic character handles–as "Fat Officer", and the latter, simply "Fat Man".

Schlüter's command of English afforded him employment both as a German language dubber on Hollywood imports and as a credible and cost-effective alternative to English or American actors in German productions, for characters such as Inspector Bradley in an episode of globe-trotting German TV spy series John Kling, and Robinson in the 1996 horror comedy Killer Condom. It also allowed him to provide German language translations of works such as Earl Stanley Gardner's The Case of the Cautious Coquette, as well as a number of works of Art Buchwald.

Other screen credits include Dr. Bauer in Billy Wilder's One, Two, Three, Catone in Roman Polanski's What?, Dr. Richter in A Lost Life, Dr. Bruno Schefold in Winterspelt, Ludwig Erhard in The Odessa File, and the bridge player in Ash Wednesday

== Personal life and death ==
Schlüter died on July 20, 2000 at the age of 73. His remains are interred at Friedhof Hamburg-Ohlsdorf.

== Partial filmography ==
- The Blue Swords (1947) as Apothekerlehrling
- Cinderella (1955)
- Dr. Knock (1960) as Zweiter Bauernbursche
- Destination Death (1961)
- One, Two, Three (1961) as Dr. Bauer
- Three Penny Opera (1963) as Reverend Kimball
- What? (1972) as Catone
- Ludwig (1973) as Minister Pfistermeister
- Ash Wednesday (1973) as Bridge Player
- The Odessa File (1974) as Ludwig Erhard (uncredited)
- One Woman's Lover (1974) as Count
- The Last Word (1975) as Dr. Schatz
- The Old Fox (TV series)
  - 43 episodes (1977–1984) as Franz Millinger
- Winterspelt (1978) as Dr. Bruno Schefold
- The Tin Drum (1979) as Dr. Hollatz
- Das Rätsel der Sandbank (TV series)
  - 3 episodes (1985) as Sir James
- The Country Doctor (TV series)
  - Ep. "Nachwuchs" (1987) as Herr Nölting
- Der Schatz im Niemandsland (TV series)
  - 4 episodes (1987) as Antiquitätenhändler Haberlitz
- Lenin...The Train (TV film, 1988) as Deutscher General (as Henning Schlueter)
- A Quiet Conspiracy (TV miniseries, 1989)
  - 2 episodes as Andrei Brand, Andrea Brand
- Traffik (TV miniseries, 1989)
  - 1 episode as Old Policeman (as Henning Schluter)
- Schwarz Rot Gold (TV series)
  - Ep. "Hammelsprung" (1990) as Prof. Brunner
- Zwei Münchner in Hamburg (TV series)
  - Ep. "Endlich Verheiratet" (1991) as Pastor
- Leonie Löwenherz
  - 19 episodes (1991) as Prof. Laurenz Carolus Lehmann
- Blankenese (TV series)
  - Ep. "Katerfrühstück" (1994) as Vermieter
- Immenhof (TV series)
  - 2 episodes (1994, 1995) as Amtsrighter
- Peter Strohm (TV series)
  - Ep. "Die Grafin" (1995) as Kriminalrat Schuster
- Killer Condom (1997) as Robinson
