= Hofmeister (office) =

Holy Roman official or schoolmaster

In medieval Europe, within the Holy Roman Empire, a Hofmeister (literally "court-master" or "house-master" in German; Latin: Magister, Praefectus curiae; Danish: hofmester, hovmester, Swedish: hovmästare, Czech: hofmistr, Polish: ochmistrz; French: précepteur; Italian: precettore / istitutore) was an official who acted as an aide to royalty or to a senior nobleman or cleric. Later it became a term for a schoolmaster who looked after the welfare of students, in addition to their education.

== Roles ==
=== In the service of royalty and other magnates ===
A Hofmeister was one of the highest offices in the courts of German emperors and kings, and also existed in other princely courts and the courts of smaller dynasties. His official role was initially in the direction of the royal household and serving privately on the monarch's person. In the 15th century it became a government office and in the German princely courts finally became equivalent to a privy counsellor or cabinet minister, and sometimes as something like the Master of the Household in the modern British royal court.

=== In the service of prelates ===
A Hofmeister was also the title given to someone who acted as an adlatus or aide to his abbot in a monastery.

=== In service of education ===
Later a Hofmeister could also be a house-tutor, also responsible for the care of his students beyond their education. Even now, in some areas, an administrator for a greater good is known as a hofmeister when he would otherwise be called a house-tutor.

== Theatre ==
It gave its name to Der Hofmeister, a play by Jakob Michael Reinhold Lenz.

== See also ==
- Majordomo

== Sources ==
- Meyers Konversations-Lexikon

== Literature ==
- Ludwig Fertig: Die Hofmeister. Ein Beitrag zur Geschichte des Lehrerstandes und der bürgerlichen Intelligenz. Metzler, Stuttgart, 1979, ISBN 3-476-00437-6.
- Gerhard Seeliger: Das deutsche Hofmeisteramt im späten Mittelalter, Innsbruck, 1887; Reprint: British Library, Historical Print Editions 2011, ISBN 978-1-241-46612-1.
- Jakob Michael Reinhold Lenz: Der Hofmeister, Tragikomödie, 1774.
- Johann Christian Müller: Meines Lebens Vorfälle und Neben-Umstände 2. Teil: Hofmeister in Pommern (1746-1755), Lehmstedt, Leipzig, 2013, ISBN 3-942473-04-6.
