= Soldaten (Gurlitt) =

Soldaten is a 1930 opera in 3 acts by Manfred Gurlitt after the play of Jakob Michael Reinhold Lenz. It was premiered 9 November 1930, Düsseldorf, but later overshadowed by Bernd Alois Zimmermann's setting of Die Soldaten (1965).

== Recordings ==
- Soldaten, Burt, Wesener, Barainsky, Müller, Mohr, Rundfunkchor Berlin, Deutsches SO Berlin, Gerd Albrecht 1998 Orfeo
