= Lemi Ponifasio =

Samoan artist

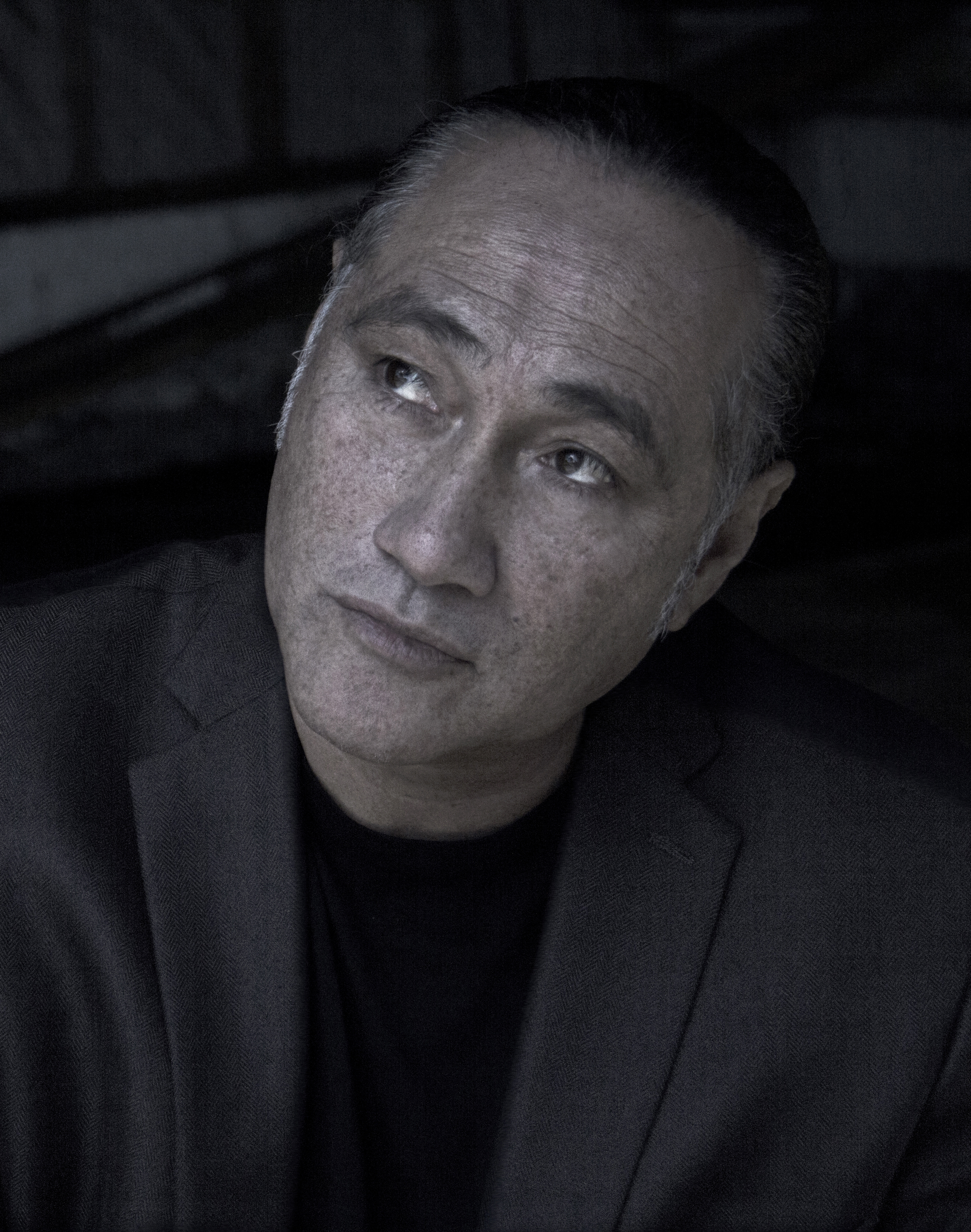
Lemi Ponifasio (2016)

Salā Lemi Ponifasio is a Samoan theatre director, choreographer, and artist who works internationally. He is known for his radical approach to theatre, dance, art and activism, and for his collaboration with communities. He founded the performing arts company MAU.

== Early life and education ==
Salā Lemi Ponifasio was born in Lano, Samoa. He moved to New Zealand when he was 15 years old.

While at high school in New Zealand he started to attend a series of workshops with the Maori Matua Tohunga master artist Irirangi Tiakiawa in Rotoiti. Ponifasio was then invited by Maori performing arts leader Tama Huata to work with him as part of his Maori cultural group Takitimu Trust, performing in communities throughout New Zealand and in reservations in Canada.

== Career ==
Ponifasio began his artistic career as an avant-garde experimental performer, staging his epic ten-year solo dance investigation Body in Crisis, primarily in non-theatrical and outdoor spaces.

His brief encounter with modern dance, butoh, and classical ballet in the 1980s made him skeptical about the notion of contemporary dance and launched his search for the origin of his own dance. He started to travel the world and danced continuously.

He explored the life of the body through cosmic vision, genealogy, philosophy, architecture, chant, dance and ceremonies of indigenous communities, especially Maori, Kiribati, Kanaky people of New Caledonia, Samoa, Tonga, Tahiti and the diverse islands of the Pacific region.

After a decade of travelling, living and performing in many countries, Ponifasio returned to New Zealand. Reading Maori rights activist Eva Rickard 'squote "only dead fish flow with the current", he decided to call his first group performance work Fish of the Day.

Ponifasio formed MAU - the philosophical foundation and direction of his work, the name of his work, and the communities he works with. MAU is a Samoan word that means the declaration to the truth of a matter as an effort to transform. With a group of young performers and friends, Ponifasio created Illumina as the first work of MAU performed at the Galaxy Theatre, Auckland in 1992. MAU focuses on arts and culture, avant-garde, and philosophy.

Ponifasio's collaborators are people from all walks of life; the works are performed in factories, remote villages, opera houses, schools, marae, castles, galleries, and stadiums. His projects have included fully staged operas, theatre, dance, exhibitions, community forums and festivals in more than 40 countries. One of Ponifasio's longtime collaborators for over 25 years is lighting designer Helen Todd, and light is often mentioned in reviews of the work of MAU. At the forefront of the international art scene, Ponifasio performs and exhibits his work worldwide including the Festival d'Avignon, BAM Brooklyn Academy of Music New York, Ruhrtriennale, Lincoln Center for the Performing Arts New York, Edinburgh International Festival, Theater der Welt, Théâtre de la Ville Paris, Onassis Cultural Centre Athens, London's Southbank Centre, Holland Festival, Carriageworks Sydney, Luminato Festival in Toronto, Vienna Festival, Berliner Festspiele, Santiago a Mil Chile, the Venice Biennale, and in the Pacific region.

While established within the international avant-garde, Ponifasio grounds his work within local communities and Māori and diverse Oceanic cultures.

=== Works ===
Ponifasio's works include: Song Of The Earth (2023) with Pacific communities and the New Zealand Symphony Orchestra; Chosen and Beloved (2020) with MAU Wāhine and NZ Symphony Orchestra; Jerusalem (2020); House Of Night and Day (2020) exhibition at Museum of New Zealand Te Papa Tongarewa; Transfigured Night (2020) with MAU Wāhine, Hawke's Bay Orchestra, Kahurangi Māori Dance and the Huata Whānau; Love To Death / Amor a la muerte (2020) with MAU Mapuche; KANAKA (2019) with Theatre Du Kanaky; choreography for staging of Idomeneo (Mozart) at Salzburg Festival (2019); Mausina (2018) with MAU Wāhine; Standing in Time (2017) a mauopera with MAU Wāhine; Die Gabe Der Kinder (2017) with children and community of Hamburg; Lagimoana (2015) for the 56th Venice Biennale Visual Arts Exhibition; Apocalypsis (2015) with music of R. Murray Schafer at the Luminato Festival, Toronto; I AM: Mapuche (2015) and Ceremonia de Memorias (2016) with MAU Mapuche the indigenous people of Chile; I AM (2014) for the 100th Anniversary of WW1, premiered at the Avignon Festival and followed by seasons at such places as the Edinburgh International Festival and the Ruhrtriennale, Germany.

Other MAU creations include The Crimson House (2014), probing the nature of power and a world that sees all and no longer forgets; Stones in Her Mouth (2013), a mauopera with Maori women as transmitters of a life force through oratory and ancient chants; Orff's opera Prometheus for the Ruhrtriennale (2012); Le Savali: Berlin (2011), confronting the imperial City of Berlin with its own communities of immigrant families in search of belonging and constrained by threat of deportation; Birds With Skymirrors (2010), responding to the disappearing Pacific Islands, homelands to most of his performers and devastated by climate change; and Tempest: Without A Body (2008), concerning power and terror and the unlawful use of state power post 9/11.

== Recognition and awards ==
In 2023, Ponifasio became a World Theatre Ambassador of the International Theatre Institute (ITI).

In 2016, ITI invited Ponifasio to write the official message for International Dance Day.

The work I AM MAPUCHE was recognized by the Circle of Art Critics of Chile as Best International Production of 2015 in the theater category. The show was produced as a co-production of Fundación Teatro a Mil and the MAU company, and it premiered in the scope of festival Santiago a Mil.

Ponifasio was the Arts Foundation of New Zealand Laureate in 2011, and was the recipient of the Senior Pacific Artist Award in 2012, courtesy of the Creative New Zealand Arts Pasifika Awards.

== Works ==
World premieres by Ponifasio:

- 2023 Song Of The Earth · Michael Fowler Centre; Wellington, New Zealand
- 2020 Chosen and Beloved · MAU Wāhine; New Zealand Festival; Michael Fowler Centre; Wellington, New Zealand
- 2020 Jerusalem · New Zealand Festival of the Arts, Toi Whakaari, Oper Köln and Akademie der Künste der Welt Köln; Wellington Opera, New Zealand
- 2020 House of Night and Day · exhibition at the Museum of New Zealand Te Papa Tongarewa; Wellington, New Zealand
- 2020 Transfigured Night · MAU Wāhine; Bay Arts Festival, New Zealand
- 2020 Love To Death (Amor a la muerte) · MAU Mapuche; Barcelona Grec Festival and Teatro a Mil Foundation produduction; Santiago de Chile, Chile
- 2019 KANAKA · Theatre Du Kanaky; New Caledonia
- 2019 Mozart, Idomeneo · choreography for opera production Idomeneo; Salzburg Festival; Salzburg, Austria
- 2018 Mausina · MAU Wāhine; for the 125th Anniversary of Women's Suffrage in New Zealand; NZ Parliament, Wellington, New Zealand
- 2017 Vanimonimo · Louvre Abu Dhabi; Abu Dabi, UAE
- 2017 Die Gabe Der Kinder · Theater Der Welt; Hamburg, Germany
- 2017 Standing In Time, mauopera · Festspielhaus St Pölten; St Pölten, Austria
- 2016 Ceremonia De Memorias · MAU Mapuche; Festival Santiago A Mil; Santiago de Chile, Chile
- 2016 Recompose · KunstFestSpiele Herrenhausen; Hannover, Germany
- 2015 Apocalypsis (with music by R. Murray Schafer) · Luminato Festival; Toronto, Canada
- 2015 Lagimoana · Venice Biennale 56th Visual Arts Exhibition; Venice, Italy
- 2015 I AM Mapuche · MAU Mapuche; Festival Santiago A Mil; Santiago de Chile, Chile
- 2014 I AM · Festival d’Avignon; Avignon, France
- 2014 The Crimson House · New Zealand Festival; Wellington, New Zealand
- 2013 Stones In Her Mouth, mauopera · REDCAT Radar L. A. Festival; Los Angeles, USA
- 2012 Prometheus (Prometheus by Carl Orff) · Ruhrtriennale; Duisburg, Germany
- 2011 Le Savali: Berlin · Berliner Festspiele; Berlin, Germany
- 2011 Le Savali Videoinstallation · Berliner Festspiele; Berlin, Germany
- 2010 Birds With Skymirrors · Theater Der Welt; Essen, Germany
- 2010 Tempest: Without a Body · Sydney Festival; Sydney, Australia
- 2008 Fale Aitu/Phantom House · Lift London International Festival of Theatre; London, UK
- 2008 I AM Tuhoe · Te Rewarewa Marae; Ruatoki, New Zealand
- 2008 Tempest II · Kunstenfestivaldesarts; Brussels, Belgium
- 2008 The Loss of Civil Liberties · KVS Royal Flemish Theatre; Brussels, Belgium
- 2007 Woven Flesh: Oceania Exhibit · Prague Quadrennial; Prague, CZ
- 2007 Tempest · Vienna Festival; Vienna, Austria
- 2006 Requiem · New Crowned Hope, 250th Mozart Anniversary; Vienna, Austria
- 2006 Vasa · St Paul Street Gallery; Auckland, New Zealand
- 2003 Paradise · Venice Theatre Biennale; Venice, Italy
- 2003 Vasa: Oceania Exhibit · Prague Quadrennial; Prague, CZ
- 2003 Threshold Wall: Heart of PQ · Prague Quadrennial; Prague, CZ
- 2003 Haka: Heart of PQ · Prague Quadrennial; Prague, CZ
- 2002 Bone Flute · Adelaide Festival; Adelaide, Australia
- 2001 Land · Tjibaou Cultural Centre; New Caledonia
- 2002 Bone Flute Ivi Ivi · Maidment Theatre; Auckland, New Zealand
- 1999 Landing: New Zealand Exhibit · Prague Quadrennial; Prague, CZ
- 1999 Rise · Winter Garden; Auckland, New Zealand
- 1998 Ava · Maidment Theatre; Auckland, New Zealand
- 1998 Light · WOMAD; Auckland, New Zealand
- 1997 Sacred Hill · Taupo Festival; Taupo, New Zealand
- 1996 The Ancient Mother · MADD Gallery; Appia, Samoa
- 1996 Lo’omatua · Maidment Theatre; Auckland, New Zealand
- 1995 Illumina: Embracing The Darkness · Herald Theatre, Aotea Centre; Auckland, New Zealand
- 1992 Illumina · Galaxy Theatre; Auckland, New Zealand
- 1991 Fish of the Day Galaxy Theatre, Auckland, Taki Rua Theatre, Wellington; New Zealand
- 1987–1996 Solo Work - Body in Crisis · diverse countries

== MAUForum and Pacific Thought Symposium ==
- 2010 5th Pacific Thought Symposium: Bringing Forth the Ancestors · Sydney’s Indigenous and Pacific communities, Seymour Centre; Sydney, Australia
- 2010 MAUForum: The Event of the Self/Other_{,} Ceremony and celebration with artists and audience (Production commissioned by spielzeit'europa | Berliner Festspiele in cooperation with Berliner Residenz Konzerte, IMaGE Konzertveranstaltungs GmbH)
- 2007 MAUForum: Moana Roa; Auckland, New Zealand
- 2006 MAUForum: Opus Dei; Auckland, New Zealand
- 2006–present: Pacific Thought Symposium
- 2005–present: MAUForum

--- end of commenting out--->
