= Manfred Gurlitt =

German and Japanese conductor (1890–1972)

External audio
- Shellac recordings with Manfred Gurlitt in the Online Archive of the Österreichische Mediathek

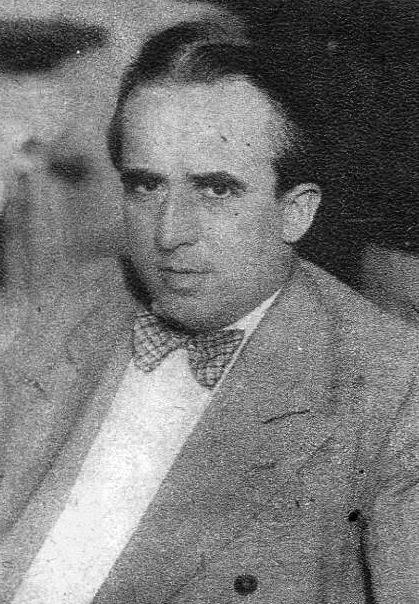
Manfred Gurlitt in 1942

Manfred Gurlitt (6 September 1890 – 29 April 1972) was a German opera composer and conductor. He studied composition with Engelbert Humperdinck and conducting with Karl Muck. He spent most of his career in Japan.

== Life ==
Manfred Ludwig Hugo Andreas Gurlitt was born in Berlin on 6 September 1890 to the art dealer Fritz Gurlitt (1854-1893) and Annarella Gurlitt (1856-1935). The Gurlitt family included many who distinguished themselves in the arts. Manfred was the cousin of musicologist Wilibald Gurlitt (1889-1963) and the great-nephew of the composer Cornelius Gurlitt. Another cousin was Hildebrand Gurlitt (1895–1956), an art dealer who was one of a very few authorized by the Nazis to deal in "degenerate art" and whose holdings of art works looted from Jews during the years of Nazi rule came to light in the 21st century.

He studied composition for a time with Engelbert Humperdinck and music theory with Hans Hermann and Hugo Kaun. From 1908 to 1910, he was a coach at the Berlin Court Opera and in 1911 acted as musical assistant to Karl Muck at Bayreuth. In 1911-12, he was second conductor in Essen, then in Augsburg for two years. in 1914 he was given the post of first conductor at the Bremen Stadttheater, a position he held until he became general music director there in 1924. In 1920 he founded a Society for New Music in Bremen to encourage avant-garde and rarely heard pre-classical works. His first opera Die Heilige, set in 12th-century Japan, premiered in Bremen in 1920.

His opera Wozzeck after the play by Georg Büchner premiered with Gurlitt conducting in Bremen on 22 April 1926 four months after the opera of the same title by Alban Berg. Berg called it "not bad or unoriginal" but added that "the broth in the kettle of this opera, that is, in the orchestra, is too watered down". Like Berg, he used selected scenes from the play, added a lengthy elegy after Wozzeck's death, and added an epilogue. He used an offstage choir of sopranos that, in addition to commenting on the action, began and ended the opera with the text "we poor people". Unlike Berg, he provided a distinct musical setting for each scene without connecting interludes. In another assessment, "Musically, he stands closer to Strauss and Hindemith than to Schoenberg. His instrumentation is less sophisticated and complex than Berg's; his orchestra is subordinated to an accompanying role in the drama".

Gurlitt's work attracted much attention at the time and marked the zenith of Gurlitt's career. Malicious gossip, charges of "debauchery and loose living", caused him to move to Berlin in 1927 where he taught at the Charlottenburg Musikhochschule and conducted for the Staatsoper, Krolloper, Max Reinhardt's Deutsches Theater, and Berlin Radio.

He wrote Die Soldaten (1930) based the 1776 play by Jakob Michael Reinhold Lenz and Nana (1932) based on the novel by Émile Zola. In the former he anticipated the operatic treatment of the same Lenz play by Bernd Alois Zimmermann, which premiered in 1965. In Nana he took on a subject similar to Berg's Lulu, also written 1933, but not premiered till 1937. Gurlitt's Nana had a libretto by Max Brod, and productions were cancelled because Brod's Judaism and Zola's politics offended Nazi ideology in Cologne and Mannheim.

Gurlitt's music was banned by the Nazis when they assumed power, but his presence in Berlin was tolerated as he undertook to bring his music in line with the aesthetics of the Third Reich. His mother Annarella tried to satisfy the Nazis of his non-Jewish heritage by certifying first that his Jewish paternal grandmother had converted to Protestantism and second that Gurlitt was not the son of Fritz Gurlitt, but of Willi Waldecker, the man Annarella married not long after Fritz died in 1893. Manfred Gurlitt was accepted as a member of the Nazi party on 1 May 1933. He was ejected from the party by court order on 3 May 1937. The court declared that Gurlitt was a "Jew of Mixed Race of the 2nd Order". German authorities frustrated his attempts to secure a teaching position in Japan for months, until he managed win readmission to the Reichsmusikkammer (State Music Institute) and proposed a trip abroad for "study, observation, and documentary" activities. He emigrated in April 1939 and arrived in Yokohama, Japan, with his third wife on 23 May. Japan was then an ally of Germany, both soon to become parties to the Axis Pact in September 1940.

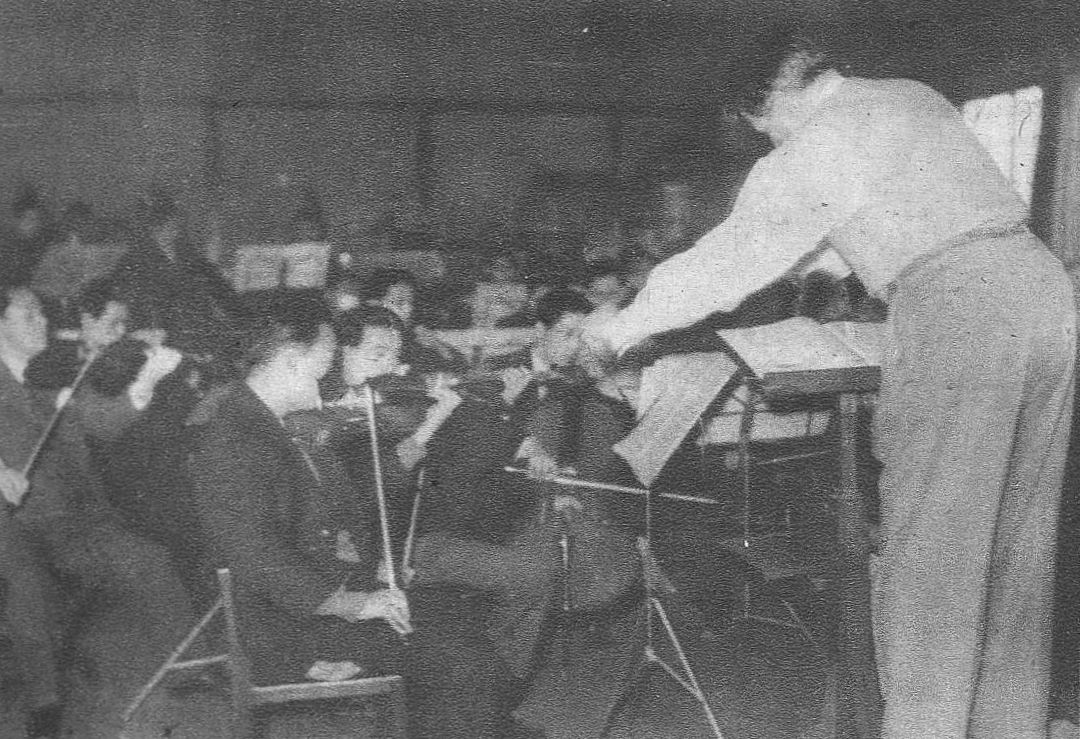
Gurlitt in rehearsal with the Tokyo Philharmonic Orchestra, 1942

Gurlitt became active as an opera conductor with Fujiwara Yoshie's company, the Fujiwara Opera. In 1940, he became musical director of the Tokyo Philharmonic Orchestra. In these positions he presented the Japanese premieres of many works from the standard repertoire by Mozart, Wagner, and Richard Strauss. Gurlitt's attitude to the Nazi regime remained equivocal, and he was a regular guest at the German Embassy in Tokyo. In 1952 he founded the Gurlitt Opera Company in Tokyo, which had for its official opening the Japan premier of Mozart's The Magic Flute in February 1953. In 1957, it presented the first staging of Der Rosenkavalier in Japan. Other Japanese premieres he produced and conducted, and sometimes directed, included Eugene Onegin (1949), Falstaff (1951), Otello (1953), Werther (1955), Die Entführung aus dem Serail (1956), Die Meistersinger von Nürnberg (1960), and Salome (1962).

Gurlitt conducted the world premiere of his Violin Concerto, written many years earlier, with the Tokyo Philharmonic on 1 February 1955.

In 1955 he returned to Germany for a tour conducting his own works, but it was not a success. His idiom was judged passé. On 28 February 1958 in Tokyo he was awarded the Distinguished Service Cross of the German Federal Republic's order of merit. He ceased to compose and never returned to Germany, bitter at the neglect of his music in post-war Germany.

In 1958, his opera Nana had its belated premiere in Dortmund, where it enjoyed a "modest success". It was staged in Bordeaux in 1967.

In 1969 he was awarded an honorary professorship at the Showa College of Music.

He died in Tokyo on 29 April 1972 at the age of 82.

His Soldaten was performed in Nantes in 2001.

== Works ==
=== Operas ===
- Die Heilige 'musical legend' in 3 parts after Carl Hauptmann
  27 January 1920, Bremen
- Wozzeck 'musical tragedy' in 18 scenes and one epilogue, op. 16 after Georg Büchner
  22 April 1926, Bremen
- Soldaten opera in 3 acts after Jakob Michael Reinhold Lenz
  9 November 1930, Düsseldorf
- Nana opera in 4 acts (1931/32) after Émile Zola/Max Brod
  16 April 1958, Dortmund
- Nächtlicher Spuk opera in 3 acts (1934–1936) after Paul Knudsen
- Warum? opera in a prologue, 4 acts, and sequel (1934–1936/1942–1945)
- Nordische Ballade opera in 4 acts (1934/44) after Selma Lagerlöf/Manfred Gurlitt
- Wir schreitten aus (1958)

=== Orchestral works ===
- Piano Concerto in A Major (Chamber concerto no. 1) op. 20 (1927)
- Violin Concerto in F Major (after 1934)
- Cello Concerto (after 1937-38)
- Goya Symphony (1938–39)
- Drei politische Reden for baritone, male choir and big orchestra (1946–47)
- Shakespeare Symphony (1952–54)

=== Vocal works ===
- Four Dramatic Songs for soprano and orchestra (1946–52)

=== Films ===
- The Wicked Carabel (1935)

== Recordings ==
- Wozzeck, Roland Hermann, Celina Lindsley, Anton Scharinger, Robert Wörle, Endrik Wottrich, Deutsches Symphonie-Orchester Berlin, Gerd Albrecht, Capriccio 1993.
- Wozzeck, Roland Hermann, Mari Midorikawa, Akiya Fukushima, Mitsuya Okubo, Saturo Omachi, Nikikai Chorus Group, Yomiuri Nippon Symphony Orchestra, Gerd Albrecht, Tokyo 7. 11. 2000, Yomiuri Nippon Symphony Orchestra 2000.
- Soldaten, Michael Burt, Michelle Breedt, Claudia Barainsky, Katherina Müller, Thomas Mohr, Thomas Harper, Urban Malmberg, Celina Lindsley, Robert Wörle, Rundfunkchor Berlin, Deutsches SO Berlin, Gerd Albrecht, Orfeo 1998.
- Nana, Peter Schöne, Ilia Papandreou, Dario Süß, Julia Neumann, Opernchor Erfurt, Philharmonisches Orchester Erfurt, Enrico Calesso, Crystal 2010.
- Goya-Symphonie, Christiane Oelze, Rundfunk-Sinfonieorchester Berlin, Antony Beaumont, Crystal 2007.

== Notes ==
Works cited

- The Concise Oxford Dictionary of Music Michael Kennedy, Joyce Bourne - 2004 Page 310 "Gurlitt, Manfred (b Berlin, 1890; d Tokyo, 1973). Ger. composer and conductor. Cond. at Essen 1911–12, Augsburg 1912–14, and Bremen 1914–27. His comps. were banned by the Nazis. Went to Japan 1939, forming Gurlitt Opera Co."
- The Harvard Biographical Dictionary of Music ed. Don M. Randel - 1996 Page 341 "Gurlitt, Manfred (b. Berlin, 6 Sept. 1890; d. Tokyo, 29 Apr. 1973). Composer and conductor. He studied in Berlin with Humperdinck and began his career in opera as a rehearsal pianist and coach in 1908; was assistant conductor at Bayreuth ..."
