= Nana (novel) =

1880 novel by Émile Zola

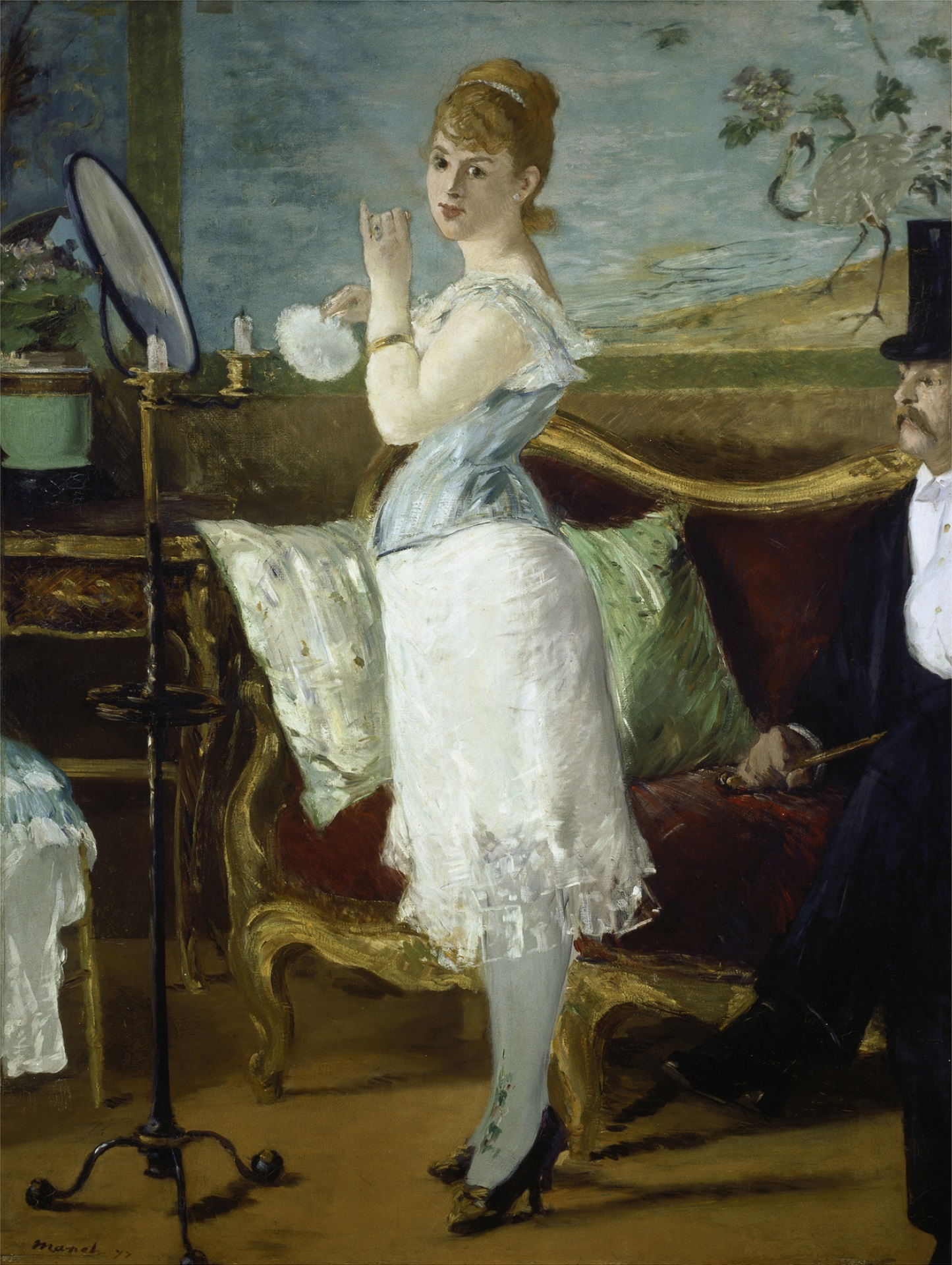
- Édouard Manet, Nana, 1877
- Author: Émile Zola
- Translator: Douglas Parmée
- Language: French
- Series: Les Rougon-Macquart
- Genre: Novel, Theatre-fiction
- Publication date: 1880
- Publication place: France
- English publication date: 1992
- Media type: Print (Serial, Hardback & Paperback)
- Pages: 432 (paperback)
- Preceded by: Germinal
- Followed by: Earth

Nana is a novel by the French naturalist author Émile Zola. Completed in 1880, Nana is the ninth installment in the 20-volume Les Rougon-Macquart series.

== Origins ==
A year before he started to write Nana, Zola knew nothing about the Théâtre des Variétés. Ludovic Halévy invited him to attend an operetta with him there on February 15, 1878, and took him backstage. Halévy told him innumerable stories about the amorous life of the star, Anna Judic, whose ménage à trois served as the model for the relationships of Rose Mignon, her husband, and Steiner in Zola's novel. Halévy also provided Zola with stories about famous prostitutes such as Blanche d'Antigny, Anna Deslions, Delphine de Lizy, and Hortense Schneider, upon which Zola drew in developing the character of his title character. Yet it was Valtesse de la Bigne, painted by both Manet and Henri Gervex, who most inspired him; it is she who is immortalised in his scandalous novel Nana.

== Synopsis ==
Nana tells the story of Anna "Nana" Coupeau's rise from streetwalker to high-class prostitute during the last three years of the French Second Empire. Nana first appeared near the end of L'Assommoir (1877), Zola's earlier novel in the Rougon-Macquart series, where she is the daughter of an abusive drunk. At the conclusion of that novel, she is living in the streets and just beginning a life of prostitution.

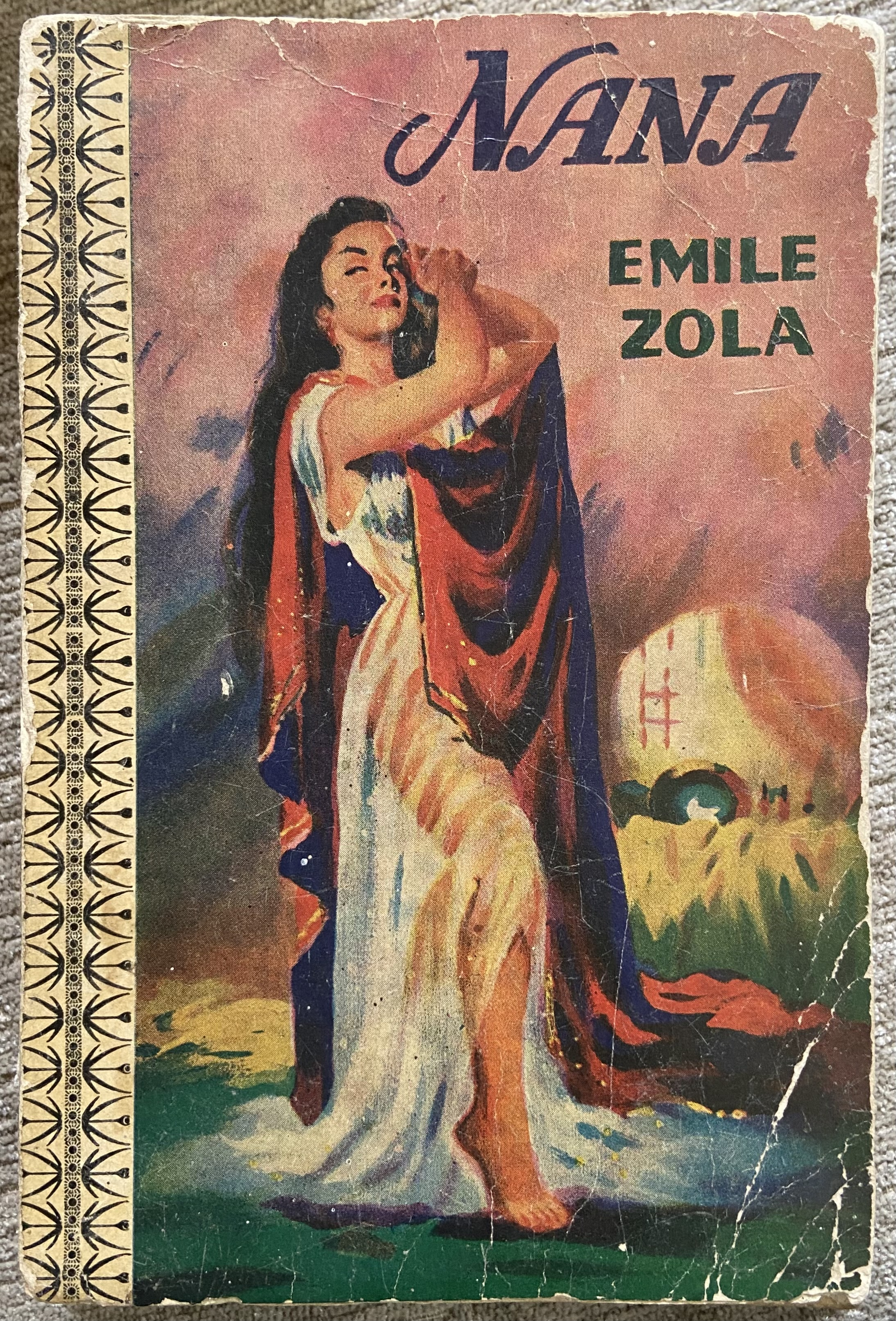
Cover page of Emile Zola's novel showing Nana, a conventionally attractive woman in a transparent dress and a red shawl in a theatrical smiling pose

Nana opens with a night at the Théâtre des Variétés in April 1867 just after the Exposition Universelle has opened. Nana is 18 years old, but she would have been 15 according to the family tree of the Rougon-Macquarts Zola had published years before starting work on this novel. Zola describes in detail the performance of La blonde Vénus, a fictional operetta modeled after Offenbach's La belle Hélène, in which Nana is cast as the lead. All of Paris is talking about her, but this is her first stage appearance. When asked to say something about her talents, Bordenave, the manager of the theatre, explains that a star does not need to know how to sing or act: "Nana has something else, dammit, and something that takes the place of everything else. I scented it out, and it smells damnably strong in her, or else I lost my sense of smell." Just as the crowd is about to dismiss her performance as terrible, young Georges Hugon shouts: "Très chic!" From then on, she owns the audience. Zola describes her appearance only thinly veiled in the third act: "All of a sudden, in the good-natured child the woman stood revealed, a disturbing woman with all the impulsive madness of her sex, opening the gates of the unknown world of desire. Nana was still smiling, but with the deadly smile of a man-eater."

In the course of the novel Nana destroys every man who pursues her: Philippe Hugon is imprisoned after stealing from the army to lend Nana money; the wealthy banker Steiner bankrupts himself trying to please her; Georges Hugon stabs himself with scissors in anguish over her; Vandeuvres incinerates himself after Nana ruins him financially; Fauchery, a journalist and publisher who falls for Nana early on, writes a scathing article about her later, and falls for her again and is ruined financially; and Count Muffat, whose faithfulness to Nana brings him back for humiliation after humiliation until he finds her in bed with his elderly father-in-law. In George Becker's words: "What emerges from [Nana] is the completeness of Nana's destructive force, brought to a culmination in the thirteenth chapter by a kind of roll call of the victims of her voracity".

Zola has Nana die a horrible death in July 1870 from smallpox. She has disappeared, her belongings have been auctioned, and no one knows where she is. It comes out that she has been living with a Russian prince, leaving her infant son in the care of an aunt near Paris, but when a smallpox epidemic breaks out she returns to nurse him; he dies, and she catches the disease. Zola suggests that her true nature, concealed by her physical beauty, has come to the surface. "What lay on the pillow was a charnel house, a heap of pus and blood, a shovelful of putrid flesh. The pustules had invaded the whole face, so that one pock touched the next". Outside her window the crowd is madly cheering "To Berlin! To Berlin!" to greet the start of the Franco-Prussian War, which will end in defeat for France and the end of the Second Empire.

== Reception ==
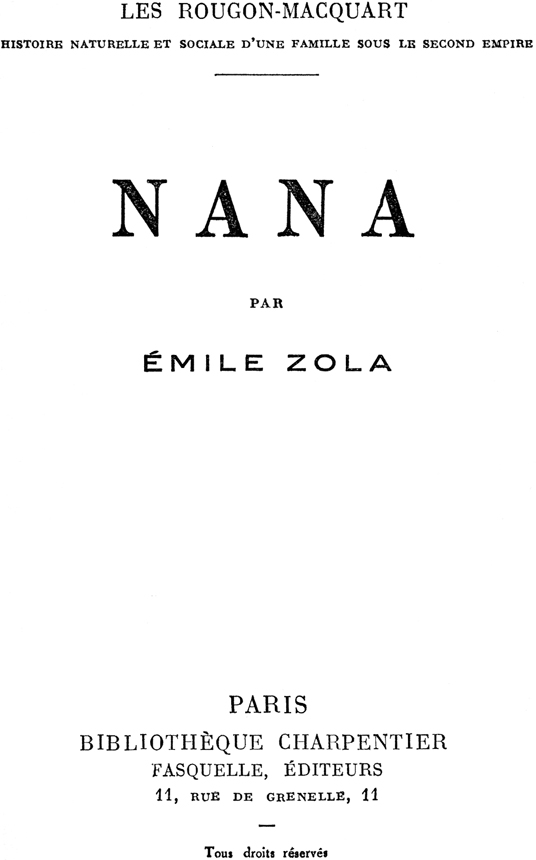
Nana Title Page of the original French Edition

The novel was an immediate success. Le Voltaire, the French newspaper that was planning to publish it in installments beginning in October 1879, launched a gigantic advertising campaign, raising the curiosity of the reading public to a fever pitch. When Charpentier finally published Nana in book form in February 1880, the first edition of 55,000 copies was sold out in one day. Flaubert and Edmond de Goncourt were full of praise for Nana. On the other hand, a part of the public and some critics reacted to the book with outrage, which may have contributed to its popularity.

Flaubert wrote Zola an effusive letter praising the novel in detail. He reported which pages he had marked by turning down their corners and praising specific passages ("everything about Fontane, perfect!"). In summation he wrote: "Nana tourne au mythe, sans cesser d'être réelle". (Nana turns into myth, without ceasing to be real.)

As a counterargument to Zola's depiction of the significance of heredity and environment, Alfred Sirven (1838-1900) and Henri Leverdier (1840- ) wrote a novel called Nana's Daughter: A Story of Parisian Life (1880). Published in both French and English versions, it told the story of Nana's daughter, who rises from "the gutter" and overcomes her background to become a respectable lady.

== Later references ==
Édouard Manet, who was much taken with the description of the "precociously immoral" Nana in Zola's L'Assommoir gave the title "Nana" to his portrait of Henriette Hauser before Nana was published. The word "nana" has become, in contemporary French, "a mildly rude French term for woman, comparable to broad". Niki de Saint Phalle called a series of her sculptures "Nanas". They were " bulbous, archetypal maternal figures like Mexican piñatas painted in bold colors and decorated with crisp, cartoon outlines". She explained that her title evoked the prototype of the female: Eve! Aphrodite! Nana de Zola! Inusable! Increvable! (Eve! Aphrodite! Zola's Nana! Everlasting! Indestructible!).

== Adaptations ==
=== Film ===
- Nana, a 1926 French film by Jean Renoir
- Nana, a 1934 American film by Dorothy Arzner and George Fitzmaurice, starring Anna Sten and Phillips Holmes
- Nana, a 1944 Mexican film by Roberto Gavaldón starring Lupe Vélez
- Nana, a 1955 French-Italian film by Christian-Jaque starring Charles Boyer and Martine Carol
- Nana, a 1958 opera (written 1931-2) by Manfred Gurlitt
- Nana, a 1968 BBC miniseries
- Nana, a 1970 French-Swedish film by Mac Ahlberg
- Nana, a 1981 French-Belgian-Swiss TV miniseries starring Véronique Genest
- Nana, the True Key of Pleasure, a 1982 Italian film by Dan Wolman
- Nana, a 1985 Mexican film by Rafael Baledón, starring Irma Serrano
- My Life to Live, directed by Jean-Luc Godard and starring Anna Karina, is based in part on Nana

=== Stage ===
- Nina; or the Story of a Heart (1885), a Romantic drama loosely adapted from Nana , written by a "Mrs. Kennion"
- Nana (1991), written by Olwen Wymark

== English Translations ==
=== Expurgated ===
1. Nana (1884, tr. unknown for H. Vizetelly, Vizetelly & Co.)
2. Nana (1926, tr. Joseph Keating, Cecil Palmer)

=== Unexpurgated ===
1. Nana (1895, tr. Victor Plarr, Lutetian Society)
2. Nana (1953, tr. Charles Duff, William Heinemann)
3. Nana (1964, tr. Lowell Blair, Bantam Books)
4. Nana (1972, tr. George Holden, Penguin Books)
5. Nana (1992, tr. Douglas Parmée, Oxford University Press)
6. Nana (2020, tr. Helen Constantine, Oxford University Press)
