= Wozzeck (Gurlitt) =

Wozzeck (op. 16) is a 1926 German-language opera in 18 scenes and one epilogue by Manfred Gurlitt after the fragmentary Woyzeck by Georg Büchner. It was premiered 22 April 1926 in Bremen, four months after the better known opera Wozzeck by Alban Berg had been premiered at the Berlin State Opera on 14 December 1925. The two composers were unaware of each other's projects, being among many artists stimulated by the publication of Büchner's play. Berg, unsettled by his publisher Universal Edition also publishing another opera on the same material so quickly, reviewed Gurlitt's piano score, and in a letter to Erich Kleiber noted Gurlitt's work's quality and originality, but found the "broth" watered down. This verdict reflects Berg's own Wagnerian influences, while Gurlitt was nearer to the aesthetics of Paul Hindemith and Kurt Weill.

== Recordings ==
- Wozzeck, Roland Hermann, Celina Lindsley, Anton Scharinger, Robert Wörle, Endrik Wottrich, Deutsches Symphonie-Orchester Berlin, Gerd Albrecht, Capriccio 1993.
- Wozzeck, Roland Hermann, Mari Midorikawa, Akiya Fukushima, Mitsuya Okubo, Saturo Omachi, Nikikai Chorus Group, Yomiuri Nippon Symphony Orchestra, Gerd Albrecht, Tokyo 7. 11. 2000, Yomiuri Nippon Symphony Orchestra 2000. Octavia Records
