= Oedipus der Tyrann =

1959 opera by Carl Orff

- Opera by Carl Orff
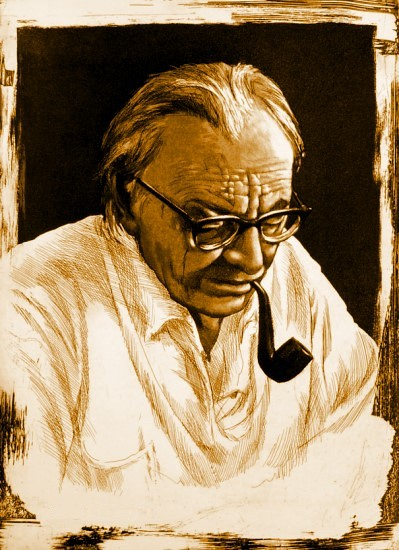
- The composer, aquatint etching
- Language: German
- Based on: Friedrich Hölderlin's translation of Oedipus Rex by Sophocles
- Premiere: 11 December 1959; Stuttgart Opera House

Oedipus der Tyrann (Oedipus the Tyrant ) is Carl Orff's musical setting of the drama Oedipus Tyrannos (Ancient Greek: Οἰδίπους Τύραννος) in a prologue and five acts by Sophocles in the German translation by Friedrich Hölderlin (1804). As a direct musical setting of the complete dramatic text in Hölderlin's translation, Orff's score is a prime example of a Literaturoper ("literary opera"). It premiered on 11 December 1959 at the Stuttgart Opera House, conducted by Ferdinand Leitner and directed by Günther Rennert, with set and costume design by Caspar Neher.

== Roles ==
- Oedipus (tenor)
- Jocasta (soprano)
- Creon, King of Thebes (baritone)
- Tiresias, the seer (tenor)
- A priest (tenor)
- A messenger from Corinth (bass)
- A Messenger of Lajos (bass)
- Another Messenger (bass)
- 1st Chorus Leader
- 2nd Chorus Leader
- The Theban Elders (Chorus)

== Plot ==
Oedipus, King of Thebes, sends his brother-in-law, Creon, to ask the advice of the oracle at Delphi, concerning a plague ravaging Thebes. Creon returns to report that the plague is the result of religious pollution, since the murderer of their former king, Laius, has never been caught. Oedipus vows to find the murderer and curses him for causing the plague.

Oedipus summons the blind prophet Tiresias for help. Tiresias admits to knowing the answers to Oedipus's questions, but he refuses to speak, instead telling Oedipus to abandon his search. Angered by the seer's reply, Oedipus accuses him of complicity in Laius's murder. The offended Tiresias then reveals to the king that "you yourself are the criminal you seek". Oedipus does not understand how this could be, and supposes that Creon must have paid Tiresias to accuse him. The two argue vehemently, as Oedipus mocks Tiresias's lack of sight, and Tiresias retorts that Oedipus himself is blind. Eventually, the prophet leaves, muttering darkly that when the murderer is discovered, he shall be a native of Thebes, brother and father to his own children, and son and husband to his own mother.

Creon arrives to face Oedipus's accusations. The King demands that Creon be executed; however, the chorus persuades him to let Creon live. Jocasta, wife of first Laius and then Oedipus, enters and attempts to comfort Oedipus, telling him he should take no notice of prophets. As proof, she recounts an incident in which she and Laius received an oracle which never came true. The prophecy stated that Laius would be killed by his own son; instead, Laius was killed by bandits, at a fork in the road (τριπλαῖς ἁμαξιτοῖς, triplais amaxitois).

The mention of the place causes Oedipus to pause and ask for more details. Jocasta specifies the branch to Daulis on the way to Delphi. Recalling Tiresias's words, he asks Jocasta to describe Laius. The king then sends for a shepherd, the only surviving witness of the attack, to be brought from his fields to the palace.

Confused, Jocasta asks Oedipus what the matter is, and he tells her. Many years ago, at a banquet in Corinth, a man drunkenly accused Oedipus of not being his father's son. Oedipus went to Delphi and asked the oracle about his parentage. Instead of answering his question directly, the oracle prophesied that he would one day murder his father and sleep with his mother. Upon hearing this, Oedipus resolved never to return to Corinth. In his travels, he came to the very crossroads where Laius had been killed, and encountered a carriage that attempted to drive him off the road. An argument ensued, and Oedipus killed the travelers—including a man who matched Jocasta's description of Laius. However, Oedipus holds out hope that he was not Laius's killer, because Laius was said to have been murdered by several robbers. If the shepherd confirms that Laius was attacked by many men, then Oedipus will be in the clear.

A man arrives from Corinth with the message that Polybus, who raised Oedipus as his son, has died. To the surprise of the messenger, Oedipus is overjoyed, because he can no longer kill his father, thus disproving half of the oracle's prophecy. However, he still fears that he might somehow commit incest with his mother. Eager to set the king's mind at ease, the messenger tells him not to worry, because Merope is not his real mother.

The messenger explains that years earlier, while tending his flock on Mount Cithaeron, a shepherd from the household of Laius brought him an infant that he was instructed to dispose of. The messenger had then given the child to Polybus, who raised him. Oedipus asks the chorus if anyone knows the identity of the other shepherd, or where he might be now. They respond that he is the same shepherd who witnessed the murder of Laius, and whom Oedipus had already sent for. Jocasta, realizing the truth, desperately begs Oedipus to stop asking questions. When Oedipus refuses, the queen runs into the palace.

When the shepherd arrives, Oedipus questions him, but he begs to be allowed to leave without answering further. However, Oedipus presses him, finally threatening him with torture or execution. It emerges that the child he gave away was Laius's own son. In fear of a prophecy that the child would kill his father, Jocasta gave her son to the shepherd in order to be exposed upon the mountainside.

Everything is at last revealed, and Oedipus curses himself and fate before leaving the stage. The chorus laments how even a great man can be felled by fate, and following this, a servant exits the palace to speak of what has happened inside. Jocasta has hanged herself in her bedchamber. Entering the palace in anguish, Oedipus called on his servants to bring him a sword, that he might slay Jocasta with his own hand. But upon discovering the lifeless queen, Oedipus takes her down and removes the long gold pins from her dress. He then gouges out his own eyes in despair.

The blinded king now exits the palace, and begs to be exiled. Creon enters, saying that Oedipus shall be taken into the house until oracles can be consulted regarding what is best to be done. Oedipus's two daughters (and half-sisters), Antigone and Ismene, are sent out and Oedipus laments their having been born to such a cursed family. He begs Creon to watch over them, in hopes that they will live where there is opportunity for them, and to have a better life than their father. Creon agrees, before sending Oedipus back into the palace.

On an empty stage, the chorus repeats the common Greek maxim that "no man should be considered fortunate until he is dead."

== Music ==
=== Orchestra ===
Like the score of Orff's Antigonae (Salzburg 1949), the score of Oedipus the Tyrant calls for an orchestral instrumentation unique in music history:

- 6 concert grand pianos with 10 players
- 4 harps
- 1 mandoline
- 1 celesta
- 1 glass harp
- 9 double basses
- 6 flutes, all also piccolos, 2 alto flutes
- 6 oboen
- 6 trombones
- 1 Organon

The large percussion section requires ten to fifteen players:

- 5–6 timpani
- 1 lithophone
- 2 xylophones
- 5–6 tenor xylophones (xylophones of the Orff-Schulwerk)
- 2 bass xylophones
- 5 wood drums of various size
- 1 guiro
- 2 bongos
- 2 timbales
- 1 large tom-tom
- 3 congas
- 2 bass drums
- 3 tambourines
- castanets
- 1 triangel
- 1 sistrum
- 3 pairs of Turkish cymbals
- 3 * 3 suspended Turkish cymbals
- antique cymbals
- tubular bells
- 3 glockenspiels, including 1 keyboard glockenspiel
- 1 metallophone
- 3–5 tamtams of various size
- 2 javanese gongs in C and c

instruments behind the stage:

- 8 trumpets
- several large tam-tams struck with cymbals

Trough xylophones are instruments of the Orff Schulwerk. Since they are uncommon in orchestral use due to the chromatic arrangement of the bars, but are the only instruments capable of performing chromatic glissandi, most of the low-pitched trough xylophones are replaced by marimbas in current performance practice. While the performance of the percussion parts placed considerable demands on the percussionists at the time of the premiere, Orff's score no longer presents insurmountable obstacles thanks to the extraordinary development of percussion technique in recent decades.

=== Musical language ===
Orff's faithful setting of Friedrich Hölderlin's 1804 translations of Sophocles marked the creation of a new form of music theater, in which the text itself is musicalized through the declamation of the vocal parts. An extraordinary reduction of the pitch structure, combined with the predominance of rhythm, constitutes the essential characteristics of Orff's late style. In contrast to the large choruses of the Antigonae score, which employ the often unison chorus over a foundation of extensive rhythmic textures, the composer entrusted extended passages of text to the solo speaking voices of individual chorus leaders in the score of Oedipus the Tyrant. This unnotated use of the speaking voice was something the composer would later abandon in the sections spoken in Ancient Greek in his score of Prometheus (Stuttgart 1968).

In contrast to the large choruses of the Antigonae score, which often employ the chorus singing in unison over the foundation of extensive rhythmic soundscapes, the composer entrusted extended passages of text to the solo speaking voices of individual chorus leaders in the score of Oedipus the Tyrant. Orff's abandonment of the grammar of harmonic tonality allowed the composer to make the declamatory voice itself the vehicle of the action, as a musical equivalent to Hölderlin's archaic language. As Pietro Massa has shown, the creative process of Orff's ancient Greek operas was accompanied by an intensive exchange of ideas with the classical philologist Wolfgang Schadewaldt, the musicologist Thrasybulos Georgiades, and Wieland Wagner, the director of the premiere originally desired by the composer.

The focus on an ensemble of percussion instruments with definite and indefinite pitch, originally certainly Born from the fascination that the only remaining group within the orchestra capable of further development held for 20th-century composers, Orff's orchestration appears simultaneously as a veritable panacea for a composer for whom the creation of pitch organization had never been a central concern. The concept of a differentiated, division-of-labor collaboration, which characterized the orchestra of Western art music as it had organically grown over the centuries, appears transposed in the orchestra of Orff's operas to instrumental constellations previously unknown in European art music. Six grand pianos and several xylophones, usually relegated to rather marginal roles in the traditional orchestra, assume within the score of Oedipus the Tyrant roughly the role that fell to the string section in the orchestral writing of the Viennese Classical period.

== Recordings ==
=== Audio ===
- Gerhard Stolze, Astrid Varnay, Hans Baur, Fritz Wunderlich, Willy Domgraf-Fassbaender, Hubert Buchta, Hans Günter Nöcker; Orchester und Chor der Württembergischen Staatsoper Stuttgart, Musikalische Leitung: Ferdinand Leitner. Uraufführung 1959.
- Helmut Melchert, Martha Mödl, Gerd Feldhoff, Hans-Herbert Fliether, Horst Günter, Paul Kuen, Wendelin Starcke-Bauer, Willy Witte, Bernd Werner, Rudolf Möller; NDR Chor / Vokalensemble, NDR Sinfonie-Orchester, Musikalische Leitung: Winfried Zillig. Norddeutscher Rundfunk 1961.
- Gerhard Stolze, Astrid Varnay, Kieth Engen, James Harper, Karl Christian Kohn, Hubert Buchta, Hans Günter Nöcker, Rolf Boysen, Heinz Cramer, Carlos Alexander; Symphonieorchester des Bayerischen Rundfunks, Musikalische Leitung: Rafael Kubelík. Deutsche Grammophon 1966.

=== Video ===
- A performance at Staatstheater Darmstadt was released by Wergo in 2010, directed by Peider A. Defilla. It featued Norbert Schmittberg, Dimitry Ivashchenko, Andreas Daum, Oleksandr Prytolyuk, Markus Durst, Mark Adler, Yamina Maamar, Stefan Umhey, and Hans-Joachim Porcher. The stage director was John Dew. The conductor was Stefan Blunier.
