= Winterspelt (film) =

- Directed by: Eberhard Fechner
- Written by: Alfred Andersch; Eberhard Fechner
- Starring: Ulrich von Dobschütz; Hans Christian Blech; George Sewell
- Distributed by: Hessischer Rundfunk
- Release date: 3 March 1978
- Running time: 110 minutes
- Country: Germany
- Language: German

Winterspelt is a 1978 West German war film directed by Eberhard Fechner and starring Ulrich von Dobschütz, Hans Christian Blech, George Sewell, Garrick Hagon, David Healy, George Roubicek, Frederick Jaeger, Katharina Thalbach and Henning Schlüter. It is set during the Second World War. It was also released as Winterspelt 1944.

== Plot ==
The film is set in September 1944, when a German Wehrmacht officer tries to surrender his unit, stationed in the German village of Winterspelt, to nearby American forces.
