= Der neue Menoza =

1773 comedy by Jakob Michael Reinhold Lenz

The new Menoza
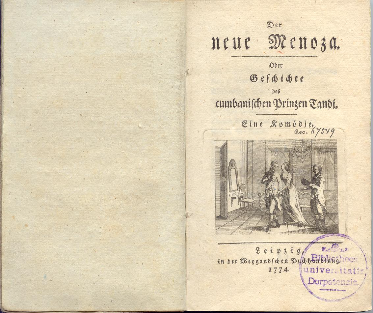
- Title page of the first edition
- Original title: Der neue Menoza
- Written by: Jakob Michael Reinhold Lenz
- Original language: German
- Genre: Comedy
- Setting: Naumburg, also Dresden and Leipzig

The New Menoza or a History of the Cumban Prinz Tandi (German: Der neue Menoza oder eine Geschichte des cumbanischen Prinzen Tandi) is a 1773 comedy by Jakob Michael Reinhold Lenz, first published in Leipzig in 1774. Johann Wolfgang von Goethe arranged for the play's publishing.

== Title ==
The title of the play is a reference to Danish author Erik Pontoppidan's 1754 novel Menoza, an Asian prince who travelled throughout the world looking for Christians.

== Plot ==
Captain von Biederling has a new friend visiting his home in Naumburg - Count Camäleon. (the Count's name is similar to the German word for chameleon. The two want to invest in an "economic project" for the captain's benefit. The Count is not a comfortable guest; he is on the run after shooting another Count and is currently hiding with the Biederlings. A Kalmyk prince called Tandi, who is travelling through town as part of a European tour, makes a stop at Naumburg. When he captain announces to his wife that he is also expecting his old friend von Zopf from Trieste (Italy) to visit, Mrs von Biederling rebels. Von Zopf, who caused the death of her son, is most unwelcome to her. Mr von Biederling, an authoritarian and grumpy officer, does not accept his rebellious wife's objections during the heated quarrel which ensues.

Wilhelmine, the daughter of the house, suddenly has two suitors seeking her hand in marriage - the Count and the Prince. She does not know which one to choose; both are "rich and handsome". The von Biederlings decide to let their daughter make her own decision. Wihelmine wavers. At first she wants to remain single, but then she confesses her love to the Prince, and the young couple faints with happiness. The Count, however, does not give in, and still wants to marry the girl. For this reason he fights with the captain.

Wilhelmine and Prince Tandi get married. Von Zopf, who has just arrived, tells the Prince that he is in fact the son of the Biederlings and thus Wilhelmine's brother. The Prince faints again. Von Zopf had once taken the Biederling's son with him on a trip to Smyrna, an Ancient Greek city (located in present-day Turkey), from which the son never returned.

At the same time, the Count is involved in a bitter intrigue; Donna Diana, a Spanish Countess staying in Dresden with her faithful nurse Babet, has been following the hair-raising events in Naumberg. As the Count's "lawfully wedded" wife, Diana must now fear being poisoned at the instigation of her marriage sponsor - whilst Dian was in Spain she had been seduced by Camäleon. The seduced women then steals from her parents and poisons her own father "to please" the count.

The Prince goes to Leipzig, leaving Wilhelmine behind in Naumberg. She still loves him. Mrs von Biederling, on the other hand, calls the fugitive a monster. Her only son leaves without seeing his mother. Mrs von Biederling persuades her daughter to hate her husband so that she can forget him.

Babet, who in the meantime has arrived at the Biederlings with her mistress Donna Diana. She tells Wilhelmine that she switched the babies of Diana and Wilhelmine; Wilhelmine is the daughter of a Spanish count, a certain Aranda Velas. The switch happened in Dresden. Count Aranda Velas was staying there at the time with his family whilst employed in diplomatic services at the court. Mrs von Biederling travelled after her husband, the captain, to the Silesian war front and left her newborn in Dresden. When the Biederlings returned, they were given the wrong baby - an ill one. The Velas family kept the healthy (Biederling) child.

Thus Wilhelmine and the Prince are not siblings, and the Prince and Donna are brother and sister.

At the end of the play, Diana attempts to murder her husband, the faithless Count. The Count pulls out the knife from his wound and says aloud "I have been murdered". He is bandaged up.

There is a happy end for Wilhelmine and the Prince.

== Bibliography ==
- Jakob Michael Reinhold Lenz (1774), Der neue Menoza. Oder Geschichte des cumbanischen Prinzen Tandi (in German), Leipzig: Weygandsche Buchhandlung
- Jakob Michael Reinhold Lenz (1965), Der neue Menoza: eine Komödie: Text und Materialien zur Interpretation besorgt von Walter Hinck, Komedia. Deutsche Lustspiele vom Barock bis zur Gegenwart 9 (in German), Walter de Gruyter: Berlin, OCLC 1017801009
