= Prometheus (Orff) =

- Opera by Carl Orff
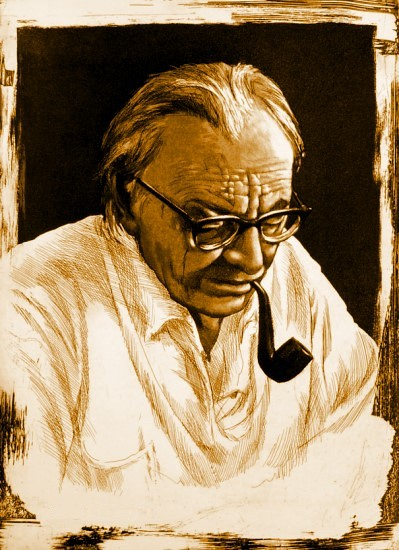
- The composer, aquatint etching
- Librettist: Aeschylus
- Language: Ancient Greek
- Based on: Prometheus Bound
- Premiere: 24 March 1968; Staatstheater Stuttgart

Prometheus is an opera by Carl Orff. The opera's Greek text is based on the drama (Greek: Προμηθεὺς Δεσμώτης – Promētheús desmṓtēs – Prometheus Bound) by Aeschylus, the only surviving part of his Prometheus trilogy. Since Aeschylus's text in Ancient Greek has been directly set to music without alterations or cuts, Orff's score qualifies as one of the most typical examples for the operatic genre of Literaturoper. The premiere took place on March 24, 1968, at Staatstheater Stuttgart under the direction of Ferdinand Leitner in a production by Rudolf Sellner with sets and costumes by Teo Otto.

== Roles ==
Roles, voice types, and premiere cast
Greek name	Transliteration	Voice type	Premiere cast, 24 March 1968 Conductor: Ferdinand Leitner
Προμηθεύς,	Prometheus	baritone	Carlos Alexander
Κράτος	Kratos	bass	Toni Blankenheim
Βία	Bia	silent role	
Ἥφαιστος	Hephaistos	baritone	Heinz Cramer
Ὠκεανός,	Okeanos	bass	Kieth Engen
Ἰὼ Ἰνάχου,	Io Inachis	soprano	Althea Bridges
Ἑρμῆς,	Hermes	baritone	Willy Ferenz
Ὠκεανίδα	First Okeanide	soprano	Althea Bridges
Ὠκεανίδα	Second Okeanide	mezzo-soprano	?
Ὠκεανίδα	Third Okeanide	contralto	Ursula Sutter
Χόρος Ὠκεανίδων	Choros Okeanidon	Women's chorus	Opera Chorus Stuttgart

== Synopsis ==
The titan Prometheus, who has been placed in Scythian iron chains because of his alleged fire robbery, does not want to reveal to the Olympic ruler Zeus a secret knowledge that he claims to possess. Hermes asks Prometheus one last time to finally name the hetaerae who would cost Zeus and his followers their eternal rule. When Prometheus refuses, he is struck by lightning and thunder from an earthquake which throws him into the shadowy realm of the Hades.

Kratos (Greek: "Power") and Bia (Greek: "Violence"), the servants of Zeus, drag Prometheus to the Caucasus mountains, where, at Zeus' command, the reluctant Hephaistos chains Prometheus to a rock of the Caucasus. Hephaistos takes pity on Prometheus, but is also afraid of Zeus and his accomplices.

After Hephaistos, Kratos and Bia have left, the chorus of the daughters of Okeanos appears; they assures him of his friendship and inquire about the reason for this punishment. Prometheus tells about his fight against Kronos, helping Zeus to overthrow his father through cunning and cleverness. Zeus then passed the offices, but did not think of the humans, so that only Prometheus came to their support; he gave them the fire, hope and the art of prophecy. The chorus warns him of his audacity, whereupon Prometheus declares that despite his knowledge of his future punishment, he did it for the sake of people.

The chorus flies away, whereupon Okeanos rides on stage on his griffin. He describes himself as the greatest friend of Prometheus and claims that he hurried to his side as quickly as possible. But Prometheus asks him if he wants to indulge in his suffering and is outraged again about Zeus. Okeanos also warns him about the lack of submission to the new ruler. Prometheus should submit and ask for mercy so that he would be redeemed. But he reacts with irony to this advice from Okeanos, who had not supported the people with him. Okeanos offers to appeal to Zeus, but Prometheus advises him against it, referring to his brothers Atlas and Typhon. Okeanos is persuaded and flies away.

The chorus returns and laments Prometheus's deplorable fate. Thereupon Prometheus tells what knowledge he brought to the human race, including medicine, seafaring, meteorology and divination. He also announces that Zeus will abdicate one day and Prometheus will be redeemed. The Okeanids, though, should not tell Zeus about his future so that his prophecy will come true. The chorus laments the suffering of Prometheus and the lack of help from the human race which had enjoyed Prometheus's support.

The horned Io, daughter of Inachos, enters on stage. Prometheus announces the end of Zeus's reign to her by a son of Hera. When Io learns that Prometheus has mastered the art of divination, she wants him to predict her own fate. Before that, however, she reports how she dreamed of Zeus's love. Therefore, Inachos, the father of Io, received the news from an oracle and decided to expel his daughter from the country. To cover up the love for Io, he turned her into a cow. But this was not hidden from Hera; she sent Argos as a guard and had the cow chased by a gadfly. Now Prometheus announces Io's future: She will cross the Bosphorus (which will be named after her) and will eventually reach Ethiopia following the Nile Delta to Canopus to give birth to Epaphos there. A descendant of the Io's in the 13th generation, a "hero of the bow" (i.e. Herakles) will one day save Prometheus. Since Io can no longer bear the stings of the gadfly, she escapes.

Prometheus reveals to the chorus of the Okeanids that Zeus' curse will come to an end. Hermes comes in and demands that Prometheus open up to Zeus who will overthrow him. He threatens with lightning and storm, which would hurt Prometheus badly; an eagle sent by Zeus would come to eat Prometheus's liver. Since Prometheus refuses to disclose this knowledge, he is punished by Zeus: the rock with the titan forged onto it sinks into Hades.

== Music ==
=== Orchestra ===
The score of Orff's Prometheus calls for an instrumentation that is unique in music history:

- 6 flutes, all also piccolos, 1 also alto flute
- 6 oboes, oboes 5–6 also cor anglais
- 6 trumpets
- 6 trombones
- 4 harps
- 4 tenor banjos
- 1 organ
- 1 regal
- 1 electric organ
- 4 grand pianos with 8 players
- 9 double basses

The large percussion section requires 15 to 18 players:

- 5 timpani
- 2 small timpani with wooden cover
- 1 snare drum with resonant strings
- 3 Basque drums
- 2 bass drums, 1 with a cymbal attached
- 1 O-Daiko
- 1 taiko
- 4 darabukkas
- 2 congas
- 1 lithophone
- 2 xylophones
- 2 chromatic tenor xylophones
- 2 marimbaphones
- 1 bass xylophone
- 1 glockenspiel
- 1 metallophone
- 1 bass metallophone
- 6 tubular bells
- 1 triangle
- 1 pair of cymbals
- 3 hanging cymbals (small – medium – large)
- 5 hanging Turkish cymbals
- 3 hanging Chinese cymbals
- 2 cymbales antiques
- 1 pair of small cymbales antiques (c^{5})
- 6 pairs antique cymbals
- 3 tamtam
- 3 gongs
- 2 large metal plates (e^{3} and f^{3})
- 1 plate bell (contra-C_{1})
- 1 güiro
- 5 wood blocks
- 3 wood bells
- 1 large wood bell
- 1 African slot drum
- 3 wooden planks
- 1 pair of bamboo tubes
- 2 pairs of hyōshigi
- 1 wasamba
- 1 binzasara
- 4 maracas
- 2 angklung (g^{1} and b flat^{1})
- 7 glasses (tuned)
- 1 wind machine
- 1 thunder machine

The chromatic tenor xylophones are instruments of the Orff-Schulwerk. Since they are not normally used in the percussion section of the symphony orchestra because of the chromatic arrangement of their keys, in current performance practice marimbaphones are substituted. However, since chromatic glissandi can only be performed on chromatic tenor xylophones, these instruments from Orff's Schulwerk are included in limited numbers in order to allow for the performance of chromatic glissandi. The score of Prometheus therefore reflects the performance practice of all three of Orff's operas on subjects from Greek Antiquity.

While at the time of the premiere, the performance of the percussion section required considerable skills from the percussionists, thanks to the extraordinary development of the percussion technology in the past decades, Orff's score no longer offers insurmountable obstacles.

=== Musical language ===
As Pietro Massa was able to show, an intensive exchange of ideas with the classical philologist Wolfgang Schadewaldt, the musicologist Thrasybulos Georgiades and with Wieland Wagner, the director who had originally been selected by the composer for the staging of the world premiere, accompanied the genesis of Orff's operas on subjects from Greek Antiquity. Orff made the decision, revolutionary for the time when the work was created, to set the original Greek text after extensive consultation with Wolfgang Schadewaldt, who advised the composer on detailed questions of Greek metrics. Since the quantitative metrics of Ancient Greek poetry are incompatible with the accent metrics of modern European languages as well as with the metrical structure of European art music, the composer chose the solution not to let the text, which had to be declaimed rhythmically by the singer's speaking voice during long passages of the opera, be decanted in a rhythm that corresponded to the ancient Greek meter of the original, but to add to the syllable order of the ancient Greek text the second layer of an autonomous musical rhythm. Since vast parts of the score require a rhythmic declamation of the Greek text in the speaking voice of the soloists, which is only occasionally interrupted by strong accents of the gigantic percussion, the score of Prometheus also marked a new stage in Orff's departure from traditional pitch structures in comparison with his previous operas on Greek dramas.

Concentrating on an ensemble of percussion instruments with a specific and indefinite pitch, originally certainly born out of the fascination that the orchestra's only still evolving group exercised on 20th-century composers, appeared to be a veritable patent solution for a composer for whom the creation of purely diastematic organizations had never been a central concern. The idea of a differentiated cooperation based on the division of labor, which has distinguished the orchestra of Western art music that has grown organically over the centuries, in the orchestra of Orff's operas on Greek Antiquity appears transposed onto instrument constellations that were previously unknown to European art music. In the score of Prometheus, the four pianos and the xylophones, which in the traditional orchestra were only given marginal tasks, take on the role that the string body had in the orchestration of Viennese classical music. On the other hand, the basic instruments of the traditional European symphony orchestra – such as flutes, oboes, trumpets and double basses – become entrusted in Orff's scores with functions that had been the realm of the rare percussion instruments in the 19th-century orchestra tradition. Their special timbres, which possess an almost exotic sound appeal, are only used for special, dramaturgically motivated tasks.

The inclusion of numerous non-European percussion instruments that had not previously been used in the orchestra of European art music cannot be interpreted as musical exoticism, especially since the composer hardly uses the new timbres unmixed. Rather, the gathering of instruments from all parts of the world in the orchestra of Orff's last works for the stage serves to substantiate the claim that the setting of the ancient Greek myth should reveal the all-encompassing nature of the Greek myth which appeals to mankind in its entirety.

In the history of 20th-century music, Orff's operas on subjects from Greek Antiquity appear as an extraordinarily original development of musical dramaturgy after 1949. In recent decades, and especially after the year 2000, Orff's late style has attracted an increasing interest from opera houses and from musicological research alike, not least because of the obvious relationship between Orff's musical language and the tendencies of minimalism.

== Performance history ==
Only five months after the opera's world premiere, on 1 August 1968, Orff's Prometheus received a second, highly successful production at the Bavarian State Opera Munich, conducted by Michael Gielen and staged by August Everding with the sets and costumes designed by Josef Svoboda; this production has received the composer's special praise. After the great success of these initial performances, the enormous difficulties of the title role, the problem of assembling a large collection of exotic percussion instruments and the reluctance of smaller opera houses to stage a work written in Ancient Greek have hindered a broader diffusion of Orff's score, although some basic notions of Ancient Greek would have been present at least among some members of an educated opera audience in Western Germany. After the year 2000, a renewed interest in Carl Orff's late style has led to a rediscovery of his operas on subjects from Greek Antiquity; in the meantime, opera scores with a libretto in rare or non-Western languages had become increasingly common. Among the productions of the last decade, a production in the context of the festival Ruhrtriennale (Duisburg 2012), conducted by Peter Rundel and with the staging, sets and costumes by the Samoan director Lemi Ponifasio, has met with special success. Further performances in concert were presented in 2013 (Munich), in 2015 in the context of the Orff festival in Diessen/Ammersee, and again 2015 in Munich. A new production of Prometheus had been announced for the summer of 2020; the opera should have been staged in the context of the Jugendfestspiele Bayreuth, a branch of Bayreuth Festival.

== Recordings ==
- Roland Hermann, Colette Lorand, Fritz Uhl, Heinz Cramer, Josef Greindl, Kieth Engen; Rundfunk-Symphonieorchester Köln, conductor: Ferdinand Leitner. 1972. Arts Archives.
- Roland Hermann, Colette Lorand, Fritz Uhl, Heinz Cramer, Josef Greindl, Kieth Engen; Symphonieorchester des Bayerischen Rundfunks, conductor: Rafael Kubelík. Orfeo 1975.
