= Nana (opera) =

Nana is a German-language opera by Manfred Gurlitt to a libretto by Max Brod based on the novel Nana by Emile Zola. The opera was written 1931-1932, and due to be premiered in 1933, but cancelled because of Gurlitt's known opposition to the Nazi regime. It was not staged until 1958 in Dortmund, when the composer had long been in exile in Japan.

== Recordings ==
- Peter Schöne, Ilia Papandreou, Dario Süß, Julia Neumann, Opernchor Erfurt, Philharmonisches Orchester Erfurt, Enrico Calesso
