= The Tutor (Brecht) =

German play

The Tutor is the 1950 adaptation, by 20th-century German dramatist Bertolt Brecht, of the 18th-century play The Tutor by Jakob Michael Reinhold Lenz. The original Lenz play was produced in 1774 and is also known by the title "The Advantages of a Private Education". Brecht contributed few additions to the plot of the original work, but made many cuts and alterations. Brecht's work is two-thirds the length of the original play and over half the material is new. The play was Brecht's first production which featured work from the German Classical Era for the Berliner Ensemble. Overall, it was the third production the Berliner Ensemble performed. Brecht himself directed this production. 'The Tutor' was translated by Ralph Manheim and Wolfgang Sauerlander.

== Plot ==
Lauffer is a tutor who earns a meagre living teaching a retired major's two children. When he tries to negotiate his salary it is cut by his masters. The major's daughter and Lauffer's student, Gussie, seduces Lauffer and becomes pregnant by him. Pursued by the major and his friends, Lauffer runs away and takes refuge with a village schoolmaster, Wenceslas. There he becomes attracted to the schoolmaster's ward and, to prevent repetition of the previous disaster, castrates himself. He then finds that he is acceptable to all, and eventually marries the girl. Lauffer is then acclaimed as the perfect teacher and entrusted with the education of Germany's youth.

== Historical context ==
Post World War II, Germany was split in four zones by the Allied powers. By 1949, these zones had essentially become an "eastern" and "western" block. The Federal Republic of Germany was founded in the west with the promulgation of the basic law on 23 May 1949. The German Democratic Republic (GDR) was founded in the "eastern zone" on 7 October 1949. In 1950, the German Democratic Republic was finding its new direction as a socialist state. In this defining time, Germans were hopeful of disassociating themselves from the horrors of Nazism and World War II. As a lesson to the German people, Brecht adapted a play from its past, Lenz's 'The Tutor', to serve as a pointed warning and reminder of the nation's history. Lenz wrote 'The Tutor' prior to the French Revolution in 1789, which changed not only the social structure of Europe, but also Germany. This parallels the social changes faced by Germany post World War II, especially in the eastern block which had adopted socialism. Brecht's play drew upon the themes of subverting class in the original to remind the German people that they had control of their future and that they did not need to subject themselves to a ruling class. Brecht was specifically targeting the German intellectuals and their habit of "intellectual servitude" to the higher classes. In the play, Lauffer's self-castration was representative of the moral collapse of German intellectuals and educators during the Nazi era. Brecht aimed to portray this as negative in order to prevent the cycle of blind servitude from beginning again.

== Characters ==
- Hasty, a tutor
- Pastor Hasty, his father
- Privy Councillor Von Berg
- Fritz, his son
- Major Von Berg
- Mrs. Von Berg, his wife
- Gussie, their daughter
- Leopold, their son
- The Von Bergs' Maid
- Wenceslas, a village schoolmaster
- Lisa, his ward
- Count Vermouth
- Squint and Buttress, students
- Mrs. Blitz, a landlady
- Miss Swandown
- Caroline Squint
- Miss Cotton
- Miss Miller
- Miss Gosling
