= Anton Scharinger =

Austrian operatic bass-baritone

Anton Scharinger (born 5 March 1961 in Straning-Grafenberg Lower Austria) is an Austrian operatic bass-baritone and academic teacher at the University of Music and Performing Arts Vienna.

== Life ==
Scharinger first studied with Margarita Heppe in Vienna and graduated from the Musik und Kunst Privatuniversität der Stadt Wien in 1984. As a student, he already distinguished himself as a concert singer. In 1981, he joined the Salzburger Landestheater, where he made his operatic debut as Guglielmo in Così fan tutte.

His international career began with further Mozart roles, Papageno, Figaro (conductor: Nikolaus Harnoncourt) and Leporello in Don Giovanni. He also expanded his repertoire with roles in unknown works, such as the Captain in Manfred Gurlitt's Wozzeck and Count Robinson in Il matrimonio segreto.

As a concert soloist, he has performed among others under Riccardo Chailly, William Christie, Christoph von Dohnányi, Antal Doráti, Bernard Haitink, Harnoncourt, Nello Santi and Sir Georg Solti.

Scharinger can be heard in numerous sound and video recordings.

== Recordings ==
- Die Zauberflöte (Papageno)
- Le Nozze di Figaro (Figaro)
- Don Giovanni (Masetto)
- Die Fledermaus (Dr. Falke)
- Sacred works by J. S. Bach, Georg Friedrich Handel, Joseph Haydn and Franz Schubert.

== Awards and prizes ==
- Österreichisches Ehrenkreuz für Bildung und Kunst
- 1995: Mozartinterpretationspreis
