= The Soldiers (play) =

1776 play by JMR Lenz

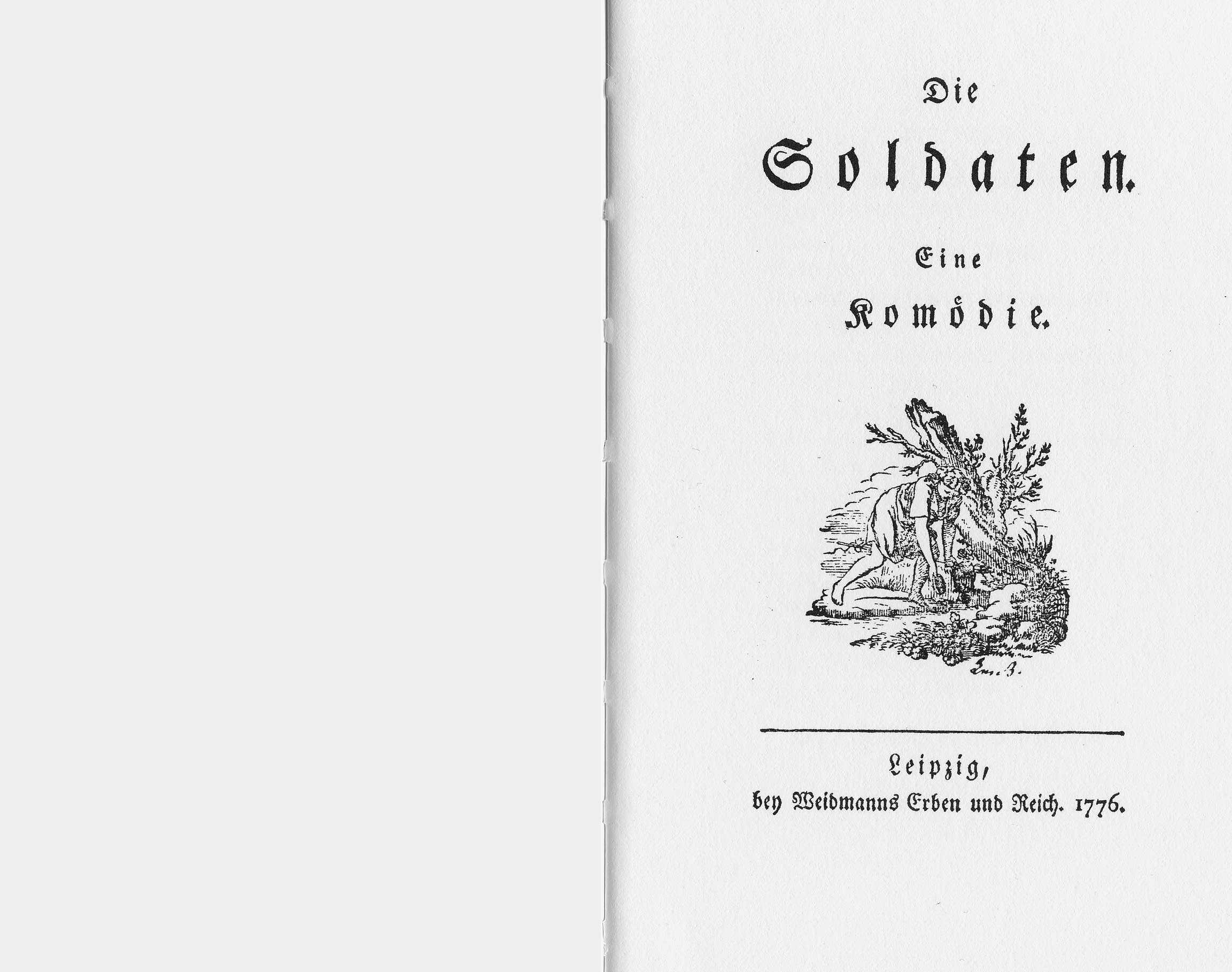
- Title page of the first edition, 1776
- Original title: Die Soldaten
- Original language: German
- Written by: Jakob Michael Reinhold Lenz
- Genre: Tragicomedy
- Setting: French Flanders, 1775

Premiere
- Date: 9 December 1863, Vienna

The Soldiers (German: Die Soldaten) is a 1776 Tragicomedy play by Jakob Michael Reinhold Lenz. The play was influenced by the works of William Shakespeare and can be attributed to the Sturm und Drang literary movement.

The events of the play take place in "French Flanders" and centre around a girl who courts an officer. After he breaks off their relationship, she is branded as a whore by society.

== Plot ==
Marie Wesener, the daughter of a merchant, begins a romantic relationship with the young Officer Desportes, despite being engaged to a cloth dealer called Stolzius. Marie's father initially objects to this relationship, until he realises that Marie's affair with the officer opens up opportunities for social advancement. Thus, he helps Marie to break her engagement with Stolzius by means of a letter, However, Marie's relationship with the young officer is only a short affair. Another soldier named Mary, a friend of Desportes, starts courting Marie soon after.

Marie meets the young Count de la Roche, and his mother takes Marie into her care, to protect her from prosecution. Marie becomes the countess' companion, under the condition that she does not meet with any man for the duration of a year. However, she still meets with Mary, is caught by the countess, and subsequently runs away. Mary, who wanted to marry Marie, doesn't want anything to do with her anymore either, because he learns she has flirted with the young count.

Marie sets off in search of Desportes, but he has her stopped by a hunter with nefarious intentions. When Desportes admits this in the presence of Stolzius, Stolzius poisons him. Mary seeks to avenge his dead friend, but Stolzius has already poisoned himself, committing suicide. Whilst he dies, he reproaches the soldiery for seducing young girls and forcing them to become societal outcasts.

Marie's father has meanwhile also made his way to Desportes. He finds his starving daughter begging on the street; at first, he does not recognise her. They embrace one another.

In the final scene of the play, the countess and a colonel discuss the events that have occurred. They see the unmarried soldiery as a "monster", to which a girl must be occasionally sacrificed as a means of protecting the others. They conclude that in order to prevent this sacrifice a "planting school of soldiers' wives" would have to be founded, in which women would be available to soldiers in a martyr-like fashion. This system would also always provide the prince with new soldiers - the children from these relationships.

== Background ==
As with many of Lenz's works, in The Soldiers he highlights the contradiction between the demands of the Enlightenment toward autonomy and freedom of personal development and the constraints of estate-based society, using this as a way to criticise contemporary German society.

In The Soldiers, he especially criticises the unscrupulous behaviour of soldiers, especially officers, towards daughters of middle-class origins. However, Lenz does not present this as solely the fault of the "pleasure-seeking" soldiers themselves; Marie and her father are also partly to blame for the events of the play; they allow themselves to be blinded by the glamour of the soldiers' uniforms due to their social ambitions.

The play was not performed until nearly one hundred years after its publication; it was first staged in 1863 by E. v. Bauernfeld at the Hoftheather in Vienna (now known as the Burgtheater).

== Adaptations ==
- The Soldiers served as an inspiration for Georg Büchner's Woyzeck, although his play is set in a much lower social class
- In 1930 Manfred Gurlitt set the drama to music as an opera under the title Soldaten ("Soldiers" in English)
- Between 1958 and 1964 Bernd Alois Zimmermann also set the drama to music. The opera "Die Soldaten" premiered in Cologne on 15 February 1965.
