= Santiago a Mil International Theater Festival =

Santiago a Mil International Theatre Festival
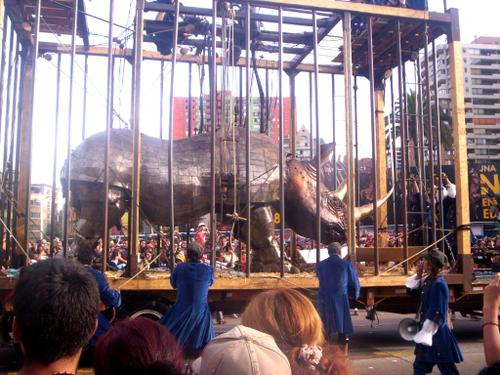
- The Little Giant and the Rhinoceros, at Santiago a Mil
- Location: Santiago, Chile Chile
- Founded: 1994
- Founded by: Teatro a Mil International Festival Foundation
- Festival date: January
- Website: www.santiagoamil.cl

Santiago a Mil International Theatre Festival (Spanish: Festival Internacional Santiago a Mil) is an annual performing arts festival that takes place in January in Santiago, Chile. It is the largest arts festival in Chile and includes theatre, dance and music events from Chile and abroad, performed in the capital city, Santiago, and around the country.

Run by the non-profit Teatro a Mil International Festival Foundation (FITAM), the festival aims to provide affordable access to quality cultural events for the Chilean public, to support the development of theatre and the performing arts in Chile, and to promote Chilean theatre to the international arts scene.

The 2013 edition of the festival hosted 296 indoor events and 80 street-based events, attracting half a million spectators.

== History ==
Santiago a Mil launched in 1994 as the Festival Teatro a Mil. It was renamed Teatro a Mil International Festival in 2001 before assuming its current name in 2006.

The first edition of the festival in 1994 ran for two months in the remodelled Estación Mapocho in Santiago. It was conceived in response to the surge in theatre and the arts experienced in Chile after the end of the military government of Augusto Pinochet in 1990. Three theatre companies took part: Teatro de la Memoria ("Memory Theatre"), who performed the Chile Testimonial Trilogy directed by Alfredo Castro; La Troppa, performing Pinocchio; and Teatro del Silencio ("Theatre of Silence"), who performed Taca-Taca mon amour directed by Mauricio Celedón.

There was no festival in 2021.

== Name ==
The name "Santiago a mil" is Spanish for "Santiago for 1,000 (pesos)" and refers to the low entry price of 1,000 Chilean pesos for events in the festival's early years. It is also a play on the phrase "trabajar a mil por hora", Spanish for "working a mile a minute". Prices for some events have risen over the years but affordability is still a central factor, with several free performances and many low-cost tickets at the 2014 edition of the festival.

== Santiago a Mil 2014 ==
The 2014 edition of Santiago a Mil runs from January 3–19 and includes 390 events: 67 stage shows (35 by Chilean companies and 32 from abroad) as well as music, street theater, workshops, and talks. Almost 50 events are free of charge.

The festival is based in Santiago but events are also being held in the regions of Arica y Parinacota, Tarapacá, Antofagasta, Valparaíso, O’Higgins and Bío Bío.

To mark 21 years since the festival's launch in 1994, the 2014 edition also includes two retrospectives of theatre companies that have taken part in Santiago a Mil since its debut: Viajeinmóvil and Teatrocinema.
