= Endrik Wottrich =

German operatic tenor

Endrik Wottrich (13 October 1964 – 26 April 2017) was a German operatic tenor.

== Life ==
Born in Celle, Wottrich studied singing with Ingeborg Hallstein and violin in Würzburg. With a scholarship from the Studienstiftung des deutschen Volkes, he continued his vocal training at the Juilliard School in New York City with Daniel Ferro.

In September 1992, Wottrich made his stage debut in the role of Cassio in the opera Otello at the Staatstheater Wiesbaden. There, in the 1992/93 season, he also sang the male, youthfully heroic title role of Mathias Freudhofer in the opera Der Evangelimann as an alternative cast, whereby his "baritone-core tenor largely effortlessly overcame the heroic hurdles of the title role, but also possessed the necessary lyrical enamel" Furthermore, in the same season he took over the role of Cassio in the Verdi opera Otello. Subsequently, he was engaged at the Berlin Staatsoper Unter den Linden from 1993 to 1999. An important role debut for Wottrich was the title role in the opera Don Carlos at the Bonn Opera in the 2000/01 season. In a production of the Zurich Opera House (Wiener Festwochen 1997), Wottrich was Alfonso in Franz Schubert's eponymous opera.

Wottrich made his debut in 1996 at the Bayreuth Festival as the Young Sailor in Wagner's Tristan und Isolde and then sang regularly in Bayreuth until 2009. In the summer of 2001, he sang Walther von Stolzing in Die Meistersinger von Nürnberg for the first time at the Bayreuth Festival under the direction of Christian Thielemann.

Wottrich sang the title role in Wagner's Tannhäuser at La Scala and Florestan (Fidelio) at the Royal Opera House Covent Garden in London. He made his debut as Siegmund in Wagner's Die Walküre at the Staatsoper Dresden, and sang Parsifal for the first time in Oslo. During the rehearsals for the Bayreuth Festival 2004, a heated discussion with Parsifal director Christoph Schlingensief erupted. In the first performance of Tristan in the Teatro San Carlo in Naples under Zubin Mehta, he sang the title role in 2015, in the Oper Leipzig he was Arindal in Wagner's Die Feen. Wottrich had one of his last stage appearances as Hagenbach in the production of Alfredo Catalani's La Wally at the Wiener Volksoper.

Wottrich died in Berlin at the age of 52.
