= The Tutor =

5-act play written by Jakob Michael Reinhold Lenz

The Tutor (German: Der Hofmeister, oder Vorteile der Privaterziehung) is an 18th-century German play by Jakob Michael Reinhold Lenz. It has the subtitle "Or The Benefits of a Private Education". In the 20th century, it was adapted into a play of the same name by Bertolt Brecht.
