= Jakob Michael Reinhold Lenz =

German playwright (1751–1792)

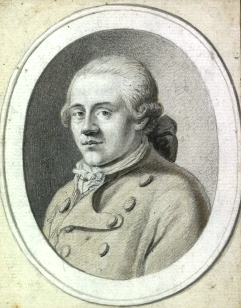
- Born: 23 January 1751; Seßwegen, Governorate of Livonia, Russian Empire (now Cesvaine, Latvia)
- Died: 4 June 1792 (aged 41); Moscow, Russian Empire
- Occupations: Writer, playwright

Jakob Michael Reinhold Lenz (/lɛnts/; German: [lɛnts]; 23 January 1751 (O.S. 12 January 1751) – 4 June 1792 [O.S. 24 May 1792]) was a Baltic German writer of the Sturm und Drang movement.

== Life ==
Lenz was born in Seßwegen, Governorate of Livonia, Russian Empire, now Latvia, the son of the pietistic minister Christian David Lenz (1720–1798), later General Superintendent of Livonia. When Lenz was nine, in 1760, the family moved to Dorpat, now Tartu, where his father had been offered a minister's post. His first published poem appeared when he was 15. From 1768 to 1770 he studied theology on a scholarship, first at Dorpat and then at Königsberg. While there, he attended lectures by Immanuel Kant, who encouraged him to read Jean-Jacques Rousseau. He began increasingly to follow his literary interests and to neglect theology. His first independent publication, the long poem Die Landplagen (Torments of the Land) appeared in 1769. He also studied music, most likely with either the Ukrainian virtuoso lutenist Timofey Belogradsky, then resident in Königsberg, or his student Johann Friedrich Reichardt.

In 1771 Lenz abandoned his studies in Königsberg. Much against the will of his father, who on that account broke off contact with him, he took a position little better than that of a servant with the brothers Friedrich Georg von Kleist and Ernst Nikolaus von Kleist, barons from Courland who were about to begin their military service as officer cadets, whom he accompanied to Strasbourg. Once there, he came into contact with the actuary Johann Daniel Salzmann, around whom had formed the literary group of the Société de philosophie et de belles lettres. The young Johann Wolfgang von Goethe, who happened to be in Strasbourg, also frequented this group. Lenz became an acquaintance of Goethe and of Johann Heinrich Jung-Stilling. Goethe now became Lenz's literary idol, and through Goethe Lenz made contact with Johann Gottfried Herder and Johann Kaspar Lavater, with whom he corresponded.

The following year, 1772, Lenz accompanied the Kleist brothers to the garrisons of Landau, Fort Louis and Wissembourg. He also fell in love with Friederike Brion, once the beloved of Goethe, but his feelings were not reciprocated.

In 1773 Lenz returned to Strasbourg and resumed his studies. The following year he gave up his position with the Kleist brothers and lived as a freelance writer, earning his living by private tutoring. His relations with Goethe became friendlier. While the two of them were visiting Emmendingen, Goethe introduced Lenz to his sister Cornelia and her husband Johann Georg Schlosser.

In April 1776 Lenz followed Goethe to the court of Weimar, where he was at first amicably received. But in early December, on Goethe's instigation, he was expelled. The exact circumstances are unknown. Goethe broke off all personal contact with him after this and once referred in his diary to "Lenz's asininity" ("Lenzens Eseley").

Lenz then returned to Emmendingen, where the Schlossers took him in. From there he made a number of journeys to Alsace and Switzerland, including one to visit Lavater in Zürich in May 1777. The news of Cornelia Schlosser's death, which reached him there in June of that year, had a powerful effect on him. He returned to Emmendingen, and then visited Lavater again. In November, while staying in Winterthur with Christoph Kaufmann, he may have suffered an attack of paranoid schizophrenia. In January 1778 Kaufmann sent Lenz to the philanthropist, social reformer and clergyman Johann Friedrich Oberlin in Waldersbach in Alsace, where he stayed from 20 January to 8 February. Despite the care of Oberlin and his wife, Lenz's mental condition grew worse. He returned to Schlosser at Emmendingen, where he was lodged with a shoemaker and then with a forester.

His younger brother Karl fetched him in June 1779 from Hertingen, where he was under treatment by a doctor, and brought him to Riga, where their father had risen to the position of General Superintendent.

Lenz was unable to establish himself professionally in Riga. An attempt to make him director of the cathedral school came to nothing, as Herder refused to give him a reference. Nor did he have any greater success in St. Petersburg, where he lived from February to September 1780. He then took a position as a private tutor on an estate near Dorpat, returned to St. Petersburg for a time, and then went to Moscow in September 1781, where initially he stayed with the historian Friedrich Müller and learned Russian.

He worked as a private tutor, mixed in the circles of Russian Freemasons and authors, and helped produce a number of reformist schemes. He also translated books on Russian history into German. His mental condition however was steadily deteriorating, and at last he became entirely dependent on the goodwill and financial support of his Russian patrons.

In the early morning of 4 June 1792 (24 May in the Julian calendar) Lenz was found dead in a Moscow street. The place of his burial is unknown.

== Lenz as a literary figure ==
Lenz, a novella fragment by Georg Büchner, dramatizes Lenz's visit to the minister Friedrich Oberlin, in the Vosges. Lenz had visited Oberlin, on the suggestion of Kaufmann, because of his reputation as a pastor and psychologist. Oberlin's account of the events of Lenz's visit furnished Büchner with the source of his story, which in its turn was the source of Wolfgang Rihm's chamber opera Jakob Lenz.

In his 1923 play Weh um Michael, Waldfried Burggraf presented the life of Lenz, explaining his suicide as an act of despair at not finding an audience for his critique of society. One literary critic summarizes Burggraf's treatment: "His Michael Lenz is a voice in the wilderness crying out against moral and social injustice."

In Paul Celan's acceptance speech for the Georg Büchner Prize for Literature in 1960, both the historical man and the "Lenz" of Büchner's fragment figure heavily. In the first line of Büchner's novella, Lenz sets off for the mountains on 20 January. Celan relates this to the life of the poem, asking, "Perhaps one can say that every poem has its 20th of January?" He adds that the poem remains mindful of such dates. Celan also says of his story "Gespräch im Gebirg" ("Conversation in the Mountains"), composed after a missed encounter with Theodor W. Adorno, that it was written from such a date: that he started writing from his own "20th of January".

Later, the writers Peter Schneider, in his story Lenz (1973), and Gert Hofmann, in his novella Die Rückkehr des verlorenen J.M.R. Lenz nach Riga ("The Return of the Lost J.M.R. Lenz to Riga", 1984), gave literary form to the events of his life.

Marc Buhl's novel of 2002, Der rote Domino ("The Red Domino"), uses the friendship between Goethe and Lenz, and its abrupt end, as the inspiration for a detective story.

== Selected works ==
- Die Landplagen (The Torments of the Land). Verse epic, 1769
- Der Hofmeister, oder Vorteile der Privaterziehung (The Tutor, or, The Advantages of Private Education). Drama, 1774
- Der neue Menoza [The New Menoza]. Drama, 1774
- "Anmerkungen übers Theater" ["Observations on the Theatre"]. Essay, 1774
- "Meinungen eines Laien, den Geistlichen zugeeignet" ["Opinions of a Layman, dedicated to the Clergy"]. Essay, 1775
- Pandaemonium Germanicum. Drama, written in 1775, published posthumously 1819
- Die Soldaten [The Soldiers]. Drama, 1776 (basis of the opera of the same name by Bernd Alois Zimmermann and a source of Büchner's drama Woyzeck)
- "Über die Soldatenehen" ["On Soldiers' Marriages"]. Essay, 1776
- Die Freunde machen den Philosophen [Friends Make the Philosopher]. Drama, 1776
- Zerbin. Novella, 1776
- Der Landprediger [The Country Pastor or The Country Preacher]. Novella, 1777
- Der Waldbruder [The Friar of the Forest or The Hermit]. Unfinished epistolary novel, published posthumously in 1882

=== Editions ===
- Damm, Sigrid (ed.). Werke und Briefe, 3 vols. Leipzig [München/Wien]: Insel Verlag, 1987. [Lizenzausgabe im Hanser Verlag]. ISBN 3-446-14665-2
- Lauer, Karin (ed.). Werke. Hanser Verlag, München/Wien: Hanser Verlag, 1992. ISBN 3-446-16338-7
- Voit, Friedrich (ed.). Werke [selection]. Stuttgart: Reclam Verlag, 1997. ISBN 3-15-008755-4
- Wagner, Martin, and Ellwood Wiggins (eds., trans.). Selected Works by J. M. R. Lenz: Plays, Stories, Essays, and Poems. Rochester, NY: Camden House, 2019.
- Weiss, Christoph (ed.). Werke: Faksimiles der Erstausgaben seiner zu Lebzeiten selbständig erschienenen Texte, 12 vols. St. Ingbert: Röhrig Verlag, 2001. ISBN 3-86110-071-1

=== Single works ===
- Weiss, Christoph (ed.). Als Sr. Hochedelgebohrnen der Herr Professor Kant den 21sten August 1770 für die Professor-Würde disputierte. Facsimile of the first edition (Königsberg, 1770). Laatzen: Wehrhahn Verlag, 2003. ISBN 3-932324-68-4

== See also ==
- Jakob Lenz, a one-act chamber opera by Wolfgang Rihm

== Further viewing ==
- George Moorse (writer/director): Lenz, with Michael König as J.M.R. Lenz and Louis Waldon as Oberlin, 1971, West Germany.
- Egon Günther (writer/director): Lenz, with Jörg Schüttauf as J.M.R. Lenz and Christian Kuchenbuch as Goethe, 1992, Germany.
