= Britten's War Requiem (1963 recording) =

1963 studio album

War Requiem

Studio album by: Benjamin Britten; London Symphony Orchestra; Galina Vishnevskaya; Peter Pears; Dietrich Fischer-Dieskau; Bach Choir; Melos Ensemble
- Released: May 1963
- Recorded: January 1963
- Venue: Kingsway Hall, London
- Genre: Classical
- Length: 1:21:24
- Label: Decca Records
- Producer: John Culshaw

The Decca 1963 recording of Benjamin Britten's War Requiem was the first set of the work to be released. It features Galina Vishnevskaya, Peter Pears and Dietrich Fischer-Dieskau with the London Symphony Orchestra, the Melos Ensemble, The Bach Choir and the Highgate School Choir, and was conducted by the composer. The recording was made in the Kingsway Hall in London and was produced by John Culshaw for Decca Records. It rapidly became a best-seller on LP and has subsequently been released on CD and as a download.

The work has subsequently been recorded many times, but Britten's 1963 set remains the benchmark according to 21st-century reviewers.

== Background ==
Britten had mixed feelings about recorded music. He felt that the gramophone had made it too easy to listen casually, with insufficient attention, to great music:

Music demands more from a listener than simply the possession of a tape machine or a transistor radio. It demands some preparation, some effort, a journey to a special place, saving up for a ticket, some homework on the programme perhaps, some clarification of the ears and sharpening of the instincts. It demands as much effort on the listener's part as the other two corners of the triangle, this holy triangle of composer, performer and listener.

He nonetheless wrote, "I value very highly the authentic recordings of my works and wish to keep my contract with the Decca Company (which is most sympathetic to the idea) very close indeed ... these major recordings are to be encouraged in every way". Britten recorded mainly for Decca, making his first disc for the company in 1943. As a pianist he made 17 records for Decca between then and 1963, and as a conductor he had recorded his own and other composers' music, including his ballet, The Prince of the Pagodas (1957), three operas – The Turn of the Screw (1955), The Little Sweep (1956) and Peter Grimes (1958), concert works – Serenade for Tenor, Horn and Strings (1944) and Nocturne (1959), and works on a religious theme – St Nicholas (1955) and A Boy Was Born (1957). (Note: Britten had also recorded the Spring Symphony (1960) and Diversions (1954) for Decca by 1963.)

Before the War Requiem was completed the directors of Decca agreed to record it. There was some thought of recording it live at the first performance, in the rebuilt Coventry Cathedral in May 1962. This idea was abandoned: John Culshaw, senior producer and A&R manager for Decca, later wrote that this was as well, given the numerous minor lapses in the performance. Britten wrote the music with the soloists in this recording in mind. He did not originally intend to have a female soloist, but hearing Galina Vishnevskaya sing at Aldeburgh inspired him to include one. Peter Pears and Dietrich Fischer-Dieskau sang in the first performance; Vishnevskaya was unable to perform owing to visa restrictions imposed by the Soviet Union because the piece was seen as "too political" (Heather Harper stood in for her at short notice). Vishnevskaya was, however, permitted to perform in the recording sessions, and Britten's intended line-up of a singer from each of Russia, Germany and Britain was achieved. The recording also featured the London Symphony Orchestra, the Melos Ensemble, The Bach Choir and the Highgate School Choir. It was produced by Culshaw; the engineers were Kenneth Wilkinson and Michael Maeles.

The sessions, at the Kingsway Hall, took place on 3–5,7,8 and 10 January 1963. In his memoirs, Culshaw reports that Vishnevskaya threw a tantrum on the first day of recording, as she believed – not having performed the work before – she was being insulted by being placed with the choir instead of at the front with the male soloists. By the following day she had relented and was thoroughly cooperative.

== Recording setup ==
Culshaw praised Britten for his understanding of the possibilities and limitations of the technical side of stereo recording. They discussed the recording setup in depth and placed each of the three distinct forces – Britten wrote the piece in three distinct planes or levels – in appropriate locations. The two male soloists, representing two soldiers, and the chamber orchestra which accompanies them were placed to the right of the space in a dry acoustic to capture verbal clarity and to more accurately portray Britten's directions in the score, which frequently called for a "cold" tone from the string players. The large forces of the Mass itself (soprano soloist, chorus and orchestra) were placed in the centre of the hall with the chorus in the gallery which gave the desired level of reverberation, implying the large space of a cathedral without losing too much definition. The boys chorus and small organ were placed to the left of the space to create the sense of distance Britten wanted.

== Rehearsal taping ==
Without Britten's knowledge, Culshaw and the engineers taped the rehearsals for the recording and edited the results as a special vinyl record with its own catalogue number, BB50, presented to Britten on his 50th birthday. Britten saw the recording as an invasion of his privacy and the present was not positively received. The rehearsal sequence was included in the 1989 CD reissue of the set, and in subsequent reissues.

== Cover design ==
The Decca art department struggled with a suitable design for the cover of the boxed LP set. Culshaw finally realised "the answer was staring me in the face: it was the cover of the full score published by Boosey and Hawkes. It was jet black and contained, apart from the publisher's imprint, just four words in classically simple white letters: 'Benjamin Britten – War Requiem'. That was all, and it was perfect". The art department was unconvinced, but Culshaw won the backing of Decca's chairman, Sir Edward Lewis, and the design has been retained in the subsequent reissues. According to Mervyn Cooke in his 1997 book about the War Requiem, "sales were doubtless stimulated by the strikingly simple design of the boxed set".

== Reception ==
Like Culshaw's earlier recording of Wagner's Das Rheingold, the 1963 War Requiem defied the gloomy predictions of some colleagues in the record industry and sold prodigiously. Nearly a quarter of a million copies were sold in the five months after its release, and the set topped the classical charts in a dozen countries.

After the initial release, Alec Robertson wrote in The Gramophone, "the stereo reproduces the three different planes of sound even more convincingly than any 'live' performance could ... this wonderful recording, for which one is deeply grateful and which fulfils one's highest expectations". In The Stereo Record Guide in 1966, Edward Greenfield wrote, "This most successful of classical LPs hardly needs a recommendation ... with all the technical care of the Decca engineers, it has deserved all its success", though he expressed reservations about Vishnevskaya, and later wrote, "The one weakness is the uncertain intonation of the soprano soloist in the Sanctus and her forced tone at the climax of the concluding chorus. (One misses Heather Harper's lovely performance of this part)". In 1967 William Mann wrote that "this authoritative recorded performance, and the huge sales the set has had" should prevent lesser versions from being issued on record.

International praise quickly followed. A Canadian reviewer called it "a great recording of a great work, perhaps the best work of the past 25 years". In The New York Times, Raymond Ericson wrote, "So much praise has been given Benjamin Britten's War Requiem since its premiere on May 30, 1962, that misgivings were bound to enter the mind of the listener as he approached the work for the first time. Could it be that good? Hearing the recording should dispel anxiety. It is an inspired creation, disturbing, moving and extraordinarily beautiful – and timely". There was similar praise in The Age in Australia, which called the recording "profoundly moving ... of the highest order ... inspired".

More recent reviews have also praised the set. In 1999, surveying the versions of the work available by then, The Guardian's music critic wrote, "Britten's own 1963 performance remains unsurpassed ... It is a spine-tingling experience". In a comparative review of fourteen shortlisted recordings of the War Requiem in November 2022, Gramophone's reviewer said that Britten's 1963 set "has justifiably acquired iconic status" and classed it as incomparable: "one of the most celebrated commercial recordings ever made, this matchlessly authentic performance should be in every CD collection. The Decca production team convey Britten's genius in full light with definitive performers who give of their all." In a comparative review for the BBC in 2024 Elin Manahan Thomas, who shortlisted twelve recordings, concluded that Britten's version was a clear first choice. (Note: Recordings common to both shortlists were those conducted by Martyn Brabbins, John Eliot Gardiner, Richard Hickox, Mariss Jansons, Paul McCreesh, Gianandrea Noseda, Antonio Pappano and Simon Rattle.)

== Reissues ==
The recording was issued on CD in 1985, and reissued with the rehearsal sequence in 1989. It was remastered and reissued in 2006, and again in 2013 and on SACD in 2023. It has also been released as a download.

== Notes, references and sources ==
=== Sources ===
- Britten, Benjamin (2003). Paul Kildea (ed.). Britten on Music. Oxford and New York: Oxford University Press. ISBN 1-383-00885-X.
- Cooke, Mervyn (1996). Britten, War Requiem. Cambridge: Cambridge University Press. ISBN 0-521-44089-0.
- Culshaw, John (1981). Putting the Record Straight. London: Secker & Warburg. ISBN 0-436-11802-5.
- Mann, William, ed. (1967). "The 20th Century". The Great Records. Blackpool: Long Playing Record Library. OCLC 555041974.
- March, Ivan; Edward Greenfield; Denis Stevens; Robert Layton (1966). The Stereo Record Guide: Volume 4. Blackpool: Long Playing Record Library. OCLC 748541645.
- Reed, Philip; Mervyn Cooke (2010). Letters From a Life: The Selected Letters and Diaries of Benjamin Britten 1913–1976, Volume 5. Woodbridge: Boydell. ISBN 9781843835912.
- Solti, Georg (1997). Solti on Solti. London: Chatto and Windus. ISBN 978-0-7011-6630-4.
