= Symphony No. 4 (Beethoven) =

1808 composition by Ludwig van Beethoven

- by Ludwig van Beethoven
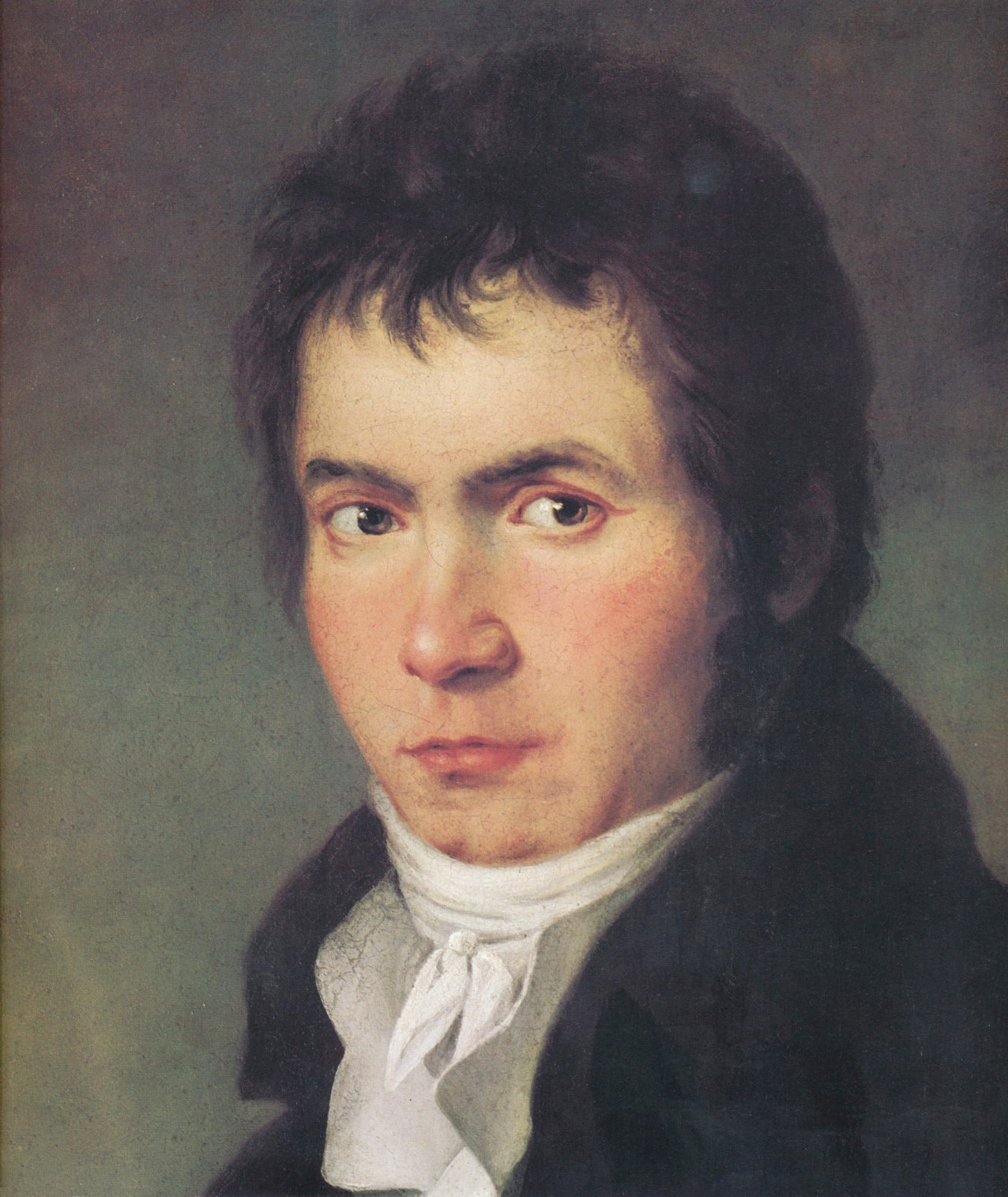
- Beethoven around the time he completed the symphony
- Key: B♭ major
- Opus: 60
- Commissioned by: Count Franz von Oppersdorff
- Composed: 1806
- Published: 1809 (orchestral parts); 1821 (full score)
- Duration: 30–35 minutes
- Movements: 4
- Scoring: Orchestra

Premiere
- Date: April 1808
- Location: Burgtheater, Vienna
- Conductor: Ludwig van Beethoven

The Symphony No. 4 in B♭ major, Op. 60, is the fourth-published symphony by Ludwig van Beethoven. It was composed in 1806 and premiered in March 1807 at a private concert in Vienna at the town house of Prince Lobkowitz. The first public performance was at the Burgtheater in Vienna in April 1808.

The symphony is in four movements. Commentators have described the symphony as genial in tone and have treated it as overshadowed by the Third Symphony (Eroica) and the Fifth, which precede and follow it. Berlioz, Mendelssohn and Schumann admired the work, though it has remained less widely performed and less widely known than the Eroica and the Fifth.

== Background ==
Beethoven spent the summer of 1806 at the country estate of his patron, Prince Lichnowsky, in Silesia. In September Beethoven and the Prince visited the house of one of the latter's friends, Count Franz von Oppersdorff, in nearby Oberglogau. The Count maintained a private orchestra, and the composer was honoured with a performance of his Second Symphony, written four years earlier. After this, Oppersdorff offered the composer a substantial sum to write a new symphony for him. (Note: The fee is variously described as "350 florins" and "500 gulden". Beethoven later received a separate fee of 1500 gulden from the publisher the Wiener Kunst- und Industrie-Comptoir. That sum covered the publishing rights to the symphony together with the Fourth Piano Concerto, the three Razumovsky Quartets, the Violin Concerto and the Coriolan Overture.)

Beethoven had been working on what later became his Fifth Symphony, and his first intention may have been to complete it in fulfilment of the Count's commission. There are several theories about why, if so, he did not do this. According to George Grove, economic necessity obliged Beethoven to offer the Fifth (together with the Pastoral) jointly to Prince Lobkowitz and Count Razumovsky. Other commentators suggest that the Fourth was essentially complete before Oppersdorff's commission, or that the composer may not yet have felt ready to press on with "the radical and emotionally demanding Fifth", or that the count's evident liking for the more Haydnesque world of the Second Symphony prompted another work in similar vein.

The work is dedicated to "the Silesian nobleman Count Franz von Oppersdorff". Although Oppersdorff had paid for exclusive rights to the work for its first six months, his orchestra did not give the first performance. (Note: Beethoven had to write to Oppersdorff apologising for this breach of their agreement. It is not known whether Oppersdorff's orchestra ever performed the work.) The symphony was premiered in March 1807 at a private concert in Vienna at the town house of Prince Lobkowitz, another of Beethoven's patrons. The first public performance was at the Burgtheater in Vienna in April 1808. The orchestral parts were published in March 1809, but the full score was not printed until 1821. The manuscript, which was for a time owned by Felix Mendelssohn, is now in the Berlin State Library and can be seen online.

== Instrumentation ==
The symphony is scored for one flute, two oboes, two soprano clarinets in B♭, two bassoons, two horns in B♭ and E♭, two trumpets in B♭ and E♭, timpani and strings. It typically takes between 30 and 35 minutes to perform. (Note: As well as the tempi adopted by the performers, the playing time is affected by the decision to play or omit the exposition repeat in the first movement. This typically makes a difference of about 2½ minutes. Examples from the versions mentioned in the Recordings section are Klemperer and Monteux, who play the repeat and whose first movements last for 12:28 and 12:37 respectively, compared with Toscanini and Karajan, who omit the repeat and respectively take 9:57 and 9:55. The total playing time of the symphony in these four recordings is 35:49, 34:10, 29:59, and 31:09 respectively.)

== Analysis ==
In general the symphony is sunny and cheerful, with light instrumentation that for some listeners recalls the symphonies of Joseph Haydn, with whom Beethoven had studied a decade before. In a commentary on the symphony Grove comments that Haydn – who was still alive when the new symphony was first performed – might have found the work too strong for his taste. The Fourth Symphony contrasts with Beethoven's style in the previous Third Symphony (Eroica), and has sometimes been overshadowed by its massive predecessor (Note: In the Eroica the four movements consist of 691, 247, 442 and 473 bars; the Fourth consists of 498, 104, 397 and 355 – making the Fourth 499 bars shorter than its predecessor.) and its fiery successor, the Fifth Symphony.

=== I. Adagio – Allegro vivace ===
1st movement: Allegro vivace
Performed by the Skidmore College Orchestra, courtesy of Musopen

The first movement is in 2/2 time. Like those of the first, second, and seventh of Beethoven's nine symphonies, it has a slow introduction. Leonard Bernstein described it as a "mysterious introduction which hovers around minor modes, tip-toeing its tenuous weight through ambiguous unrelated keys and so reluctant to settle down into its final B♭ major." It begins in B♭ minor with a low B♭, played pizzicato and pianissimo by the strings, followed by a long-held chord in the winds, during which the strings move slowly in the minor.

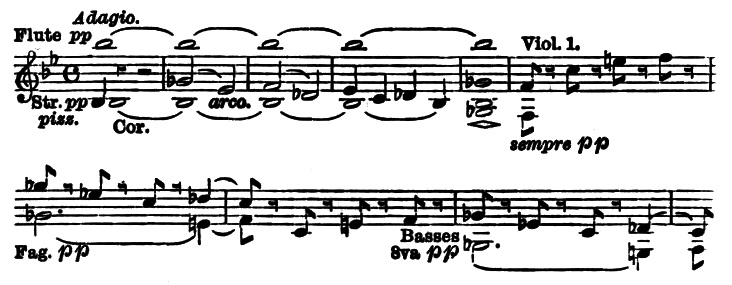

The quiet introduction is thirty-eight bars long, and is followed by a fortissimo repetition of the chord of F, leading into the allegro vivace first subject of the main, sonata form part of the movement, described by Grove as "gaiety itself, and most original gaiety":

The second subject is, in the words of Donald Tovey, "a conversation between the bassoon, the oboe, and the flute." The development section takes the tonality towards the remote key of B major before returning to the tonic B♭, and the recapitulation and coda follow the conventional classical form.

=== II. Adagio ===
2nd movement: Adagio

The second movement, in 3/4 time (E♭ major), is a slow sonata-rondo. The rhythmic figure of the opening theme persists throughout, and underpins, the whole movement:

Tovey calls the first episode (or second subject) "a still more subtle melody":

The main theme returns in an elaborate variation, followed by a middle episode and the reappearance of the varied main theme, now played by the flute. A regular recapitulation is followed by a coda that makes a final allusion to the main theme, and the timpani bring the movement to an end with the last appearance of the rhythmic theme with which the movement began.

=== III. Scherzo-trio: Allegro vivace ===
3rd movement: Allegro vivace

The movement, in 3/4 and B♭ major, is headed Menuetto in most printed scores, though not in Beethoven's original manuscript. It is marked "Allegro vivace", and was originally to have been "allegro molto e vivace", but Beethoven deleted the "molto" in the autograph score. His metronome marking is dotted minim = 100, at which brisk speed a traditional minuet would be impossible. Haydn had earlier wished that "someone would show us how to make a new minuet", and in this symphony, as in the First, Beethoven "forsook the spirit of the minuet of his predecessors, increased its speed, broke through its formal and antiquated mould, and out of a mere dance-tune produced a Scherzo". (Grove).

In the Fourth Symphony (and later, in the Seventh) Beethoven further departed from the traditional minuet-trio-minuet form by repeating the trio after the second rendition of the scherzo section, and then bringing the scherzo back for a third hearing. The final repetition of the scherzo is abridged, and in the coda the two horns "blow the whole movement away" (Tovey).

=== IV. Allegro ma non troppo ===
4th movement:Allegro ma non troppo

The last movement is in 2/4 time in B♭ major. The tempo marking is Allegro ma non troppo; this, like that of the third movement, is an afterthought on Beethoven's part: the original tempo indication in the autograph score is an unqualified "allegro". The composer added (in red chalk) "ma non troppo" – i.e. but not too much so. The movement is in a playful style that the composer called aufgeknöpft (unbuttoned).

After some 340 bars of what Grove describes as a perpetuum mobile, Beethoven concludes the symphony with the Haydnesque device of playing the main theme at half speed, interrupted by pauses, before a final fortissimo flourish.

== Reception ==
As usual by this stage of the composer's career, the symphony divided opinion among those who heard early performances. In 1809 Carl Maria von Weber wrote:

First a slow movement full of short disjointed unconnected ideas, at the rate of three or four notes per quarter of an hour; then a mysterious roll of the drum and passage of the violas, seasoned with the proper quantity of pauses and ritardandos; and to end all a furious finale, in which the only requisite is that there should be no ideas for the hearer to make out, but plenty of transitions from one key to another – on to the new note at once! never mind modulating! – above all things, throw rules to the winds, for they only hamper a genius.

Other critics were less hostile, praising the composer's "richness of ideas, bold originality and fullness of power" though finding the Fourth and the works premiered alongside it "rough diamonds". Beethoven's biographer Anton Schindler later recalled the Fourth as being a great success from the outset, although later scholars have expressed reservations about his reliability.

When Beethoven's younger contemporary Hector Berlioz heard the symphony he wrote that the slow movement was the work of the Archangel Michael, and not that of a human. Nonetheless, by the time Berlioz was writing musical criticism, the Fourth was already less often played than other Beethoven symphonies. Robert Schumann is said to have called the Fourth Symphony "a slender Greek maiden between two Norse giants", (Note: In a 2012 study of the Symphony the musicologist Mark Ferraguto casts doubt on whether the phrase can reliably be attributed to Schumann. Ferraguto suggests that it originated in Grove's gloss on, or misremembering of, words actually used by Schumann.) and it was an important influence on his First Symphony. Mendelssohn loved the Fourth, and programmed it when he was conductor of the Leipzig Gewandhaus Orchestra. But their enthusiasm was not shared by the wider musical public. As early as 1831 a British critic noted that the Fourth was the "least frequently brought forward" of the first six, though, in his view "not inferior to any". In 1838 the French impresario Louis-Désiré Véron called the Fourth sublime and regretted that in Paris it was not merely neglected but denigrated. In 1896 Grove commented that the work had "met with scant notice in some of the most prominent works on Beethoven".

In the 20th century, writers continued to contrast the Fourth with the Eroica and the Fifth. In a study of the Fourth written in 2012 Mark Ferraguto quotes a 1994 description of the work as "a rich, verdant valley of yin expressiveness … poised between the two staggering yang peaks of the Third and the Fifth".

According to the musicologist Robert Greenberg of the San Francisco Conservatory of Music:

If any of Beethoven's contemporaries had written this symphony, it would be considered that composer's masterwork, and that composer would be remembered forever for this symphony, and this symphony would be played – often – as an example of that composer's great work. As it is, for Beethoven, it is a work in search of an audience. It's the least known and least appreciated of the nine.

== Recordings ==
The symphony has been recorded, in the studio and in concert performances, more than a hundred times. Early recordings were mostly issued as single sets, sometimes coupled with another Beethoven symphony, such as the Second. More recently, recordings of the Fourth have often been issued as part of complete cycles of the Beethoven symphonies.

Monaural recordings, made in the era of 78 rpm discs or mono LPs, include a 1933 set with Felix Weingartner conducting the London Philharmonic Orchestra, a 1939 version by the BBC Symphony Orchestra conducted by Arturo Toscanini, recordings from the 1940s conducted by Willem Mengelberg, Serge Koussevitzky and Sir Thomas Beecham, and from the early 1950s under Georg Solti (1951) and Wilhelm Furtwängler (1952).

Recordings from the stereo LP era of the mid-1950s to the 1970s include those conducted by Otto Klemperer (1957), Pierre Monteux (1959), Herbert von Karajan (1963) and Hans Schmidt-Isserstedt (1966).

The late 1950s and early 1960s saw the first recordings based on recent musicological ideas of authentic early-19th-century performance practice: Hermann Scherchen (1958) and René Leibowitz (1961) conducted sets of the symphonies attempting to follow Beethoven's metronome markings, which up to then had been widely regarded as impossibly fast. These pioneering efforts were followed in later decades by recordings of performances in what was currently regarded as authentic style, often played by specialist ensembles on old instruments, or replicas of them, playing at about a semitone below modern concert pitch. Among conductors of such versions of the Fourth Symphony have been Christopher Hogwood (1986), Roger Norrington (1988), Frans Brüggen (1991) and John Eliot Gardiner (1994).

More recently some conductors of modern symphony or chamber orchestras have recorded the Fourth (along with other Beethoven symphonies), drawing to a greater or lesser degree on the practices of the specialist groups. Among these are Nikolaus Harnoncourt (1992), and Sir Charles Mackerras (2007). In a survey of all available recordings in 2015 for BBC Radio 3 the top recommended version was in this category: the Zurich Tonhalle Orchestra, conducted by David Zinman. Among conductors of more traditional recordings have been Leonard Bernstein (1980), Claudio Abbado (2000) and Bernard Haitink (2006).

== Notes, references and sources ==
=== Sources ===
- Anderson, Emily (1985). The Letters of Beethoven. Vol. 3. London: Macmillan. ISBN 978-0-333-39833-3.
- Ferraguto, Mark Christopher (2012). Beethoven's Fourth Symphony: Reception, Aesthetics, Performance History (PDF). Ithaca: Cornell University. OCLC 826932734.
- Ford, Gary (2001). RED Classical Catalogue. London: Retail Entertainment Data Publishing and Gramophone. ISBN 978-1-900105-22-4.
- Greenberg, Robert (2003). The Symphonies of Beethoven. Part 2 of 4. Chantilly: Teaching Company. ISBN 978-1-56585-700-1.
- Grove, George (1903) [1896]. Beethoven and His Nine Symphonies. Novello. OCLC 491303365.
- Lockwood, Lewis (2017). Beethoven's Symphonies: An Artistic Vision. New York: W. W. Norton. ISBN 978-0-393-35385-3.
- March, Ivan; Edward Greenfield; Robert Layton; Paul Czajkowski (2008). "Beethoven, Ludwig van – Symphony 4". The Penguin Guide to Recorded Classical Music. London: Penguin. ISBN 978-0-1410-3336-5 – via Internet Archive.
- Netl, Paul (1976). Beethoven Handbook. New York: Frederick Ungar.
- Noorduin, Marten A. (2016). Beethoven's Tempo Indications (PDF). Manchester: University of Manchester. OCLC 1064358078.
- Steinberg, Michael (1995). The Symphony: A Listener's Guide. Oxford: Oxford University Press. ISBN 978-0-19-506177-2.
- Taruskin, Richard (1995). Text and Act: Essays on Music and Performance. New York: Oxford University Press. ISBN 978-0-19-509458-9.
- Thompson, Oscar (1935). How to Understand Music. New York: Dial Press. OCLC 377014.
- Tovey, Donald (1990). Symphonies and Other Orchestral Works. Oxford and New York: Oxford University Press. ISBN 978-0-19-315147-5.
