= René Leibowitz =

Polish and French musician (1913–1972)

Leibowitz, c. mid-1960s

René Leibowitz (/ˈliːbəwɪts/; French: [ʁəne lɛbɔwits]; 17 February 1913 – 29 August 1972) was a Polish and French composer, conductor, music theorist and teacher. He was historically significant in promoting the music of the Second Viennese School in Paris after the Second World War, and teaching a new generation of serialist composers.

Leibowitz remained firmly committed to the musical aesthetic of Arnold Schoenberg, and was to some extent sidelined among the French avant-garde in the 1950s, when, under the influence of Leibowitz's former student, Pierre Boulez and others, the music of Schoenberg's pupil Anton Webern was adopted as the orthodox model by younger composers.

Although his compositional ideas remained strictly serialist, as a conductor Leibowitz had broad sympathies, performing works by composers as diverse as Gluck, Beethoven, Brahms, Offenbach and Ravel, and his repertory extended to include pieces by Gershwin, Puccini, Sullivan and Johann Strauss.

== Life and career ==
=== Early years ===
The facts about Leibowitz's early years are problematical, complicated by his practice of reinventing his history, (Note: The musicologist Reinhard Kapp commented in 1988, "Trustworthy biographical data are almost impossible to find; instead there is a jumble of contradictions, assumptions, myths, and ill-considered conjectures.") but it is known that he was born in Warsaw. According to his pupil and translator, Jan Maguire, who wrote two studies of him for Tempo magazine in the late 1970s, Leibowitz was of Russian Jewish parentage; his father was an art historian. During the First World War the family was obliged to move from Warsaw to Berlin, where, Maguire writes, Leibowitz began a career as a concert violinist at the age of ten. That career was interrupted when the family moved to Paris three years later. By Maguire's account Leibowitz taught himself "the fundamentals of harmony, counterpoint and score-reading" while in high school, and took his Baccalauréat when he was seventeen. At this point, his history becomes unclear. By his own account, credited by Maguire and others, he then went to Vienna to study with Anton Webern. By other accounts he studied with Arnold Schoenberg. Neither is now believed to be correct: Sabine Meine wrote in the Grove Dictionary of Music and Musicians in 2001, "Leibowitz's claims of having met Schoenberg and studied with Webern in the early 1930s remain unsubstantiated", and in 2012 Nicole Gagné wrote in the Historical Dictionary of Modern and Contemporary Classical Music, "despite his claims to the contrary, he never studied with Arnold Schoenberg or Anton Webern". Other claims about Leibowitz's teachers – that he studied composition with Maurice Ravel and conducting with Pierre Monteux – have been discounted by some writers in the present century, although as recently as 2010 in a study mainly focused on American composers Deborah Fillerup Weagel repeated the statement that Leibowitz was a pupil of Webern and Ravel. There is no mention of Leibowitz in the biographies of Ravel by Arbie Orenstein (1991) and Roger Nichols (2011) or of Monteux by John Canarina (2003).

=== Paris ===
In Paris, according to Maguire, Leibowitz earned his living as a jazz pianist and composed constantly. In his early twenties he married an artist from an illustrious French family and settled down in Paris, eventually taking French nationality. During the early 1930s he was introduced to Schoenberg's twelve-note technique by the German pianist and composer Erich Itor Kahn. Maguire writes that Leibowitz easily fitted into "the ebullient intellectual and artistic climate of Paris in the pre-war years". His aesthetic interests were not confined to music, and he became friendly with leading figures from the world of modern art, notably André Masson and Pablo Picasso, and with literary figures including Jean-Paul Sartre, Simone de Beauvoir and Albert Camus. For Leibowitz, according to Maguire, composing was his most regular activity, and the one he thought most important, although he was known more for his commentaries, his critical and analytical writings, his conducting, and his teaching, all of which he considered secondary.

When the Germans invaded France in the Second World War, Leibowitz was interned as an alien for a time. He did not succeed in emigrating, but, as the musicologist Reinhard Kapp puts it, "managed to survive somehow, partly hidden by [Georges] Bataille in Paris, at other times with his family in the Unoccupied Zone". While in wartime Paris he clandestinely taught students from the Paris Conservatoire. In 1944, just before the liberation of Paris, there was a party at the Left Bank apartment of the Swiss artist Balthus attended by artistic opponents of the Nazis, such as Picasso and others; Leibowitz provided the music.

=== Post-war ===
After the liberation Leibowitz resumed his interrupted career, teaching, conducting and writing, drawing on the extensive material he had produced during his enforced wartime seclusion. In 1947–48 and again in 1950 he visited Los Angeles to meet Schoenberg, whose cantata A Survivor from Warsaw he transcribed into full score. Many of the works of the Second Viennese School were first heard in France at the International Festival of Chamber Music established by Leibowitz in Paris in 1947. Leibowitz was highly influential in promoting the reputation of the School, both through teaching in Paris after the war and through his book Schoenberg et son école, published in 1947 and translated by Dika Newlin as Schoenberg and his School (US and UK editions 1949). The book was among the earliest theoretical treatises on Schoenberg's twelve-tone method of composition; Leibowitz (like Humphrey Searle) was among the first theorists to promulgate the term "serialism". The book attracted hostile criticism from composers on various points of the modernist continuum. Aaron Copland condemned its "dogmatic and fanatical" tone, and Milton Babbitt felt that its musical discussions were superficial, with misleading analogies between tonal and dodecaphonic music, but it was well received by the musical public.

Leibowitz's advocacy of the Schoenberg school was taken further by two of his pupils, Pierre Boulez and Jacques-Louis Monod, each taking different paths in promoting the music of Schoenberg, Webern and the development of serialism. Meine writes in Grove that during the 1950s Leibowitz's writings came under attack from some of the younger generation: Boulez and others accused him of "dogmatic orthodoxy and academicism". In the view of another pupil, Maguire, Boulez, having learned the twelve-tone technique from Leibowitz, "proceeded to apply it indiscriminately to every musical element, disregarding the most fundamental qualities, the essence of music". Leibowitz warned his former student, "But the public has not yet assimilated Schoenberg", and tried, unsuccessfully, to avoid a rancorous falling out.

Although Leibowitz composed continually, he seldom pressed to have his works performed. When he died, leaving an oeuvre of nearly a hundred pieces, the magazine Esprit commented, "Modest, perhaps too modest, he never spoke of his works, unless obliged to do so, doing nothing to get them played. It is certainly no exaggeration to say that at least three quarters of his scores have never been heard." Since his death a representative sample of his works have been recorded. A 2013 CD set from the Divox label contains recordings of 22 of Leibowitz's works: 6 Mélodies, Op. 6; Flute Sonata, Op. 12b; Explanation of Metaphors, Op. 15; Duo for Cello and Piano, Op. 23; 5 Pieces for clarinet and piano, Op. 29; Sérénade, Op. 38; 3 Poèmes, Op. 46; Violin Concerto, Op. 50; Marijuana variations non sérieuses, Op. 54; Toccata, Op. 62; 3 Caprices, Op. 70; 2 Settings, Op. 71; 3 Poèmes, Op. 73; Motifs, Op. 74; Petite suite, Op. 75; 2 poèmes, Op. 76a; Chanson dada, Op. 76b; Suite, Op. 81; 4 Lieder, Op. 86; 3 Intermezzi, Op. 87; Laboratoire central, Op. 88; and 3 Poèmes, Op. 92.

Although Leibowitz was receptive to a wide range of musical styles, he could not bear the music of Sibelius, and published a pamphlet about him under the title of Sibelius: the Worst Composer in the World; he also severely criticised Bartók for writing music that was too accessible: Leibowitz felt that by failing to adopt dodecaphony in his later works Bartók was pandering to popular taste rather than helping to move music away from tonality in accordance with Leibowitz's notions of historical inevitability and composers' duty. For Leibowitz, to write a popular work like Bartók's Concerto for Orchestra was a betrayal of modernism.

Grove has articles on thirty-two composers who studied with Leibowitz in Paris or attended his sessions at Darmstadt or elsewhere: as well as Boulez and Monod, they include Vinko Globokar; Hans Werner Henze; Diego Masson; Serge Nigg; and Bernd Alois Zimmermann. (Note: The others are Leni Alexander; André Casanova; Franco Donatoni; Antoine Duhamel; Hans Ulrich Engelmann; Giuseppe Giorgio Englert; Werner Haentjes; Claude Helffer; Stanko Horvat; Keith Humble; Carlos Jiménez Mabarak; Dieter Kaufmann; Maurice Le Roux; Wolfgang Ludewig; Jean-Louis Martinet; Norbert Moret; Diether de la Motte; Tolia Nikiprowetzky; Will Ogdon; Yannis Andreou Papaioannou; Ron Pellegrino; Allan Pettersson; Michel Paul Philippot; Jean Prodromidès; Ruben Radica; and Armin Schibler.) The writer Joan Peyser summed up Leibowitz's career:

one long splendid moment in his life, stretching from Paris in 1944 through Darmstadt in 1948, devoted to the promulgation of Schoenbergian ideas. When, in the late 40s and early 50s, Webern displaced Schoenberg as the venerated man and composers applied the serial idea beyond pitch, Leibowitz's time had passed. He refused to follow that path.

Leibowitz's obituarist in Esprit dismissed this as simplistic:

Let us rise above the very "Parisian" (but untrue) cliché of a René Leibowitz, abandoned by his brilliant pupils, and fallen into oblivion after the 1950s. There were breaks, especially with Boulez, but that did not prevent later generations from coming to lean on him: the generation of Puig, Globokar, etc. It is also true that many myths were circulated about him, both by the academicians who did not forgive him for having introduced the virus of the atonal and by the avant-gardists who found him too conformist.

Leibowitz died suddenly in Paris on 29 August 1972, at the age of 59.

== Recordings ==
In the early LP era, in the 1950s, Leibowitz conducted complete recordings of seven operas, which were generally well received, and have mostly been reissued on CD. They were Bizet's Les Pêcheurs de perles; Gluck's Alceste and L'ivrogne corrigé; Mozart's Zaïde; Offenbach's La Belle Hélène and Orphée aux enfers; and Ravel's L'Heure espagnole. A set of Ravel's orchestral works was less well reviewed, but Leibowitz received qualified praise for his set of Schoenberg's Gurre-Lieder ("Leibowitz makes a serious attempt to produce a convincing performance; his slow tempi find justification in Schoenberg's markings, but his artists cannot persuade us that Gurre-Lieder is other than an historical curiosity").

In 1961 Leibowitz conducted the Royal Philharmonic Orchestra in a set of Beethoven's symphonies made by Decca for Reader's Digest; it was among the first to attempt to follow Beethoven's metronome markings, following the pioneering set made in Vienna three years earlier, conducted by Hermann Scherchen. Reviewers observed that although Scherchen had achieved tempos more closely approaching the composer's markings, Leibowitz, at speeds not much slower, had secured better ensemble than the earlier set achieved. Initially the set was poorly received. The Stereo Record Guide called the performances "slack", "perfunctory" and "insensitive"; on its reissue in the 1980s a Gramphone reviewer thought much of the set "light-weight" and "lacking in gravitas", although he found the performance of the Seventh Symphony "magnificent". In 1995 Richard Taruskin, analysing a selection of Beethoven recordings, concluded that Leibowitz, like Scherchen, delivered performances that were musically and musicologically superior to more recent attempts by "authentic" conductors such as Christopher Hogwood. By the 21st century the performances had come to seem old-fashioned, in the view of a critic in Fanfare, who found them more akin to those by Herbert von Karajan than to those by specialist authenticists such as Roger Norrington and John Eliot Gardiner.

With the Decca team, Leibowitz recorded eleven more albums between 1959 and 1962. They included large-scale works such as The Rite of Spring, symphonies by Mozart, Schubert, Schumann, and concertos by Grieg, Liszt, Mendelssohn, Prokofiev, as well as short pieces by more than thirty composers ranging from Bach to Gershwin, from Wagner to Sullivan, Puccini and Johann Strauss.

== Works ==
- Piano Sonata op.1 (1939)
- 10 Canons for wind trio op.2 (1939)
- String Quartet no.1 op.3 (1940)
- Symphony op.4 (1941)
- Double concerto for violin, piano and 17 instruments op.5 (1942)
- 6 Songs for bass and piano op.6 (1942)
- Tourist Death, concert aria for soprano and chamber orchestra (T: Archibald MacLeish) op.7 (1943)
- 4 Piano Pieces op.8 (1943)
- 3 Songs for soprano and piano (T: Pablo Picasso) op.9 (1943)
- Chamber Concerto for nine instruments op.10 (1944)
- Wind Quintet op.11 (1944)
- Sonata for violin and piano op.12a (1944)
- Sonata for flute and piano op.12b (1944)
- Empedokles for mixed a cappella chorus (T: Friedrich Hölderlin) op.13 (1944/45)
- Variations for orchestra op.14 (1945)
- L'explication des métaphores/Explanation of Metaphors (T: Raymond Queneau) op.15 (1947)
- Chamber Symphony ("Kammersymphonie") for 12 instruments op.16 (1948)
- La Nuit close, music drama in three acts (T: Georges Limbour) op.17 (1947–50)
- 4 Songs for soprano and piano (T: Michel Leiris) op.18 (1949)
- 3 Piano Pieces op.19 (1949)
- Piano Trio op.20 (1950)
- L'Emprise du Donné op.21 (1950)
- String Quartet no.2 op.22 (1950)
- Duo for cello and piano op.23 (1951)
- Perpetuum Mobile: The City – A Dramatic Symphony for Narrator and Orchestra (T: William Carlos Williams) op.24 (1951)
- 5 Songs for soprano and piano op.25 (1951)
- String Quartet no.3 op.26 (1951)
- Fantasy for piano op.27 (1952)
- 6 Short Piano Pieces op.28 (1952)
- 5 Pieces for clarinet and piano op.29 (1952)
- La Circulaire de minuit, opera in three acts (T: Georges Limbour) op.30 (1953)
- 6 Orchestral Pieces op.31 (1954)
- Concerto for piano and orchestra op.32 (1954)
- Träume vom Tod und vom Leben – Eine Symphonie für Soli, Sprecher, gemischten Chor und Orchester (T: Hans Arp) op.33 (1954–55)
- 4 Songs for soprano and piano (T: James Joyce) op.34 (1954)
- Concertino for viola and chamber orchestra op.35 (1954)
- Rhapsodie Concertante for violin and piano op.36 (1955)
- La notte (T: Angelo Poliziano), Epigramma (T: Torquato Tasso) and A se stesso (T: Giacomo Leopardi) for mixed chorus op.37 (1955)
- Serenade for baritone and eight instruments (T: Friedrich Hölderlin, Clemens Brentano) op.38 (1955)
- Symphonic Fantasy for orchestra op.39 (1956)
- The Renegade for mixed chorus and instruments (T: Lionel Abel) op.40 (1956)
- Capriccio for high soprano and nine instruments (T: Friedrich Hölderlin) op.41 (1956)
- String Trio op.42 (1956)
- Sonata quasi una fantasia for piano op.43 (1957)
- Humoresque for six percussionists op.44 (1957)
- String Quartet no.4 op.45 (1958)
- Trois Poèmes de Georges Limbour for soprano and six instruments (T: Georges Limbour) op.46 (1958)
- Concertino for piano duet op.47 (1958)
- Overture for orchestra op.48 (1958)
- Damocles, song cycle for soprano and piano (T: Michel Leiris) op.49 (1958)
- Concerto for violin and orchestra op.50 'dedicated to Ivry Gitlis' (1958)
- 3 Bagatelles for string orchestra op.51 (1958)
- Art for Art's Sake – A Fantasia for Jazz Orchestra op.52 (1959)
- Concertino for trombone and orchestra op.53 (1960)
- Marijuana – Variations non sérieuses op.54 (1960)
- Sinfonietta da Camera op.55 (1961)
- Fantasy for violin solo op.56 (1961)
- Introduction, Funeral March and Fanfare op.57 (1961)
- Concerto for cello and orchestra op.58 (1962)
- String Quartet no.5 op.59 (1963)
- Les Espagnols à Venise – Opera buffa in one act (T: Georges Limbour) op.60 (1964)
- Quatre bagatelles for trombone and piano op.61 (1963)
- Toccata pour piano op.62 (1964)
- Symphonic Rhapsody for orchestra op.63 (1965)
- Trois Études miniatures for piano op.64 (1965)
- String Quartet no.6 op.65 (1965)
- Suite for violin and piano op.66 (1965)
- 2 Songs for soprano and piano (T: Aimé Cesaire) op.67 (1965)
- A Prayer – A Symphonic Cantata for mezzo-soprano, male chorus and orchestra (T: James Joyce) op.68 (1965)
- Sonatina for flute, viola and harp op.69 (1966)
- Trois Caprices for vibraphone op.70 (1966)
- Two Settings after William Blake for mixed chorus (T: William Blake) op.71 (1966)
- String Quartet no.7 op.72 (1966)
- Trois Poèmes de Georges Bataille for bass and piano (T: Georges Bataille) op.73 (1966)
- Motifs for speaker and instruments (T: Georges Limbour) op.74 (1967)
- Petite Suite for piano op.75 (1966)
- Deux Poèmes for soprano and piano (T: Michel Leiris) op.76a (1966)
- Chanson Dada, three melodramas for treble and instruments (T: Tristan Tzara) op.76b (1966)
- Sonnet for soprano and five instruments (T: E. E. Cummings) op.77 (1967)
- Rondo capriccioso for piano op.78 (1967)
- Capriccio for flute and strings op.79 (1967)
- 4 Songs for bass and piano (T: Carl Einstein) op.80 (1967)
- Suite for nine instruments op.81 (1967)
- Legend for soprano, piano and orchestra (T: Hart Crane) op.82 (1968)
- String Quartet no.8 op.83 (1968)
- Saxophone Quartet op.84 (1969)
- Labyrinthe, music drama in one act (T: René Leibowitz after Charles Baudelaire) op.85 (1969)
- 4 Songs for bass and piano (T: Paul Celan) op.86 (1969)
- Tre Intermezzi per pianoforte op.87 (1970)
- Laboratoire Central – Short Cantata for speaker, female chorus and instruments (T: Max Jacob) op.88 (1970)
- Scene and Aria for soprano and orchestra (T: Georg Heym) op.89 (1970)
- Clarinet Sextet op.90 (1970)
- Todos Caeràn, opera in 2 acts and 5 tableaux (T: René Leibowitz) op.91 (1971)
- Trois Poèmes de Pierre Reverdy for vocal quartet and piano (T: Pierre Reverdy) op.92 (1971)
- String Quartet no.9 op.93 (1972)

== Discography (incomplete) ==
=== As conductor ===
==== Mono recordings ====
- Bizet: Les Pêcheurs de perles. Mattiwilda Dobbs, Enzo Seri, Jean Borthayre; Paris Philharmonic Chorus and Orchestra. Preiser (CD)
- Gluck: Alceste – Semser, Seri, Demigny, Mollien, Hoffmann, Lindenfelder, Chœur et Orch Phil de Paris, Jean-Pierre Rampal, Orchestre Philharmonique de Paris (1950)
- Gluck: L'ivrogne corrigé: Jean-Christophe Benoît, Bernard Demigny, Claudine Collart, Freda Betti and Jean Hoffmann. (Nixa, 1951)
- Massenet & Puccini: A Portrait of Manon – Anna Moffo, Giuseppe di Stefano, Flaviano Labo, Robert Kerns – RCA Italiana Opera Chorus and Orchestra, Testament (CD)
- Offenbach: La Belle Hélène. Paris Philharmonic Chorus and Orchestra. Regis (CD)
- Offenbach: Orphée aux enfers – Paris Opera Chorus and Orchestra. Regis (CD), also Preiser (CD)
- Ravel: L'Heure espagnole – Janine Linda, André Dran, Jean Mollien, Jean Hoffmann, Lucien Mans, Orch Radio-Symph de Paris (Vox PL7880)
- Rossini: overtures to L'Italiana in Algeri, La gazza ladra, Guillaume Tell, Semiramide – Pasdeloup Orchestra (Urania-USD-1014)
- Roussel: Le Festin de l'Araignée suite (1912) & Le Marchand de sable qui passe – Paris Philharmonic Orch (Counterpoint-Esoteric LP 5511)
- Schoenberg: Gurre-Lieder. Ethel Semser, Nell Tangeman, John Riley, Richard Lewis, Ferry Gruber, Morris Gesell, Chœurs et Orchestre de la Nouvelle Association Symphonique de Paris.
- Schoenberg: Piano Concerto Op. 42. Claude Helffer (piano), Orchestre Radio-Symphonique de Paris. Counterpoint (LP)
- Schoenberg: Pierrot lunaire. Ethel Semser, The Virtuoso Chamber Ensemble. Argo/Westminster (LP)

==== Stereo recordings ====
- May 1959
  - International Symphony Orchestra
    - Schumann Symphony No. 3 in E-flat Op. 97 "Rhenish"
    - Liszt Mephisto Waltz No. 1 S110/2
- June 1959
  - "London Festival Orchestra" (New Symphony Orchestra of London)
    - Stravinsky The Rite of Spring
    - Debussy Prélude à l'après-midi d'un faune
- June 1960
  - Malcolm Frager (piano)
  - Paris Conservatoire Orchestra
    - Prokofiev Piano Concerto No. 2 in G minor Op. 16
- June 1960
  - Paris Conservatoire Orchestra
    - Offenbach Orphée aux enfers: Overture
    - Debussy Petite Suite: En bateau
    - Ravel Bolero
    - Ravel La valse
    - Gounod Faust: Ballet Music
    - Gounod Funeral March of a Marionette
    - Saint-Saëns Danse Macabre Op. 40
    - Pierné Marche des petits soldats de plomb
    - Borodin Prince Igor: Overture & Polovtsian Dances
    - Dukas L'apprenti sorcier
    - Bizet Carmen: Suite
    - Auber Les diamants de la couronne: Overture
    - Offenbach Les contes d'Hoffmann: Barcarolle
    - Puccini Manon Lescaut: Intermezzo
    - Mozart Le nozze di Figaro K492: Overture
- February 1961
  - "London Festival Orchestra"
    - Chopin Polonaise in A-flat Op. 53
    - Gade Jealousy
    - Delibes La Source: Intermezzo
    - Waldteufel Les Patineurs – Waltz Op. 183
    - Dinicu Hora Staccato
    - Dvořák Humoresque Op. 101/7 B187/7
    - Ippolitov-Ivanov Procession of the Sadar Op. 10
    - Bizet Carmen: Habañera
    - Bach-Gounod Ave Maria
    - Franck Panis Angelicus
    - Trad. Londonderry Air & Greensleeves
    - J. Strauss II Die Fledermaus: Overture
    - Falla El Amor Brujo: Ritual Fire Dance
    - Gershwin Porgy and Bess: Excerpts
    - Boccherini String Quintet in E G275: Minuet
    - Sullivan HMS Pinafore: Overture
    - Rimsky-Korsakov Tsar Saltan: Flight of the Bumble Bee
    - Beethoven Die Ruinen von Athen, Op. 113: Turkish March
- April, May and June 1961
  - Inge Borkh (soprano), Ruth Siewert (contralto), Richard Lewis (tenor), Ludwig Weber (bass), Royal Philharmonic Chorus; Royal Philharmonic Orchestra
    - Beethoven: Symphonies 1–9
- January and February 1962
  - Royal Philharmonic Orchestra
    - Mozart Symphony No. 41 in C, K551 "Jupiter"
    - Wagner Tannhäuser: Overture
    - Bach-Leibowitz Passacaglia and Fugue in C minor BWV 582
    - Schubert Symphony No. 9 in C, D944 "Great"
    - Offenbach-Leibowitz La vie parisienne
- February 1962
  - Royal Philharmonic Orchestra
    - Musorgsky-Ravel Pictures at an Exhibition
    - Mendelssohn A Midsummer Night's Dream Overture Op. 21
    - Mendelssohn Octet in E-flat Op. 20: Scherzo
    - Mussorgsky-Leibowitz Night on the Bare Mountain
    - Beethoven Leonore Overture No. 3, Op. 72a
    - Wagner Die Meistersinger: Prelude to act 1
- October 1962
  - Hyman Bress (violin)
  - Earl Wild (piano)
  - Royal Philharmonic Orchestra
    - Mendelssohn Violin Concerto in E minor Op. 64
    - Grieg Piano Concerto in A minor Op. 16
    - Beethoven Egmont Op. 84: Overture
- December 1962
  - Royal Philharmonic Orchestra
    - Weber Der Freischütz J277: Overture
    - Schumann Manfred Op. 115: Overture
- March 1963
  - Leonard Pennario (piano)
  - London Symphony Orchestra
    - Liszt Piano Concerto No. 1 in E-flat S124
    - Liszt Piano Concerto No. 2 in A S125

== Publications by Leibowitz ==
- 1947 Schoenberg et son école: l'étape contemporaine du langage musical. [Paris]: J.B. Janin. (English edition, as Schoenberg and His School: The Contemporary Stage in the Language of Music. Translated by Dika Newlin. New York: Philosophical Library, 1949).
- 1948. Qu'est-ce que la musique de douze sons? Le Concerto pour neuf instruments, op. 24, d'Anton Webern. Liège: Éditions Dynamo.
- 1949. Introduction à la musique de douze sons. Les variations pour orchestre op. 31, d'Arnold Schoenberg. Paris: L'Arche.
- 1950. L'artiste et sa conscience: esquisse d'une dialectique de la conscience artistique. Préf. de Jean-Paul Sartre. Paris: L'Arche.
- 1950. Scènes de la vie musicale américaine. Liège: Éditions Dynamo.
- 1950. Arnold Schoenberg ou Sisyphe dans la musique contemporaine. Liège: Éditions Dynamo.
- 1951. L'évolution de la musique, de Bach à Schoenberg. Paris: Éditions Corrêa.
- 1957. Histoire de l'opéra. Paris: Buchet Chastel.
- 1969. Schoenberg. Paris: Éditions du Seuil.
- 1971. Le compositeur et son double: essais sur l'interprétation musicale. Paris: Gallimard. (Ed. augm., version définitive. Paris: Gallimard, 1986.)
- 1972. Les fantômes de l'opéra: essais sur le théâtre lyrique. Paris: Gallimard.

== Notes, references and sources ==
=== Sources ===
- Canarina, John (2003). Pierre Monteux, Maître. Pompton Plains, New Jersey: Amadeus Press. ISBN 978-1-57467-082-0.
- Fosler-Lussier, Danielle (2007). "Bartók: reception in Cold War Europe". The Cambridge Companion to Bartók. Amanda Bayley (ed). Cambridge: Cambridge University Press. ISBN 978-0-521-66958-0.
- Gagné, Nicole (2012). Historical Dictionary of Modern and Contemporary Classical Music. Lanham, Maryland: Scarecrow Press. ISBN 978-0-8108-7962-1.
- Greenfield, Edward; March, Ivan; Stevens, Denis (1963). The Stereo Record Guide, Volume III. London: Long Playing Record Library. OCLC 23222066.
- Leibowitz, René (1955). Sibelius, le plus mauvais compositeur du monde. Liège: Éditions Dynamo. OCLC 28594116.
- Nichols, Roger (2011). Ravel. New Haven, US and London: Yale University Press. ISBN 978-0-300-10882-8.
- Orenstein, Arbie (1991) [1975]. Ravel: Man and Musician. Mineola, US: Dover. ISBN 978-0-486-26633-6.
- Sackville-West, Edward; Shawe-Taylor, Desmond (1955). The Record Guide. London: Collins. OCLC 500373060.
- Shaw, Jennifer Robin; Auner, Joseph Henry (2011). The Cambridge Companion to Schoenberg. Cambridge: Cambridge University Press. ISBN 978-0-511-78091-2.
- Taruskin, Richard (1995). Text and Act: Essays on Music and Performance. New York: Oxford University Press. ISBN 978-0-19-509458-9.
- Weagel, Deborah Fillerup (2011). Words and Music: Camus, Beckett, Cage, Gould. New York: Peter Lang. ISBN 978-1-4331-0836-5.
