= The Penguin Guide to Recorded Classical Music =

British annual publication

The Penguin Guide to Recorded Classical Music (formerly The Penguin Guide to Compact Discs and, from 2002 to 2006, The Penguin Guide to Compact Discs and DVDs) was a widely distributed annual publication from Britain published by Penguin Books that reviewed and rated currently available recordings of classical music. It was written by Ivan March, a music journalist, consultant and former professional musician; Edward Greenfield, music critic of The Guardian; and Robert Layton, music writer and lecturer. All three were also reviewers for the UK classical music monthly Gramophone. From 2002, a fourth contributor, Paul Czajkowski, was credited, first as assistant editor and then as co-author.

== Background ==
In 1951 the British publisher Collins issued a guide to recorded classical music under the title The Record Guide. The authors were Edward Sackville-West and Desmond Shawe-Taylor. (Note: Sackville-West and Shawe-Taylor were assisted in the second edition by William Mann and Andrew Porter.) Supplements were published in 1952 and 1953; a new edition of the guide was published in 1955, and a final supplement was issued the following year. Four years later the Long Playing Record Library (LPRL) published The Stereo Record Guide, edited by Ivan March and written by March, Edward Greenfield and Denis Stevens. Nine editions were published between 1960 and 1974; Robert Layton joined the panel of reviewers in 1968 and Stevens left after that year's two volumes. The LPRL issued two editions of A Guide to the Bargain Classics, in 1962 and 1965.

== Penguin guides ==
Penguin Books published three editions of The Penguin Guide to the Bargain Classics by March and his co-authors, in 1966, 1970 and 1972. In 1975 they published The Penguin Stereo Record Guide containing 1114 pages and selling for £3.50. From then until 2012, March and his team wrote a succession of Penguin guides.

Title	Date	Ref
The Penguin Stereo Record Guide	1975	
The Penguin Stereo Record Guide	1977	
The Penguin Cassette Guide	1979	
The New Penguin Guide to Bargain Records and Cassettes	1980	
The New Penguin Stereo Record and Cassette Guide	1982	
The Complete Penguin Stereo Record and Cassette Guide	1984	
The Penguin Guide to Compact Discs, Cassettes and LPs	1986	
The New Penguin Guide to Compact Discs and Cassettes	1988	
The New Penguin Guide to Compact Discs and Cassettes Yearbook	1989	
The Penguin Guide to Compact Discs	1990	
The Penguin Guide to Compact Discs and Cassettes Yearbook	1991	
The Penguin Guide to Bargain Compact Discs and Cassettes	1992	
The Penguin Guide to Compact Discs and Cassettes	1992	
The Penguin Guide to Opera on Compact Disc	1993	(Note: Opera synopses researched and written by Katherine March.)
The Penguin Guide to Compact Discs and Cassettes	1994	
The Penguin Guide to Compact Discs Yearbook	1995	
The Penguin Guide to Compact Discs and Cassettes	1996	
The Penguin Guide to Compact Discs Yearbook	1997	
The Penguin Guide to Bargain Compact Discs	1998	
The Penguin Guide to Compact Discs	1999	
The Penguin Guide to Compact Discs Yearbook	2000	
The Penguin Guide to Compact Discs	2001	
The Penguin Guide to Compact Discs and DVDs Yearbook	2002	(Note: Paul Czajkowski is credited from this edition onwards.)
The Penguin Guide to Compact Discs and DVDs	2003	
The Penguin Guide to Compact Discs and DVDs Yearbook	2004	
The Penguin Guide to Compact Discs and DVDs	2005	
The Penguin Guide to Compact Discs and DVDs Yearbook	2006	
The Penguin Guide to Recorded Classical Music	2008	
The Penguin Guide to Recorded Classical Music	2009	
The Penguin Guide to Recorded Classical Music	2010	
The Penguin Guide to the 1000 Finest Classical Recordings	2011	

When the guides started it was still possible to include almost all available stereo classical recordings in the coverage. Additional volumes were printed to cover cassettes, and in the 1984 Guide compact discs were added for the first time. By the 1990 revision CDs had come to dominate the market so completely that LPs were omitted altogether from the guide. In some years the main guide was supplemented by yearbooks, adding the latest new recordings and recommended reissues. Several other supplementary volumes were released covering bargain recordings. From 2001 classical music DVDs were incorporated, initially as an appendix, but, from the 2006 edition, in the main body of the reviews. Although these other volumes added further reviews, the authors acknowledged that attempting to cover all releases was impossible, and they focused on what they regarded as the "cream" of available recordings.

== Ratings ==
The early editions of the guides used a one to three star rating system:

*** "An outstanding performance and recording in every way."
** "A good performance and recording of today's normal high standard."
* "A fair performance, reasonably well or well recorded."

Brackets round one or more of the stars indicated some reservations about its inclusion and readers were advised to refer to the text.

Later editions included a four-star category for a select few recordings, "chosen to indicate music-making in which artists are inspired to excel even their own highest standards or which are offering something quite revelatory about the music. Usually the collector can expect matching quality from the recording team or, where a recording is historical, an outstanding transfer that reveals how fine the original sound was for its period."

From the outset the authors included an additional annotation – a rosette. "Unlike our general evaluations, in which we have tried to be consistent, a Rosette is a quite arbitrary compliment by a member of the reviewing team to a recorded performance which he finds shows special illumination, magic, a spiritual quality, or even outstanding production values that place it in a very special class."

== Reputation ==
In 2011 Ron Cerabona wrote in The Canberra Times, "I owe Penguin a lot: I've discovered a lot of wonderful music through it", but, "If you want to start a flame war on a classical music newsgroup, all you have to do is bring up the allegation of British bias in Penguin (and/or Gramophone)". From a British perspective Terry Grimley wrote in The Birmingham Post in 2005:

Anyone who has taken a moderate interest in recordings of classical music over the last three decades is likely to owe a debt to the Penguin Guide. Widely regarded as the bible of classical recordings, it has actually been sorting the musical wheat from the chaff for 45 years, having begun life as the Stereo Record Guide in 1960.

In the same year The Independent commented that the guide "may be faulted in detail, yet no similar publication matches its consistency and authority in the mainstream classics" In the US, The Denver Post commented, "It is no secret that, even in the classical field, more compact discs are made than any one person can reasonably expect to be able to listen to. What's a poor collector to do? One answer for years has been The Penguin Guide to Compact Discs". In a survey of guides to recorded music in 1997 The Charlotte Observer called the Penguin Guide:

An indispensable bible of recorded classical music, not exhaustive (what book could be?) but more complete than any other I know. The British authors favor British orchestras and performers too much, and they sometimes omit recordings that can be bought in the United States but not in Britain. Yet they're fair, enthusiastic and (in my experience) trustworthy 90 percent of the time. They also distinguish among price ranges of discs, which is rare.

== Notes, references and sources ==
=== Sources ===
- March, Ivan; Edward Greenfield; Denis Stevens; Robert Layton (1968). The Stereo Record Guide: Volume V. London: Penguin.
- March, Ivan; Edward Greenfield; Robert Layton (1972). The Stereo Record Guide: Volume VII. London: Penguin.
- March, Ivan; Edward Greenfield; Robert Layton; Paul Czajkowski (2005). The Penguin Guide to Compact Discs and DVDs. London: Penguin.
- March, Ivan; Edward Greenfield; Robert Layton; Paul Czajkowski (2007). The Penguin Guide to Recorded Classical Music. London: Penguin.
- Sackville-West, Edward; Desmond Shawe-Taylor; William Mann; Andrew Porter (1955). The Record Guide. London: Collins. OCLC 948002674.
