= Stanko Horvat =

Croatian composer and music pedagogue

- Born: 12 March 1930
- Died: 30 October 2006 (aged 76)
- Era: 20th century
- Works: http://quercus.mic.hr/quercus/person/14

Stanko Horvat (12 March 1930 - 30 October 2006, Zagreb) was a Croatian composer and music pedagogue.

== Biography ==
Stanko Horvat graduated from the Music Academy in Zagreb in 1956 where he studied composition in the class of Stjepan Šulek. He further studied on the Paris Conservatoire (1958–59) with T. Aubin and privately with René Leibowitz. At the Electronic Studio of Technische Universität Berlin he has done studio research (1977–78). Between 1961 and 1999, when he retired, he taught at the Music Academy in Zagreb and many of the important Croatian composers were his students. He had a number of important public functions (artistic director of the Music Biennale Zagreb 1985–89; President of the Croatian Composers' Society, 1974–79, etc.). He was a member of the Croatian Academy of Sciences and Arts.

== Oeuvre ==
Horvat's first works are deeply rooted in the classical tradition (Concertino for Strings, 1952). After studying in Paris – and under Leibowitz's influence – he turned to dodecaphony, serialism and other contemporary composition techniques. However, he soon abandoned them as they are incompatible with his sensibility. The Polish School had a much stronger influence on his work (Contrasts for the String Quartet, 1963). In all musical forms that he has employed, Horvat has focused primarily on musical expression. He is inclined towards pure sound, simple form and traditional treatment of the instrument. His works reveal a desire for reconciliation of the contemporary and romantic, the exact and free form, the structured and improvised. His fondness towards simplicity of texture is always apparent, occasionally reminding us of minimalistic music (Accords, 1979; Ostinati, 1983; Concertino for the Piano and Strings, 1996; In modo rustico for the bass-clarinet and piano, 1997). Horvat's works are performed all over Europe and in almost all continents of the globe, at festivals in Croatia (Dubrovnik Summer Festival, Music Biennale Zagreb, Split Summer) and abroad (Warsaw Autumn, Musikprotokoll in Graz, Berliner Biennale, International Festival in Brno).

== Works (selection) ==
- Concertino for strings (1952)
- Symphony (1955)
- The Chosen One (Elu), ballet (1960)
- Trialogue for ondes Martenot (1969)
- Accords for piano (1979)
- Ostinati for piano (1982)
- With a Raised Hand, cantata for soloists, choir and orchestra (1985)
- Deux poemes de G. Apollinaire for twelve singers (1990)
- Jeu de Cloches for marimbaphone and string quartet (1994)
- Cantilene for symphony orchestra (1996)
- In Modo Rustico for bass clarinet and piano (1997)
- Tin - Symphony for solo mezzo-soprano and bass, mixed choir and symphony wind orchestra (1999)
- Dithyrambos, for symphony orchestra (2004)
- Descent to the Top for voice and chamber ensemble (2005)
