= Janet Maguire =

American composer (1927–2019)

- Born: 1927; Chicago, Illinois, U.S.
- Died: 2019 (aged 91–92)
- Occupation: Composer

Janet Maguire (1927–2019) was an American composer who was born in Chicago and resided in Venice, Italy.

== Biography ==
Maguire is known particularly for her arrangement of the finale of Giacomo Puccini's Turandot, in which she exclusively used the sketches Puccini left for it at his death. Maguire is also known for her dramatic contemporary opera in three acts, Hérésie, and has worked in a wide variety of musical expressions throughout some fifty orchestral, chamber, solo, vocal, choral and stage works.

Born in Chicago and raised in New Rochelle, New York, Janet Maguire began musical studies at the age of six: on piano, French horn, and cornet. She completed a BA degree in Piano at Colorado College, then went to Paris to study composition with René Leibowitz for five years. They co-authored the book Thinking for Orchestra: Practical Exercises in Orchestration (published by G. Schirmer), and a book about the orchestration of some of Jacques Offenbach's works, Nuits Parisiennes (RCA, Bote & Bock), as well as Carl Maria von Weber's opera Die Drei Pintos. Several summers spent at the Darmstadt Ferienkurse influenced Maguire's style, as did the music of György Ligeti, Luigi Nono, and Karlheinz Stockhausen.

Maguire continued to develop independent paths in musical thought with the help of several musicians specializing in experimental music.

Maguire was the recipient of the 2008 Guggenheim Fellowship as well as a residence at Copland House in 2006.

Maguire was music critic for the Paris Herald Tribune while she lived in Paris. After moving to Venice, she founded there the association "Musica in Divenire", of which she was elected president, and organized concerts of new music. Her compositions have been heard throughout Italy and Germany, and in France, Spain, Ireland, the UK, the US, Austria, Canada, Argentina, Australia, Latvia and Bulgaria. New World Records issued a CD with seven of her works, and Albany Records released a CD with ten of her works in 2009.

Maguire died in 2019.

== List of works ==
=== Orchestral ===
- Shuffle (1991)
- La Mia Serra (poem by Luisa Milos) with mezzo-soprano solo and chorus (1992)
- Hark (1995)
- Glass (1997)
- Le Jardin de Versailles (1998)
- Fantasia with piano solo (1990)
- Etude Osmotique with chorus SATB (2000)

=== Solo piano ===
- Frills (2002)

=== Piano duet ===
- Ebb and Flow (1999)

=== Piano with orchestra ===
- Fantasia (1990)
- Hark (2000)

=== Piano with chamber ensemble ===
- Treize A Table for piano and 12 percussionists
- Quest for piano and 2 percussions
- L'Intervista for piano, soprano, flute, oboe, clarinet, horn, trumpet, violin, viola, cello and percussion
- Tragedy for piano with string quartet

=== Vocal with ensemble ===
- Canzone D'Amore for tenor and 20 strings
- Un Momento for speaker, 2 violins, 2 violas, 2 cellos, 2 percussionists
- Wisp for soprano, 2 flutes, clarinet, bass clarinet, alto sax, horn, piano, violin, viola, cello, double bass
- Five Chinese Poems (poems by Joseph A. Precker) for bass voice, cello, clarinet, zheng, 3 percussionists
- Lace Knots for string quartet and soprano
- L'Intervista for soprano
- La Mia Serra (poem by Luisa Milos) for orchestra, chorus, contralto
- Gone, (poem by Carl Sandburg) for mezzo-soprano, flute, viola, harp

=== Vocal with piano ===
- Cosi (poem by Paola Bozzini) for soprano
- Cummings Lieder (poems by e.e. Cummings) for soprano
- Three Love Songs (poems by Joseph A. Precker) for tenor

=== Chorus ===
- Southern Trees (poem by Lewis Allan) for 2 sopranos, mezzo-soprano, alto, with chimes
- Il Fiume Tchirek (poem by Altun the Tartar) for 2 sopranos, mezzo-soprano, alto, 2 tenors, 2 baritones and bass
- Lightly for women's chorus with 2 sopranos, mezzo-soprano, alto, with tamburello, crotales, guiro, rainstick
- Inno A Dio for SATB chorus
- Per Acqua (poem by Luisa Milos) for two SATB choruses

=== Piano and voice ===
- Cosi (poem by Paola Bozzini) soprano and piano
- Cummings Lieder (poems by e.e. cummings) soprano and piano
- Three Love Songs (poems by Joseph A. Precker) piano and tenor

=== Percussion ===
- Treize A Table for 13 percussionists with piano
- Quest for piano and 2 percussionists
- Five Chinese Poems, for 3 percussionists, clarinet, cello, zheng, bass voice
- Moondust, for zheng and 4 percussionists
- Wisp, for soprano, two flutes, clarinet, bass clarinet, soprano sax, horn, piano, violin, viola, cello, double bass, 2 percussionists
- Hier Bin Bin Ich, Wo Bist Du? for two flutes, oboe, 2 clarinets, bassoon, double bassoon, 2 horns, 2 trumpets, trombone, 2 violins, viola, cello, double bass, 4 percussionists
- Un Momento, for two percussions, 2 violins, 2 viola, 2 cellos, speaker 5'
- L'Intervista, for soprano, flute, oboe, clarinet, horn, trumpet, violin, viola, cello, piano, percussion

=== Strings ===
==== Quartets ====
- Invenzione
- L'Altro Quartetto with crotales and bongo
- Lace Knots with soprano
- Fumees d'Ivresse for four cellos

==== Duos ====
- Variations for violin and viola
- Scontri for violin and double bass
- Fingers for harp and percussion
- Discussion for harp and oboe

==== Solos ====
- Tango for solo violin
- Sketch for solo violin
- Vagheggiando for solo cello
- A Question for solo viola

==== In ensemble ====
- Canzone d'Amore for 20 strings with tenor voice
- Un Momento for 2 violins, 2 violas, 2 cellos, 2 percussionists, speaker
- Danza for 4 violins, 4 violas, 4 cellos, double bass, oboe, clarinet
- 2 Chinese poems, (Joseph A. Precker poems) for cello, clarinet, zheng, 3 percussionists, bass voice
- Hier bin Ich, Wo bist Du? (Konrad Lorenz gewidmet) for large ensemble
- A Trois - flute, clarinet, violin
- L'Intervista for soprano, violin, viola, cello, flute, oboe, clarinet, horn, timpani, xylophone, percussion, piano
- Moondustfor Zheng and 4 percussionists

=== Winds ===
- Miniotto - two clarinets in B♭

=== Theatrical ===
- Envoys, an opera-ballet based on a haiku-play by Richard France
- Taiga, ballet by Paola Bozzini
- Heresie - opera in 3 acts, libretto by Gabrielle Zimmermann in French

=== Chamber music ===
- Scontri for violin and double bass
- Invenzione for string quartet
- Miniotto for 3 B♭ clarinets
- Discussion for oboe and harp
- Fumees d'Ivresse for four cellos
- Peacock for mezzo-soprano, violin, viola, cello, flute, clarinet, saxophone
- L'Altro Quartetto for string quartet with bongo and crotales
- L'Intervista for soprano, flute, oboe, clarinet, horn, trumpet, violin, viola, cello, xylophone, percussion, piano
- Danza for oboe, clarinet, four violins, four violas, four cellos, double bass, tamtam
- A Trois for flute, clarinet, violin
- Schizzi for film, two clarinets, bass clarinet, two bassoons, four horns, two trumpets, two trombones, timpani, percussion, harp and strings

== Sources ==
- New World Records, Liner Notes: Recorded Anthology of American Music
- Thinking for Orchestra: Practical Exercises in Orchestration, 240 pages, G. Schirmer, Inc. ASIN: B000Z4VKL4(1960)
