= André Casanova =

French composer (1919–2009)

André Marcel Charles Casanova (12 October 1919 – 7 March 2009) was a French composer. He was an early disciple of René Leibowitz, a teacher and composer who maintained a strict adherence to the dodecaphonic musical theories of Arnold Schoenberg. Casanova later abandoned most of them in favour of a more classical style of composition. His published works, composed between 1944 and 1993, include orchestral, chamber and choral music, operas and songs.

== Life and career ==
Casanova was born in Paris, and studied law there, while at the same time studying music with Georges Dandelot at the École Normale de Musique de Paris. In 1944, he became the first French pupil of René Leibowitz, with whom he studied theory and composition. Leibowitz introduced him to dodecaphonic and serial composition. Together with other Leibowitz pupils, Serge Nigg, Antoine Duhamel and Jean Prodromidès, he gave the first performance of Leibowitz's Explications des Metaphors, Op. 15, in Paris in 1948.

Thereafter, according to the Grove Dictionary of Music and Musicians, Casanova's concern was "to ally a romantic spirit with modernity of style". in the mid-1950s he abandoned dodecaphony, although he retained some of its chromatic elements for harmonic purposes. After his avant-garde period, Casanova returned to what Grove calls "a more classical conception of both style and form". In 1959, his Concertino, for piano and chamber orchestra, was performed as a French contribution at the 33rd annual music festival of the International Society for Contemporary Music. In 1960, he received an award from the Queen Marie José Music Foundation for his Cavalier seul, a chamber cantata for baritone and string quartet (later revised for voice and string orchestra), dedicated to Hans Werner Henze.

In the late 1940s, there had been some hostility between adherents of Leibowitz and those of the teacher and composer Olivier Messiaen, but so far as Casanova was concerned, any breach had healed sufficiently during the 1950s for Messiaen's partner Yvonne Loriod to play the solo part at the premiere of Casanova's piano concertino in 1959. He developed an interest in German Romantic literature and with Nietzsche's philosophy, which is reflected in his work. His Third Symphony (Dithyrambes, 1964) has a vocal part, with words by Nietzsche, taken from Dionysos-Dithyramben set in the original German.

In his later years, Casanova lived at Louveciennes on the fringe of Paris, where he died on 7 March 2009, at the age of 89.

== Works ==
=== Orchestral works ===
- Symphony No 1, 1949
- Symphony No 2, Op. 7, 1952 rev 1959
- Concertino for piano and chamber orchestra, Op. 8, 1952 rev 1958 and 1962
- Ballade for clarinet and chamber orchestra, Op. 9, 1955
- Notturno for orchestra, Op. 13 ("In memoriam Richard Strauss"), 1959
- Capriccio for oboe and strings, Op. 16, 1960
- Anamorphoses for orchestra, Op. 17 (dedicated to the memory of Max Reger), 1962
- Impromptus for orchestra, 1963
- Suite for strings, 1964
- Symphony No 3 Dithyrambes, with tenor solo, 1964
- Concerto for violin and orchestra, 1963 (Dedicated to Gerd Albrecht)
- Suite for string orchestra, 1965
- Concerto for trumpet and string orchestra, 1966
- Strophes for orchestra Op 33, 1968
- Prelude, Op. 34 for string orchestra, 1968
- Fantaisie for French horn, string orchestra and marimbaphone, 1968
- Concerto for oboe harp brass and percussion, 1968
- Musique concertante for cor anglais and orchestra, 1969
- Alternances, Op. 41, 1971
- Concerto for organ and orchestra, 1972
- Recitatifs for orchestra Op 48, 1973
- Guitar Concerto, 1973
- Épisodes pour cordes avec violon principal, Op. 47, 1974
- Partita pour ensemble orchestral, Op. 65, 1979
- Piano Concerto, 1981
- Violin Concerto, 1982
- Métaphonie, 1982
- Ein Musikalisches Opfer, Op. 70 ("À la mémoire d'Ottorino Respighi"), 1971
- Ephemeris. op. 81 ("À la mémoire d'Alexander Glazunov"), 1989
- Symphony No 4, 1992
- Symphony No 5, 1993

=== Chamber ===
- 3 pieces for piano, 1944
- Trio for flute, viola and horn/bass clarinet, 1946
- Duo for clarinet and bassoon, 1950
- 4 Bagatelles for wind quintet, 1955
- Elégie for piano trio, 1956
- Humoresque for flute and clarinet, 1957
- Trio for strings, 1966
- Serenata for flute and ensemble, Op. 26, 1966
- String Quartet No 1, Op. 27, 1967
- 4 Intermezzi for piano, Op. 28, 1967
- 3 momenti for brass quintet, Op. 37, 1968
- Quintet for piano and winds, Op. 39, 1970
- Trio for piano-violin-cello, Op.43, 1972
- 5 Little Pieces for cello, Op.45, 1972
- Due canzoni for alto saxophone, clarinet, trumpet, percussion, organ and bass guitar, Op. 49, 1973
- Sextet for clarinet, string quartet and double bass, Op. 63, 1983
- Septet for clarinet, bassoon, horn, violin, viola, cello and double bass, Op. 72, 1985
- String Quartet No 2, 1985
- String Quartet No 3, Op. 73, 1985
- Piccolo studio for bassoon and piano, 1986
- Six évocations for flute, clarinet, violin, cello and piano, Op. 76, 1987
- Quintet for strings, 1988
- Sonata for violin and piano, 1988
- String Quartet No 4, 1990
- String Quartet No 5, 1991
- String Quartet No 6, 1992

=== Choral and song ===
- 3 mélodies, for soprano and piano, 1945
- Divertimento, Op 10, 1953
- Cavalier seul for baritone and string quartet, 1959 (arr for baritone and string orchestra, 1964)
- Redoutes for baritone and orchestra, 1962
- Le livre de la foi jurée, after La chanson de Roland, for speaker, soprano, bariton and orchestra, 1964
- Le chant d'Aude for soprano and string orchestra, 1965
- Règnes, for soprano and orchestra, Op. 29, "In memoriam Jean Cocteau", 1967
- 3 poèmes de Rilke for chorus, 1968
- 5 mélodies for tenor and chamber orchestra, 1968
- 3 sonnets de Louise Labé, for soprano and piano, 1972
- Rituels, Op.46, for baritone and ensemble, 1972
- Deux fragments d'Algabal de Stefan George for mezzo-soprano, clarinet, bassoon, vibraphone and cello, Op. 52, 1973
- Sur les chemins d'acanthes noires, cantata for reciter, baritone, male choir, and orchestraon solo choeur d'hommes et orchestre, Op. 55, 1974
- Quatre dizains de la Délie de Scève, Op. 61, 1978
- Esquisses pour une tragédie, Op. 64, 1979
- Deutsche Gesänge, 1980

=== Stage works ===
- La clé d'argent, conte lyrique, in one act. Text by Jean Moal after Villiers de l'Isle-Adam, 1965
- Le livre de la foi juree, geste lyrique, 1965
- Le bonheur dans le crime, opera in a prologue and three acts. Text by Bernard George after the novel by Jules Barbey d'Aurevilly, 1969
- La coupe d'or, opera in one act. Text by Jean Moal after Ludwig Tieck, 1970
- Notturno, ballet, 1972

== Notes and sources ==
=== Sources ===
- Martini, Fritz (1972). Forschungsbericht zur deutschen Literatur in der Zeit des Realismus. Stuttgart: Metzler. OCLC 708527701.
