= Serge Nigg =

French composer (1924–2008)

Serge Nigg (6 June 1924 – 12 November 2008) was a French composer, born in Paris.

== Biography ==
After initial studies with Ginette Martenot, Nigg entered the Paris Conservatory in 1941 and studied harmony with Olivier Messiaen and counterpoint with Simone Plé-Caussade. In 1945, he met René Leibowitz, who introduced him to the twelve-tone technique of composition. Together with other Leibowitz pupils, Antoine Duhamel, André Casanova and Jean Prodromidès, he gave the first performance of Leibowitz's Explications des Metaphors, Op. 15, in Paris in 1948. After completing a Concerto for Piano and Wind Instruments and a Concerto for Piano and String Orchestra (both 1943), and the symphonic poem Timour (1944), he became the first French composer to write a dodecaphonic work when his Variations for Piano and 10 Instruments appeared in 1946. This piece was premiered at the International Festival of Dodecaphonic Music, organized by Leibowitz in 1947.

In 1956, Nigg was appointed a member of the Music Committee for French state broadcasting. From 1967 to 1982, he was a member of the music management for the French Ministry of Culture, after which he taught classes in instrumentation and orchestration at the Paris Conservatory, and became President of the Société Nationale de Musique. He was elected to the Académie des Beaux-Arts in 1989 and served as its president in 1995.

Nigg died November 12, 2008, aged 84.

== Works ==
- Concerto for Piano and Wind Instruments, 1943
- Concerto for Piano and String Orchestra, 1943
- Piano Sonata No. 1, 1943
- Timour, symphonic poem, 1944
- Variations for Piano and 10 Instruments, 1946
- Four Mélodies on poems by Paul Éluard, 1950
- Billiard, ballet, 1950
- Pour un poète captif, symphonic poem, 1951
- Concerto for Piano and Orchestra No. 1, 1954
- Concerto for Violin and Orchestra, 1960
- Concerto for Flute and String Orchestra, 1960
- Jérôme Bosch, symphony, 1960
- Histoire d'œuf, conte musical based on Blaise Cendrars, 1961
- Pour un Tombeau d'Anatole, 1961
- Visages d'Axël, 1965–67
- Fulgur, 1970
- Concerto No. 2 for Piano and Orchestra, 1971
- Fastes de l'imaginaire, 1974
- Mirrors for William Blake, 1979
- Million d'oiseaux d'or, 1981
- String Quartet
- Du clair au sombre, song cycle for soprano and chamber orchestra, based on poems by Paul Éluard
- Arioso for Cello und Piano, 1987
- Concerto No. 1 for Viola and Orchestra, 1987–1988
- Poème for orchestra, 1990
- Sonata for Piano and Violin, 1996
- Tumultes for piano, 1998
- Deux images de nuits for piano, 1999
- Concerto No. 2 for Viola and Orchestra, 2000

== Sources ==
- Massin, Brigitte (2001). "Nigg, Serge". Grove Music Online.
