= Jean Prodromidès =

French composer (1927–2016)

Jean Prodromidès (3 July 1927 – 17 March 2016) was a French composer. He was born in Neuilly-sur-Seine in 1927 in a musical family. His father, who was of Greek origin, had a pianola by which Jean became familiar with works of Beethoven and Wagner. He was a pupil of René Leibowitz, who introduced him to dodecaphonic and serial composition. Together with other Leibowitz pupils, Serge Nigg, Antoine Duhamel and André Casanova, he gave the first performance of Leibowitz's Explications des Metaphors, Op. 15, in Paris in 1948.

Prodromidès composed for films such as Maigret et l'Affaire Saint-Fiacre and Danton. Prodromidés was elected to the Académie des Beaux-Arts in 1990 to Henry Sauguet's seat; Prodromidès was also president of the Academy and the Institut de France in 2005.

== Selected filmography ==
- 1956: Les biens de ce monde
- 1959: Archimède le clochard
- 1960: The Baron of the Locks (a.k.a. Le Baron de l'écluse)
- 1960: Le Voyage en ballon (a.k.a. Stowaway in the Sky)
- 1960: Blood and Roses (a.k.a. Et mourir de plaisir)
- 1967: Pillaged (a.k.a. Mise à sac), dir. Alain Cavalier
- 1969 Salome, dir. Pierre Karolnik
- 1983: Danton, dir. Andrzej Wajda

== Discography ==
Prodromidès's complete score, Le Voyage en ballon, has been released on CD by Disques Cinémusique in 2009.
