= Carlos Jiménez Mabarak =

Mexican composer (1916–1994)

Carlos Jiménez Mabarak (January 31, 1916 in Tacuba, Mexico – June 21, 1994 in Mexico City) was one of the most prolific Mexican composers of the 20th century. His music belongs to the transition from the Mexican Nationalism to the Avant garde and uses all musical genres. He composed in a period of almost 60 years.

== Life ==
He studied in Guatemala, Chile and Belgium. His mother was a writer from Veracruz of Lebanese descent. Mabarak practically spent his childhood outside Mexico. His father died when he was 4. During his youth, he lived in many countries because his mother worked in the diplomatic service. The family moved to Guatemala] when Carlos was 6. They lived near Quetzaltenango and almost three years in the capital. He began his piano lessons in Quetzaltenango with Jesús Castillo. Later they lived for almost 5 years in Santiago de Chile where Carlos studied humanism and continued his music education.

In 1932 the family moved to Belgium. While the rest of the family went to Cuba, Carlos stayed in Brussels for almost five years where he studied radio telephone engineering. In 1933, Carlos entered the Institute of high studies in music in Ixelles, a part of Brussels. There he studied piano with Mme Jacobi and harmony with Nellie Jones. In 1936 he obtained a diploma after winning a piano competition. He did his most important studies of Harmony and Musical Analysis with Marguerite Wouters who was cathedratic of the Royal Conservatoire of Belgium. Returning to Mexico in 1937 he decided to work entirely on music. His teacher in orchestra was Silvestre Revueltas in the National Conservatory of Music of Mexico. In 1942 he was appointed teacher in harmony in the Conservatory and since 1957 he taught composition. In 1945, Carlos Chávez entrusted him a symphony and Mabarak wrote his Symphony in E flat. In 1956 he received a scholarship by the UNESCO. In this period he studied dodecaphonism in Paris with René Leibowitz. Mabarak also began to use magnetophonic techniques in his works. In 1968, his fanfare was elected theme for the 1968 Summer Olympics in Mexico.
