= Dionysos (opera) =

Opera fantasy by Wolfgang Rihm

- Opera by Wolfgang Rihm
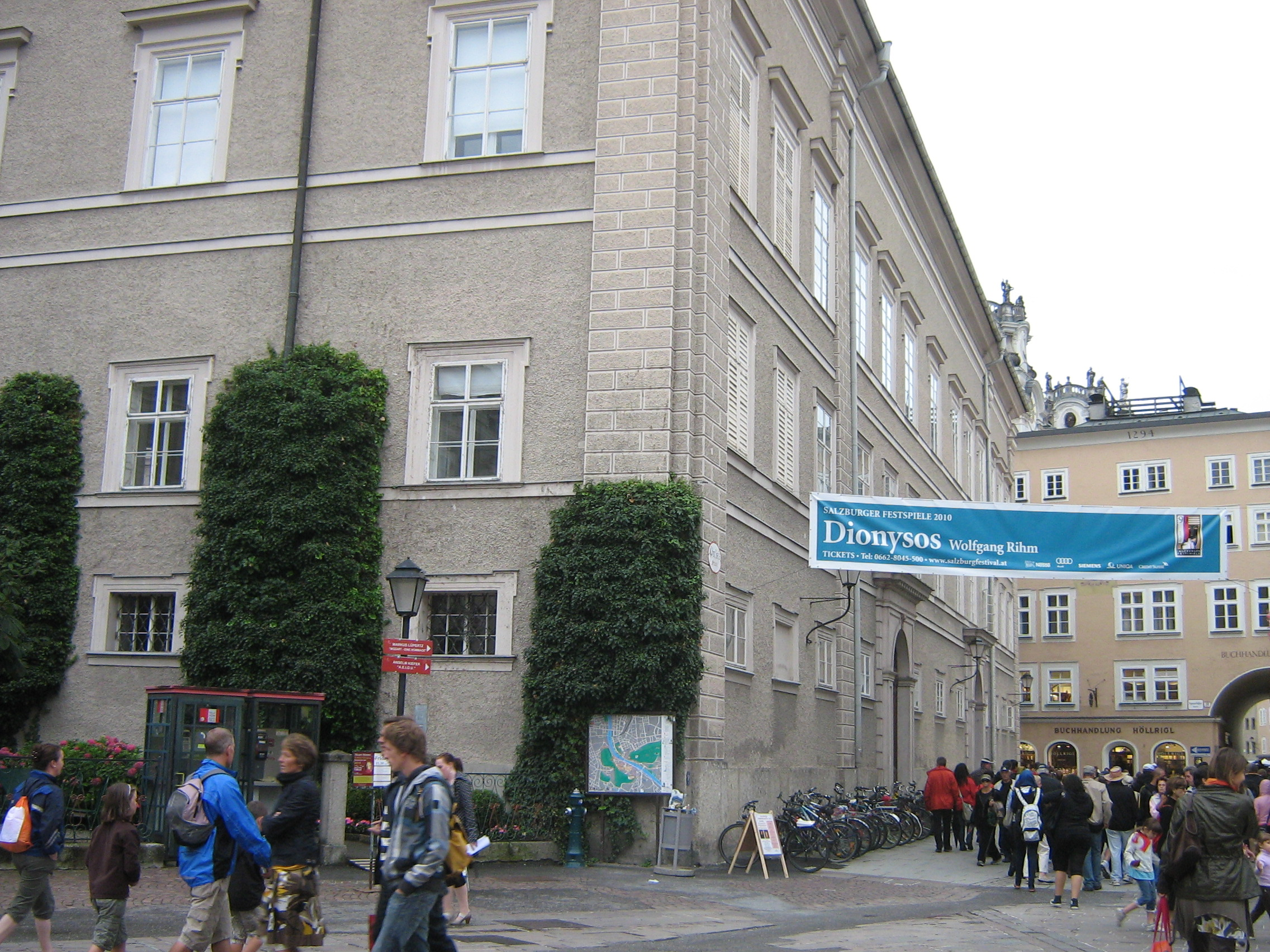
- Entrance to the premiere of the Salzburg Festival 2010
- Librettist: Rihm
- Language: German
- Based on: Dionysian Dithyrambs by Friedrich Nietzsche
- Premiere: 27 July 2010; Haus für Mozart, Salzburg

Dionysos is an opera by Wolfgang Rihm based on Friedrich Nietzsche's Dionysian Dithyrambs. The composer wrote the libretto and subtitled his work: "Opernphantasie nach Texten von Friedrich Nietzsche / Szenen und Dithyramben" ("Operatic fantasy after texts by Friedrich Nietzsche / Scenes and dithyrambs"). It premiered at the Salzburg Festival on 27 July 2010.

== History ==
Dionysos is Rihm's eleventh work for the stage. He considered an opera around Dionysos for 15 years and realized it when he received a commission from the Salzburg Festival, the Staatsoper Unter den Linden Berlin and De Nederlandse Opera. Rihm wrote the libretto, based on Nietzsche's late work, which he fragmented and arranged in a different order. He chose the passages according to his plans for the music. Rihm said in an interview that opera needed more Magic Flute, "mehr Machwerk" (More action), citing the opening scene with three ladies coming to the rescue of the prince attacked by a snake. Rihm said that opera finds its potential in situations that are not ordinary ("... findet ihre Möglichkeiten in Situationen, die nicht alltäglich sind"). The opera has autobiographical traits and is in a way his first comic opera.

Rihm dedicated the work "in friendship" to the conductor Ingo Metzmacher. Rihm composed mostly between December 2009 and May 2010, sending it in batches to the conductor. He finished the finale last minute.

The opera premiered at the Haus für Mozart in Salzburg on 27 July 2010. Johannes Martin Kränzle performed the title role (N.), with Mojca Erdmann, Elin Rombo and Matthias Klink in leading roles, the Deutsches Symphonie-Orchester Berlin and the Vienna State Opera Chorus, conducted by Metzmacher and staged by Pierre Audi. The magazine Opernwelt chose the performance as the premiere of the year (Uraufführung des Jahres), and Kränzle as singer of the year. A live recording was published as DVD.

The production was repeated from 8 June 2011 in Amsterdam and from 8 July 2012 in Berlin. A new production was staged on 8 February 2013 at the Theater Heidelberg by Ingo Kerkhof.

== Plot ==
The main character is called N., a symbol for both the poet Nietzsche, but also for Dionysos whose name Nietzsche used as his pen name for the dithyrambs. Some scenes relate to events in Nietzsche's life, others with the Dionysos myth. The action is not a linear story, but shows different views on life (Lebensbilder).

== Music ==
A review of the premiere in Opernwelt notes the overwhelming echos of late-romantic sensuality of sound (überbordender "Nachhall spätromantischer Klangsinnlichkeit"), reminiscent of Richard Strauss and Johannes Brahms.
