= Johannes Martin Kränzle =

German baritone in opera and concert (born 1962)

- Born: 1962 (age 62–63); Augsburg, Germany
- Education: Hochschule für Musik und Darstellende Kunst Frankfurt am Main
- Occupations: Classical baritone; Academic voice teacher
- Organizations: Oper Frankfurt; Hochschule für Musik und Tanz Köln
- Website: www.johannesmartinkraenzle.de

Johannes Martin Kränzle (born 1962) is a German baritone in opera and concert who has made an international career. For years a member of the Oper Frankfurt, he was chosen as Singer of the Year in 2011 after creating the leading role in Wolfgang Rihm's Dionysos at the Salzburg Festival. He made his debut at the Royal Opera House as Don Alfonso in Mozart's Così fan tutte, and at the Bayreuth Festival as Beckmesser in Wagner's Die Meistersinger von Nürnberg in 2017.

== Career ==
Born in Augsburg, Kränzle learned to play the violin and composed two operas while a student of the local humanistisches Gymnasium St. Stephan. He studied direction of music theatre in Hamburg. He studied voice at the Hochschule für Musik und Darstellende Kunst Frankfurt am Main with Martin Gründler. His first theatre engagement was from 1987 to 1991 at the Theater Dortmund, followed by the Staatsoper Hannover from 1991 to 1997. Kränzle was a member of the Oper Frankfurt from 1998 to 2016. He has appeared as a guest internationally.

As an academic teacher, he has been a guest professor in Natal from 1989. He was a guest professor at the Hochschule für Musik und Tanz Köln from 2013 to 2015. In 2011, he was chosen as Singer of the Year by Opernwelt.

In 2015, Kränzle was diagnosed with MDS and underwent a hematopoietic stem cell transplantation. He returned to the stage with a successful debut at the Royal Opera House in London as Don Alfonso in Mozart's Così fan tutte in September 2016. He made his debut at the Bayreuth Festival as Beckmesser in Wagner's Die Meistersinger von Nürnberg in 2017, conducted by Philippe Jordan and staged by Barrie Kosky, the first Jewish director at the Bayreuth Festival. Kränzle's interpretation was regarded as convincing in both his acting and the vocal characterization of his role.

== Opera ==
Kränzle appeared as a guest in 1990 as Sparbüchsen-Bill in Kurt Weill's Aufstieg und Fall der Stadt Mahagonny at the Hamburg State Opera, in 1992 as Guglielmo in Così fan tutte at the Heidelberger Schlossfestspiele, and in 1995 as Sekretary in Henze's Der junge Lord at the Bavarian State Opera. He appeared in the same years as Jan Janicki in Millöcker's Der Bettelstudent at the Seefestspiele Mörbisch. In Hanover, he performed in 1997 the title role of Britten's Billy Budd in a staging by David Mouchtar-Samorai that won a nomination for the Bayerischer Theaterpreis.

Kränzle has often collaborated with the opera director Nicolas Brieger: Lescault in Henze's Boulevard Solitude in Frankfurt, Andrej Bolkonski in Prokofiev's Krieg und Frieden in Cologne, and Frère Léon in Messiaen's Saint François d'Assise at the San Francisco Opera. He appeared as Margarete's brother in Busoni's Doktor Faust, staged by Jossi Wieler for the Staatsoper Stuttgart and San Francisco, and chosen as Inszenierung des Jahres 2005 (Staging of the Year).

He appeared at the Cologne Opera as Beckmesser in Wagner's Die Meistersinger von Nürnberg, staged by Uwe Eric Laufenberg; in the title role of Bartók's Bluebeard's Castle, staged by Bernd Mottl; and as the Forester in Janáček's Das schlaue Füchslein.

Kränzle's roles in Frankfurt included many by Mozart: Don Giovanni, Papageno, Conte Almaviva, and again Guglielmo und Don Alfonso. He performed there also the roles of Wolfram in Wagner's Tannhäuser, Gunther in his Götterdämmerung, Count Tomsky in Tchaikovsky's Pique Dame, the dark fiddler in Romeo und Julia auf dem Dorfe by Frederick Delius, and Prus in Janáček's Die Sache Makropulos staged by Richard Jones, among many others. He worked with director Christof Loy, performing Don Alfonso in Cosi fan tutte, which was chosen as Staging of the Year 2008, and won the Der Faust award in 2010. Kränzle made his debut at the Salzburg Festival in 2009 as Valens in Handel's Theodora. In 2010 he appeared as Danilo in Lehar's Die lustige Witwe at the Grand Théâtre de Genève.

He made his debut at both La Scala and the Berlin State Opera as Alberich in Wagner's Der Ring des Nibelungen, conducted by Daniel Barenboim. He performed the leading role of N. (Nietzsche) in the premiere of Wolfgang Rihm's Dionysos at the Salzburg Festival 2010, conducted by Ingo Metzmacher. 2011 he appeared first at the Glyndebourne Festival as Beckmesser in Die Meistersinger von Nürnberg. Again with Barenboim in Milan and Berlin, he appeared as Griasnoj in Rimsky-Korsakov's Die Zarenbraut, staged by Dimitri Tscherniakov.
