= Antoine Duhamel =

French composer (1925–2014)

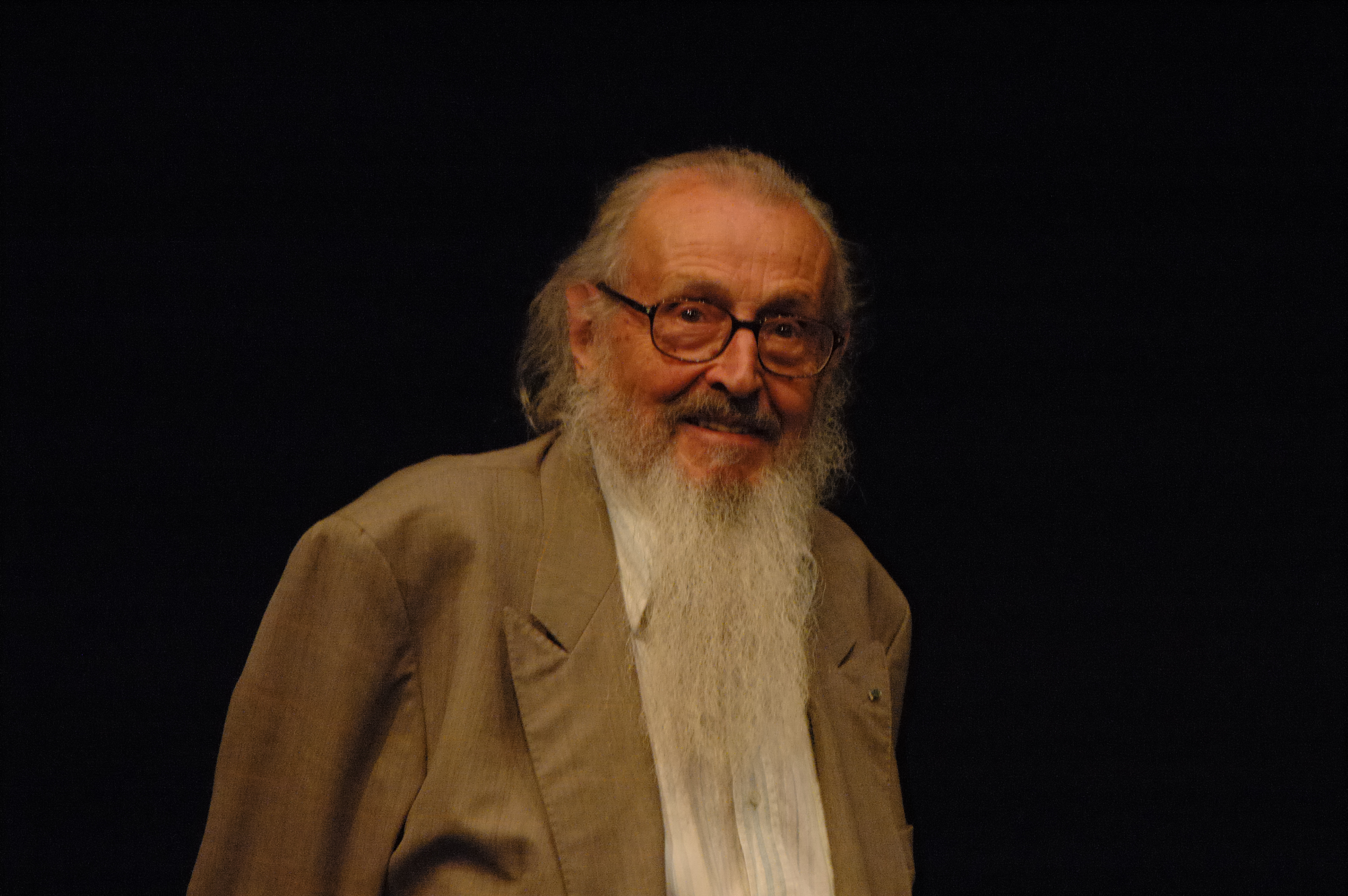
Antoine Duhamel in 2008.

Antoine Duhamel (30 July 1925 – 11 September 2014) was a French composer, orchestra conductor and music teacher.

== Life and career ==
Born in Valmondois in the Val-d'Oise département of France, Antoine Duhamel was one of the three sons of the French writer Georges Duhamel and actress Blanche Albane. He studied music at the Sorbonne. He was a pupil of René Leibowitz, an exponent of Arnold Schoenberg’s dodecaphonic and serial method of composing. Together with other Leibowitz pupils, Serge Nigg, André Casanova and Jean Prodromidès, he gave the first performance of Leibowitz's Explications des Metaphors, Op. 15, in Paris in 1948. He wrote the score for his first film in 1960, going on to work with many of Europe's film directors. In 2002 he was awarded the Silver Bear at the Berlin Film Festival for his music for the Bertrand Tavernier directed film, Laissez-passer.

Duhamel scored several of Jean-Luc Godard's films, including Pierrot le Fou and Week End. He died at the age of 89 in September 2014.

== Partial filmography ==
- 1963 : Méditerranée
- 1964 : The Pit and the Pendulum
- 1965 : Pierrot le Fou
- 1966 : Trap for the Assassin
- 1966 : La Longue marche
- 1966: La Voleuse
- 1967 : The Sailor from Gibraltar
- 1967 : Weekend
- 1968 : Stolen Kisses
- 1969 : Mississippi Mermaid
- 1970 : Bed and Board
- 1970 : The Cop
- 1971 : M comme Mathieu
- 1973 : Frank en Eva
- 1974 : Dakota
- 1978 : The Song of Roland
- 1979 : Mais ou et donc Ornicar
- 1979 : Return to the Beloved
- 1980 : Death Watch
- 1989 : El sueño del mono loco
- 1990 : Daddy Nostalgie
- 1994 : La Piste du télégraphe
- 1996 : Ridicule
- 1998 : The Girl of Your Dreams
- 2002 : Safe Conduct

== See also ==
- Gravel Pit
