= L'ivrogne corrigé =

Opera by Christoph Willibald Gluck

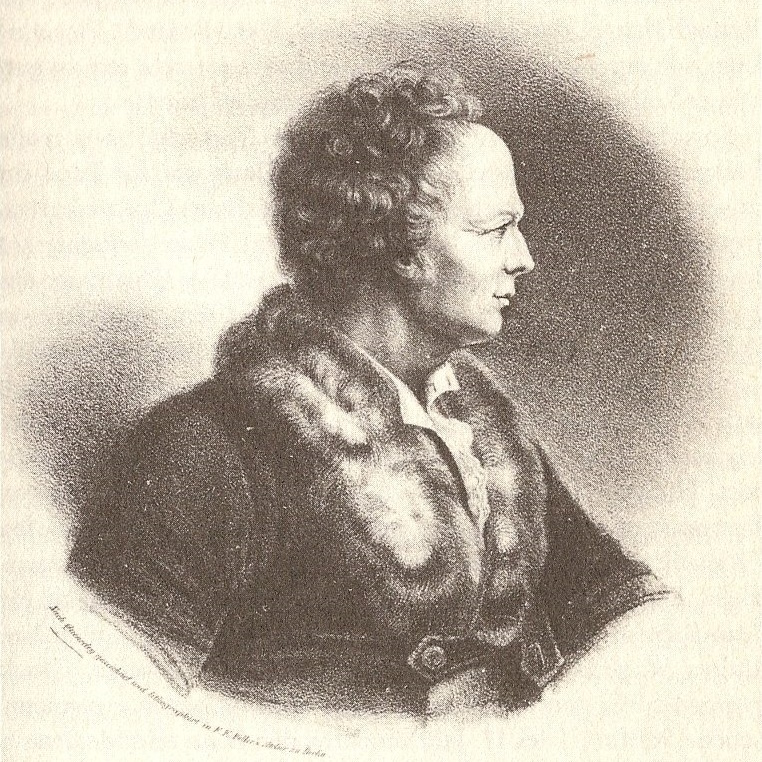
Portrait of Christoph Willibald Gluck, ca. 1750

L'ivrogne corrigé (The Drunkard Reformed) is an opera by the composer Christoph Willibald Gluck. It takes the form of an opéra comique in two acts. The French-language libretto is by Louis Anseaume and Lourdet de Sarterre. The opera premiered in April 1760 at the Burgtheater in Vienna.

The work was recorded in Paris in 1950 with Jean-Christophe Benoît (Mathurin), Bernard Demigny (Lucas), Claudine Collart (Colette), Freda Betti (Mathurine) and Jean Hoffmann (Cléon / Pluton), conducted by René Leibowitz.

== Roles ==
Cast	Voice type	Premiere cast
Mathurin, a friend of Lucas	taille (baritenor)	
Mathurine, Mathurin's wife	dessus (soprano)	
Colette, Mathurin's niece	dessus (soprano)	
Cléon, Colette's lover	basse-taille (bass-baritone)	
Lucas, a vine grower	basse-taille (bass-baritone)	
Chorus: Troupes of peasants and actors, friends of Lucas, disguised as goblins and furies

== Sources ==
- Holden, Amanda The Viking Opera Guide (Viking, 1993), page 374. ISBN 978-0-670-81292-9.
- Gluck Gesamtausgabe L'ivrogne corrigé
