= Dionysian Dithyrambs =

1888 collection of nine poems by Friedrich Nietzsche

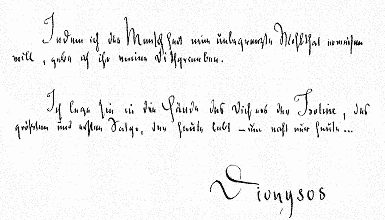
- Dedication of Dionysos-Dithyramben (Note: "As I want'd to bestow mankind a boundless benefaction, I give them my dithyrambs. I place them in the hands of the poët of Isoline, the first and greatest satyr that lives today – and not only today...")
- Author: Friedrich Nietzsche
- Original title: Dionysos-Dithyramben
- Language: German
- Genre: Poetry
- Publication date: 1891

Dionysian Dithyrambs (German: Dionysos-Dithyramben), also called Dionysus-Dithyrambs, is a collection of nine poems written in the second half of 1888 by Friedrich Nietzsche under the pen name of Dionysos.

The first six poems (Zwischen Raubvögeln, Das Feuerzeichen, Die Sonne sinkt, Letzter Wille, Ruhm und Ewigkeit and Von der Armut des Reichsten) were published in the 1891 edition of Also sprach Zarathustra. The other three poems (Klage der Ariadne, Nur Narr! Nur Dichter! and Unter Töchtern der Wüste) are compositions drawn from those found in Also sprach Zarathustra only slightly altered. Ruhm und Ewigkeit was published at the end of the 1908 first edition of Ecce Homo; however, it is now deemed to be a requisite part of Dionysos-Dithyramben.

== Musical settings ==
André Casanova included text from Dionysos-Dithyramben in his Third Symphony, in 1964. Wolfgang Rihm composed an opera, Dionysos, and compiled his own libretto from the Dionysian Dithyrambs. It premiered at the Salzburg Festival on 27 July 2010.

== Editions ==
- Friedrich Nietzsche: Sämtliche Werke. Kritische Studienausgabe in 15 Bänden. KSA. Vol. 6: Der Fall Wagner. Götzen-Dämmerung. Der Antichrist. Ecce homo. Dionysos-Dithyramben. Nietzsche contra Wagner. Ed. by Giorgio Colli and Mazzino Montinari. 10th edition. Deutscher Taschenbuch-Verlag, München u. a. 2011, ISBN 978-3-423-30156-5, pp. 377–410.
