= Ivan March =

English musician (1928–2018)

- Born: 5 April 1928; Portsmouth, England
- Died: 1 November 2018 (aged 90)
- Occupation(s): Musician, editor
- Spouse: Kathleen Forsyth
- Partner: Barbara Menard

Ivan March (5 April 1928 – 1 November 2018) was a musician, editor of The Stereo Record Guide and a series of Penguin Guides to recorded classical music.

== Life and career ==
Ivan March was born on 5 April 1928 in Portsmouth, but was raised in Eltham, South London. His father, John, was a policeman; his mother Mabel (née Adams) had been a milliner before her marriage. He was educated at Colfe's School, where one of his teachers awakened a love for music, particularly – then and always – that of Tchaikovsky. At the time, gramophone records were expensive and March conceived the idea that later became his Long Playing Record Library, enabling people to borrow rather than buy records.

While doing his national service in the late 1940s March joined the Central Band of the RAF as a horn player, and enrolled at the Royal Northern College of Music, after which he was a member of the orchestras of the D'Oyly Carte and Carl Rosa Opera Companies, before joining the BBC Scottish Symphony Orchestra.

In the 1950s he moved to Blackpool on the Lancashire coast, where he set up his mail-order record library, also becoming known for his talks to record clubs and gramophone societies. He was an early devotee of stereophonic recording, and wrote enthusiastically about it in Gramophone and other publications. His Gramophone colleague Martin Cullingford recalled:

Over the following decades Ivan contributed an extraordinary amount of reviews for Gramophone's pages, spanning a considerable breadth of repertoire. Throughout them all, however, a constant thread remained – namely, his astute reflection on a release's sound quality. In this, as in so much else in his life, Ivan was a much-liked figure dedicated to exploring, celebrating and sharing with as many people as possible the glorious art of recording.

During the 1960s many local authorities in Britain set up lending libraries of LPs, and March was called in to advise many of them. His wide knowledge of the range and varying quality of the available recorded repertoire led him to found The Stereo Record Guide, co-written with Edward Greenfield and Denis Stevens. (Note: Stevens dropped out after 1968; Robert Layton, and, later, Paul Czajkowski joined the reviewing panel.) He later came to an agreement with Penguin Books, and from 1975 to 2012 March and his colleagues wrote 29 volumes of Penguin guides to recorded classical music.

== Personal life ==
In 1953 March married Kathleen Forsyth, an opera singer ten years his senior. They had a son and a daughter. They separated in the 1980s, but he continued to care for her until her death in 2016. From the 1980s his partner was Barbara Menard, an American linguist, who survived him.

March died aged 90 on 1 November 2018. Cullingford recalled him:

Readers – both of Gramophone and indeed of the long-running Penguin Guides – will remember Ivan as a generous-spirited and expertly-informed critic whose advocacy of releases was born of a life-long passion for music and recording. In this, as in so much else in his life, Ivan was a much-liked figure dedicated to exploring, celebrating and sharing with as many people as possible the glorious art of recording.
