= The Stereo Record Guide =

Classical discography series

The Stereo Record Guide is a series of nine classical discographies published by the Long Playing Record Library in Blackpool from 1960 to 1974.

When volume 1 was published in late 1960, the majority of classical records issued were monaural. The authors were supportive of the new stereophonic recordings. Their first sentence stated “Let us begin by stating, unequivocally that good stereo on quite modest equipment is infinitely superior, domestically, to any other form of sound reproduction”.

The arrangement of the discographies is alphabetical by composer, except that volume 9 covers anthologies (orchestral music, instrumental music, vocal music, and humour on records) and is organised by artist.

| Volume | Year |
|---|---|
| 1 | 1960 |
| 2 | 1962 |
| 3 | 1963 |
| 4 | 1966 |
| 5 A-Mc | 1968 |
| 6 Me-Z | 1968 |
| 7 A-Ma | 1972 |
| 8 Me-Z | 1972 |
| 9 Treasury | 1974 |

Recordings receive brief critical reviews which consider the music, performance standards, and recorded sound. Manufacturers catalogue numbers are included. Records are rated with a star system from *** to *.

Four reviewers compiled these books: Edward Greenfield, Ivan March, Denis Stevens, and Robert Layton. Layton joined the reviewers with volume 5-6 (1968), and Stevens left the project after those volumes were published (he died in 2004).

Two volumes titled A Guide to Bargain Classics (1962-1964) were also compiled by these authors and published by the Long Playing Record Library.

Penguin Books published three volumes of guides to bargain records (1966, 1970 and 1972).

Penguin Books took over publication of these discographies in 1975, starting with the Penguin Stereo Record Guide. Four decades after the first publication; Greenfield, March, and Layton continued to review thousands of recordings.
