= Robert Layton (musicologist) =

English musicologist and music critic (1930–2020)

Robert Edward Layton (2 May 1930 – 9 November 2020) was an English musicologist and music critic.

== Biography ==
Between 1949 and 1953 Layton studied at Worcester College, Oxford under Edmund Rubbra and Egon Wellesz. He then went to Sweden, where he learned the language and studied with Carl-Allan Moberg at the universities of Uppsala and Stockholm (1953–1955). He was a teacher before joining the BBC in 1959. He worked first on music presentation and from 1961 on music talks. He was the BBC's senior music talks producer (1970) and senior music producer (1982–90).

Layton specialised in Scandinavian music. He wrote extensively on Franz Berwald – his book Franz Berwald was first published in Swedish in 1956, and in English three years later – and published books on Edvard Grieg and Jean Sibelius. He made many broadcasts, contributed regularly to Gramophone and was a co-author of The Stereo Record Guide and the Penguin Guides to recorded classical music. He was general editor of the BBC Music Guide series (1974–1990).

The entry for Layton in The Oxford Dictionary of Music refers to him as "Sole authority on Danish composer Esrum-Hellerup" – a reference to a 1980 prank where, among his scholarly articles on Scandinavian music in Grove's Dictionary of Music and Musicians, Layton smuggled in one on a fictitious composer, Dag Henrik Esrum-Hellerup. Despite the long tradition of including fictitious entries in dictionaries and encyclopedias, the editor of Grove, Stanley Sadie, was not amused and the article was removed in the second edition.

Layton died on 9 November 2020, at the age of 90.

== Writings ==
Layton's books include:

- Franz Berwald (1959)
- Sibelius 1965 (second edition, 1978; third edition 1992)
- Britain, Scandinavia and the Netherlands: 20th Century Composers Vol. III (with Humphrey Searle, 1972)
- Dvořák Symphonies and Concertos 1978
- A Companion to the Concerto 1988
- A Guide to the Symphony 1995
- Grieg 1998

== References and sources ==
=== Sources ===
- Slonimsky, Nicholas; Kuhn, Laura; McIntire, Dennis (2001). "Layton, Robert". In Laura Kuhn (ed.). Baker's Biographical Dictionary of Musicians (8th ed.). New York: Schirmer. ISBN 978-0-02-866091-2.
