= Denis Stevens =

Denis William Stevens CBE (2 March 1922 – 1 April 2004) was a British musicologist specialising in early music, conductor, professor of music and radio producer.

== Early years ==
He was born in High Wycombe, Buckinghamshire and attended the Royal Grammar School there. From that school, he won a scholarship to read modern languages at Jesus College, Oxford in 1940. During World War II, he served as a cryptanalyst in India and Burma. After the war, he returned to Oxford to complete his degree. From 1949 to 1954, he was a producer at the BBC Third Programme. In 1951, together with John McCarthy, Stevens founded the Ambrosian Singers.

== Career ==
Among his many other works, Stevens completed the task of producing the Supplementary Volume to the 5th edition of Grove's Dictionary of Music and Musicians, which Eric Blom had not been able to complete by the time of Blom's death in 1959. The Supplementary Volume was published in 1961. He also contributed to The Stereo Record Guide through 1968.

From 1964 to 1976, he was professor of musicology at Columbia University, New York and during this period often wrote collaboratively with others such as music critic Alec Robertson. In 1995, he was appointed as visiting professor at Goldsmiths College, London, the institution which now houses his extensive Monteverdi library.

Best known for his work on early baroque Italian composers, especially Claudio Monteverdi, and for his pioneering concerts and recordings with the Accademia Monteverdiana (which he founded), Stevens was appointed a Commander of the Order of the British Empire (CBE) in 1984.

== Bibliography ==
- Stevens, Denis. (1949). In nomine - Altenglische Kammermusik, für vier und fünf Stimmen. Bärenreiter.
- Stevens, Denis. (1951). The Mulliner Book - Eleven pieces for keyboard instruments. Stainer & Bell.
- Stevens, Denis. (1952). The Mulliner Book - A Commentary. Stainer & Bell.
- Stevens, Denis. (1957). Thomas Tomkins, 1572–1656. Macmillan.
- Stevens, Denis. (1961). Tudor Church Music, 1572–1656. Faber & Faber.
- Tallis, Thomas; Stevens, Denis. (1961). Five hymns - A Cappella, Volume 1. Associated Music Publishers.
- Tallis, Thomas; Stevens, Denis. (1961). Five hymns - Deus Tuorum Millitum (SAATB). Associated Music Publishers.
- Tallis, Thomas; Stevens, Denis. (1961). Five hymns - Jam Christus astra ascenderat (SATTB). Associated Music Publishers.
- Grove, George; Blom, Eric; Stevens, Denis. (1961). Dictionary of Music and musicians: Supplementary Volume. St Martin's Press.
- Robertson, Alec; Stevens, Denis. (1962). A History of Music. Cassell.
- Stevens, Denis. (1965). Altenglische Orgelmusik - Manualiter. Bärenreiter.
- Caldwell, John; Stevens, Denis. (1966). Early Tudor Organ Music, Volume 6. Stainer and Bell.
- Stevens, Denis. (1967). English Madrigals - For Four Voices. Penguin Books.
- Robertson, Alec; Stevens, Denis. (1969). Pelican History of Music, Harmondsworth, Volumes 1–3. Penguin Books.
- Stevens, Denis. (1970). English Madrigals - For Five Voices. Penguin Books.
- Stevens, Denis (ed.); et al. (1970). Music in Honour of St. Thomas of Canterbury (1118–1170), for Soloists, Choir, Organ Or Other Instruments. Kent: Novello.
- Yonge, Nicolas; Stevens, Denis. (1972). Musica Transalpina. Gregg International.
- Robertson, Alec; Stevens, Denis. (1973). The Pelican History of Music - Renaissance and Baroque. Penguin Books.
- Robertson, Alec; Stevens, Denis. (1977). Historia General de la Música. 1 - Antiguas Formas de Polifonía.
- Conforti, Giovanni Luca; Stevens, Denis. (1981). Musicology: A Practical Guide. Pro/Am Music Resources.
- Monteverdi, Claudio; Stevens, Denis. (1983). L' Orfeo: Favola in Música - Venice 1615. Gregg International.
- Marcello, Benedetto; Stevens, Denis; et el. (1985). Salmo decimoquinto: from Estro poetico-armonico, Vol. III - for alto voice, cello and basso continuo, Issue 15. Grancino Editions.
- Stevens, Denis. (1989). The Joy of Ornamentation - Rome 1593. Schirmer Books.
- Robertson, Alec; Stevens, Denis. (1990). Geschichte der Musik, Volume 1. Pawlak.
- Robertson, Alec; Stevens, Denis. (1993). Historia General de la Música - Volume 2. Istmo.
- Stevens, Denis. (1997). Early Music. Kahn & Averill.
- Stevens, Denis. (2001). Monteverdi in Venice. Fairleigh Dickinson University Press.
- Arnold, Franck Thomas; Stevens, Denis. (2003). The Art of Accompaniment from a Thorough-bass: As Practised in the XVIIth & XVIIIth Centuries, Volume 1. Courier Corporation.
