= Edward Greenfield =

English music critic and broadcaster

Edward Harry Greenfield OBE (3 July 1928 – 1 July 2015) was an English music critic and broadcaster.

== Early life ==
Edward Greenfield was born in Westcliff-on-Sea, Essex. His father, Percy Greenfield, was a manager in a labour exchange, while his mother, Mabel, was a clerk. He was briefly evacuated to Belper in Derbyshire when the Second World War began. He attended Westcliff High School for Boys, and then did two years of National Service. During his service, which began in 1947, he was with the Royal Army Educational Corps, where he was promoted to sergeant. He was deployed with the British Army of the Rhine in Germany.

He went to Trinity Hall, Cambridge, to study modern languages, but ended up graduating in law.

== Career ==
Greenfield joined The Manchester Guardian in 1953, where he began as a filing clerk. He then became a lobby correspondent in the House of Commons.

He was a record critic for the newspaper from 1955, a music critic from 1964, and was chief music critic from 1977 until his retirement in 1993. He contributed to Gramophone magazine from 1960, and was joint editor of The Stereo Record Guide after 1960.

A regular broadcaster on the BBC, he presented classical music programmes on the World Service, including his selection of music and requests on The Greenfield Collection, and was a regular contributor to the Building a Library feature of Radio 3's Record Review for many years.

Greenfield was appointed OBE in 1994. In 2002 he was elected as the Master of the Art Workers' Guild.

== Later life and death ==
In 2010, Greenfield entered into a civil partnership with Paul Westcott, a press officer at Chandos Records.

In his later years, he suffered from an undiagnosed condition that affected his balance and rendered him immobile. He died at his home in Spitalfields, London, on 1 July 2015, two days before his 87th birthday. Paul Westcott died in December 2022.

== Books ==
- Puccini – Keeper Of The Seal. Arrow Books. 1958.
- Joan Sutherland. Ian Allan. 1972. ISBN 978-0711003187.
- André Previn. New York Drake. 1973. ISBN 978-0877495277.
- (with Ivan March, Paul Czajkowski, Robert Layton) Layton, Robert; Greenfield, Edward (2012). The Penguin Guide to the 1000 Finest Classical Recordings. Penguin. ISBN 978-0141399751.
- Portrait Gallery: A Life in Classical Music. Elliott and Thompson. 2014. ISBN 978-1909653580.
